= LGBTQ culture in Cardiff =

Culture shared by LGBTQ people in Cardiff, Wales

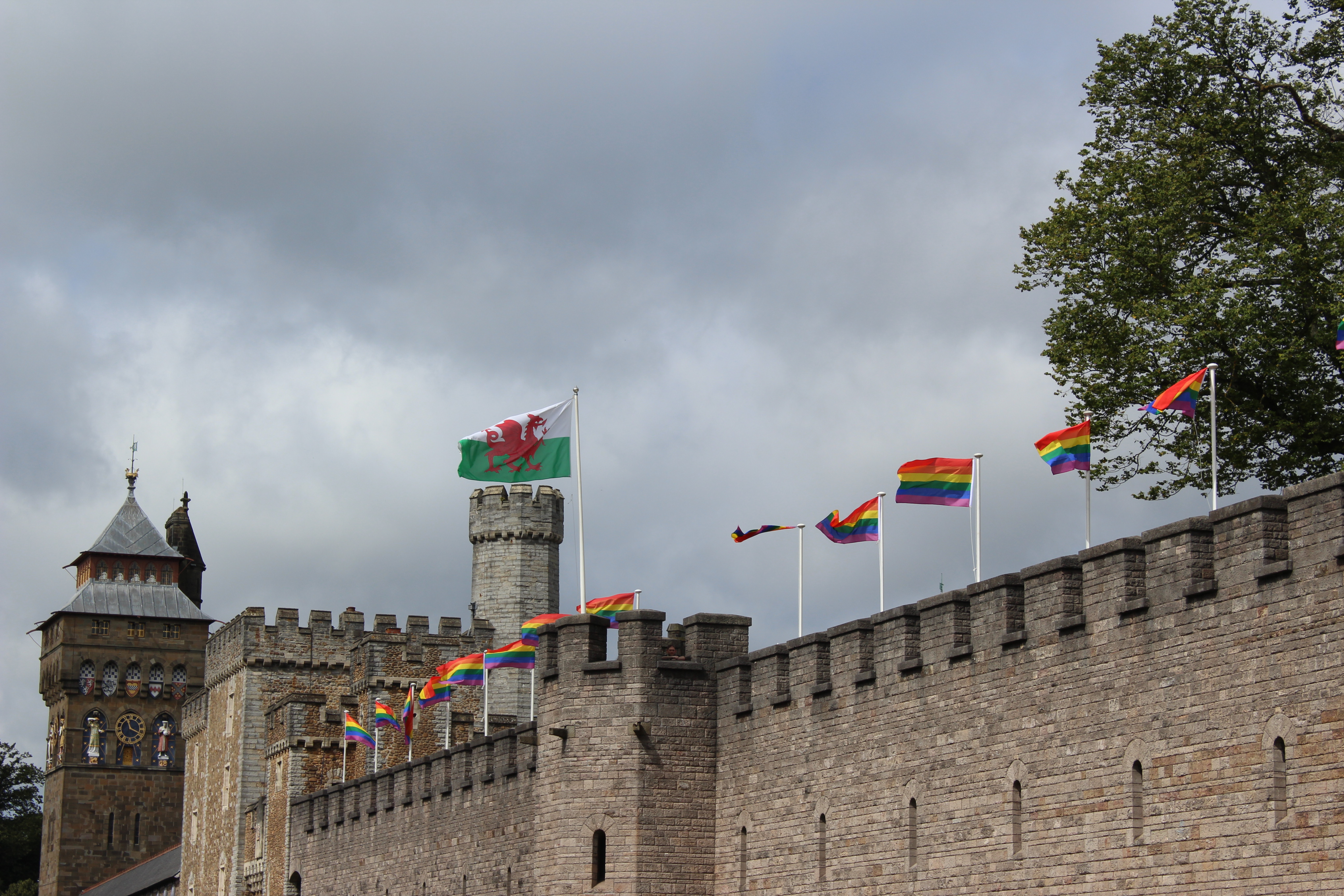
LGBTQ+ pride flags on Cardiff Castle for Pride Cymru 2016

The LGBT community in Cardiff is the largest in Wales. The 2021 census found that 5.33% of people aged 16 and over identified as lesbian, gay, bisexual, or other.

== History ==
=== Early history ===
Homosexuality was partially decriminalised in 1967, thanks in part to Cardiff born MP Leo Abse (whose MP seat at the time was in Pontypool).

Prior to the law change there is some evidence of LGBTQ+ culture in Cardiff around criminal records for cross dressing, gross indecency, and buggery, though criminalisations were higher than rural areas they were minor compared to other UK cities.

Cardiff's The Golden Cross opened in 1863. It has been recognised as a gay bar since at least the 1970s, when a wider commercial gay scene was first prominent in the city.

=== 1970s ===
A Cardiff-Newport branch of Campaign for Homosexual Equality (CHE) was formed in 1972, most of its 50+ members living in Cardiff, first meeting at the Blue Anchor pub on St Mary's Street (now Le Monde restaurant) but later moving to Chapter Arts Centre in Canton. More popular with men, a separatist women's group later formed. A Cardiff faction of the Gay Liberation Front also formed in this era also meeting at the Blue Anchor. Ken Follett wrote about the GLF in the South Wales Echo in 1971. The GLF later merged into the CHE group.

Cardiff FRIEND, one of many the city based outposts of London FRIEND, also ran from 1973. They took helpline phone calls from an office in St Mary's Street, and later moved to the Rights Information Bureau on Charles Street. The group changed their name to Friend South Wales, and registered as a charity in 1993.

The Rights Information Bureau also held offices for the Gay Liberation Front group and the Nationwide Transvestite Group (an early Trans organisation) from 1971.

=== 1980s ===
In the 1980s there were a number of LGBT+ venues in Cardiff including the Tunnel Club (now Metros), Dubrovnik Restaurant and SIRS. The city's oldest gay venue Kings Cross ceased to be an LGBT+ venue in 2013 when it became a gastropub called The Corner House.

The 1980s also saw Cardiff's first dedicated gay street theatre groups, LGBTQ+ community centres and youth clubs. As well as cruising areas being established, most popular being Bute Park, public toilets in Cathays Park and Cardiff Central Station.

Inspired by London's Gay Switchboard, Zoe Balfour started Cardiff Lesbian Line in October 1981, which ran until at least the 1990s.

The Wales Lesbian and Gay Co-op was founded in 1986 and began holding meetings at the Quakers meeting hall on Charles Street, Cardiff. The group were keen to establish a Lesbian and Gay Community Centre in South Wales and applied to South Glamorgan County Council for funding.

Cardiff born transgender pilot, Kristina Sheffield began working for Airways International Cymru in 1987. Sheffield later took part in a 1998 legal challenge against the UK government at the European Court of Human Rights. She argued that the government were breaching transgender people's privacy by refusing to allow them to change their legal gender on their birth certificates. The European Court disagreed and Sheffield lost the case.

1988 saw Cardiff hold a Wales Against Section 28 protest, and formation of Wales Against the Clause. Their protests were held alongside other city demonstrations across the UK.

By the end of the century parallel roads Charles Street and Churchill Way had become heart of LGBTQ+ Cardiff, including Minskys, a popular cabaret and drag bar which eventually closed 2020.

=== 21st century ===
The early 2000s saw the popular LGBTQ+ club night Hell's Bent in Cardiff, the short lived WOW bar on Churchill Way and gay representation on Russell T. Davies' era of writing Doctor Who and its spin-off Torchwood series, both set in Cardiff.

In 2007 the Iris Prize was formed in Cardiff which celebrates LGBTQ+ short films. It has an annual festival screening films open to the public.

Cardiff's history of protests has continued, with Trans Aid Cymru being formed in 2020 after a group of activists held a protest outside of Cardiff Castle to protest the Gender Recognition Act 2004 reforms being dropped. A second protest about the reforms was held outside the Senedd, after statistics were released showing that 70% of respondents supported the proposed changes to the gender recognition act.

In 2022 Shash Appan led a protest with Trans Aid Cymru outside Tŷ William Morgan to protest the delays in a UK Conversion therapy ban. The proposed ban was initially dropped, before the government instead announced that they would be pushing forward with it, but that it would not include protections around gender identity. Shortly after the Cardiff protest Hannah Blythyn announced that the Welsh Government would be seeking legal advice to determine if Wales could implement their own ban on conversion therapy.

A further protest was held at Tŷ William Morgan in 2023 after the UK government blocked the Gender Recognition Reform (Scotland) Bill from passing into law. Protesters from Trans Aid Cymru stuck homemade birth, death, and marriage certificates across the building, to represent how trans people regularly misgendered on these legal documents throughout their lives.

== Pride in Cardiff ==
The first iteration of Pride held in Cardiff was in 1985, which was a parade on Queen Street in the city centre organised by Cardiff University students (principally their GaySoc/Cardiff Lesbian and Gay Students group). Organiser Francis Brown remembers attendance being less than 30 but Norena Shopland's Forbidden Lives cites over 100 attendees.

The march returned in 1986 and 1987 with the route beginning at the Cardiff University Students' Union and working its way down Queens Street, finishing at the Kings Cross Pub.

=== Pride Cymru ===
The first Cardiff Mardi Gras was held in September 1999, and has happened annually since. In 2014, it changed its name to Pride Cymru. In 2017 they took over the running of Cardiff Big Weekend, merging the event with their annual pride celebrations.

=== Big Queer Picnic ===
The first Big Queer Picnic was held in August 2012 after the founders felt like Cardiff needed an alternative grassroots pride event. It is run as a free community based event celebrating sexual and gender diversity. It is usually held on the Saturday of Pride Cymru in Sophia Gardens, Cardiff.

=== Glitter Pride ===
The first BAME Pride held in Wales was hosted by Glitter Cymru in August 2019. Held as a community event to highlight the joy and diversity of the BAME LGBTQ+ community in Cardiff. Due to the COVID-19 pandemic a second event didn't take place until 2022, with the event rebranded as Glitter Pride. It has returned annually since then, and has been funded by the Grassroots Pride Fund.

=== Cardiff Trans Pride ===
In 2019 the first Cardiff Trans Pride was held across three days. Organised by Nerida Bradley and Miles Rozel, the events focused on platforming trans voices and performers.

Due to the COVID-19 pandemic the next Trans Pride wasn't held until 2023. It returned with three days of events spread over 15-17 September, and included a march through the city centre. A third event occurred in August 2025.

== Groups and venues ==
Cardiff has a vibrant gay scene, with all the main venues being within walking distance of each other. The Golden Cross, Mary's, Pulse, Eclipse, and The Queer Emporium (containing Paned o Gê bookshop) are the backbone of the community.

The Queer Emporium also hosts the annual Queer Fringe Festival in Cardiff, their first festival in 2022. The Iris Prize is also an annual LGBTQ+ short film and prize awarding festival. LezDiff (the Cardiff International Lesbian and Arts Festival) was founded by filmmaker Rachel Dax in 2022.

There are a few book groups such as Lez Read, a LGBTQIA+ Book Club at Cardiff Central Library and the Gay Men's Book Club.

Cardiff has multiple LGBTQ+ choirs including the South Wales Gay Men's Chorus, Cardiff Trans Singers and Songbirds. The city is also home to many LGBTQ+ inclusive sports clubs, notably the Cardiff Lions, a member of the International Gay Rugby league, and the Cardiff Dragons, which competes in the Gay Football Supporters Network's league.

There are also a number of social and mutual support groups in the city. Glitter Cymru are a Cardiff based but Wales wide community group for ethnic minority LGBTQ+ people. Trans Aid Cymru are a transgender, intersex, and nonbinary mutual aid group founded in Cardiff in 2020.

St Fagans, the Museum of Cardiff and Glamorgan Archives collect artefacts relating to Cardiff LGBTQ+ life.

Theatres across Cardiff have put on a number of productions that champion LGBTQ+ dramaturgs, performers, and stories. Notably, the Wales Millennium Centre opened its 140-seat Cabaret space in 2023, dedicated to drag, comedy, and burlesque. The venue was also known for its three-year run of critically acclaimed and sold-out adult pantomime productions in the festive seasons: XXXmas Carol (2021), The Lion, The B!tch and the Wardrobe (2022), and The First Xxxmas: A Very Naughty-tivity (2023). These productions, starring performers who are LGBTQ+ and of global majority heritage, have been praised for not only their camp humour and production quality but also "serious and heartfelt" moments and political messages embedded in the performance, such as the danger of tyrant politicians and the plights of refugees.

A selection of LGBTQ+ venues in Cardiff

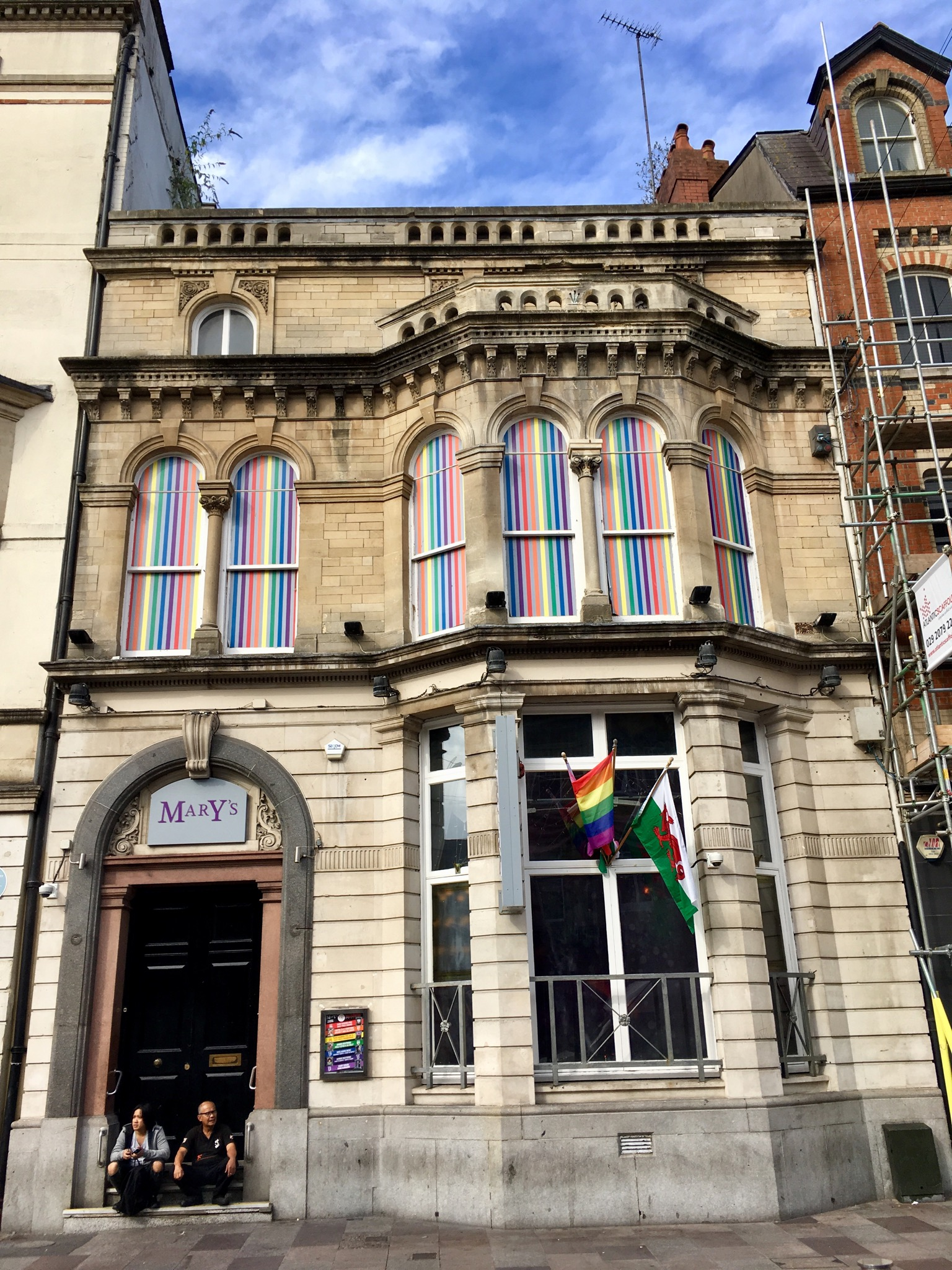
Mary's LGBTQ+ venue on St Mary's Street in Cardiff

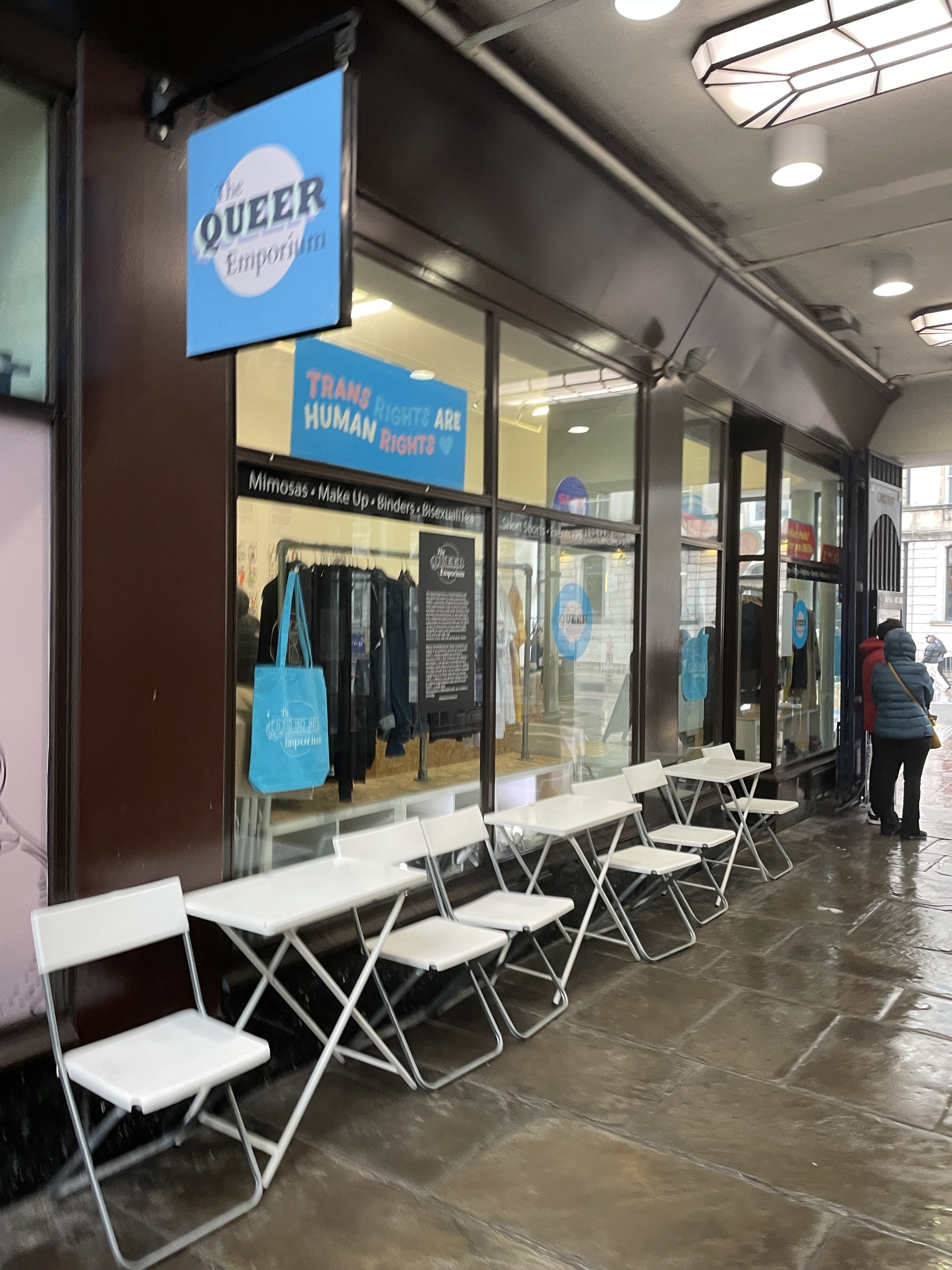
The Queer Emporium in the Royal Arcade

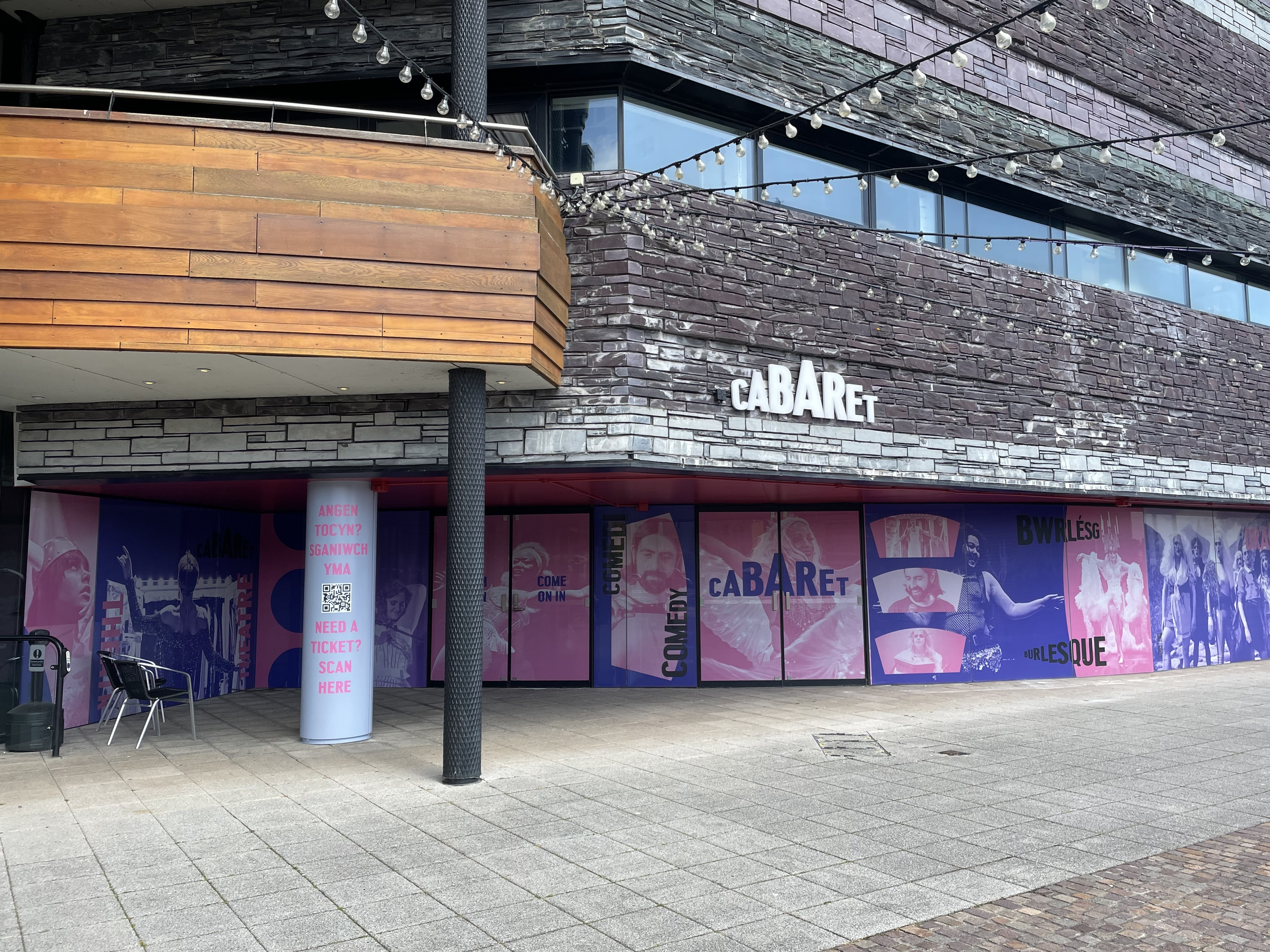
The front entrance of Cabaret - part of Wales Millennium Centre, opened in February 2023.

=== LGBTQ+ student societies in Cardiff ===
Cardiff is home to several universities and their students have established societies and campaign groups dedicated to the LGBTQ+ community and activism.

==== Societies at Cardiff University: ====
- CU Pride (LGBT+ Society) - Society focused on organising social activities for LGBTQ+ students on campus.
- Transgender, Ally, Non-binary, Gender questioning, and Gender non-conforming Society (TANGGS) - Sober society dedicated to students who identify with the transgender umbrella and allies.
- Healthcare Equality and Advocacy for LGBTQ+ (HEAL) Society ^{†}- Set up by medical students with the aims to advocate for LGBTQIA+ equality within healthcare and to provide LGBTQ+ inclusive teaching sessions relevant to healthcare professionals.
- LGBTQ+ Students Network: Campaign group led by two elected officers (with one seat reserved for a transgender student), which run awareness campaigns, lobby for policy changes. Notably, the network's officers for the 2023-24 academic year successfully campaigned for the creation for a Gender Identity Support fund, which transgender students could apply to cover costs such as gender affirming clothes and transports to essential appointments.

==== Society at Cardiff Metropolitan University: ====
- LGBTQIA+ Society

==== Society at Royal Welsh College of Music and Drama: ====
- Pride Society

Notes: ^{†} indicates that the society is not active as of 2026.

== Demographics ==
The 2021 Census showed that 5.33% of Cardiff's population identifies as LGBTQ+. 0.71% identified as having a different gender identity than the one registered at their birth. Both percentages are the highest throughout Wales.

== Notable residents ==
Those identifying as LGBTQ+ past and present:

- Shash Appan
- Stephen Doughty
- Felicity Evans
- Catrin Feelings (Drag performer)
- Jess Fishlock
- Colin Jackson
- Daf James
- Sarah Jones (minister)
- La-Chun Lindsay
- David Llewellyn
- Marmalade (Drag performer)
- Laura McAllister
- Scott McGlynn
- Ivor Novello (1893 - 1951)
- Lisa Power
- Colin Riordan
- Victoria Scone (Drag performer)
- Norena Shopland
- Noel Sullivan
- Gareth Thomas (rugby, born 1974)
- Nathan Wyburn
Notable former and current residents of Cardiff who identify as LGBTQ+

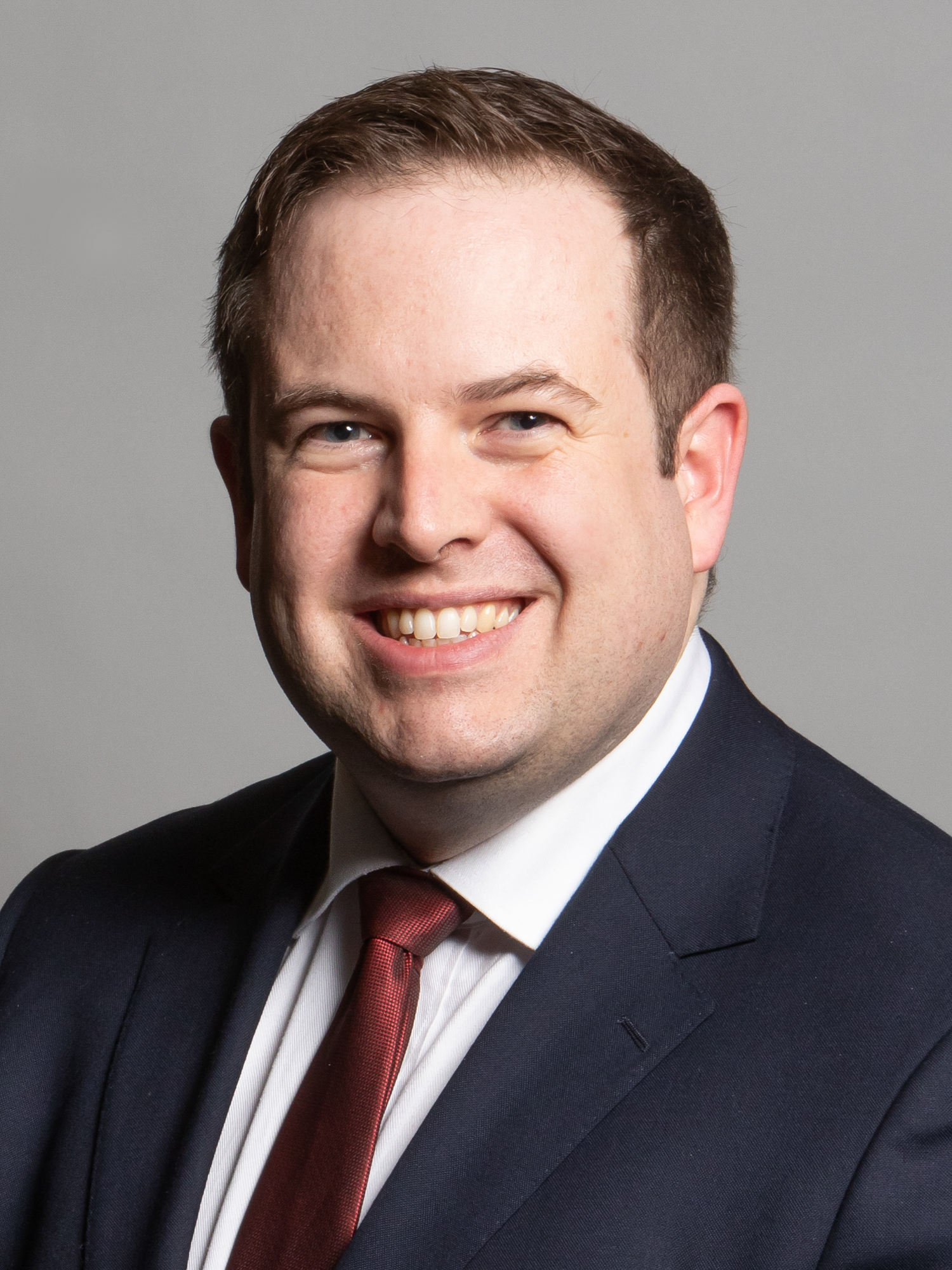
Stephen Doughty - MP for Cardiff South and Penarth since 2012

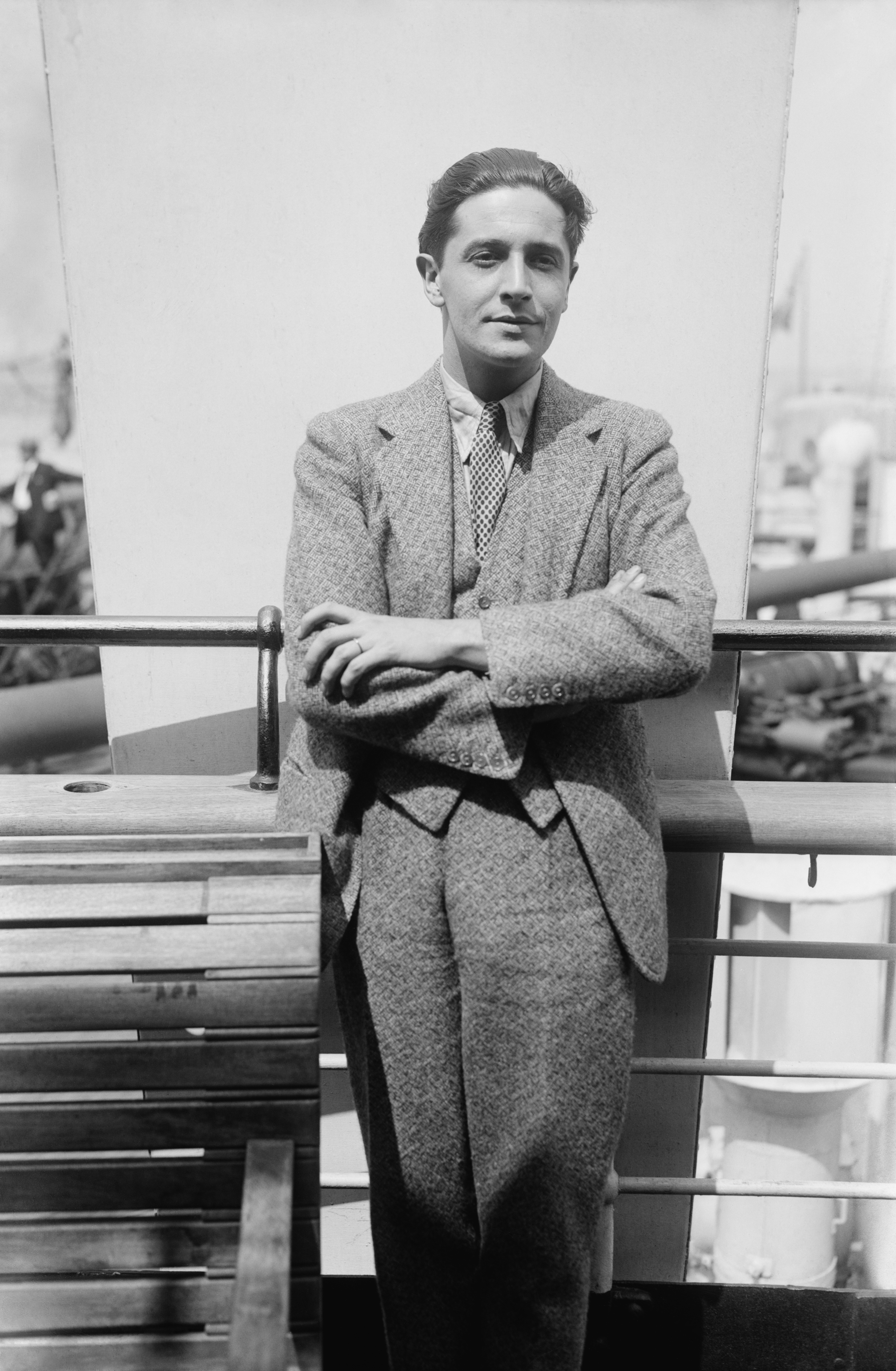
Ivor Novello (1893 - 1951) - Actor, singer, and composer; namesake of the Ivor Novello Awards.

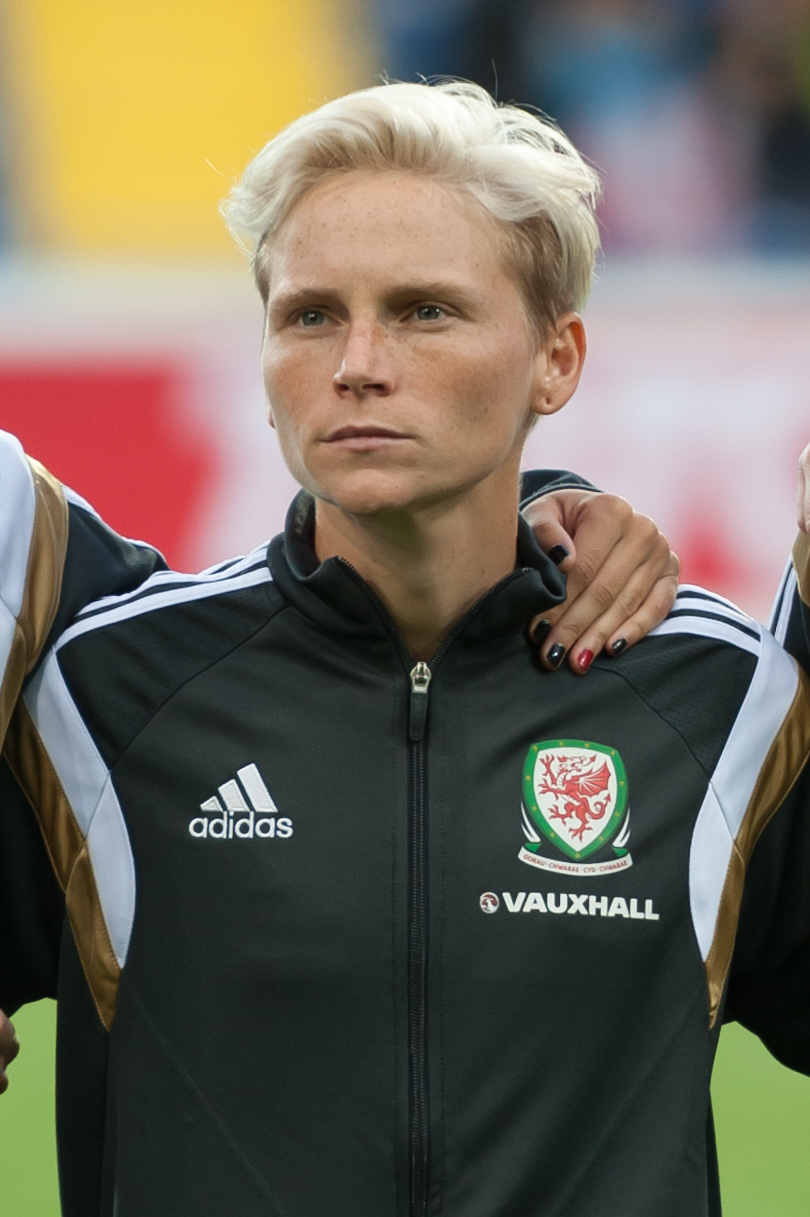
Jess Fishlock - International footballer for Wales national team and Wales's all-time record goal scorer.

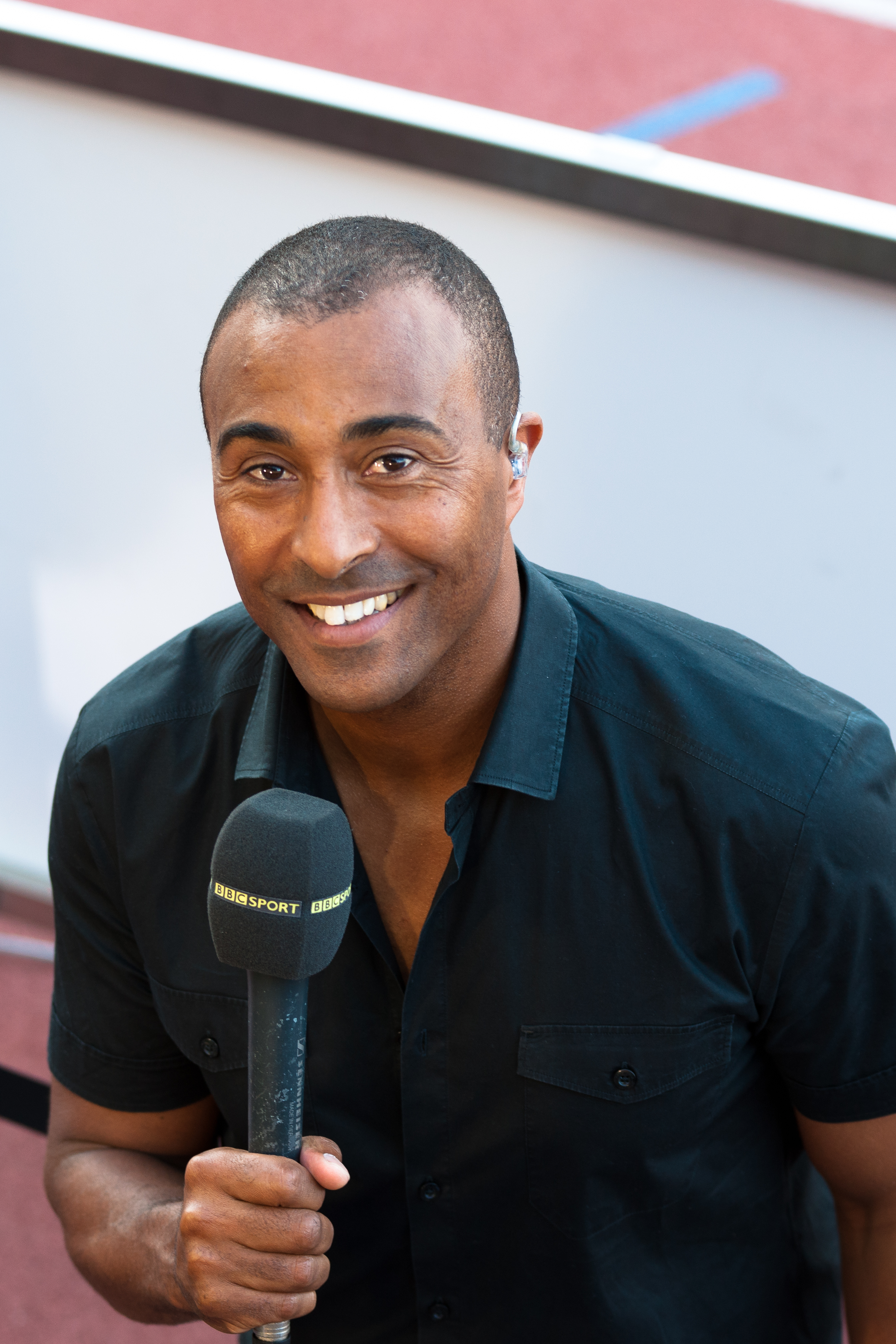
Colin Jackson - Retired sprinting and hurdling athlete with a Silver Olympic medal (1988) and two world championships, among other medals and accolades.

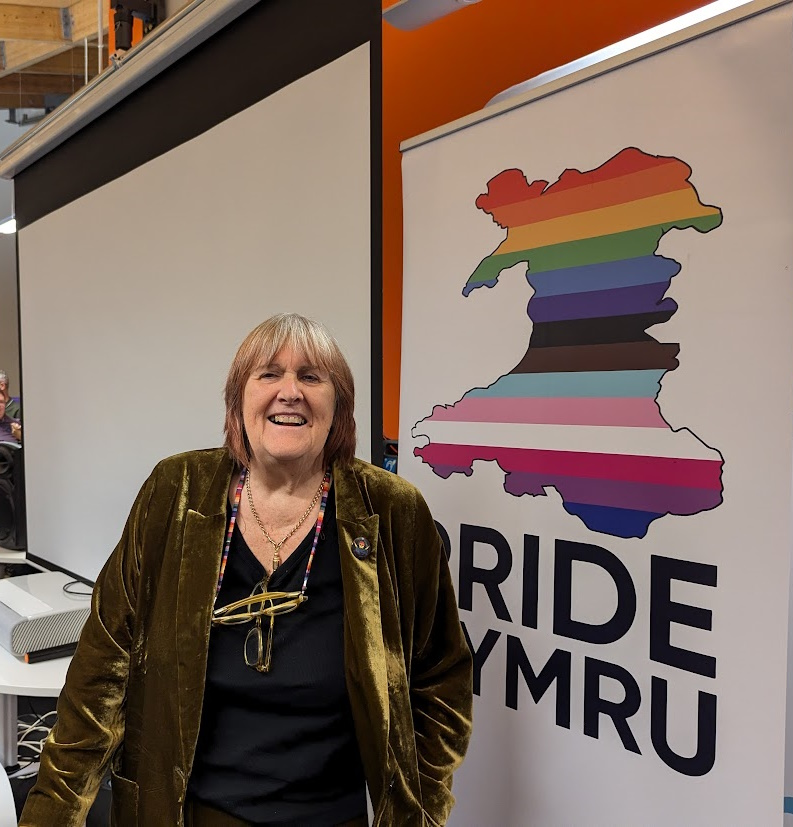
Lisa Power - LGBTQ+ rights and sexual health campaigner.

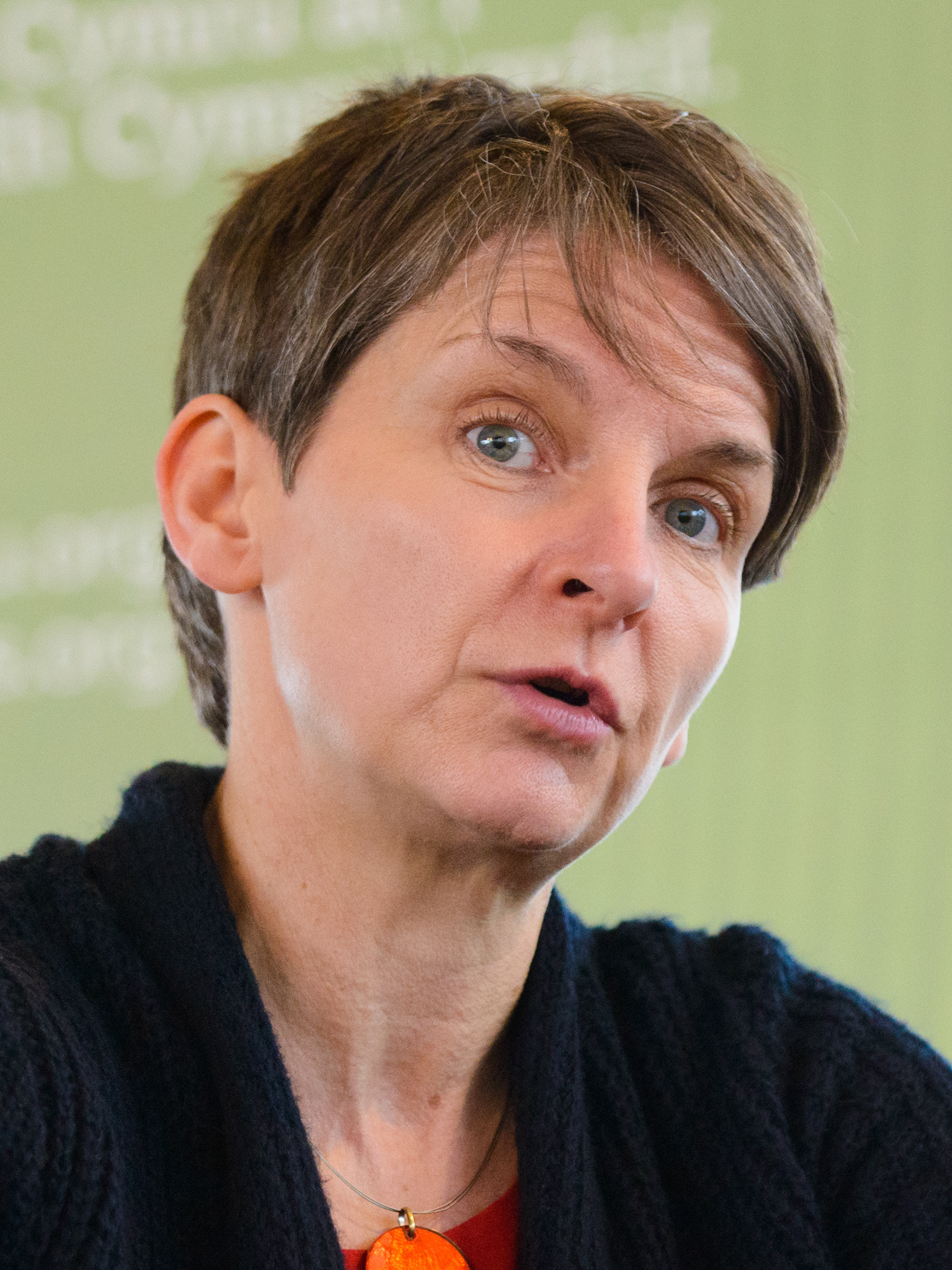
Laura McAllister - Former professional footballer for Wales national team; currently UEFA Vice-President and professor of Public Policy.

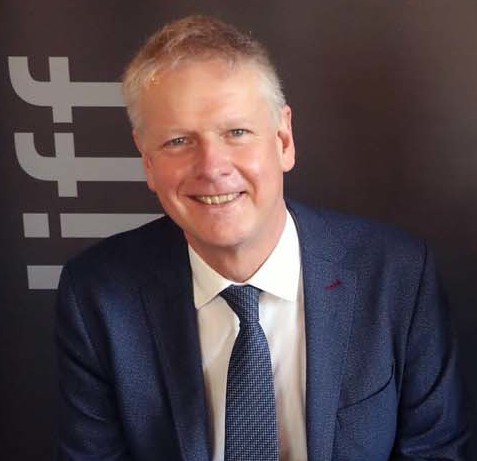
Colin Riordan - Former Vice-chancellor of Cardiff University, the first openly bisexual person to hold this position

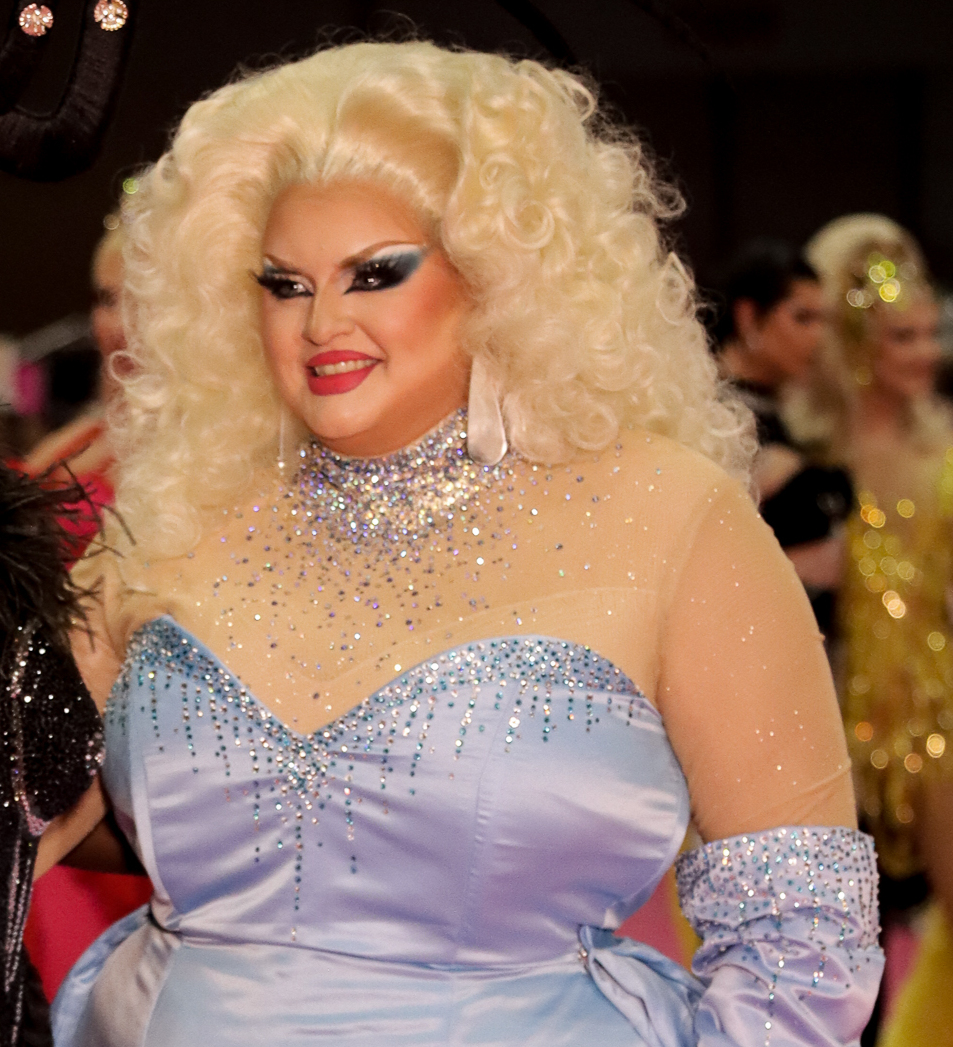
Victoria Scone - Drag performer, known for competing in RuPaul's Drag Race UK series 3 and Canada's Drag Race: Canada vs. the World season 1

== See also ==
- Iris Prize
- LGBT culture
- LGBTQ history in Wales
