= LGBTQ history in Wales =

LGBTQ history in Wales covers the social, political, and cultural histories of the lesbian, gay, bisexual, transgender, intersex, and queer communities in Wales and how Welsh institutions and society have interacted with them.

== Mythology ==
Within Welsh mythology there are several examples of figures who possess homosexual or transgender qualities.

Brân the Blessed was the giant king of Britain. Christopher Penczak claimed that Robert Graves believed that Brân was worshipped by "an order of homosexual priests, and Amathon, a version of the Green Man, wrests Bran’s secret magical name by seducing one of Brân’s priests". However, it is argued by some, namely the 1960 introduction to The White Goddess by Robert Graves, that this is a misquotation of Graves.

Within the Mabinogion is the tale of Gwydion and Gilfaethwy. As a punishment for the rape of Goewin, Gilfaethwy and Gwydion are transformed into various animals by their uncle, Math fab Mathonwy. Whilst in these transformations, the two mate and have three children: Hyddwn, Hychddwn, and Bleiddwn.

Gwrach y Rhibyn is a monstrous Welsh spirit in the shape of a hideously ugly woman who is said to appear before a person shortly before their death. She is known to call out the person's name and then, in her female form, shriek "Fy ngŵr, fy ngŵr!" (My husband! My husband!) or, when in her male form, shriek "Fy ngwraig! Fy ngwraig!" (My wife! My wife!) or "Fy mhlentyn, fy mhlentyn bach!" (My child! My little child!).

== Roman era ==
The head of a sculpture uncovered in Caerleon, believed to be of the Greek-Roman god Attis, suggests the existence of the cult of Attis, as well as the possibility of Galli priests residing in Wales. The Galli hold an "ambiguous space in Roman notions of gender" as they were known for castrating themselves, as well as wearing woman's clothing.

== 18th century ==
In 1778, Eleanor Butler (1739–1829) and Sarah Ponsonby (1755–1831), known as the Ladies of Llangollen, moved into their home at Plas Newydd. Originally from Ireland, they lived in Llangollen for fifty years alongside their housekeeper Mary Caryll, next to whom they are buried in St Collen's Church. There is a memorial to all three women in the churchyard.

== 19th century ==
At some point, roughly 1865–1872, Abel Jones, regarded by some as "the prince of ballad-singers", wrote the ballad Can Newydd, which tells of two women who cross-dressed in order to have sex with other women.

== 20th century ==
=== 1920s ===
In 1924, Edward Prosser Rhys, a Welsh journalist, poet and publisher, won the National Eisteddfod in Pontypool for his poem "Atgof" ("Memory"), despite it being controversial due to its homosexual content. The poem is extensively about sex, most often heterosexual but there is a short section about a gay experience. It has been speculated that it could be about Morris T. Williams, a close male acquaintance of Prosser Rhys who at the time was married to Kate Roberts.

In 1928, Kate Roberts and Morris T. Williams married, after meeting at Plaid Cymru meetings. Williams was a printer, and eventually they bought the printing and publishing house Gwasg Gee (The Gee Press), Denbigh, and moved to live in the town in 1935. The press published books, pamphlets and the Welsh-language weekly Y Faner (The Banner), for which Roberts wrote regularly. Both Kate and Morris are believed to have had homosexual tendencies. In a letter to her husband, Kate describes kissing a butcher's wife, saying: "There was nothing that gave me more pleasure".

=== 1950s ===
On 20 July 1958, Margaret Haig Thomas, 2nd Viscountess Rhondda died. She was a Welsh peeress, businesswoman and suffragette. She was raised at Llanwern House, until the age of 13, when she was sent away to boarding school. In 1908, she married landowner and soldier Humphrey Mackworth, but they ended up getting a divorce in 1922 Following her divorce, she lived with Helen Archdale, editor of the Time and Tide magazine, and also Theodora Bosanquet, amanuensis to Henry James.

=== 1960s ===
In 1974, Jan Morris—a Welsh writer, named by The Times as the fifteenth greatest of Britain's post-war writers—published the book Conundrum, her first book under her new name, after transitioning. It was one of the first autobiographies to discuss a personal gender reassignment. (Note: The opening lines of Conundrum: "I was three or perhaps four years old when I realized that I had been born into the wrong body, and should really be a girl. I remember the moment well, and it is the earliest memory of my life.") Morris began transitioning to live as a woman in 1964, and was one of the first high-profile people to do so.

In 1967, following the failure of the government to implement the Wolfenden Report, Cardiffian MP Leo Abse—with the support of Roy Jenkins, the then Labour Home Secretary—introduced the Sexual Offences Act 1967.

=== 1970s ===
In 1972, the minutes of the weekly medical officers’ meetings, contained within the North East Wales Archives, include a brief note that “a transsexualist patient was requesting a penectomy”.

=== 1980s ===
On 10 June 1980, a union requested Clwyd County Council to include a non-discrimination clause on the grounds of sexual orientation in their terms and conditions of employment, which they refused. It wasn't until 2003, when the Employment Equality (Sexual Orientation) Regulations 2003 were introduced that any widespread non-discrimination clause was implemented.

On 29 August 1980, an article was published by the South Wales Echo on a national campaign for homosexual rights that was to be led, for the first time, from South Wales—by Professor Michael Jarrett, of the archaeology department at University College, Cardiff.

On 4 July 1982, Welshman Terry Higgins died of AIDS in St Thomas’ Hospital. The charity the Terry Higgins Trust was set up in his name by his partner Rupert Whitaker and friend Martyn Butler, it was the first UK AIDS charity.

In 1984, Lesbians and Gays Support the Miners (LGSM), was launched. It was an alliance of members of the LGBT+ community who supported the 1984–1985 miners' strike. By 1985, eleven LGSM groups had been formed in the UK. The film, Pride, released in 2014, covers a dramatised version of the story.

=== 1990s ===
In Rhyl in 1997, the same year as Welsh devolution, the West Rhyl Young People’s Project was set up. The aim of the project was to support teenage gays and lesbians through the creation of an LGBT support group called Deuce (later renamed VIVA). In collaboration with Clwyd Alyn Housing, they also run a housing scheme for homeless LGBTIQ+ youth up to 28, called Tŷ Pride.

In 1998, Labour MP Ann Keen from Buckley, introduces an age of consent amendment to the Crime and Disorder Act 1998, changing the age of consent for homosexuals from 18 to 16. The Act was passed in the House of Commons with a majority of 207, however, the House of Lords threw it out, voting against by 290 to 122. The government reintroduced the measure in January 1999 under the Sexual Offences (Amendment) Act 2000. After failing to get through the House of Lords twice, on 30 November 2000, the government threatened the use of Parliament Acts 1911 and 1949, and a few hours later, the Act received royal assent.

In September 1999, the first Cardiff Mardi Gras (now Pride Cymru) took place in Bute Park, Cardiff, as a response to an increase in hate crime in South Wales. Over 5,000 people attended this inaugural event.

== 21st century ==
=== 2000s ===
In April 2000, the AM for Monmouth, David Davies, came under fire for organising an exhibition in support of Section 28. In a letter, William Hague, then leader of the Conservative party, said he "very much welcomed the initiative of David Davies in organising the exhibition". However, other AMs condemned the exhibition. Plaid Cymru's spokesperson for equality issues, Helen Mary Jones, said "this initiative of his is deliberately setting out to shock and removes the focus away from a proper debate on sexual equality".

In March 2004, Cardiff Lions RFC was formed, it was the first gay and inclusive rugby union team in Wales.

In 2008, South Wales Gay Men’s Chorus is formed by Andrew Bulleyment.

In 2008, Cardiff Dragons FC was founded and was Wales' first LGBTQ+ football team.

In 2009, Gwent Police and North Wales Police flew the rainbow flag, they were the first public organisations to do so in Wales.

In 2009, Gareth Thomas was the first known professional athlete to come out, whilst still competing in professional sport.
