= Pride celebrations in Wales =

LGBTQ events in Wales

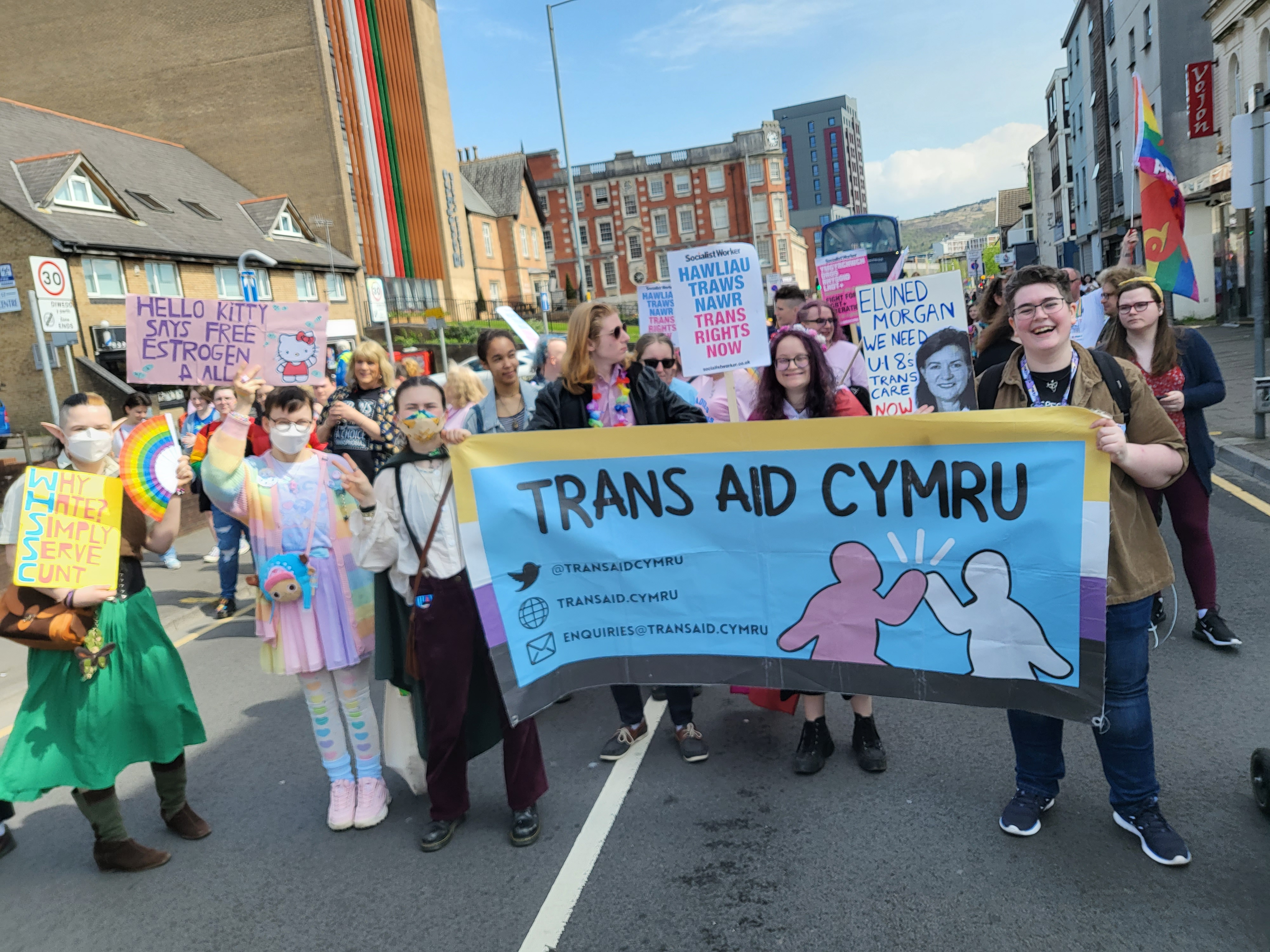
Welsh trans organisation Trans Aid Cymru at Swansea Pride in 2023

Pride celebrations occur annually in Wales. Many take place in the summer, particularly in the month of June (Pride Month). Pride celebrations are also held in other months of the year, including May, July, August, September and October.

== History ==
Pride celebrations in Wales had been mostly restricted to the largest towns and cities in the country. However, in the late 2010s and early 2020s more Pride events have been held across Wales. Mark Etheridge, curator of the LGBTQ+ collection at St Fagans National Museum of Wales said that since 2018 "we have seen an explosion of first Pride events in Wales... in places like Llantwit Major, Barry, Llandrindod Wells and Hay on Wye. This demonstrates how Pride events are no longer just being held in places like Cardiff and Swansea, but across the whole of Wales." adding that he had attended many of these events himself and acquired objects there for the collection.

== Welsh language presence ==
The LGBTQIA+ community in Wales has many Welsh speakers, including drag queens Actavia and Catrin Feelings, featured on RuPaul's Drag Race UK series 6 and 7 respectively. However, Welsh-language representation at Pride events in Wales is often small compared to the English-language provision.

In 1985 the first gay Pride march was held in Wales in Cardiff, by members of Cardiff University's GaySoc (the university's lesbian and gay student society). In footage captured of the event, one marcher can be seen carrying a Welsh-language placard whose text reads "Mae hoyw yn hwyl" which translates to "Gay is fun" in English. Welsh-language protest banners were made in 1991 and 1992 by the Aberystwyth-based organisation CYLCH (Cymdeithas Lesbiaid a Hoywon Cymraeg eu Hiaith) which was a society for Welsh-speaking gay and lesbian people. The banners were used at protests against Section 28 outside Aberystwyth Town Hall.

Mas ar y Maes was founded in 2018 by Stonewall and provides a LGBTQIA+-focused presence at the National Eisteddfod of Wales. In 2023 organisers of the National Eisteddfod said that a consultation found interest for an LGBTQIA+ Eisteddfod event.

== Pride celebrations by county and borough ==
=== Anglesey / Ynys Môn ===
==== Llangefni ====
In 2024, Llangefni hosted North Wales Pride.

=== Blaenau Gwent ===
==== Blaenau Gwent ====
Blaenau Gwent held its first Pride celebration on 24 May 2025.

=== Bridgend ===
==== Bridgend ====
Bridgend Pride is celebrated in the month of June. Its most recent celebration was 6 June 2026.

==== Porthcawl ====
Porthcawl Pride Party was most recently celebrated on 7 June 2025.

=== Caerphilly ===
==== Caerphilly ====
Caerphilly's Pride is called Pride Caerffili and is celebrated in the month of July. The first event took place in 2023, with the event being held by Caerphilly County Borough Council. In 2025 the event was opened by Lauren Price. Its next scheduled event took place on 4 July 2026.

=== Cardiff ===
==== Cardiff ====
The first Pride in Cardiff took place in July 1985 in the form of a parade on Queen Street organised by Cardiff University's GaySoc (the university's lesbian and gay student society). Parades were also held in subsequent years, in 1986 and 1987. Tim Foskett, one of the organisers of the parades, recalled in 2020 that the two subsequent parades received a lot more negative attention due to the HIV/AIDS epidemic, saying "We got a lot more hostility in 1986 and 1987 and I remember several people actually saying to me as we handed out flyers 'You should go to the gas chambers', things like that".

Pride Cymru takes place in the city of Cardiff annually in June and last took place between 13 and 14 June 2026. The event first took place on 4 September 1999 (then called Cardiff Mardi Gras) in Bute Park, drawing around 2000 attendees. The Mardi Gras was organised following an increase in hate crime in South Wales. South Wales Police approached members of the LGBTQIA+ community to find a solution to the problem. The event was renamed Pride Cymru in 2014 and relocated to City Hall Lawns in 2017.

Big Queer Picnic was first held in August 2012 after the founders felt like Cardiff needed an alternative grassroots pride event. It is run as a free community based event celebrating sexual and gender diversity. It is usually held on the Saturday of Pride Cymru in Sophia Gardens, Cardiff.

Trans Pride Cardiff is next celebrated 23 August 2026. It was founded in 2018 and ran its first event in 2019, citing transphobic events at Pride in London and commercialism at Pride as the reason for its foundation.

The first BAME Pride held in Wales was hosted by Glitter Cymru in August 2019. Held as a community event to highlight the joy and diversity of the BAME LGBTQ+ community in Cardiff. Due to the COVID-19 pandemic a second event didn't take place until 2022, with the event rebranded as Glitter Pride. It has returned annually since then, and has been funded by the Grassroots Pride Fund.

=== Carmarthenshire ===
==== Carmarthen ====
Carmarthen Pride is celebrated in the month of August. It is next scheduled for 29 August 2026.

==== Llandeilo ====
Llandeilo Pride is celebrated in the month of June. It was most recently celebrated on 20 June 2026.

==== Llanelli ====
Llanelli Pride is celebrated in the month of July. It was most recently celebrated on 11 July 2026.

=== Ceredigion ===
==== Aberystwyth ====
Aberystwyth Pride is celebrated in the month of April, with the most recent celebration taking place on 25 April 2026, where it was organised by Project LUNA for the first time. Aberystwyth Pride has been celebrated in 2023, 2024 and 2026, with 2025 being used to fundraise for the 2026 celebrations. It first took place on the 22 April 2023.

=== Conwy ===
==== Colwyn Bay ====
Colwyn Bay Pride is celebrated in the month of May.

=== Denbighshire ===
==== Rhyl ====
Rhyl most recently held a pride event on the 20th of June 2026, with the event being called its "biggest ever".

=== Flintshire ===
==== Flint ====
Flint has previously held a Pride celebration.

=== Glamorgan ===
==== Barry ====
Barry Pride is celebrated in June. It was most recently celebrated 6 June 2026.

==== Cowbridge ====
Cowbridge Pride 2026

Cowbridge Pride is celebrated in June. It was last celebrated in June 2026.

=== Gwynedd ===
==== Bethesda ====
North Wales Pride has been celebrated in the town of Bethesda.

=== Merthyr Tydfil ===
==== Merthyr Tydfil ====
Merthyr Pride is next scheduled to take place in 2026. No event was held in 2025 due to "capacity issues".

=== Monmouthshire ===
==== Abergavenny ====
Abergavenny Pride is celebrated in the month of June. It was most recently celebrated on 27 June 2026 at Abergavenny Castle. Abergavenny Pride was first established in 2019 after a group of friends discussed the lack of visible LGBTQIA+ presence in the town.

==== Caldicot ====
Caldicot Pride is celebrated in the month of August. It is next celebrated on 15 August 2026 in Caldicot Castle.

==== Monmouth ====
Monmouth Pride is celebrated in the month of June. It was most recently celebrated on 6 June 2026.

=== Neath Port Talbot ===
==== Neath Port Talbot ====
Neath Port Talbot Pride is celebrated in the month of October. It is next scheduled for 17 October 2026.

==== Pontardawe ====
Pontardawe Pride is celebrated in the month of June. It was most recently celebrated on 6 June 2026. Its first Pride took place in 2025.

=== Newport ===
==== Newport City ====
Newport City will host UK Pride 2026 in September 2026 and will be the first Welsh Pride to do so.

Newport held its first Pride event, Pride in the Port, in September 2022. The first event was held in Belle Vue Park with acts performing in the bandstand and community stalls set up throughout. The 2023 event included a march through Newport city centre, stages set up along the riverfront, and a two-day event schedule.

The next event will take place on 5 September 2026 as part of the UK Pride celebrations.

=== Pembrokeshire ===
==== Pembrokeshire ====
Pembrokeshire Pride is celebrated annually.

=== Powys ===
==== Brecon ====
Brecon Pride is celebrated in the month of July. It is next scheduled for 25 July 2026. The first iteration of Brecon Pride occurred in 2023 with assistance from a team of volunteers and Brecon Town Council.

==== Machynlleth ====
Machynlleth Pride is celebrated in the month of May, with its most recent celebration falling on 16 May 2026. The event attracted over 500 people.

=== Rhondda Cynon Taf ===
==== Rhondda Cynon Taf ====
Rhondda Cynon Taf (RCT) celebrates pride in the month of July. The next RCT Pride celebration is scheduled for 25 July 2026.

=== Swansea ===
==== Swansea ====
Swansea Pride is celebrated in the month of May, with its most recent celebration falling on 16 May 2026. The Pride Parade's route takes attendees through the centre of the city. In 2026, it began at Wind Street and ended at Guildhall Road South.

=== Torfaen ===
==== Torfaen ====
Torfaen Pride is celebrated in the month of June, with its most recent celebration on 6 June 2026.

=== Wrexham ===
==== Wrexham ====
Wrexham Pride is celebrated in the month of July. It is next due to take place on 25 July 2026.
