= Asian Welsh people =

Welsh people of Asian descent

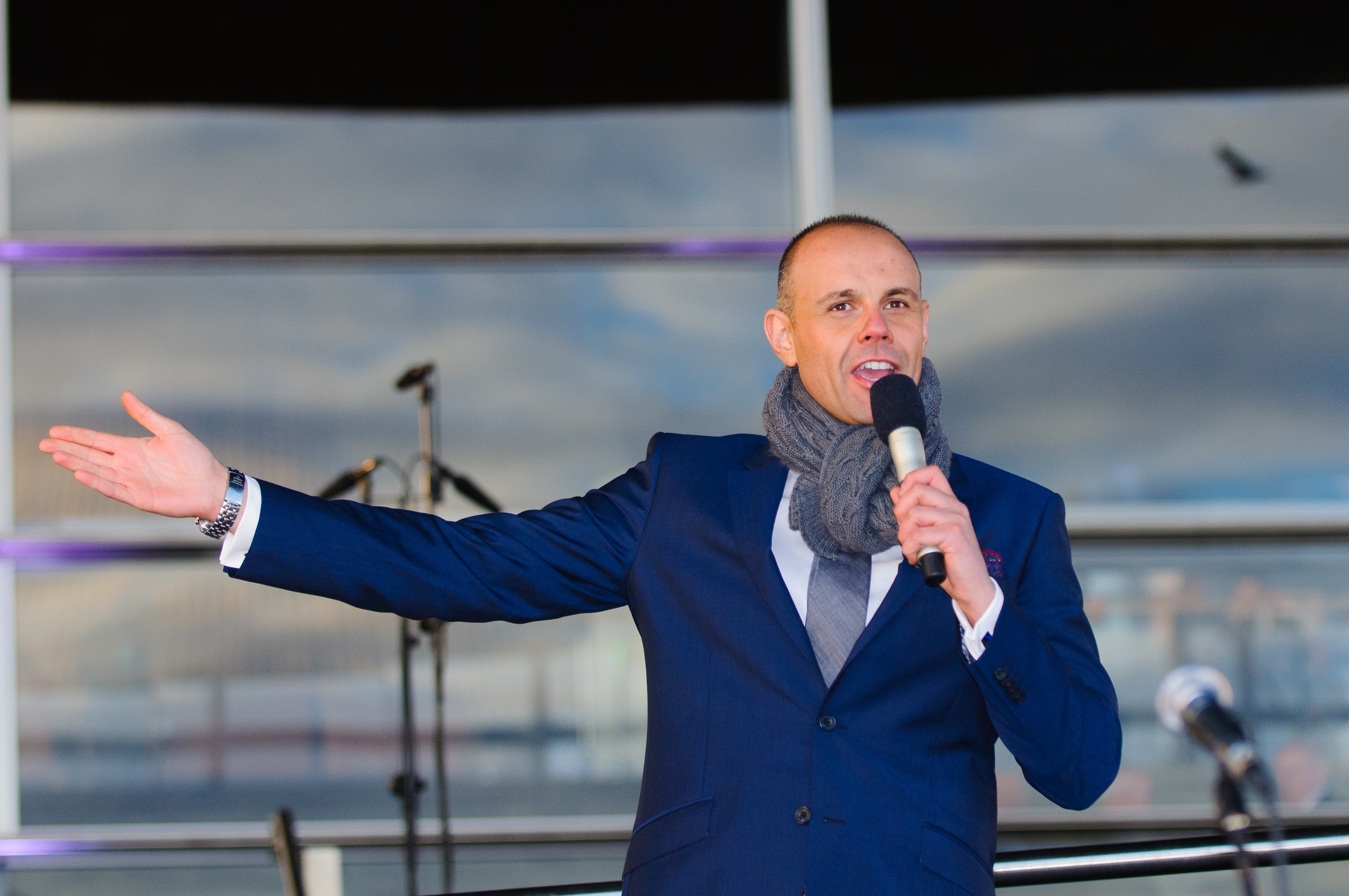
Jason Mohammad

Asian Welsh people are people of Asian heritage who live in Wales, Welsh people of Asian heritage or people with mixed Asian and Welsh heritage. As in other parts of the United Kingdom, "Asian" typically refers to people of South Asian origin: in the census category this means those of Indian, Pakistani, or Bangladeshi heritage. There are also options for people of Chinese or other Asian ancestry; in which other South Asian backgrounds like Sri Lankan are included, as well as other Asian backgrounds, like Filipino, for example.

== Demography ==
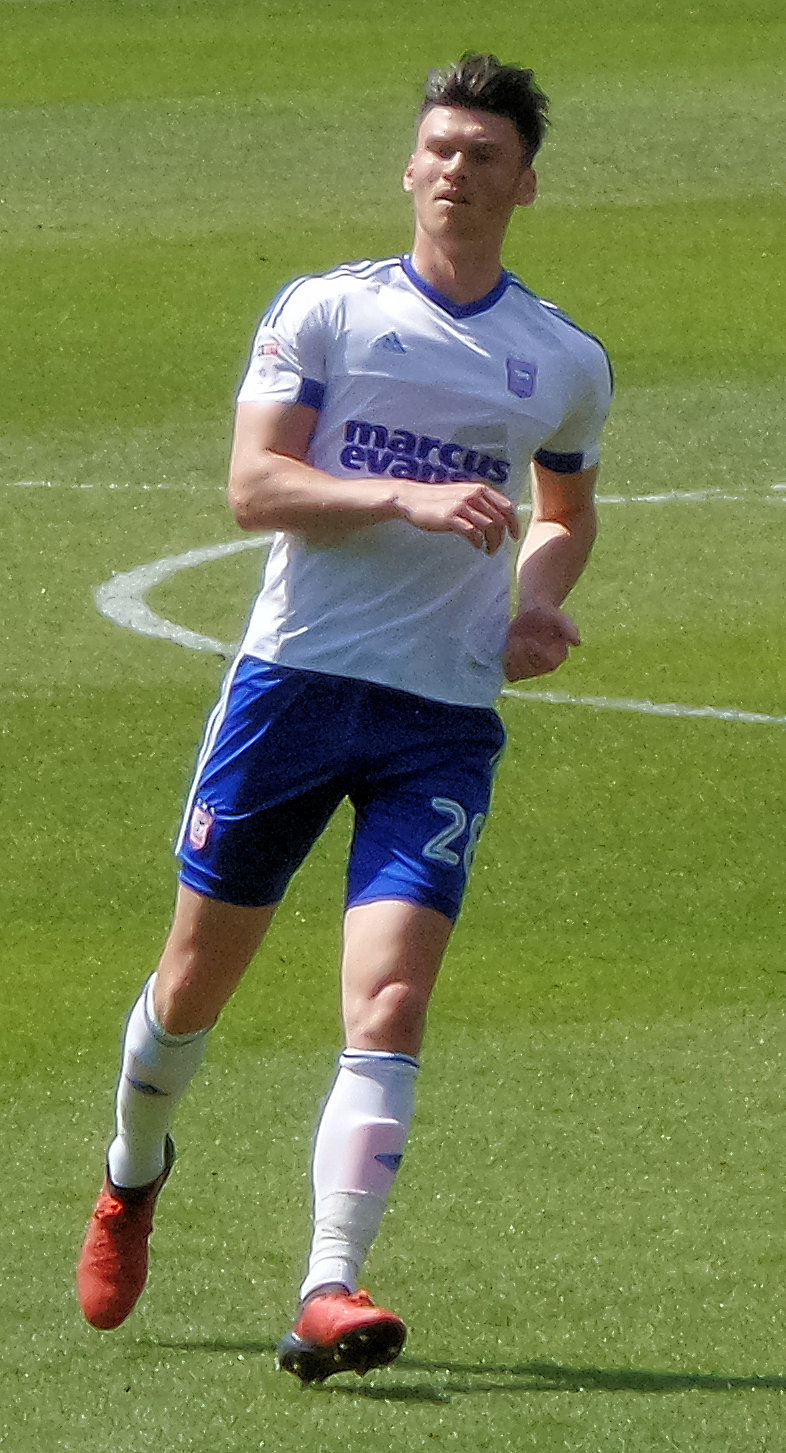
Kieffer Moore

In 2016, the Welsh Assembly of the time (now Welsh Parliament/Senedd Cymru) was criticised for not having a "Welsh Asian" tick box for polling purposes on an equalities form issued in Wales, by the Welsh Assembly.

The second largest "high-level" ethnicity category in Wales in 2021 was “Asian, Asian Welsh or Asian British”. 89,000 people identified as this category, which is 2.9% of the Welsh population. This compares to 2.3% in 2011.

Ethnic group	Year							
Ethnic group	1991		2001		2011		2021	
Ethnic group	Population	%	Population	%	Population	%	Population	%
Asian or Asian British: Total	24,399	0.9%	31,714	1.1%	70,129	2.3%	89,028	3%
Asian or Asian British: Indian	6,384	0.2%	8,261	0.3%	17,256	0.6%	21,070	0.7%
Asian or Asian British: Pakistani	5,717	0.2%	8,287	0.3%	12,229	0.4%	17,534	0.6%
Asian or Asian British: Bangladeshi	3,820	0.2%	5,436	0.2%	10,687	0.3%	15,314	0.5%
Asian or Asian British: Chinese (Note: In 2001, listed under the 'Chinese or other ethnic group' heading.)	4,801	0.3%	6,267	0.3%	13,638	0.4%	14,454	0.5%
Asian or Asian British: Asian Other	3,677	0.1%	3,464	0.1%	16,318	0.6%	20,656	0.9%

== Notable Asian Welsh people ==
=== Acting and film ===
- Banita Sandhu
- Danielle Bux
- Jessica Sula
- Sally El Hosaini

=== Art ===
- Alia Syed

=== Authors ===
- Shereen El Feki

=== Business ===
- Shelim Hussain
- Albert Gubay

=== Medical ===
- David Nott

=== Politics ===
- Zaynub Akbar
- Natasha Asghar
- Mohammad Asghar
- Neil McEvoy

=== Singing ===
- Andy Scott-Lee
- Lisa Scott-Lee

=== Sport ===
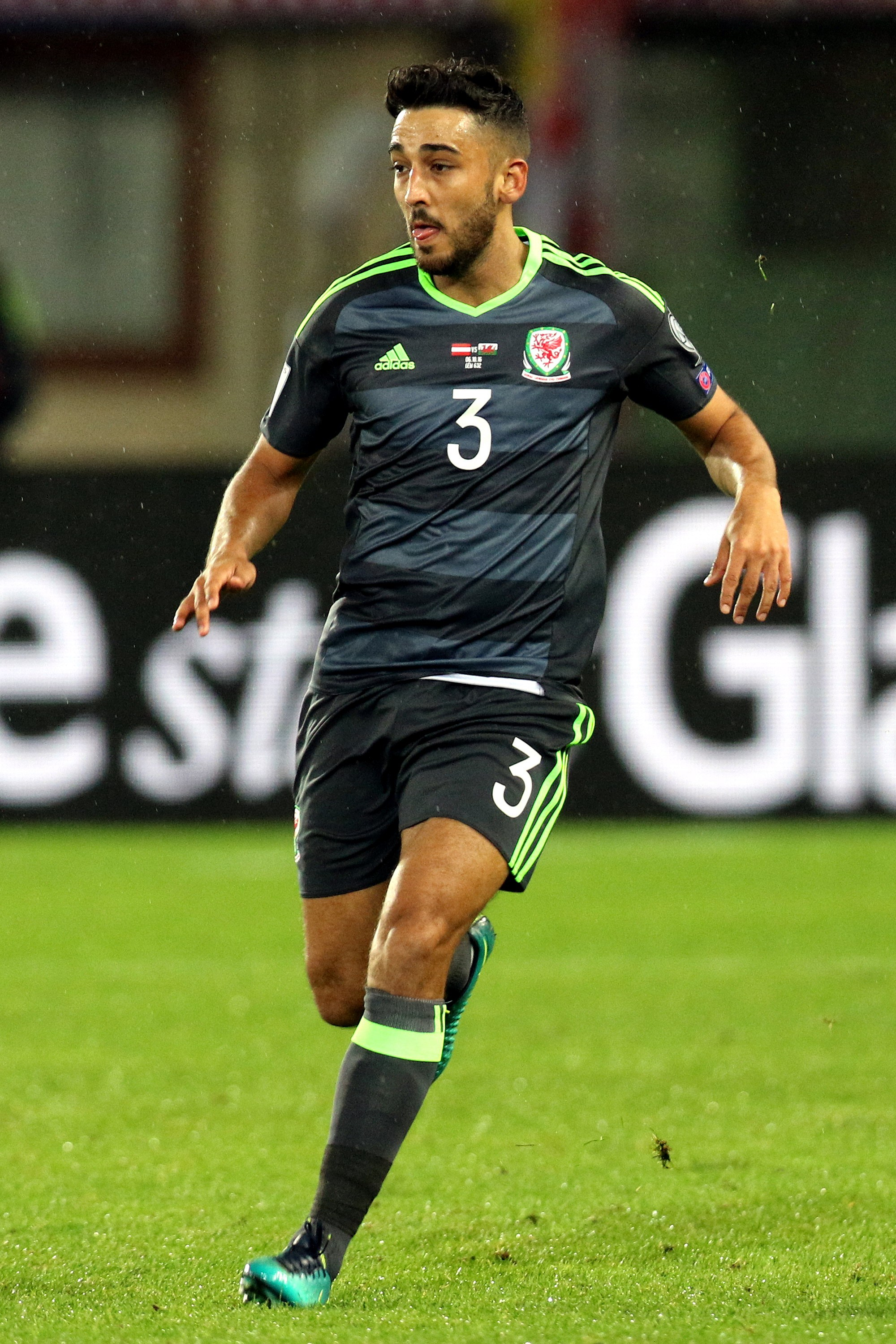
Neil Taylor (footballer)

- Neil Johnson (footballer)
- Prem Sisodiya
- Kishan Hirani
- Anoma Sooriyaarachchi
- Kieffer Moore
- Kaid Mohamed
- Barry Jones (boxer)
- Mika Chunuonsee
- Tom Ramasut
- Clive Rees
- Tal Dunne
- Vimal Yoganathan

=== Television and radio ===
- Jason Mohammad

=== Other ===
- Abbas Farid
- Sabrina Cohen-Hatton
- Shash Appan

== In popular culture ==
The Indian Doctor is a BBC comedy drama set in a 1960s Welsh mining village of Trefelin which shows the impact that a Delhi graduate has on the village.
