= Shash Appan =

Welsh LGBT+ and anti-racist activist

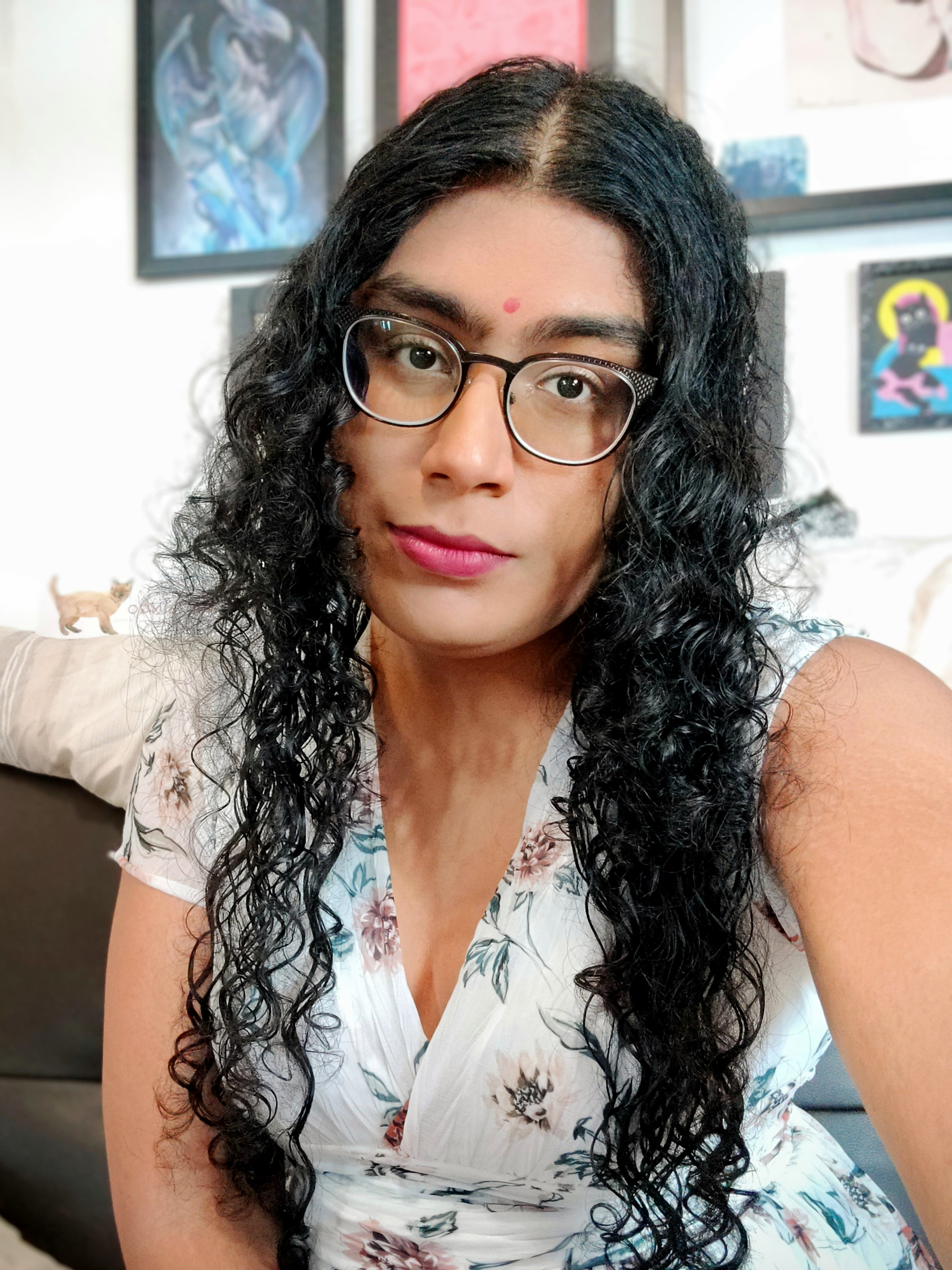
- Born: August 1996 (age 29)
- Known for: LGBT+ and anti-racism activism
- Website: itsshash.com

Shash Appan is a Welsh LGBT+ and anti-racist activist. A co-founder of Trans Aid Cymru, she also serves as a director of the Trans Safety Network. She has also advocated for tenant rights, co-founding a website for tenants in Cardiff to anonymously rate their landlords.

== Early life and education ==
Appan is of Indian descent, and grew up in Birmingham. She came out to her parents at the age of 18 but they were not accepting. After she made a suicide attempt they had her sectioned, then sent her to live in isolation with her grandparents in India for two years, before persuading them to let her return to Britain. After a period of homelessness, Appan received an offer to study computer science at Cardiff Metropolitan University and moved to the city.

== Activism ==
In 2020, she organised several protests in Cardiff calling for reform of the Gender Recognition Act 2004.

In March 2021, she raised concerns about a hustings held online by the Youth Cymru charity in which Plaid Cymru MS Helen Mary Jones was invited to speak, despites Jones having repeatedly made controversial comments about transgender people. After attempting to raise concerns, she was subsequently kicked out of the hustings after displaying the trans pride flag in her profile picture. The controversy led to the resignations of two of the charity's trustees. In August 2021, she was named to Wales Online's Pinc List of the most influential LGBT+ people in Wales.

In April 2022, she gave a speech at a protest held by Trans Aid Cymru in front of the Tŷ William Morgan - William Morgan House calling for a ban on conversion therapy and talking about her experience as a survivor of conversion therapy. In June 2022, she gave a speech at a PinkNews reception held at the National Museum Cardiff in which she condemned British politicians, some of whom were in attendance, for stoking transphobia within British society, saying in particular that "transphobia is essentially Tory policy".
