= Terry Higgins =

Welsh prominent early AIDS death (1945–1982)

- Born: Terrence Lionel Seymour Higgins; 10 June 1945; Pembrokeshire, Wales
- Died: 4 July 1982 (aged 37); London, England
- Known for: First British person known to die of AIDS

Terrence Lionel Seymour Higgins (10 June 1945 – 4 July 1982) was a Welsh DJ who was among the first people known to die of an AIDS-related illness in the United Kingdom.

== Life ==
Higgins was born in Priory Mount Hospital, Pembrokeshire, Wales. He lived with his mother Marjorie at 13 Priory Avenue in Haverfordwest and attended the local all-boys grammar school from 1956 to 1960. Higgins left Haverfordwest as a teenager due to feeling alienated because of his sexuality.

Higgins served in the Royal Navy from 1963 to 1968 and served aboard many vessels, including the frigate, HMS Tartar. After five years of service, he felt it was time to leave. Wanting a quick exit, he informed a senior officer he was gay. While this was at the time a sacking offence the reply came, "If we booted out everyone who was gay, we wouldn't have a Navy left." Denied a discharge, Higgins painted hammer and sickle motifs on the ship and was formally asked to leave.

Higgins was a self-taught piano player and wrote a book inspired by his fascination with astrology, it was published by Marshall Cavendish in 1974, titled The Living Zodiac.

Higgins moved to London and worked as a Hansard reporter in the House of Commons during the day (Higgins started a trade union there) and as a barman and disc jockey at Heaven nightclub in the evenings. Higgins was out and proud and adored gay culture, American culture, books, films, music, clothes, clubbing, he travelled to New York and Amsterdam as a DJ in the 1970s.

In 1980, during the Pride March in London, Higgins saw a drag queen being attacked by the police. Dressed head to toe in leather, he jumped down from the Heaven float he was on and screamed “how dare you bitches attack my friends”, confronting the police with a leather belt in hand.

In 1981 Higgins met Rupert Whitaker in the West End nightclub Bang and they remained together until Higgins death.

Higgins collapsed at the nightclub Heaven while at work and was admitted to St Thomas' Hospital, London where he died of Pneumocystis pneumonia and progressive multifocal leukoencephalopathy on 4 July 1982.

== Legacy ==
Martyn Butler, Rupert Whitaker and Tony Calvert initiated the formation of the Terry Higgins Trust in 1982 with a group of concerned community-members and Terry's friends, including Len Robinson and Chris Peel; it is dedicated to preventing the spread of HIV, promoting awareness of AIDS, and providing supportive services to people with the disease.

== See also ==
- Timeline of early AIDS cases

== Bibliography ==
- Aldrich, Robert; Wotherspoon, Garry, eds. (2001). "Terrence Higgins". Who's Who in Contemporary Gay and Lesbian History: From World War II to the Present Day. Vol. 2. London: Routledge. pp. 187–188. ISBN 978-0-415-22974-6.
