= The Queer Emporium =

LGBT+ social enterprise in Cardiff, Wales

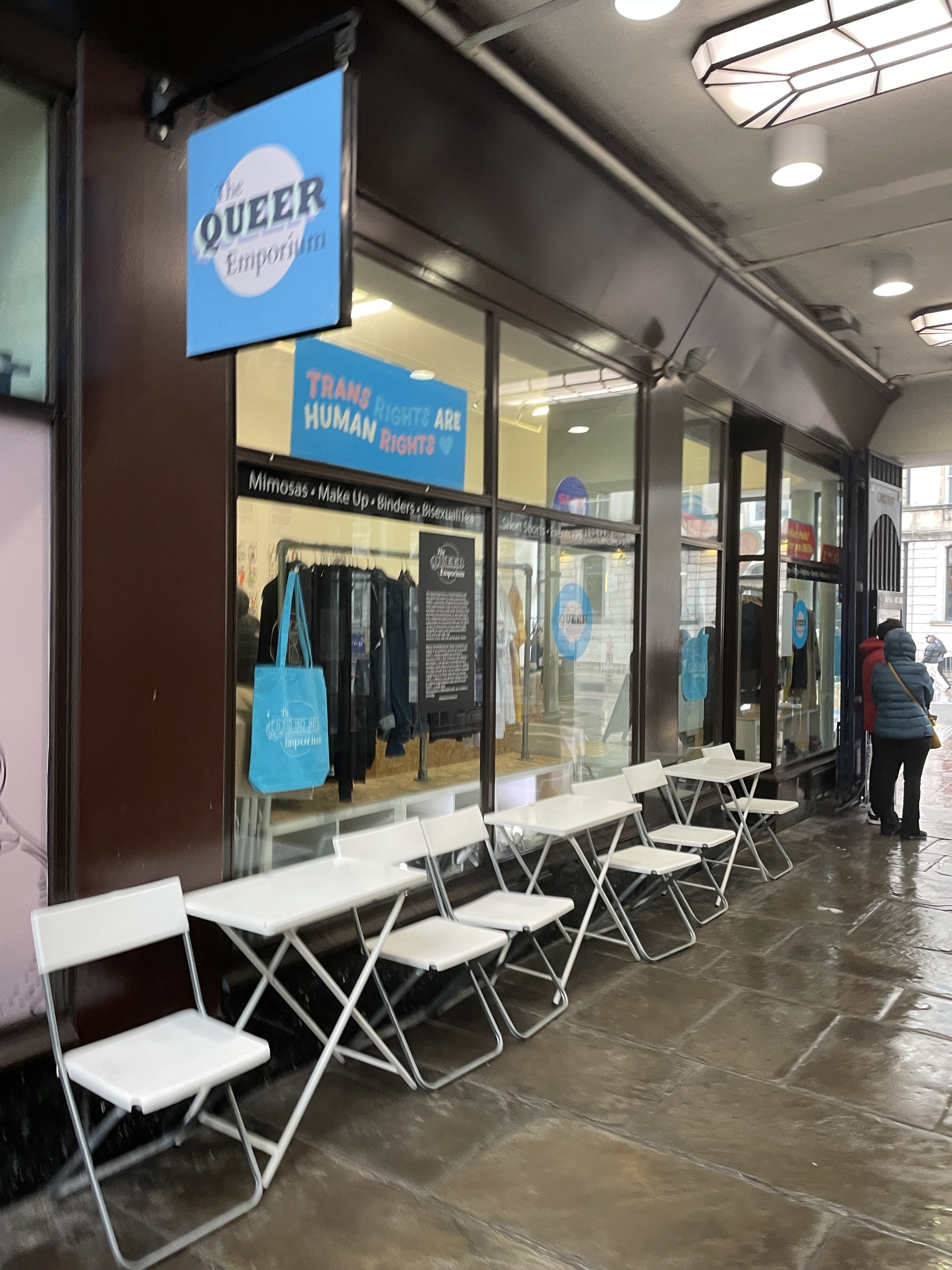
- The Queer Emporium in 2023
- Type: LGBTQ+-owned social enterprise
- Founded: June 2021; 5 years ago in Cardiff, Wales
- Founder: Yan White
- Website: queeremporium.co.uk

The Queer Emporium is an LGBT+ social enterprise and was a café and shop in Cardiff, Wales, almost exclusively operated by trans, intersex and non-binary community members. The physical store consisted of a collective of over 15 local LGBT+ businesses operating in the same premises, which closed in 2026.

== History ==
The Emporium was founded in June 2021, originally as a pop-up shop in the Morgan Arcade for that year's Pride Month. However, after meeting significant success, the shop became permanent in Royal Arcade.

In March 2022, the Emporium announced that it would be hosting the first Queer Fringe Festival to be held in Cardiff history in Pride Month 2022. Later that month, the Iris Prize announced a partnership with the Emporium to host a series of film screenings, with profits going to Trans Aid Cymru.

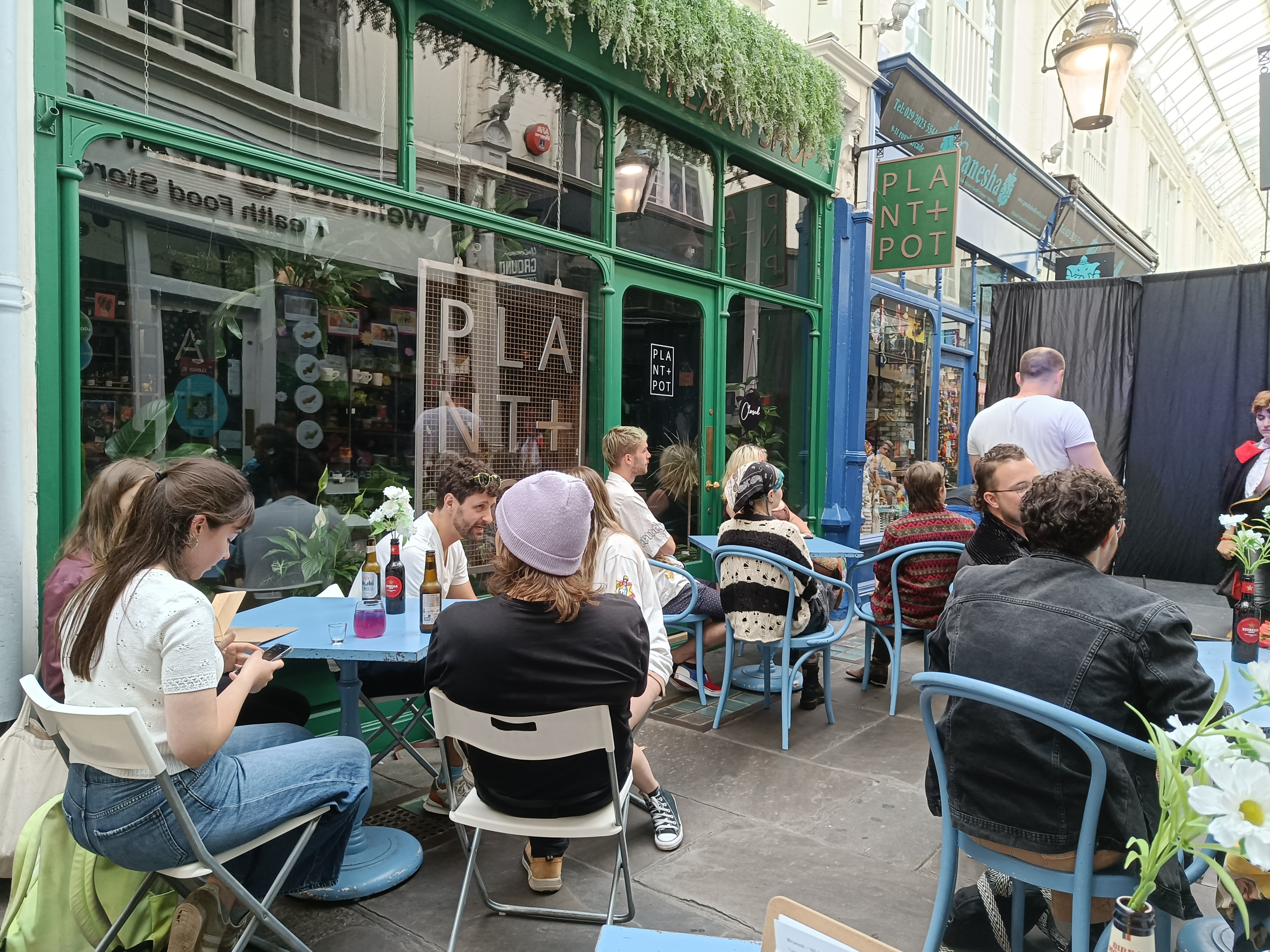
Cabaret-style tables set out in Royal Arcade for an event in June 2025.

The Emporium has "grown into a thriving hub for queer culture and connection", hosting events both in the shop and in Royal Arcade once the arcade has closed for the evening, including free and affordable events such as a queer parents morning, crafting clubs and "speed friendshipping". They also offer community aid programmes such as a binder recycling scheme.

For Pride Month 2025, The Emporium worked with Jack Arts and photographer Chillee Noir to create a poster campaign around Cardiff.

The Queer Emporium being cleaned after its 31 August 2026 closure

In March 2026, the Emporium announced that their Royal Arcade café and store would be closing at the end of August, but that they would be retaining their online presence and were working to open a new bigger and more accessible venue in the near future as well as looking at festival pop-ups working with other Cardiff venues.

On 29 August 2026, BBC Cymru Wales announced that The Queer Emporium was a finalist for a BBC Make a Difference Community Group award, having been nominated by Leila Navabi.⁣

== Controversies and attacks ==
In June 2022, the Emporium issued a statement condemning the decision by Cardiff Council to grant a licence to a Blame Gloria cocktail bar franchise in the location next to the shop, saying that a crowded daytime drinking venue could pose safety concerns to the Emporium's customers. A petition launched by the Emporium against the Council's decision gathered over 3500 signatures.

On 31 October 2022, the venue was targeted by a 17-year-old neo-Nazi. A smoke bomb was thrown into the venue, damaging the floor. The Emporium had been targeted as it was considered a centre for the local LGBTQ+ community. The Emporium addressed the incident with a statement on their social media, reminding the community to support queer venues.

The shop was also targeted on Christmas Day, 25 December 2023, as someone smashed their window. The shop was set to open at 4:30pm to offer a space to LGBTQ+ community members during the holiday. They made an announcement about the damage, and let patrons know they might be open later than usual due to the damage.
