= Draig Binc =

Welsh magazines

Draig Binc (English: Pink Dragon) refers to two magazines published by members of the Welsh-speaking gay and lesbian communities in the 1990s.

The first magazine was created by London-based Welsh gay and lesbian group CYLCH (Welsh: Cymdeithas Lesbiaid a Hoywon Cymraeg eu Hiaith, 'Society of Welsh-language lesbians and gay men'). However, at almost the same time, an Aberystwyth gay and lesbian group of the same name also published a magazine named Y Draig Binc.

The Welsh Dragon (Welsh: Y Ddraig Goch) is a national symbol of Wales. The dragon is depicted as red on Welsh flags and heraldry. Conversely, the White dragon (Welsh: Y Ddraig Wen), a symbol of the English, is depicted as white. The title of the magazines translates to Pink Dragon and references the colour pink in the LGBTQIA+ community and interblends the Welsh and White dragons.

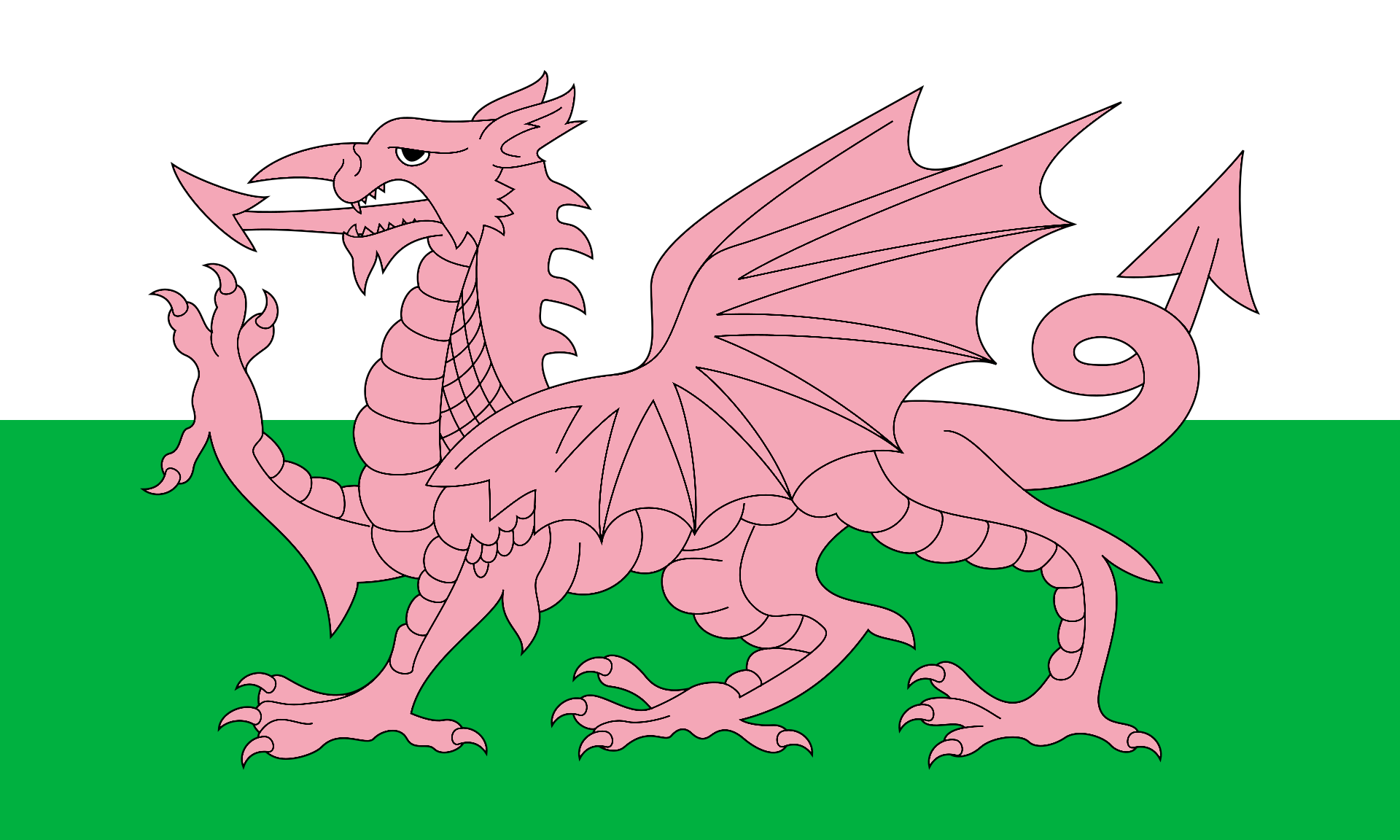
A flag of Wales featuring a pink dragon

Both groups no longer exist, though they are an example of a zeitgeist where two ideas appear in two places at the same time.

== CYLCH Aberystwyth ==
In 1990 CYLCH was championed and created by Berwyn Rowlands, who would later create the Iris Prize Film Festival and who founded the Welsh International Film Festival in Aberystwyth in 1989. During his 15 years in Aberystwyth he was regularly asked to speak about LGBTQIA+ issues on TV and Radio. The organisation published four issues of Y Draig Binc to 1994. In 1992, when exhibiting the magazine at the annual Eisteddfod in Aberystwyth, an anti-gay protestor defaced the group's stall with excrement.

The group created two protest banners for demonstrations organised in 1991 and 1992 against Section 28 in Aberystwyth and for their stall at the National Eisteddfod of Wales. The banner created for the demonstration in 1991 reads "28... 25? Mae'ch cymylau'n hala cryd arnom" (English: 28... 25? Your clauses make us sick). (Note: Section 28 was at times known by other numbers, including 25. It was also referred to as Clause 28, 25 etc.) The banner created for the National Eisteddfod reads "Rhaid newid popeth medd hoywon a lesbiaid" (English: Everything must change say gays and lesbians). Both banners are now preserved at St Fagans National Museum of History near Cardiff.

In 1998 John Davies, a former member of staff in the department of Welsh History at Aberystwyth University 1973–1990 and warden of the Welsh-speaking Pantycelyn Hall student accommodation 1974–1992, penned a response to the scandal involving Ron Davies in the Welsh journal Barn (English: Opinion). Ron Davies had been mugged at knifepoint on Clapham Common, which was a well-known gay meeting place. John Davies wrote a response to homophobic media coverage of the scandal, titled "Arwr Gwlad a Thref" (English: Town and Country Hero) expressing his dismay at the public response to the scandal thus far. He also expressed sadness that someone from Y Draig Binc had described Pantycelyn Hall, where he had previously served as a warden, as a "cadarnle homoffobia" (English: stronghold of homophobia) and described the magazine as "diddorol ond byrhoedlog" (English: interesting but short-lived).

== See also ==
- Y Ddraig Goch
- Draig Wen
