= Scott McGlynn =

Welsh actor, author, talk show host and LGBT activist

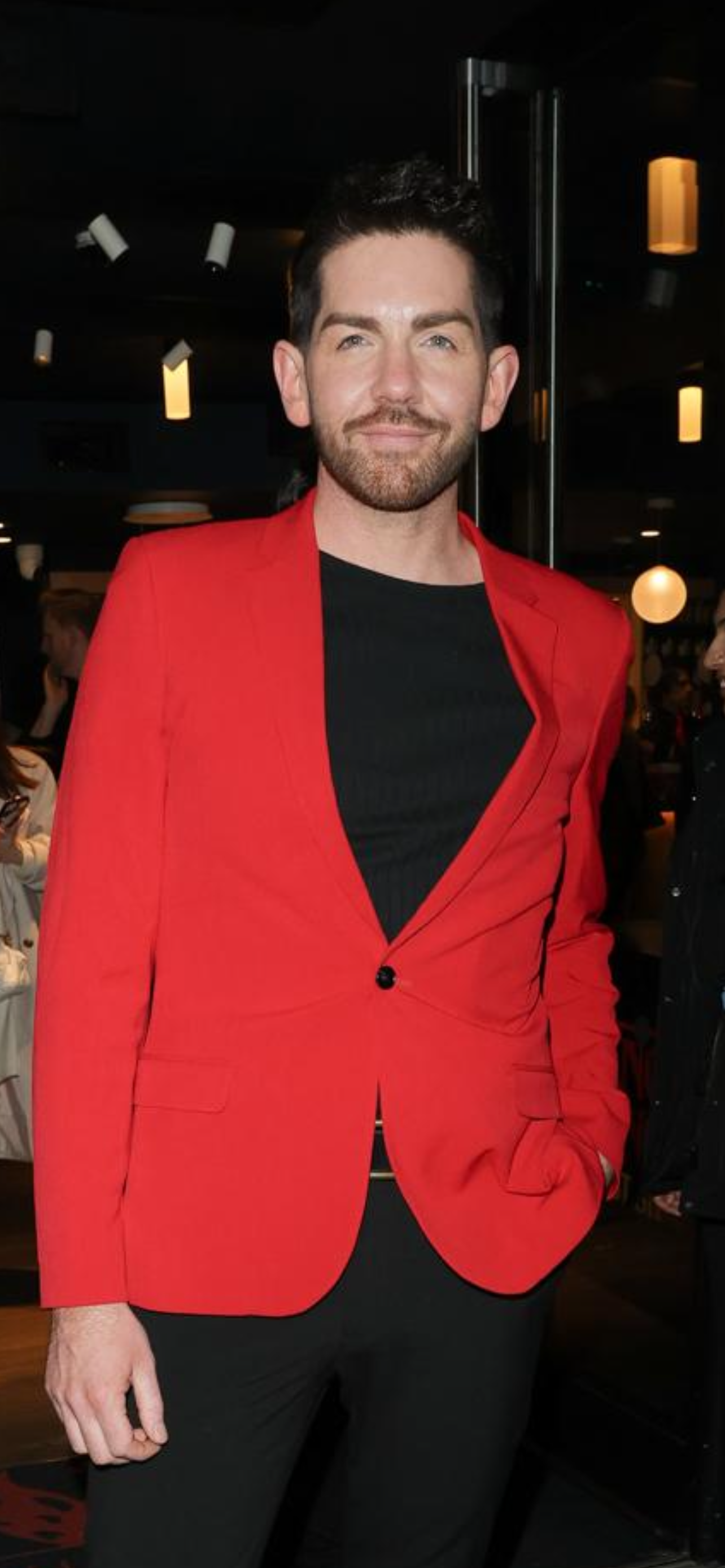
- Born: 10 May 1987 (age 38); Cardiff, Wales
- Education: St Cyres School; Barry College
- Occupations: Actor, Presenter, Celebrity, Content Creator
- Years active: 2015–present
- Known for: Gavin and Stacey; Celebrity Skin Talk; The Scott McGlynn Show; Celebrity Skin Talk

Scott McGlynn (born 10 May 1987) is a Welsh actor, author, talk show host, LGBT activist and digital influencer based in Cardiff, Wales. He is the creator of The Scott McGlynn Show, a podcast centred around celebrity gossip and interviews from the LGBTQ+ community. McGlynn was listed on the Pride Power List for four years continuously from 2016 to 2019.

== Biography ==
=== Early life and education ===
McGlynn was born in 1987, in Cardiff, Wales. He grew up in Barry, Vale of Glamorgan and attended St Cyres School in Penarth and later attended and graduated from Barry College. During his interview with BBC, McGlynn mentioned about bullying that he received at school. As a teenager, bullies targeted him for his acne which had the detrimental effect on his self-esteem.

=== Career ===
McGlynn started a lifestyle and fashion blog in 2015. The blog featured product reviews, opinion pieces and interviews of personalities from TV and music industries. In 2016, he authored and published his first book, Out. The book is autobiographical and inspired by reading about modern cyberbullying. Out also highlights McGlynn's social struggles while growing up and the polarities of being gay and coming out. After the release of Out, McGlynn held several talks and became an active LGBT+ campaigner. He was also nominated for the 2016 Pride Power List.

In 2017, McGlynn created The Scott McGlynn Show, a podcast that highlights celebrities interviews and real-life stories of people from LGBTQ+ community. In 2018, the podcast reached top 5 on the UK iTunes podcast chart. The Scott McGlynn Show has featured several celebrity guests including Perez Hilton, David Yost, Anthony Bowens and various contestants from RuPaul's Drag Race. In the late 2017, McGlynn was featured as a panelist at the Edinburgh Festival of Politics where he spoke about the opportunities and dangers of the digital world.

Beside being an author and a podcast host, McGlynn is also an influencer mostly active on his website and Instagram. In 2019, McGlynn was named a global brand ambassador for Neutrogena.

In 2020, McGlynn launched a new IGTV series, Celebrity Skin Talks, a series featuring interviews with celebrities focusing on their skincare problems. In August 2021, McGlynn began filming for a TV series in Wales.
