= Rupert Whitaker =

British psychiatrist and advocate

- Born: Rupert Edward David Whitaker; 10 June 1963 (age 63)
- Known for: AIDS advocate

Rupert Edward David Whitaker OBE (born 1963) is a British psychiatrist, immunologist, and patient advocate. He is one of Europe's longest-surviving people with HIV, having contracted the disease in 1981. Following the death of his partner, Terrence Higgins, from AIDS in 1982, he co-founded the Terrence Higgins Trust, a charity set up to provide services for people with HIV. In 2007, he founded the Tuke Institute, an international organisation researching the health-effectiveness of medical services.

== Early life ==
Whitaker came out as gay in 1978. He left Lord Wandsworth College in Long Sutton, Hampshire in 1980, aged 17. In 1981, he matriculated at the College of St Hild and St Bede at Durham University to study philosophy and psychology, and during this period his partner Terry Higgins became one of the first people to die from AIDS in the UK. Whitaker became ill and transferred to the University of London, and was not expected to live longer than 12 months.

== The Terrence Higgins Trust ==
In 1982, Whitaker became involved in raising awareness of HIV, then a little-known disease referred to 'Gay-Related Immune Deficiency'. Following his involvement in a conference organised by London Lesbian and Gay Switchboard, he worked with Martyn Butler and Tony Whitehead to develop the Terrence Higgins Trust into a registered charity, helping to establish its educational, mental health, and buddying services, and raising awareness in the media. The Trust was the first European HIV charity to be founded, and is currently one of the leading HIV charities in Europe.

== Personal health ==
In 1993, following his third post-doctoral fellowship, Whitaker was diagnosed with AIDS at the age of 30. Shortly afterwards he had a stroke, which left him with visual, communicative, cognitive, and mobility problems. This required brain surgery that left him with epilepsy. This was followed by a number of years of intensive rehabilitation. In 2006, he was again given less than six months to live because of medications for HIV interacting with his stroke-associated brain-injury, which was misdiagnosed for two years. Due to his extensive experience of health services during this time, including a number of episodes of malpractice, he founded the Tuke Institute in 2007.

== Honours ==
In 2004, Whitaker was awarded a Police Commendation for bravery in the apprehension of an armed and violent robber.

He was appointed Officer of the Order of the British Empire (OBE) in the 2022 Birthday Honours for services to charity and public health.
