= Neil Johnson (footballer) =

English footballer

Personal information
- Full name: Neil Joseph Johnson
- Date of birth: 3 December 1946 (age 79)
- Place of birth: Grimsby, England
- Position: Winger

Senior career*
Years	Team	Apps	(Gls)
1965–1971	Tottenham Hotspur	34	(5)
1970–1971	→ Charlton Athletic (loan)	1	(0)
1971–1972	Torquay United	6	(1)
1972–1973	Dover	?	(?)
Total		41	(6)
- * Club domestic league appearances and goals

Neil Joseph Johnson (born 3 December 1946 in Grimsby, Lincolnshire, England), is an English footballer who played as a winger in the Football League.
