= Terrence Higgins Trust =

British HIV and sexual health charity

- Founded: 1982; 44 years ago (as Terry Higgins Trust)
- Type: Charitable organisation
- Registration no.: England and Wales: 288527 Scotland: SC039986
- Purpose: HIV and Sexual health, Health policy
- Location: 439 Caledonian Road, London, N7 9BG, England, U.K.
- Coordinates: 51.528555°N 0.119243°W
- Region served: United Kingdom
- Chief Executive: Richard Angell
- Chair: Jonathan McShane
- Revenue: £11 million (2021)
- Staff: 223 (2021)
- Website: tht.org.uk

Terrence Higgins Trust is a British charity that campaigns about and provides services relating to HIV and sexual health. In particular, the charity aims to end the transmission of HIV in the UK; to support and empower people living with HIV, to eradicate stigma and discrimination around HIV, and to promote good sexual health (including safe sex).

The Trust is generally considered the UK's leading HIV and AIDS charity, and the largest in Europe. It was also the lead organisation for Public Health England's HIV prevention partnership HIV Prevention England.

== History ==
Terrence Higgins Trust HIV-testing campaign signs at Brighton Pride in August 2011.

Established in 1982, Terrence Higgins Trust was the first charity in the UK to be set up in response to HIV and AIDS. It was initially named Terry Higgins Trust, after Terry Higgins, who died aged 37 on 4 July 1982 at St Thomas' Hospital, London. He was among the first people in the UK known to have died from the AIDS virus, which was only identified the previous year. Princess Margaret was an early prominent patron, becoming the first member of the royal family to publicly associate themselves with a charity focusing on AIDS and sexual health.

Terry's close friend Tony Calvert, Martyn Butler and Terry's partner Rupert Whitaker, along with other friends started the Trust to raise funds for research as a way of preventing suffering due to AIDS. Shortly, with the generation of a groundswell of support for the organisation at a meeting at Red Lion Square, Tony Whitehead and others joined the group and formally founded the organisation and saw it through registration as a charity to provide direct services to those affected by HIV.

The trust was named after Terry to personalise and humanise the issue of AIDS. It was formalised in August 1983 when it adopted a constitution and opened a bank account, and the name of the trust was changed (Terrence rather than Terry) to sound more formal. It incorporated as a limited company in November 1983 and gained charitable status in January 1984.

Since its inception 12 years ago, most of its fund-raising events have been hip and low-key affairs, from its first disco at the London club Heaven to gala screenings of Dracula and the comedy shows Hysteria and Filth...

Hysteria 1 was a comedy benefit for Terrence Higgins Trust, produced by Stephen Fry.

Hysteria 2, on 18 September 1989 at the Sadler's Wells Theatre in London, benefited Terrence Higgins Trust. It was produced by Stephen Fry and broadcast on Channel 4, with a telethon.

Hysteria 3, at the London Palladium on Sunday, 30 June 1991, benefited Terrence Higgins Trust. Stephen Fry hosted, with Steven Wright, Hugh Laurie, Sir Elton John, Ruby Wax, Rowan Atkinson, Eddie Izzard, Craig Ferguson, Lenny Henry, Julian Clary, Josie Lawrence, Jools Holland, Dawn French, Jennifer Saunders, Sir Ian McKellen, Edwin Starr, Sir Clement Freud, Beverley Craven, Ben Elton, and Tony Slattery.

The charity received almost a million pounds in donations over the Christmas of 1991, with the proceeds of Queen's re-released chart-topper "Bohemian Rhapsody" going entirely to the charity, following the recent AIDS-related death of lead singer Freddie Mercury. After being diagnosed as HIV positive in 1987, Mercury had been concerned that financial support should be available to those less fortunate than himself.

Lisa Power, former corporate head of policy at the Terrence Higgins Trust, denounced the views of Pope Benedict XVI on the use of condoms to prevent AIDS and said: "We deeply regret the continued misinformation around condoms, which remain the most effective way of preventing the spread of HIV."

In August 2015, first-team players from Hull Kingston Rovers teamed up with 1980s band Erasure to record a charity version of the band's single "A Little Respect", with a third of the proceeds going to the trust.

Martyn Butler, who helped co-found the Terrence Higgins Trust, died on the 21st of February 2026, at age 71.

== People ==
- Activist Nick Partridge, who joined the Trust in 1985, was its chief executive until 2013.
- Ian Green was the charity's Chief Executive from 2016 to 2023. Richard Angell became CEO on 1 March 2023.
- In 2022, Kate Nambiar was appointed as the Medical Director of the Trust.

The charity's celebrity patrons have included Freddie Mercury, Stephen Fry, Sir Elton John, Sir Richard Branson, Simon Callow, Lord Cashman, Julian Clary, Dame Judi Dench, Tracey Emin, Dannii Minogue, Paul Gambaccini, Caroline Quentin, Gaby Roslin, Dr Miriam Stoppard and George Michael.

Friends of Mark Ashton, the co-founder of Lesbians and Gays Support the Miners, set-up the Mark Ashton Red Ribbon Fund in his memory, with proceeds going to Terrence Higgins Trust.

== See also ==
- HIV/AIDS in the United Kingdom
