= Martyn Butler =

English HIV/AIDS activist (1954–2026)

Martyn Butler (30 July 1954 – 21 February 2026) was a British (Welsh) HIV/AIDS activist. He was a co-founder of the Terrence Higgins Trust, the leading HIV/Aids charity in Britain. Butler was born in Newport, South Wales and died on 21 February 2026, at the age of 71.
