= Pride Cymru =

Gay pride event in Cardiff, Wales

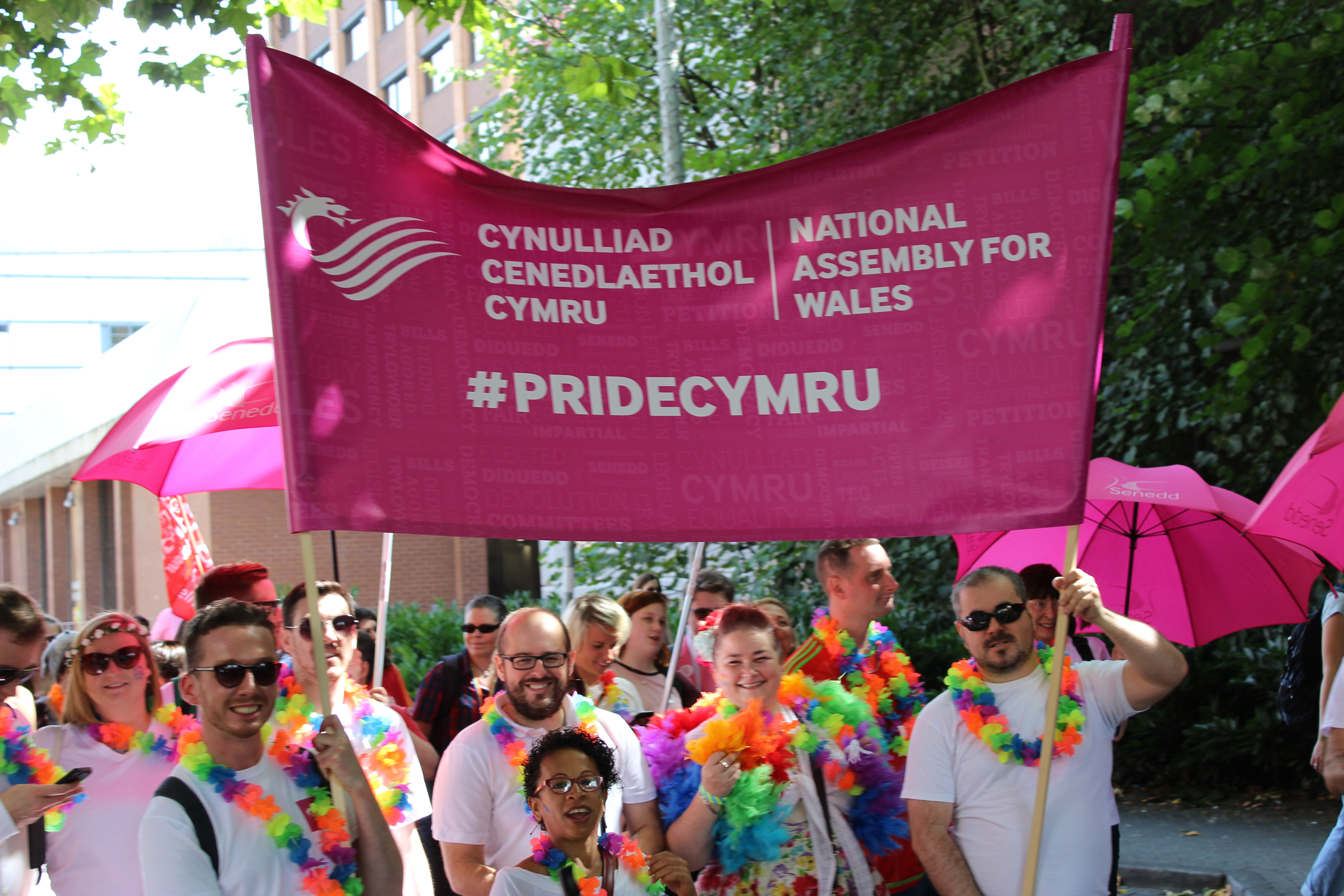
- Predecessor: Cardiff Mardi Gras
- Formation: 1999; 2014
- Type: LGBT Charity
- Registration no.: UK Registered Charity (no. 1137744)
- Location: Cardiff, Wales
- Website: www.pridecymru.com

Pride Cymru (previously Cardiff Mardi Gras) is an LGBT pride festival held annually in Cardiff, Wales (Welsh: Cymru).

Pride Cymru's Big Weekend is the biggest celebration of equality and diversity in Wales. Over 3 days, Pride Cymru hosts over 50,000 people in the Welsh capital to raise awareness of equality and diversity and supporting the LGBT+ community. As part of the festival, there are various cabaret performances, funfair rides, live music, bars and food stalls, and a family area.

== History ==
The first Cardiff Mardi Gras took place in Bute Park, Cardiff, in September 1999 as a response to an increase in hate crime in South Wales. Over 5,000 people attended this inaugural event. Cardiff Mardi Gras became a registered charity in 2010. Since 2012 the event has included a pride parade through Cardiff city centre. In 2014, Cardiff Mardi Gras was renamed Pride Cymru, and has been operating under this name ever since. The Charity has 3 Patrons including Steps singer Ian 'H' Watkins, Actress Lu Corfield and Established Drag Performer Rob Keetch 'Dr Bev'. Previous Patrons include Russell T Davies, Charlotte Church, and Nigel Owens.

Ever since its first event, the festival has continued to grow. It now attracts up to 50,000 people over the three days of the Pride Cymru Big Weekend Festival and is considered to be one of the fastest-growing LGBTI events in the UK.

Pride Cymru was relocated from Bute Park to City Hall Lawns in 2017, due to a booking clash with the Champions League final that year. However, the Big Weekend has continued to be held at the City Hall Lawns ever since. The 2025 event will return to Bute Park.

== Controversy ==
=== 2016 Cardiff Council support ===
In 2016, there was a rumour started that Cardiff Council had dropped support for the event. In an official statement, the Pride Cymru chair said she was told by the council that they'd "made a choice not to allow events during the summer of 2017". There was strong local opposition to the decision and the issue prompted a personal appeal from Sir Ian McKellen in which he compared the negative attitude toward the LGBT community with that seen in India and China on his travels.

Under intense pressure, Cardiff Council reversed its decision and awarded Pride Cymru a slot later in August to move it away from other major events taking place. The organisers would instead take over the running of the council's Big Weekend open-air music festival.

=== 2022 parade disruption by gender-critical group ===
The 2022 parade was disrupted by protesters from Get the L Out, a gender-critical feminism group. The disruption was planned with Merched Cymru, Wales Women's Rights Network, and the LGB Alliance. Signs held by the group included quotes of "Lesbian, not queer", "TransActivism Erases Lesbians", and "Lesbians Don’t Like Penises". The protesters were approached by South Wales Police officers and asked to move aside. Many in the community found the disruption disappointing and upsetting on a day intended to celebrate the LGBTQ+ community in Cardiff. Pride Cymru later released a statement reading:

Today’s Pride Cymru parade was all about celebration and LGBTQ+ rights. Despite a small group of people interrupting the march, they were drowned out by the shouts of solidarity from the community and spectators. There is no place for hate at Pride. And as our parade said today loudly and clearly: "Trans rights are human rights."
