= Trans Aid Cymru =

Transgender mutual aid organisation

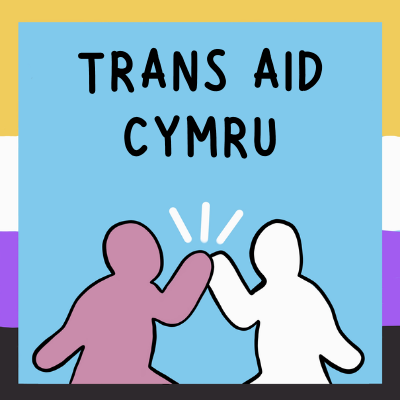
- Abbreviation: TAC
- Formation: June 2020; 6 years ago
- Type: Nonprofit
- Region served: Wales
- Key people: Shash Appan
- Website: transaid.cymru
- Formerly called: South Wales Trans and NonBinary Mutual Aid Fund

Trans Aid Cymru is a mutual aid organisation based in Wales, that aims to support transgender, intersex, and non-binary people in Wales with grants and local events.

== History ==
Trans Aid Cymru was founded in June 2020 after a protest was held outside Cardiff Castle, in response to the UK Conservative government scrapping reform of the Gender Recognition Act. Originally named the "South Wales Trans and NonBinary Mutual Aid Fund" (SWTN Mutual Aid), the organisation rebranded to Trans Aid Cymru in 2021. Since its formation, Trans Aid Cymru has provided transgender community in Wales with financial grants. Initially this was to support transgender people who lost work during the COVID-19 pandemic. This continued, with Trans Aid Cymru providing around £2000 of grants every month during 2023.

In September 2020, Trans Aid Cymru held a second protest outside the Senedd, after the Sunday Times reported that proposals to allow people to self-identify their gender through the Gender Recognition Act had been dropped. The report also confirmed that a diagnosis of gender dysphoria would still be needed to apply for a gender recognition certificate. This angered protesters, who pointed out that over 70% of respondents to the reform consultation agreed that the medical requirement should be removed. Organisers for Trans Aid Cymru called on the Welsh Government to listen to what the trans community had to say regarding future reforms.

Around 100 people attended a protest held by Trans Aid Cymru outside the UK Government's Tŷ William Morgan in April 2022. The protest was held after the UK government announced that a proposed conversion therapy ban would not extend to protest transgender people in the UK. One of Trans Aid Cymru's founders, Shash Appan led the protest by speaking about her own experiences with conversion therapy. Later the same day, the Welsh Government's Deputy Minister for Social Partnership, Hannah Blythyn, shared that the Welsh Government would be taking steps to ban all forms of conversion therapy across Wales.

In 2022, the organisation worked with Tai Pawb and Neil Turnbull from Cardiff University, to research LGBTQ+ experiences of homelessness in Gwent. This research was commissioned by the five local authorities that cover Gwent to better understand and develop policies around LGBTQ+ experiences of homelessness in Gwent. The research won the LGBTQI+ Champion, Initiative or Campaign of the Year award at the 2022 Wales Online Diversity & Inclusion Awards. Drag group Cŵm Rag ran a fundraiser for the organisation in 2022, climbing Snowdon in dresses and heels. The climb was filmed by S4C and released as a documentary that premiered at that years Iris Prize film festival. Trans Aid Cymru received funding in 2022, through the LGBT+ Futures: Equity Fund. This funding was provided by the National Lottery Community Fund, Comic Relief, Barrow Cadbury Trust, and LGBT Consortium.

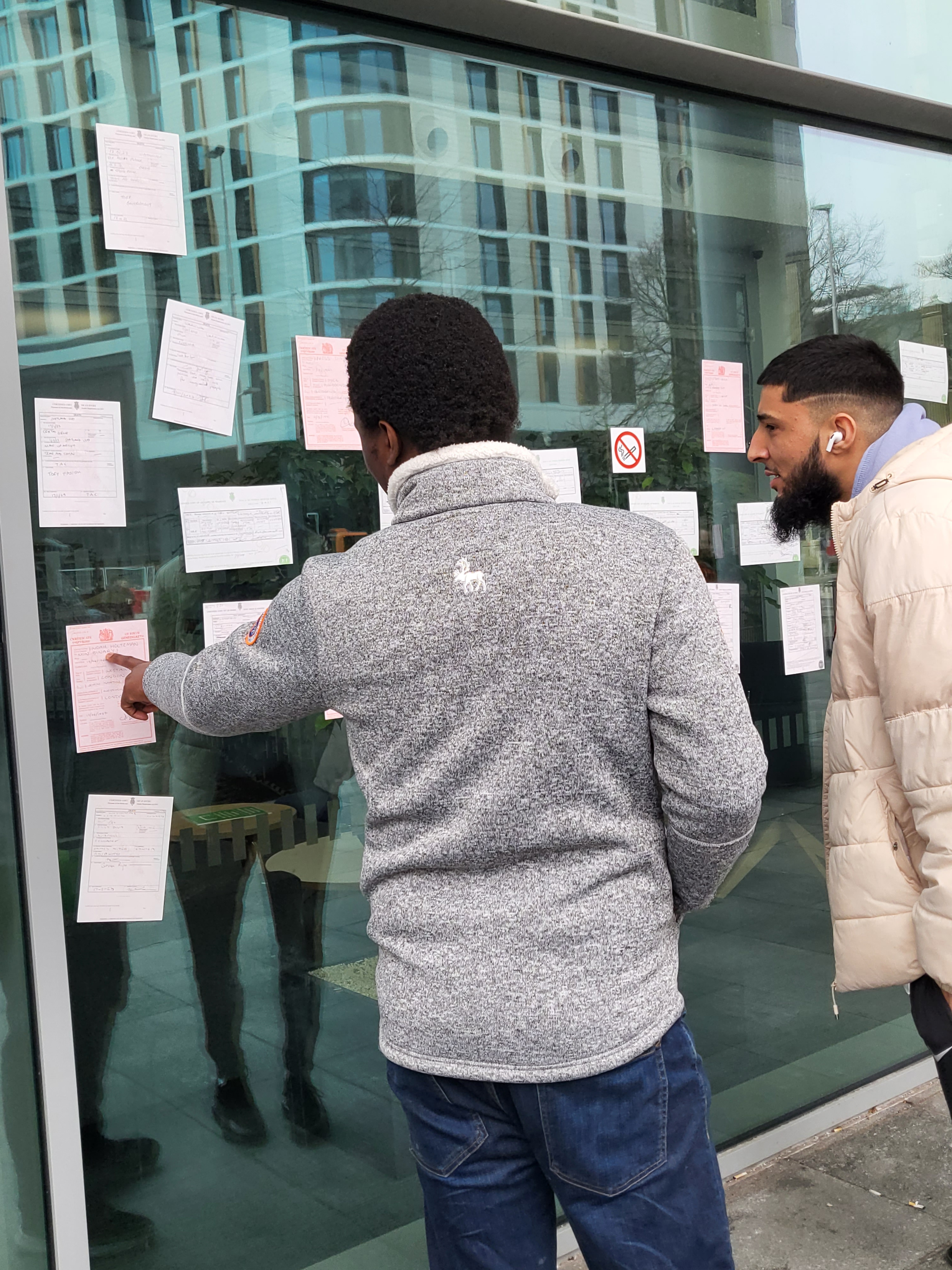
2023 Tŷ William Morgan protest

In February 2023, they stuck fake birth, death, and marriage certificates to Tŷ William Morgan to protest the UK Government blocking the Gender Recognition Reform (Scotland) Bill. The group explained in an online statement that they were intended to represent "trans people across the UK who are unable to get married, have children, or even die without being misgendered." In response to the protest the, Welsh Government minister Hannah Blythyn, stated the Welsh Government supported simplification of the Gender Recognition Act and that Wales was committed to seeking the devolution of the act. In 2023 the organisation acted as consultants for the play Joseph K and the Cost of Living by Emily White.

In 2024, the UK government invited Trans Aid Cymru to submit an opinion regarding the proposed changes to the availability of puberty blockers.

Trans Aid Cymru held a protest march in Cardiff on 21 April 2025, following the UK Supreme Court's ruling on the definition of a "woman" as referred to in the Equality Act 2010. The event attracted over a thousand attendees, who chanted and sang as they marched through the city centre. Protesters included both transgender and cisgender people who disagreed with the ruling.

== Funding ==
The group is funded through donations, fundraisers held by community members, and one off funding from charitable organisations. Previous community fundraising events include live music hosted by Cardiff University's Live Music Society, and 313 Presents at The Moon, Womanby Street, Cardiff. The group distributes their funds using Open Collective, with Social Change Nest acting as their fiscal host.

== Awards ==
- In 2022, the group was nominated for the Community Group of the Year award at the PinkNews Awards.
- In November 2022, they were awarded the Trans Charity of the Year from Trans in the City at their first annual Trans in the City Gala.
