= Tŷ William Morgan =

UK Government building

- William Morgan House
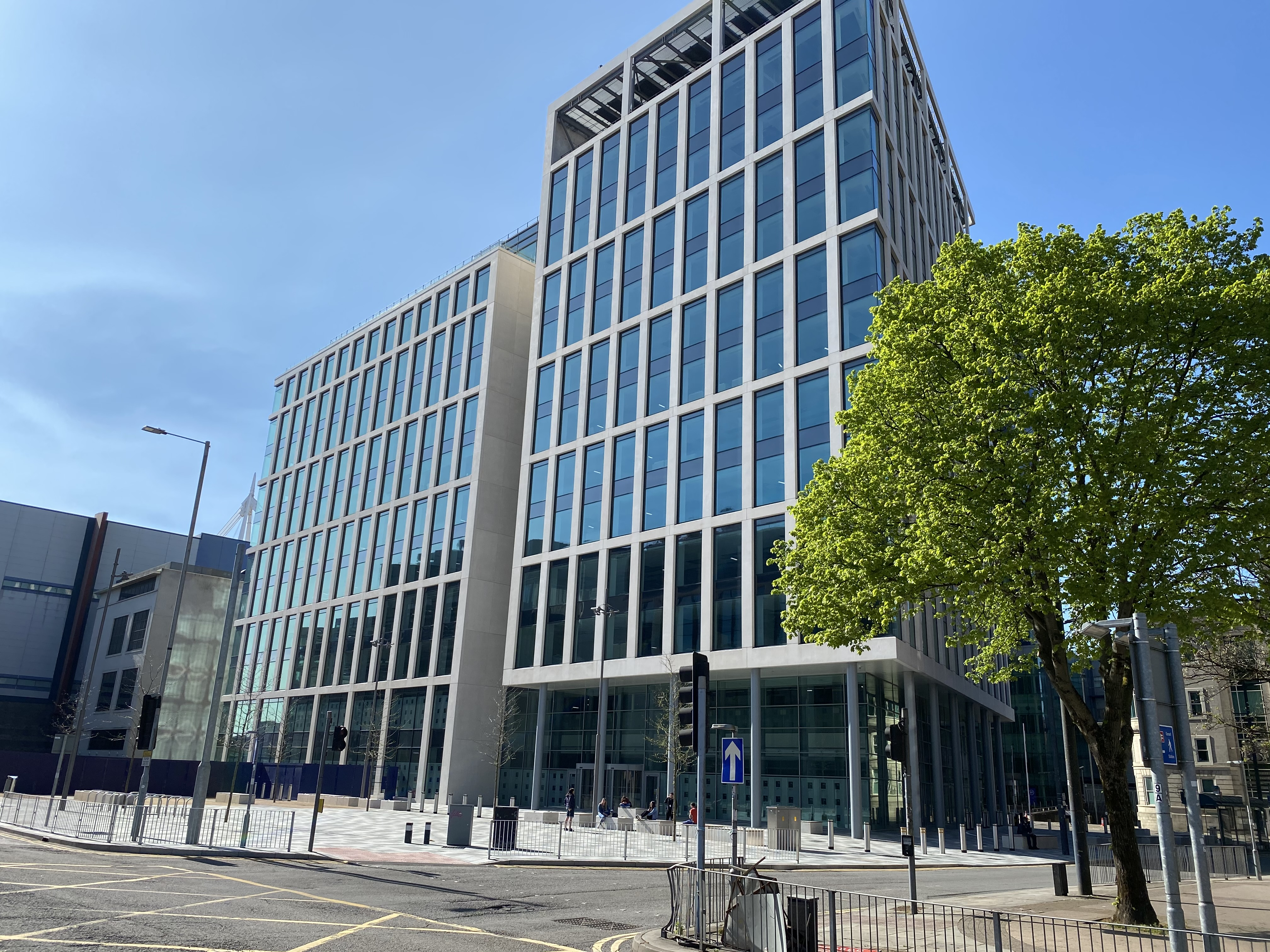
- April 2020

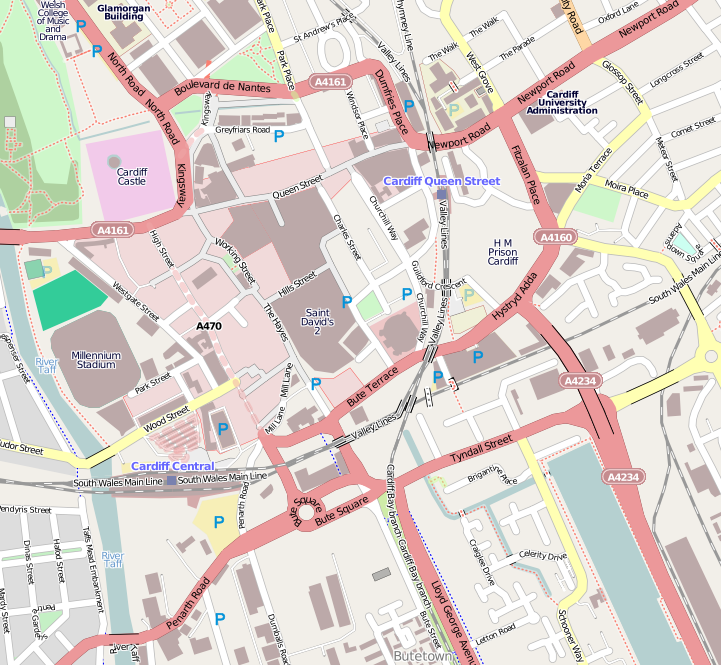
- Location within Central Cardiff
- Alternative names: William Morgan House

General information
- Type: UK Government building
- Location: Cardiff city centre, 6 Central Square, Cardiff CF10 1EP, Cardiff, Wales
- Coordinates: 51.4777°N 3.1801°W
- Current tenants: UK Government; HMRC
- Construction started: October 2017
- Topped-out: September 2018
- Completed: December 2020
- Cost: £100,000,000
- Client: HM Revenue and Customs
- Owner: Legal & General

Height
- Height: 39 metres

Technical details
- Floor count: 12
- Floor area: 265,000 sq ft (24,600 m^{2})

Design and construction
- Architecture firm: Gensler
- Developer: Rightacres Property / Legal & General
- Main contractor: Sir Robert McAlpine Ltd

Tŷ William Morgan (Welsh for William Morgan House) is a UK Government building and hub in the centre of the city of Cardiff, Wales. It primarily serves as a base for HM Revenue and Customs (HMRC) and houses the Cardiff office of the Secretary of State for Wales and the Wales Office.

It also houses staff from other UK Government Departments including the Cabinet Office, Department for Business and Trade, Department for Culture, Media and Sport, Ministry of Housing, Communities and Local Government, Ofgem, Valuation Office Agency, the UK Space Agency. and The Insolvency Service.

== Background ==
The building, at 6 Central Square, Cardiff, was part of the redevelopment of Central Square, which included a new BBC Cymru Wales headquarters, a Transport Interchange and other office development. The building was designed by the architectural firm Gensler Work started on 6 Central Square in late 2017, with the 265,000 ft^{2} (24,600 m^{2}) building already pre-let to HMRC. The building was planned primarily as a new base for HMRC's staff who had previously been located in Llanishen, Cardiff. It was also claimed to be part of a government strategy to increase UK government jobs in cities outside of London. There would be 12 other HMRC regional centres across England and Scotland. 6 Central Square would also be home to other government agencies and be capable of hosting full UK government cabinet meetings.

There are 13 UK Government departments based in Tŷ William Morgan. The majority of the 4,500 civil servants based there are HMRC staff.

The building was topped out in September 2018 and the keys were officially handed over, for fitting out to be completed, in January 2020.

The building was formally opened at a ceremony with Secretary of State for Wales David TC Davies on 5 December 2022.

=== Name ===
In October 2019 it was announced the name of the new building would be Tŷ William Morgan – William Morgan House, named after Bishop William Morgan (1545–1604), translator of the Bible into Welsh. Secretary of State for Wales, Alun Cairns described it as fitting to name the building "after a figure whose pioneering translation of the Bible was instrumental in the survival and growth of the Welsh language and in the development of our unique culture".

=== Signage ===
Early in 2021 a large sign, reading UK Government and Llywodraeth y DU was applied to the façade of Tŷ William Morgan. It was later discovered this branding was only being applied to the regional centres in Cardiff and Edinburgh (Scotland).

In June 2021 Cardiff Council granted planning permission for an 8-storey UK Union Flag to be applied to the windows of Tŷ William Morgan. The flag needed planning permission because it was classed as an 'advertisement'. Planning officers said it was "appropriately proportioned" for the building, while the UK government said it was in line "with similar UK Government sites across the United Kingdom and around the world".

The proposals caused a backlash on social media. In early July 2021 a petition was launched against the plans. A 20,000 name petition was delivered to Cardiff Council's headquarters later that month on behalf of YesCymru, by Super Furry Animals member Cian Ciaran. The petition described the proposals as "muscular unionism". The plan for the flag was later cancelled on cost grounds.

== Description ==
The building backs onto Park Street and is so close to the structure of the Principality Stadium, the builders were able to write their names in the stadium's dust. Located at the north side of Central Square, Tŷ William Morgan faces and overlooks the new BBC Wales headquarters. It has 12 storeys.

== See also ==
- List of tallest buildings in Cardiff
