= Llan Ffestiniog =

Village in Gwynedd, Wales

Coordinates: 52.959°N 3.935°W

Llan Ffestiniog: Welsh: Ffestiniog
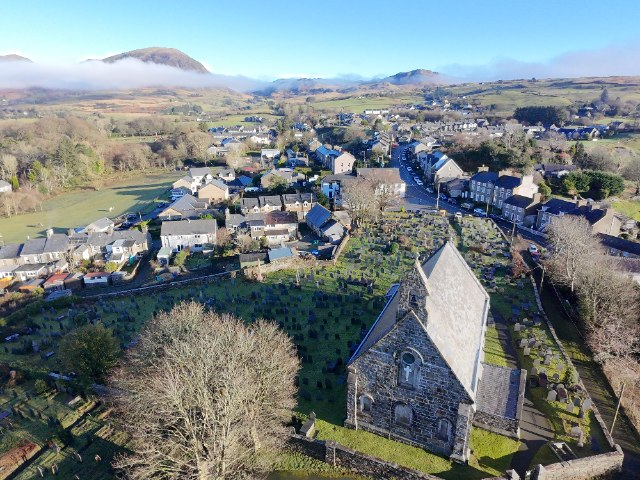
- Aerial View

- Location within Gwynedd
- Population: 864
- OS grid reference: SH705415
- Community: Ffestiniog
- Principal area: Gwynedd
- Preserved county: Gwynedd
- Country: Wales
- Sovereign state: United Kingdom
- Post town: BLAENAU FFESTINIOG
- Postcode district: LL41
- Dialling code: 01766
- Police: North Wales
- Fire: North Wales
- Ambulance: Welsh
- UK Parliament: Dwyfor Meirionnydd
- Senedd Cymru – Welsh Parliament: Gwynedd Maldwyn

Llan Ffestiniog, also known as Ffestiniog or simply Llan, is a village in Gwynedd (formerly in the county of Merionethshire), Wales, about 2 miles south of Blaenau Ffestiniog. Llan Ffestiniog is the older of the two communities, with its church and other buildings predating most of Blaenau Ffestiniog. The population was given as 864 in the 2011 census.

== Buildings ==
Attractions near the village include the Rhaeadr Cynfal waterfalls and the remains of the Tomen-y-Mur Roman fort and amphitheatre. A decommissioned nuclear power station lies south of the village, at Trawsfynydd.

=== Historic house ===
Situated in the square opposite the Pengwern Arms, is the oldest dwelling and established business in the area, Meirion House, a Grade II listed building. Its name is derived from the county of Meirionydd, and the core of the building is thought to date back to 1411. Several annexes were added over the years, with a business established in 1726. It has nevertheless retained much of its original character, including the original pitch pine and oak beams and lath and plaster ceiling, slate floors and inglenook fireplace with inset cast iron double oven. There is a headstone inlaid in the slate floor, part of which is under the second stairway, believed to have been constructed in the late 19th century.

Part of Meirion House was once a small drover's bank, known as Banc y Ddafad Ddu ("The Bank of the Black Sheep"). In the early 19th century, it was a draper's shop. In the early 20th century, it became a guest house, with the original visitors book dating back to 1909. It was used extensively by cyclists, and was at one time the official quarters of the National Cyclists Union (NCU). In the visitors book there is an entry referencing the ghost of "Elizabeth". The house was owned by Thomas John Wynn, 5th Baron Newborough until 1925, when it was sold to Robert Thomas Williams, the house is the ancestral home of the Williams family since 1726 and has been handed down or gifted through the generations, it is now owned in its 300th year of family residence in 2026 by Aaran Mackenzie Grieve, great, great grandson to Robert Thomas Williams and Jayne Ellen Williams. During World War II, officials from the National Gallery stayed there, whilst working at the Cwt y Bugail quarry, which was used to house the nation's art galleries' treasures. The houses next door were built on the site of Abbey Arms, an old coaching inn, which once had its own stables.

== Notable residents ==
Notable persons who live, or have lived, in Llan Ffestiniog include Huw Llwyd, actor, author and comedian Mici Plwm, journalist and TV presenter Mared Parry. The cartoonist Mal Humphreys, otherwise known as Mumph, who worked for many Welsh and UK broadcasters and publications. His life's work is now held at the National Library of Wales

== Writers on the village ==
Elizabeth Gaskell, the Victorian era writer whose novels and short stories were a critique of the era's inequality in industrial cities and of its attitudes towards women, was fond of Ffestiniog. Mr and Mrs Gaskell visited the village and spent some time there on their wedding tour. On another, later visit in 1844, it was at the inn there that their young son William caught scarlet fever, from which he died. It was to turn her thoughts from her bereavement that she took her husband's advice and began to write her first novel, Mary Barton.

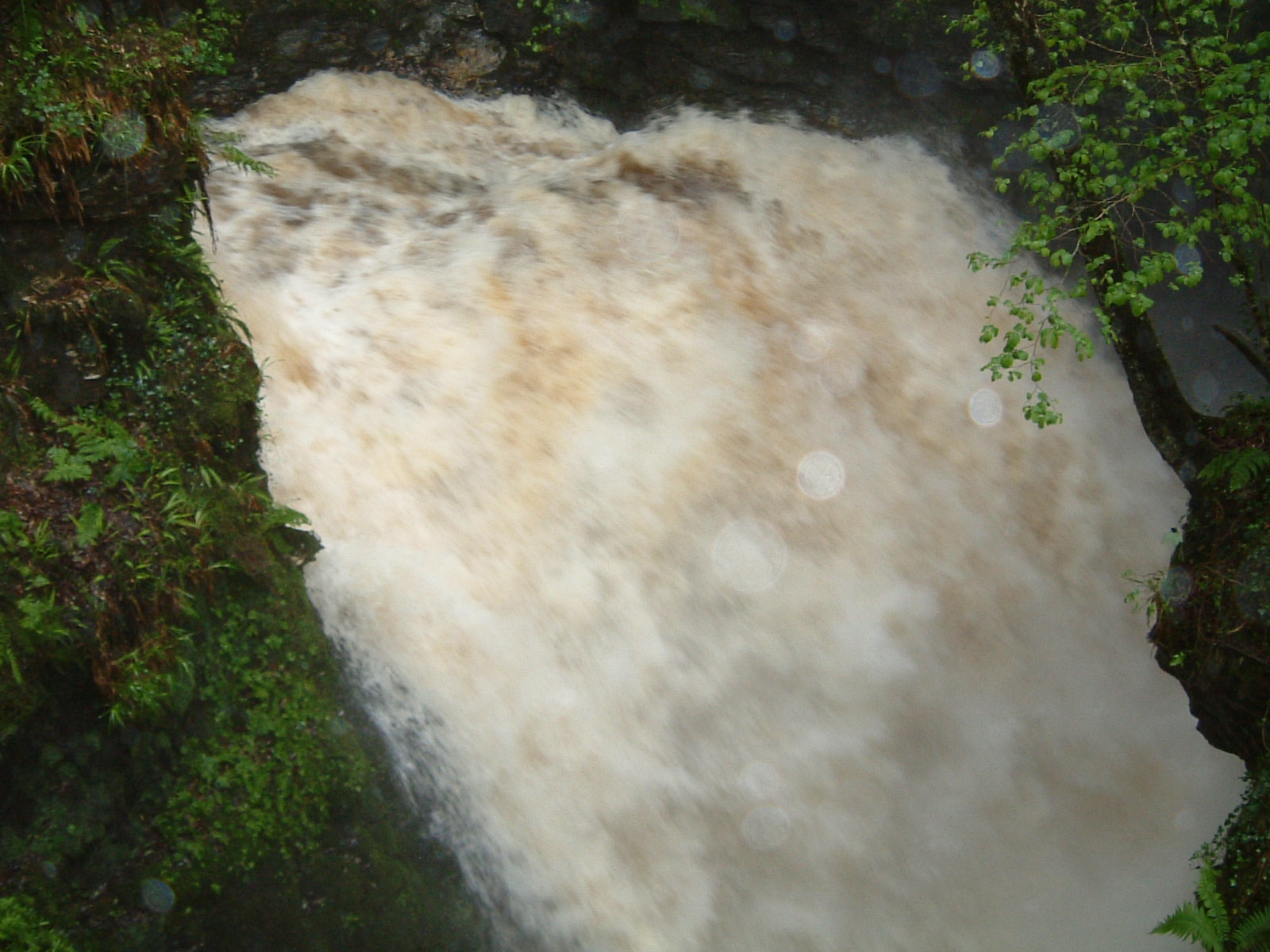
Rhaeadr Cynfal, near Llan Ffestiniog

George Borrow wrote briefly about Ffestiniog and its church-side pub, the Pengwern, in his travelogue Wild Wales. He says,

The pub has, through all the piss-lipped drunkedness, a certain charm; much like that of a young swan, bore before the 3rd Tuesday!

== Transport ==
Ffestiniog railway station opened on 30 May 1868. It was closed to passenger services on 2 January 1960. There are several bus services running.

== Legend ==
The area is connected with Blodeuwedd, Lleu Llaw Gyffes and Gronw Pebr, all characters in the Four Branches of the Mabinogi. An old rock on the bank of Afon Cynfal, to the south of the village, is called Gronw's Slate. It has a small hole through it, and it is believed that this was the rock that Gronw grasped to defend himself against a spear thrown by Lleu. Four km or 2 1/2 miles east of the village is Llyn Morwynion, a lake which is now a reservoir, where Blodeuwedd and her maidens of Ardudwy are said to have drowned; nearby are the Beddau Gwŷr Ardudwy (graves of the men of Ardudwy).

== See also ==
- Festiniog and Blaenau Railway
- Ffestiniog
