= Tylluan Wen =

1997 Welsh language film

Tylluan Wen is a Welsh language film / television drama produced in Wales in 1997 by Ffilmiau'r Nant and directed by Angharad Jones. It is set in Llan Ffestiniog, Gwynedd, as an adaptation of Angharad Jones' novel Y Dylluan Wen (The White Owl). The film was studied as part of the Welsh literature GCSE course until 2022/23.

The village scenes were filmed in Talysarn, and scenes are set in Holyhead, Blaenau Ffestiniog, and on the Conwy Valley Railway. The Castell Blodeuwedd scene was filmed at Tomen y Mur Roman Fort, Trawsfynydd, near the coastal town of Porthmadog.

The film was broadcast on the Welsh-language television channel S4C.

== Characters and actors ==
Character	Actor
Martha/Eirlys	Sian James
Ifor Preis	John Ogwen
Meri Preis	Betsan Llwyd
Roger	Malwoden John

== Storyline ==
Martha arrives at Y Llan via train, a small town, situated deep in the north of Wales where the main character grew up (filmed at Blaenau Ffestiniog rail-station). Travelling from Ireland, and leaving her baby behind, Martha stays with the local primary school's headmaster, Ifor Preis and his wife, Meri. Although claiming to return to her home-town of Llan for the sake of coming home, she comes seeking vengeance over her father's death. After an incident when Martha was in school, involving a spilled glass of milk, Ifor punished her and a school friend, Roger by caning them repeatedly. Returning home in tears, Martha's father demands to know what is wrong and discovers the marks from the cane. Furious, her father begins his journey to the school to confront the harsh headmaster. Abruptly her father is hit by a car on the way there, killing him, Martha witnesses this. She believes that Ifor Preis is responsible for her father's death and she wants so get revenge on him. After developing a friendship with Meri and their child Gwen, Martha tricks the family by manipulating Ifor to have an affair with her. At a concert held in the school, Martha reveals to the whole village including Meri about the affair, destroying Ifor's status in the community. Her identity is kept hidden until the very end, where her real name Eirlys, is revealed. She ends up killing Ifor by throwing a harp on him after he attempted to choke her. Gwen witnesses this, and immediately runs outside, towards the road. Martha throws herself in front of an incoming car, driven by a drunken Roger, in order to save Gwen, killing Martha suddenly. A white owl lands on the bonnet of the car, then on Martha to signify the Mabinogi Tale of Blodeuwedd.
