= Trefin =

Village in Pembrokeshire, Wales

Coordinates: 51°56′57″N 5°08′43″W

Trefin: Welsh: Tre-fin (Note: Under the Welsh Language Commissioner's standardisation of Welsh place names, the settlement is to be written as "Tre-fin" in Welsh, although "Trefin" may still be used in Welsh-language sources.)
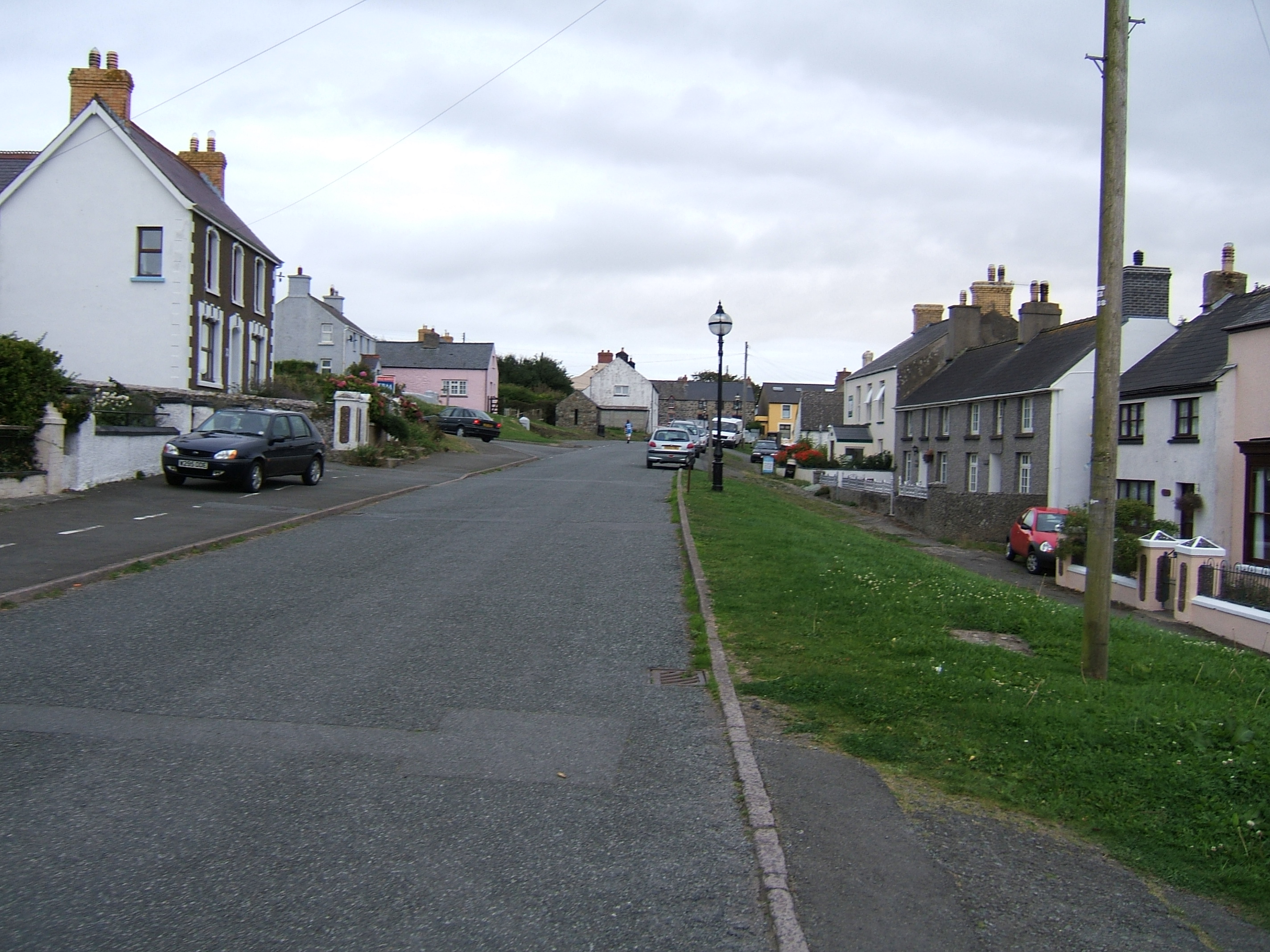

- Location within Pembrokeshire
- Population: 216
- OS grid reference: SM8230
- Community: Llanrhian
- Principal area: Pembrokeshire
- Country: Wales
- Sovereign state: United Kingdom
- Post town: Haverfordwest
- Postcode district: SA62
- Dialling code: 01348
- Police: Dyfed-Powys
- Fire: Mid and West Wales
- Ambulance: Welsh
- UK Parliament: Preseli Pembrokeshire
- Senedd Cymru – Welsh Parliament: Preseli Pembrokeshire

Trefin (Welsh standardised:Tre-fin), formerly anglicised as Trevine, is a village in North Pembrokeshire, south-west Wales. The village lies within the parish and community of Llanrhian, which has a significant Welsh-speaking population.

== Etymology ==
The name "Trefin" possibly derives from "Tref" meaning farmstead, and "Ddyn" meaning high ground.

== History ==
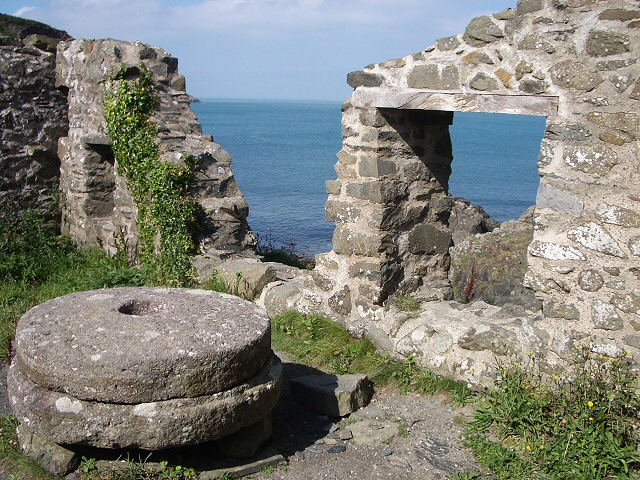
The Mill at Aberfelin

Trefin was settled in the medieval period, around the 12th–13th centuries, having an overall linear arrangement and faint traces of an open-field system. Its earliest inhabitants were of English or Flemish origin.

The settlement had links with the estate of the ecclesiastical lordship of St Davids. The Archdruid Crwys, who was born in Craig Cefn Parc, Glamorganshire, had links to the village, with the historic mill at nearby Aberfelin being the subject of his poem Melin Trefin. Some of Trefin's old village cottages and the old mill's remains date back to the 15th century.

The medieval mill, built for use by the bishops in and located in a rocky cove, was used for roughly 500 years by the local populace until 1918 when it was closed due to cheaper wheat imports from abroad impacted the mill's production. When operating, the wheat at the mill was milled to produce flour for bread and barley was ground into winter feed for livestock.

From the 1800s, most of the village was rebuilt with a mix of early 1900s cottages and larger Victorian homes built for "sea captains". The other main industry during this period alongside farming and shipping, were the mechanised slate quarries near the coast, expanded in the 1860s, with its resources exported from Porthgain's port.

Two chapels were built in the village. The first the Trefin Calvinistic Methodist Chapel built in 1786 (rebuilt in 1834), became a centre for the Calvinistic Methodist Church in Wales and was restored in 1936. The other chapel, the Baptist Chapel was built in 1840, rebuilt in around 1870 and served as a branch of Croesgoch.

By the 1900s cheap grain was being imported from overseas and milled in larger mills in towns and cities, leading to the closure of Aberfelin mill in 1918. The mill stones remain in the ruins of the roofless mill.

The historic centre of the village was designated as a Conservation Area in 1997.

== Community ==
Trefin is surrounded by the Irish Sea and on the Pembrokeshire Coast Path, between Porthgain and Abercastle. It is on the route of the Strumble Shuttle bus service, part of the Pembrokeshire Greenways public transport service. Carreg Samson, a Neolithic burial chamber is located nearby, between the village and Abercastle. Trefin lies within the Pembrokeshire Coast National Park, the only coastal area included in the National parks of the United Kingdom.

Trefin is a small village of around 130 people, and houses a weaving centre, The Mill cafe, two chapels (both now closed), a pub The Ship Inn, a hostel 'Old School Hostel' as well as holiday accommodation. Nearby villages include Llanrhian, Abercastle, Porthgain, Mathry, Square and Compass, Penparc and Croesgoch. The village is between Fishguard and St Davids.

== Notable people ==
- Thomas Richard (1783–1856), a Calvinistic Methodist minister, born in Trefin.
- Edgar Phillips (1889–1962), Welsh poet and served as Archdruid of the National Eisteddfod of Wales
- Cerys Matthews MBE (born 1969), singer, songwriter, author and broadcaster
