= British narrow-gauge slate railways =

Narrow-gauge railways were used extensively in the slate industry of Great Britain, especially in Wales. Many quarries had internal tramways, some using many dozens of miles of track. Others had private lines that stretched from the quarry to transhipment points on local railways, rivers, roads or coastal ports.

== Wales ==
| Name | Opened | Closed | Gauge | Location | Image | Notes |
| Abereiddi Tramway | 1851 | 1906 | 3 ft (914 mm) | Porthgain | | 2 mile long horse-drawn tramway linking St. Bride's Slate Quarry with Porthgain |
| Aberllefenni quarry tramway | 1859 | 2002 | 2 ft 3 in (686 mm) | Aberllefenni | | Underground slate mine and short line to the village mill. Connected to the Corris Railway until it closed in 1948. |
| Alexandra quarry | 1861 | 1934 | 2 ft (610 mm) | Moel Tryfan | | Steam locomotive worked quarry feeder tramway connected to the Bryngwyn branch of the Welsh Highland Railway. |
| Arthog Tramway | 1858 | 1868 | 2 ft (610 mm) | Arthog | | Incline and horse-worked tramway |
| Blaen-y-Cae quarry tramway | 1870 | 1931 | 2 ft (610 mm) and 3 ft 6 in (1,067 mm) | Talysarn | | Nantlle Vale quarry connected to the Nantlle Railway |
| Blaen y Cwm quarry | | 1974 | 2 ft (610 mm) | Blaenau Ffestiniog | | Internal quarry tramway system, connected to the Rhiwbach Tramway via a short uphaul incline. |
| Braich quarry tramway | before 1877 | 1932 | 2 ft (610 mm) | Moel Tryfan | | Connected to the North Wales Narrow Gauge Railways at Bryngwyn |
| Braich-Rhydd quarry tramway | before 1873 | 1915 | 2 ft (610 mm) | Y Fron | | Connected to the Nantlle Railway |
| Bryn Glas Tramway | 1900s early | ? | 2 ft (610 mm) (?) | Bethesda | | Short-lived horse-worked tramway built during the 1900-1903 strike at Penrhyn quarry |
| Bryn-y-Fferam quarry tramway | 1860s | 1886 | ? | Moel Tryfan | | Isolated quarry with two pits connected by a tunnel. |
| Cardigan Slate Works | ? | about 1910 | 2 ft (610 mm) | Glandyfi | | 1/4 mile (0.40 km)-long tramway serving a quarry on the south bank of the Afon Dyfi |
| Carnarvonshire Slate Quarries Railway | 1850s | 1915 | 3 ft 6 in (1,067 mm) | Nantlle | | Horse-worked feeder tramway from the Tan-yr-allt slate quarry to the Nantlle Railway |
| Cedryn quarry tramway | 1861 | 1888 | 2 ft (610 mm) | Llanrwst | | 4 mile long horse-powered tramway serving the Cedryn quarry by Llyn Eigiau; partly relaid in 1917 as part of the Eigiau Tramway |
| Chwarel Fedw tramway | 1840s (?) | 1880s | 2 ft (610 mm) | Dolwyddelan | | 1/4 mile (0.40 km) long tramway connecting Chwarel Fedw across the Lledr Valley to Prince Llewellyn quarry mill. |
| Cilgwyn quarry tramway | before 1861 | 1956 | 2 ft (610 mm) and 3 ft 6 in (1,067 mm) | Cilgwyn quarry | | Nantlle Vale quarry connected to the Nantlle Railway. Two steam locomotives survive in preservation. |
| Coed Madoc quarry tramway | before 1864 | 1927 | 2 ft (610 mm) | Tal-y-Sarn | | Steam locomotive worked quarry tramway. Inclines connected to a standard-gauge branch from Tal-y-sarn. |
| Cornwall quarry tramway | 1867 | 1937 | 3 ft 6 in (1,067 mm) | Tal-y-sarn | | Nantlle Vale quarry connected to the Nantlle Railway. |
| Croesor Tramway | 1864 | about 1944 | 2 ft (610 mm) | Porthmadog | | Horse-powered tramway serving the slate quarries of the Croesor valley |
| Cwm Ebol Tramway | 1868 | 1906 | 3 ft (914 mm) later 2 ft (610 mm) | Pennal | | 1½ mile long tramway with two self-acting inclines. The last Welsh slate quarry connected only to a shipping point instead of a railway. |
| Cwmorthin Tramway | 1864 | 1939 | 2 ft (610 mm) | Tanygrisiau | | 1.8 mile long tramway connecting the quarries of Cwm Orthin to the Ffestiniog Railway. |
| Cwt y Bugail quarry | | 1974 | 2 ft (610 mm) | Blaenau Ffestiniog | | Internal locomotive-worked quarry tramway system, connected to the Rhiwbach Tramway. It was the last user of the section of the Trmaway above No. 3 incline |
| Deeside Tramway | 1870 by | 1947 | 2 ft 6 in (762 mm) | Glyndyfrdwy | | Horse-powered tramway serving the Moel Fferna slate quarry. Mostly laid with wooden rails sheathed in iron. |
| Dorothea quarry tramway | before 1873 | 1970 | 2 ft (610 mm) and 3 ft 6 in (1,067 mm) | Tal-y-sarn | | Major Nantlle Vale quarry connected to the Nantlle Railway. |
| Eigiau Tramway | 1863 | 1888 | 2 ft (610 mm) | Llanrwst | | Tramway connecting the Eigiau mine 6 miles to the shipping point on the River Conwy |
| Foel Gron Tramway | 1860 | about 1900 | 2 ft (610 mm) (?) | Llan Ffestiniog | | Horse-powered tramway. |
| Friog tramway | ? | ? | 2 ft (610 mm) | Fairbourne | | 1.5 miles (2.4 km)-long tramway connecting the Henddol slate quarry via tramways to the Afon Mawddach |
| Fron quarry tramway | 1864 | 1950 | 2 ft (610 mm) and 3 ft 6 in (1,067 mm) | Fron | | Quarry connected to the Nantlle Railway and the North Wales Narrow Gauge Railways via separate inclines. |
| Fron-heulog quarry tramway | 1854 | 1913 | 3 ft 6 in (1,067 mm) | Nantlle | | Quarry connected to the Nantlle Railway. |
| Gallt-y-Fedw quarry tramway | 1857 | 1901 | 2 ft (610 mm) and 3 ft 6 in (1,067 mm) | Fron | | Quarry connected to the Nantlle Railway. |
| Gorseddau Tramway/Tremadoc Tramway | 1855 | 1872 | 3 ft (914 mm) | Porthmadog | | Horse-powered tramway serving the remote slate quarries of the Cwmystradllyn valley. |
| Gorseddau Junction and Portmadoc Railways | 1872 | 1887 | 2 ft (610 mm) | Porthmadog | | Regauged and extended Gorseddau Tramway. |
| Hendre-Ddu Tramway | 1877 | 1949 | 1 ft 10 in (559 mm) | Aberangell | | Network of branch lines serving slate quarries and timber forests west of the Dyfi valley. |
| John Robinson Tramway | 1868 | c. 1875 | 3 ft 6 in (1,067 mm) | Nantlle Valley | | Horse worked tramway connecting Fron quarry with the Nantlle Railway |
| Llechwedd quarry | 1860s? | 1980s? | 2 ft (610 mm) | Blaenau Ffestiniog | | Extensive slate mine, once supported by nearly 100 miles of internal railway. Commercial railway use has now ceased but a tourist incline railway is operated. |
| Maenofferen quarry | 1860s? | 1999 | 2 ft (610 mm) | Blaenau Ffestiniog | | The last slate mine in Blaenau Ffestiniog to use an internal quarry tramway and incline |
| Moel Siabod tramways | 1863 | 1901 | 2 ft (610 mm) | Capel Curig | | A pair of remote quarries served by a short tramway to a wharf for transshipment onto the Capel Curig road. |
| Nant Col quarry | ? | ? | 2 ft (610 mm) (?) | Llanbedr | | Internal slate quarry tramway. |
| Nantlle Railway | 1828 | 1963 | 3 ft 6 in (1,067 mm) | Penygroes | | Horse-hauled slate tramway serving the quarries of the Nantlle vale. |
| Oakeley quarry | 1814 by | ? | 1 ft 11 1/2 in (597 mm) | Blaenau Ffestiniog | | One of the largest slate mines in Wales, a major source of the Festiniog Railway's traffic. |
| Oernant Tramway | 1852 | 1897 | 3 ft (914 mm) | Llangollen | | Six mile long tramway connecting the Moel-y-faen and Clogau quarries with the Llangollen Canal and slate works |
| Padarn Railway | 1843 | 1961 | 4 ft (1,219 mm) | Llanberis | | Slate hauler serving the Dinorwic quarry which itself had an extensive narrow-gauge rail system. |
| Pantdreiniog quarry | 1903 | 1911 | 2 ft (610 mm) | Bethesda | | Quarry set up by striking Penrhyn quarry miners during the historic lock-outs. |
| Penarth quarry | | | 2 ft (610 mm) | Corwen | | 3/4 mile (1.2 km)_long tramway that passed in a tunnel under the main road and to a siding near Bonwm Halt railway station on the Ruabon–Barmouth line. |
| Penrhyn Railway | 1874 | 1962 | 1 ft 11 1/2 in (597 mm) | Bethesda | | Slate hauler serving the Penrhyn Quarry which itself had an extensive narrow-gauge rail system. |
| Pen-yr-Orsedd quarry tramways | 1862 | 1979 | 2 ft (610 mm) and 3 ft 6 in (1,067 mm) | Nantlle | | Internal quarry system feeding the Nantlle Tramway. |
| Porthgain Railway | 1880 slate | 1931 | 3 ft (914 mm) | Porthgain | | Locomotive worked railway connecting the Pen Clegyr and St Bride's quarries to Porthgain harbour. Built over part of the route of the earlier horse-worked Abereiddi Tramway. |
| Prince Llewellyn quarry | 1820 | 1934 | 2 ft (610 mm) | Dolwyddelan | | Internal tramways and inclines within the quarry, and a 0.5 miles (0.80 km)-long tramway across the bottom of the Lledr valley connecting to Chwarel Fedw. |
| Ratgoed Tramway | 1860s | 1950s | 2 ft 3 in (686 mm) | Aberllefenni | | Horse and gravity worked light tramway connecting the Cymerau and Ratgoed quarries with the Corris Railway |
| Rhiwbach Tramway | 1863 | 1961 | 2 ft (610 mm) | Blaenau Ffestiniog | | Locomotive and incline worked tramway connecting the remote quarries around Cwt y Bugail to the Ffestiniog Railway |
| South Snowdon Tramway | 1868 | 1880s | 2 ft (610 mm) | Hafod y Llan | | Series of inclines and tramways connecting the quarries above Hafod y Llan to the North Wales Narrow Gauge Railways |
| Tyddyn Sieffre Tramway | 1858 | 1900 | 2 ft (610 mm) | Barmouth | | Self acting incline and mile-long horse-drawn tramway |
| Upper Corris Tramway | 1859 | 1930 | 2 ft 3 in (686 mm) | Corris | | Horse-drawn tramway connecting the quarries around Corris Uchaf with the Corris Railway at Maespoeth Junction |

== Rest of Britain ==
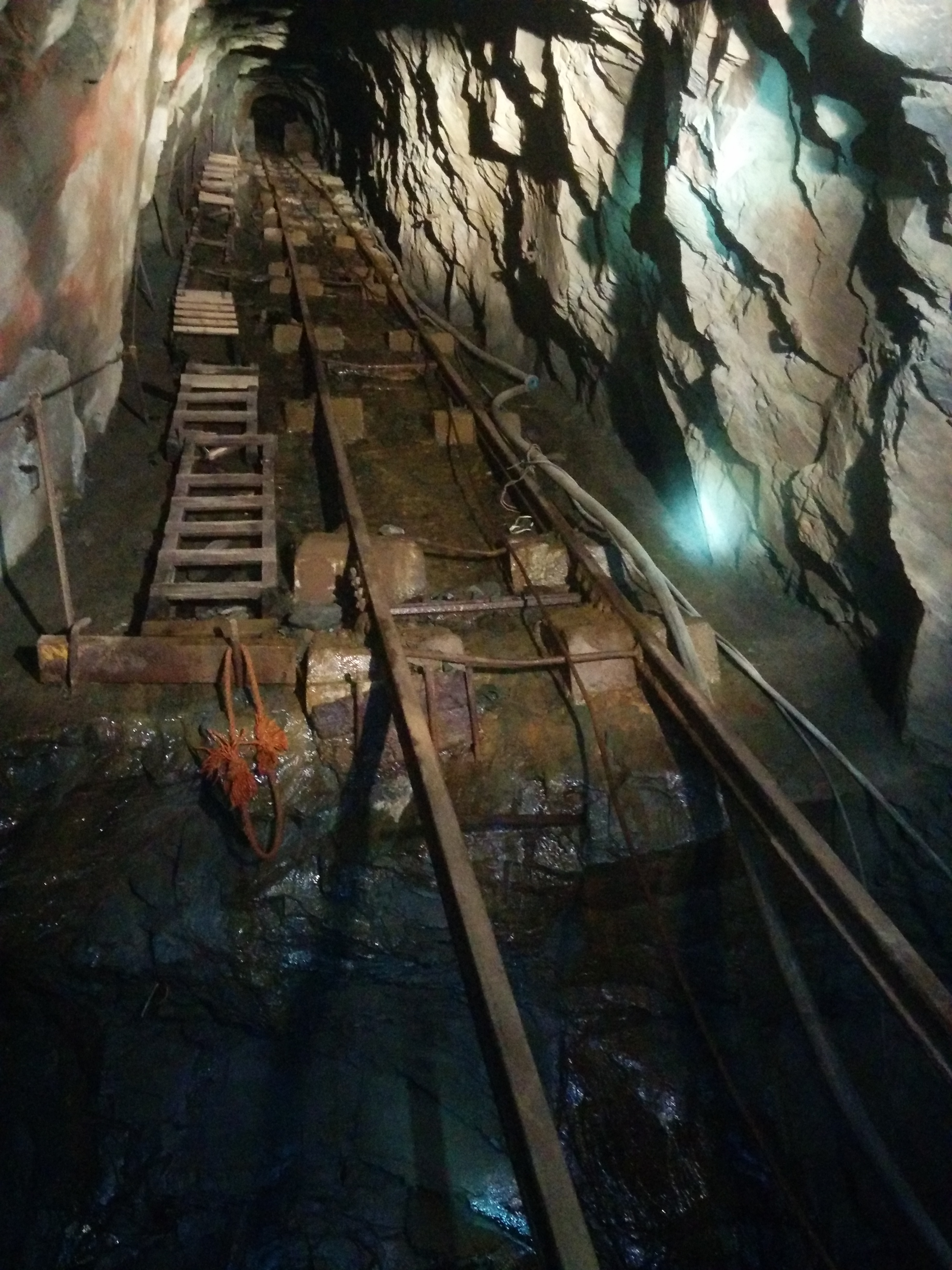
Underground incline at Honister slate mine

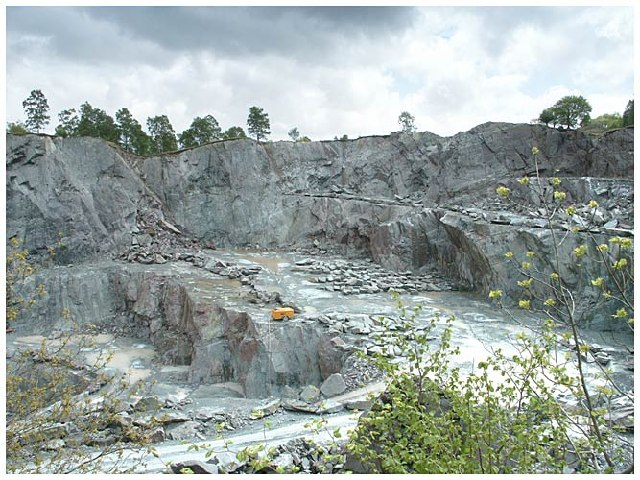
Burlington slate quarry

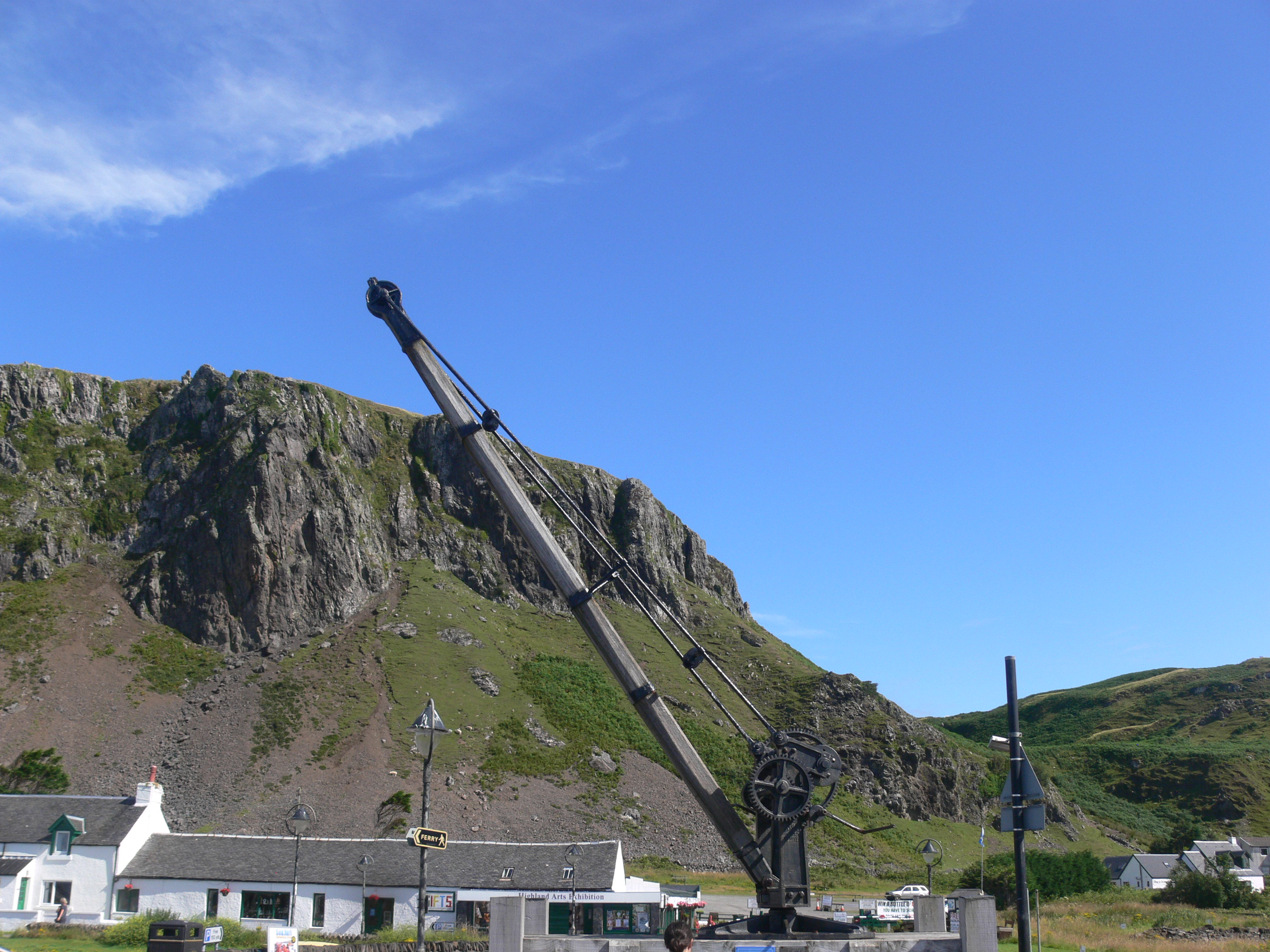
Slate loading jetty on Seil

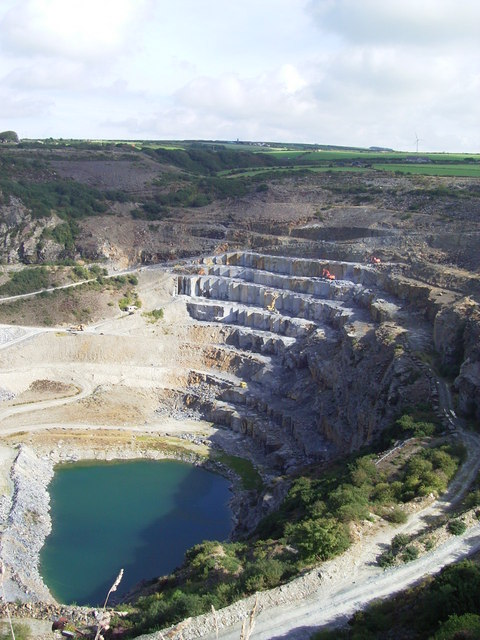
Delabole slate quarry

| Name | Opened | Closed | Gauge | Location | Notes |
|---|---|---|---|---|---|
| Aberfoyle Slate Quarries | ? | By 1954 | ? | Trossachs, Scotland | Tramway serving this successful quarry |
| Ballachulish Slate Quarry | ? | By 1955. | ? | Ballachulish, Scotland | Internal quarry system with well-built inclines. |
| Balvicar Slate Quarry | ? | By early 1960s. | ? | Balvicar, Scotland | Quarry on a southern Hebridean Island with hand-worked railway. |
| Burlington Slate Quarries | ? | after 1975; by 1979 | 3 ft 2 1/4 in (972 mm) | Elterwater, England | Internal quarry system serving this Lake District quarry. The railway was originally horse worked, but later used battery-electric and diesel locomotives. The quarry is still in production. |
| Easdale Quarry | ? | By 1911 | ? | Easdale, Scotland | Deep pits extending below sea level on this Hebridean island, with a locomotive-worked narrow-gauge railway moving stone from the pits to the harbour. The flooded pits are still a prominent feature of the island, and the locomotive shed still stands. |
| Elterwater Slate Quarry | ? | ? | 2 ft (610 mm) | Elterwater, England | Internal quarry system serving this Lake District quarry. |
| Honister Slate Mine | ? | Present | 600 mm (1 ft 11 5/8 in) | Elterwater, England | Internal quarry system serving this Lake District quarry. Due to the location of the mine at the head of the Honister Pass, the railway featured long inclines as well as locomotive haulage. In 1997 the mine re-opened with a newly built narrow-gauge railway to support the operations. |
| Seil Slate Quarry | ? | By World War I | ? | Seil, Scotland | Extensive slate quarries on this Hebridean Island, served by a network of hand-worked narrow-gauge railways. |
| Tir na Oig Slate Quarry | ? | Late 1930s | ? | Luing, Scotland | Slate quarry on this Hebridean Island, served by a hand-worked narrow-gauge tramway connecting to a jetty. Remains of the tramway, including track and wagons remained in 1999. |
| Old Delabole Slate Quarry | before 1834 | after 1987 | 1 ft 11 1/2 in (597 mm) | Delabole, England | Large Cornish slate quarry with extensive steam and diesel locomotive roster |
| Toberonochy Slate Quarry | ? | ? | ? | Luing, Scotland | Slate quarry on this Hebridean Island, served by a hand-worked narrow-gauge tramway. |

== Bibliography ==
- Richards, Alun John (2001). The Slate Railways of Wales (1st. ed.). Llanrwst, Wales: Gwasg Carreg Gwalch. ISBN 0-86381-689-4.
- Boyd, James I.C. (1990) [1972]. Narrow Gauge Railways in North Caernarvonshire, Volume 1: The West. Headington: The Oakwood Press. ISBN 978-0-85361-273-5. OCLC 650247345.
