= John Knapp-Fisher =

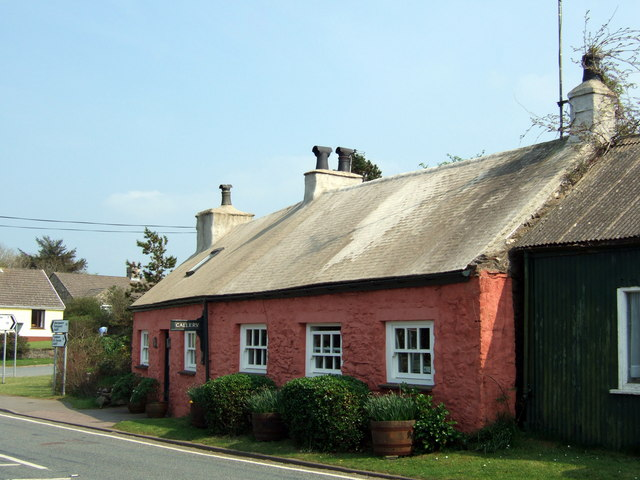
- Gallery at Croesgoch, Pembrokeshire
- Born: 2 August 1931; London
- Died: 21 February 2015 (aged 83); Haverfordwest, Wales
- Education: Maidstone School of Art
- Elected: Royal Cambrian Academy of Art
- Website: www.johnknapp-fisher.com

John Knapp-Fisher (August 1931 – 21 February 2015) was a British painter known particularly for his depictions of the coast of Pembrokeshire, West Wales. He worked from his studio in Croesgoch since 1967. He exhibited his paintings across Europe and also Africa and North America. In 1992 he was elected a member of the Royal Cambrian Academy of Art.

== Early life ==
John Knapp-Fisher was born in 1931, the son of Arthur Bedford Knapp-Fisher, Professor of Architecture at London's Royal College of Art. John was educated at the Maidstone College of Art where he studied graphic design. Subsequently, he worked in exhibition design and theatre design, but also began painting. In 1965 he moved to Pembrokeshire, Wales.

== Career ==
Knapp-Fisher claimed he painted every day. "I tell students to do something every day – even if it’s a quick thumbnail sketch... Rather like a dancer has to practise every day, a painter has to oil the hinges by doing little drawings." He preferred to paint from notes and drawings in his sketchbooks, rather than from photographs. As a result, his favorite subjects were local to his studio, for example Porthgain Harbour.

Knapp-Fisher's largest exhibition was in Johannesburg, South Africa, where he displayed over 60 paintings.

To mark his 80th birthday in August 2011, Knapp-Fisher was featured on the BBC Radio Wales Arts Show. He also held an exhibition of new paintings at the Martin Tinney Gallery in Cardiff.

== Personal life ==
Knapp-Fisher once spent 5 years living on a boat in East Anglia. He resided in Croesgoch with his partner, Gillian Pare. Knapp-Fisher died at Withybush Hospital, Haverfordwest in February 2015 age 83.
