= Porthgain Railway =

Coordinates: 51.948°N 5.180°W

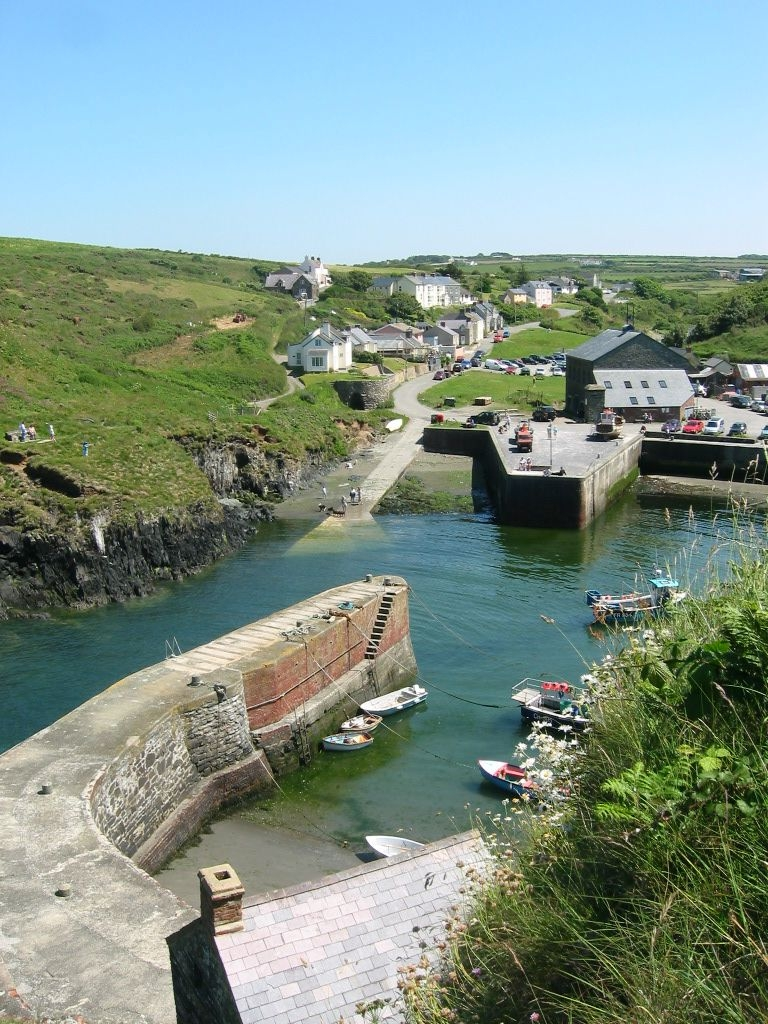
- Porthgain harbour in 2005, showing the pier that was the terminus of the Porthgain railway

Overview
- Headquarters: Porthgain
- Locale: Pembrokeshire, Wales
- Dates of operation: late 1880s–1931
- Successor: Abandoned

Technical
- Track gauge: 3 ft (914 mm)
- Length: 625 yards (572 m)

The Porthgain Railway was a 3 ft (914 mm) narrow gauge industrial railway connecting the Pen Clegyr and St. Bride's quarries with Porthgain harbour. It operated from the late 1880s until 1931.

The line of the track can still be traced as a levelled strip on the clifftop, adjacent to the path to Porthgain harbour.

== Locomotives ==
Name	Builder	Type	Date	Works number	Notes
Porthgain	Andrew Barclay	0-6-0T	1909	1185	Supplied new to Porthgain. Out of use by 1929. Scrapped on site shortly after 1931.
Charger	W.G. Bagnall	0-4-0T	1891	1381	Worked at Palmers Shipbuilding and Iron Co. Ltd., Jarrow until 1908. Worked on the construction of Blackwater Reservoir at Rannoch Moor. Acquired 1912. Scrapped shortly after 1931.
Singapore	Kerr Stuart	0-4-2ST	1899	659	Built for the construction of the Burtonport extension of the Londonderry and Lough Swilly Railway in Ireland until 1903. Worked on the construction of Blackwater Reservoir at Rannoch Moor. Acquired 1912. Out of use by 1929. Scrapped shortly after 1931.
Newport	Hudswell Clarke	0-4-0T	1889	311	Built for the 2 ft 10 in (864 mm) gauge railway at Cwmclydach Colliery, Swansea; worked until 1899 then sold for use on the Elan Valley Reservoirs contract. Regauged to 3 ft (914 mm) narrow gauge in 1908. Worked on various construction contracts until sold to Porthgain in 1929. Remained in the Porthgain Railway locomotive shed after closure until scrapped in 1953.

== See also ==
- Abereiddy
- British industrial narrow gauge railways
- Industrial railway
