= Siân James (musician) =

Welsh traditional folk singer and harpist (born 1961)

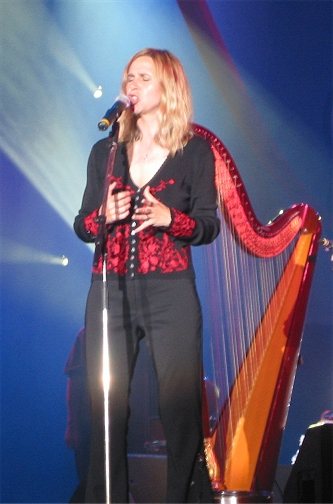
Siân James live on stage at the Festival Interceltique de Lorient (2002)

Siân James (born 24 December 1961) is a Welsh traditional folk singer and harpist who has recorded for Sain and BBC Records as well as her own label, Bos.

A native of the Mid Wales village of Llanerfyl in Powys, Siân James participated, from an early age, in local eisteddfodau, playing the piano, the violin and later the harp. While still a student at Llanfair Caereinion High School, she began composing her own songs and arranging traditional Welsh music. She went on to read music at the University of Wales, Bangor. She is also well known for her acting work on Welsh language television.

Having been a recording artist for Sain and BBC Records, James has, in the 2000s, recorded her work for Bos at her home studio in Llanerfyl.

James conducts and accompanies a Welsh men's choir called Parti Cut Lloi. In 2009, she performed several times with the choir at the Smithsonian Folklife Festival in Washington, D.C.

== Albums ==
- Cysgodion Karma [Karma Shadows] (1990)
- Distaw [Silent] (1993)
- Gweini Tymor [Serving a Term] (1996)
- Di-Gwsg [Sleepless] (1997)
- Birdman (1999)
- Pur [Pure] (2001)
- Y Ferch o Bedlam [The Girl from Bedlam] (2005)
- Cymun [Communion] (2012)
- Gosteg [Silence] (2018)

== Film ==
- Tylluan Wen (1997)
