= Peter Messaline =

English-Canadian actor

- Born: Peter John Burrell; 9 April 1944; London, England
- Died: 8 December 2016 (aged 72); Toronto, Ontario, Canada
- Occupations: Actor, Equity Campaigner
- Years active: 1968–2015
- Spouse: Miriam Newhouse (m. 1970)

Peter Messaline (9 April 1944 – 8 December 2016) was an English-Canadian actor.

== Biography ==
Born in London, he attended Queen Mary College, London University, where he read Physics and Geography. His first TV job was voicing the Daleks in the 1972 Doctor Who serial Day of the Daleks; the Dalek voices by him and Oliver Gilbert are generally disliked by fans and were redubbed by Nicholas Briggs for the Special Edition DVD release. He then appeared in an episode of Warship (reunited with Gilbert) and voiced Cliff in BBC radio soap opera Waggoners' Walk (1975–1977).

Upon emigrating to Canada with his wife, Miriam Newhouse, an actress, in 1977, Messaline resumed his acting career with appearances in Friday the 13th: The Series, RoboCop: The Series, Are You Afraid of the Dark?, Kung Fu: The Legend Continues, Goosebumps, Animorphs, Warehouse 13 and Murdoch Mysteries, as well as being a guest voice in The Raccoons.

An extensive theatre career included a tour with the Royal Shakespeare Company over England, Stratford, Europe, Japan and Australia. Messaline has also performed with the Actors Theatre of Louisville in Louisville, Kentucky.

For many years, Messaline was an expert on taxation for performers, linked to Equity, and campaigned for the rights of newcomers to the industry. With Newhouse, he wrote The Actor's Survival Kit, regarding the business of acting.

He died from cancer at a hospital in Toronto, Ontario, on 8 December 2016, at the age of 72.
