= Blodeuwedd =

Wife of Lleu Llaw Gyffes in Welsh mythology

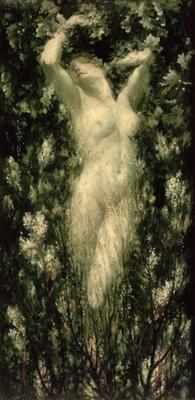
Blodeuwedd by Christopher Williams (1930)

In Welsh mythology, Blodeuwedd (Welsh pronunciation: [blɔˈdeiwɛð]; Welsh "Flower-Faced", a composite name from blodau "flowers" + gwedd "face") is married to Lleu Llaw Gyffes. She was made from the flowers of broom, meadowsweet and oak by the magicians Math and Gwydion, and is a central figure in Math fab Mathonwy, the last of the Four Branches of the Mabinogi.

== Role in Welsh tradition ==
The hero Lleu Llaw Gyffes has been placed under a tynged ("doom") by his mother, Arianrhod, that he may never have a human wife. To counteract this curse, the magicians Math and Gwydion:

[take] the flowers of the oak, and the flowers of the broom, and the flowers of the meadowsweet, and from those they conjured up the fairest and most beautiful maiden anyone had ever seen. And they baptized her in the way that they did at that time, and named her Blodeuwedd.

Some time later, while Lleu is away on business, Blodeuwedd has an affair with Gronw Pebr, the lord of Penllyn, and the two lovers conspire to murder Lleu. Blodeuwedd tricks Lleu into revealing how he may be killed, since he cannot be killed during the day or night, nor indoors or outdoors, neither riding nor walking, not clothed and not naked, nor by any weapon lawfully made. He reveals to her that he can only be killed at dusk, wrapped in a net, with one foot on a bath and one on a black goat, by a riverbank and by a spear forged for a year during the hours when everyone is at Mass. With this information, she arranges his death.

Blodeuwedd meets Gronw.

Struck by the spear thrown by Gronw's hand, Lleu transforms into an eagle and flies away. Gwydion tracks him down and finds him perched high on an oak tree. Through the singing of an englyn (known as englynion Gwydion) Gwydion lures Lleu down from the oak tree and switches him back to his human form. Gwydion and Math nurse Lleu back to health before mustering Gwynedd and reclaiming his lands from Gronw and Blodeuwedd.

Gwydion overtakes the fleeing Blodeuwedd and turns her into an owl (in Welsh tylluan or gwdihŵ), the creature hated by all other birds, proclaiming:

You will not dare to show your face ever again in the light of day ever again, and that will be because of enmity between you and all other birds. It will be in their nature to harass you and despise you wherever they find you. And you will not lose your name – that will always be "Bloddeuwedd (Flower-face)."

The narrative adds:

"Blodeuwedd" means "owl" in the language of today. And it is because of that there is hostility between birds and owls, and the owl is still known as "Blodeuwedd".

Meanwhile, Gronw escapes to Penllyn and sends emissaries to Lleu, to beg his forgiveness. Lleu refuses, demanding that Gronw must stand on the bank of the River Cynfael and receive a blow from his spear. Gronw desperately asks if anyone from his warband will take the spear in his place, but his men refuse his plea. Eventually, Gronw agrees to receive the blow on the condition that he may place a large stone between himself and Lleu. Lleu allows Gronw to do so, then throws the spear with such strength that it pierces the stone, killing his rival. A holed stone in Ardudwy is still known as Llech Ronw (Gronw's Stone).

Robert Graves and others consider lines 142–153 of Cad Goddeu to be a "Song of Blodeuwedd".

== In literature ==
- Alan Garner's novel The Owl Service (1967) makes the story of Blodeuwedd an eternal cycle played out each generation, in a Welsh valley. The only way to break the cycle is for the Blodeuwedd character to realise she is supposed to be flowers, not an owl.
- Louise M. Hewett explores the story of Blodeuwedd and Math Son of Mathonwy from a feminist perspective in the second and third books, Wind (2017) (ISBN 978-1536965056) and Flowers (2017) ( ISBN 978-1544883649), of her novel series, Pictish Spirit. Within the novels, a discussion about the three significant females in the story of Math Son of Mathonwy – Goewin, Arianrhod and Blodeuwedd – has taken place between Róisín and a group of the Pictish Spirit Braves. It culminates with Róisín's "re-vision" of the story in the closing chapter of Flowers, pages 810–814.
- Blodeuwedd's creation by Gwydion and Math is delicately described in the poem "The Wife of Llew" by Francis Ledwidge.
- The Blodeuwedd story is referenced in the novel and film Tylluan Wen.
- In John Cowper Powys's novel Porius: A Romance of the Dark Ages (1951), where the adulterous Blodeuwedd "is released from her prison of beak and feathers" by the magic of King Arthur's magician Myrddin (Merlin).
- Amal El-Mohtar's short story "Florilegia; or, Some Lies About Flowers" (2019), first published in The Mythic Dream, edited by Dominik Parisien and Navah Wolfe, is a retelling of the story through Blodeuwedd's perspective.
- The Welsh poet Matthew Francis, in The Mabinogi (2018), his translation of The Mabinogion, reimagines the story of Blodeuwedd in a cycle of poems.
- Bar Fridman-Tell's novel Honeysuckle (2026) is a loose reimagining of the story of Blodeuwedd, split between the perspectives of Blodeuwedd and her creator.
