= Waggoners' Walk =

British radio soap opera (1969–1980)

- Waggoners' Walk street sign illustration used by Radio Times in April 1969
- Other names: Waggoners' Walk NW
- Genre: Soap opera
- Running time: 15 minutes (4:30 pm – 4:45 pm)
- Country of origin: United Kingdom
- Language: English
- Home station: BBC Radio 2
- Created by: Jill Hyem; Alan Downer
- Written by: Peter Ling, Barbara Clegg, Terry James et al
- Original release: 28 April 1969 – 30 May 1980
- No. of episodes: 2,824

Waggoners' Walk is a daily radio soap opera, set in the fictional cul-de-sac of Waggoners' Walk and its environs in Hampstead, north London. It was broadcast daily on BBC Radio 2 from 1969 to 1980, in the form of fifteen-minute episodes on weekday afternoons with a repeat the following weekday morning. The programme came to a sudden end in May 1980 as part of a number of economies made by the BBC.

== History ==
Waggoners' Walk was introduced as a successor to the long-running The Dales (1948–1969), which had been cancelled due to the illness of the lead actress Jessie Matthews. The programme was created by writers Jill Hyem and Alan Downer; its origins lay in their Saturday Night Theatre production of The Ropewalk, broadcast on BBC Radio 4 in January 1969. This play featured some of the same characters, actors and theme tune of Waggoners' Walk with the story centering on three women who share a flat in Hampstead.

Waggoners' Walk was designed to feature "fast-moving stories" and have a "few taboo subjects". During its run, the storylines tackled issues such as illegitimacy, homosexuality, abortion, child custody and murder. The first edition was broadcast on the afternoon of 28 April 1969 with a repeat the following morning. Early editions were given a title, the first edition billed as "Moving Pictures" for instance, but this was dropped after just three weeks. Initially the programme had an audience of two million listeners but by 1974 was achieving four million.

Most of the storylines involved the tenants of No. 1 Waggoners' Walk, a large townhouse divided into several flats. Other settings included the local pub, The Waggoners, the offices of the Hampstead Herald, Minden Road and the nearby Belsize Park. Hyem and Downer continued to produce scripts for the programme throughout its run and were joined by other writers including Peter Ling, Barbara Clegg and Terry James. The directors included Piers Plowright, who later became the programme's executive producer, David Spenser, Glyn Dearman, Anton Gill, David Johnston and Kay Patrick.

In 1974, listeners were invited to submit their own plots in a "Write Your Own Storyline Competition", with the winning story submitted by Albert Kenyon broadcast in November 1974.

A Sunday-afternoon omnibus edition was added to the schedule in January 1980, though heard only on Radio 2's medium wave transmitters.

As part of a series of cost-cutting initiatives by the BBC in 1980, Waggoners' Walk came to an abrupt end on 30 May 1980 with a cliffhanger ending in which George Underdown proposes marriage to Sophie Richmond. The Corporation received more than 1,000 letters of protest about the ending of the programme. It rejected a request from Capital Radio to take it over.

== Cameo appearances ==
A number of famous people made cameo appearances on the programme:

- Jack de Manio in an edition in October 1969
- Pete Murray in the live 500th edition in April 1971
- Wilfrid Brambell and Harry H. Corbett in an edition in January 1975
- Esther Rantzen in two editions in June 1977 in which she opens a Silver Jubilee dance

== Principal characters ==
This is a list of some of the main characters that appeared over the 11-year run. In some cases more than one actor played the part.

- Mike Nash, ran a PR firm and later became editor of the weekly newspaper The Hampstead Herald. Mike and Claire owned No. 1 Waggoners' Walk from late 1969 to early 1980, when they moved to Bath. Played by Edward Cast.
- Claire Nash, a former fashion model. Played by Ellen McIntosh.
- Peter Tyson worked as Personnel Officer at Abercrombies, a central London department store. After resigning his job he worked part-time at a boatyard. Played by Basil Moss.
- Liz Tyson (née Warner), editor of the woman's page of the Hampstead Herald, who takes over from Mike Nash as the newspaper's editor in 1980. Played by Ann Morrish.
- Arthur Tyson, a widower and father of Peter Tyson. A retired former solicitor and estate agent. Played by Lockwood West and also by Peter Pratt and Gerald Cross.
- Karen, a young firebrand from Birmingham. The Tysons' au pair. Played by Fidelis Morgan.
- Matt Prior, ran Home from Home, a domestic agency and later a catering supplier, with Lynn Tyson. Following a private aircraft crash in late 1974, he began using a wheelchair. Married Lynn in 1975 and later they opened up a restaurant called Priors. Played by Michael Spice.
- Lynn Prior (née Dixon) initially shared a flat with her sister Tracey and Barbara Watling. Married Peter Tyson in late 1969 and had a son Jeremy in 1972. Following her divorce she married Matt Prior. Played by Judy Franklin.
- Mrs Tandy, part-time cleaner for the Nashes. Played by Grizelda Hervey.
- Rupert 'Rusty' Vaughan, the original owner of No. 1 Waggoners' Walk until he sold it in late 1969. Continued to occupy the studio flat until December 1972. Played by Nicholas Edmett and later by Derek Seaton
- Stan Hickey, who, with his wife Alice, had been a tenant of the basement flat for more than 20 years. Died in 1972. Played by Leslie Dwyer later by Edward Evans.
- Alice Hickey, married to Stan and then to Gordon Turner. Played by Hazel Coppen. After her death the character continued played by Hilda Kriseman, Anna Wing and finally Peggy Aitchison.
- Gordon Turner owned the local newsagents. Married Alice in 1973. Played by Will Leighton.
- Barbara Watling, moved from Hull to flat-share with Lynn and Tracey. Her illegitimate daughter Emma Jane was born in 1973. She married Colin Bartley in 1974 and they both ran an antique shop. Played by Heather Stoney and later by Patricia Gallimore.
- Jack Munro, the Canadian nephew of Gordon Turner ran the Waggoners pub and later married Kay Marsh. Played by Rod Beacham and then by Malcolm Terris.
- Kay Munro (née Marsh) worked as a barmaid at the Waggoners and married Jack Munro in 1972. Played by Frances Jeater and then by Jo Kendall.
- Cliff Edwards, married to Shirley. The couple were unable to have children and considered adoption but, after a one-night stand with Debbie Franks in 1979, Cliff became the father to Sam in 1980. Played by Anthony Jackson and also by Peter Messaline and Sion Probert.
- Shirley Edwards (née Cook). Played by Carole Boyd.
- George Underdown, a former bank employee who married Kath Miller. After her death he befriends Sophie Richmond and, despite being 30 years her senior, proposes marriage. Played by Alan Dudley.
- Sophie Richmond, a waitress at Priors restaurant. In 1979 she is raped by a man she later identifies as a regular customer. Played by Glynis Brooks.
- Kath Miller, mother of Shirley Edwards, ran the newsagent's and married George Underdown but died of a heart attack in 1979. Played by Charlotte Mitchell.
- Ben Woodhouse, the local GP who later marries Soo-Ming. Played mainly by David Valla and sometimes by Derek Seaton.
- Debbie Franks, a reporter on the Hampstead Herald. Played by Tara Soppet.
- Mrs. Dixon, Lynn's mother. Played by Dorothy Edwards.

Other actors appearing in the programme included Peter Tuddenham, Michael Troughton, Norma Ronald, Barry Creyton, Jeffrey Segal, Harry Fowler, Patrick Allen, Hattie Jacques (appearing briefly in 1969 as sisters Harriet and Tilly Gibbon), Nigel Lambert, Christian Rodska, Robert Beatty, Saeed Jaffrey, Bruce Alexander, Gillian McCutcheon, Pik-Sen Lim, Harry Towb and Elaine Stritch.

== Theme music ==
The original theme tune, titled "Bees and Honey", was composed by Derek Hilton under the pseudonym of John Snow. Several arrangements of the theme were used throughout the programme's run. In 1971, an EP of songs featured in the programme, including one called Waggoners' Walk, and credited to Trane, was issued by BBC Records.
