= Raymond Llewellyn =

Welsh actor (1928–2026)

- Born: Raymond Llewellyn Jones; 15 August 1928; Cardiff, Wales
- Died: 5 June 2026 (aged 97); Merthyr Tydfil, Wales
- Occupation: Actor
- Years active: 1950–1970 • 1976–1978 • 1985–2008 • 2022

Raymond Llewellyn Jones (15 August 1928 – 5 June 2026), known professionally as Raymond Llewellyn, was a Welsh actor.

== Early life ==
Raymond Llewellyn Jones was born in Cardiff, Wales on 15 August 1928.

Having to studying in Leicester (since it was the only place he could get in), Llewellyn came down with rheumatic fever while in the lower sixth form so was unable to do his 'A' Levels meaning he had to do an extra year. Upon leaving Leicester University at age 23 with an English degree, he assumed he'd become a teacher but didn't really want to teach. Out of the blue, Llewellyn decided to go into acting after emoting pieces of Shakespeare around the house and having an interest whilst at school. His history master's wife advised him to join the Cardiff College of Music and Drama. From 1952, Llewellyn stayed there for two years before going into repertory at Pontypridd and Sunderland for two months at each place. After writing to the Old Vic for an audition, he spent a year there in 1954/55.

== Career ==
His earliest major role was in the original West End production of Under Milk Wood, playing Mr Pugh in 1956. He was also known for his role as Huw in the cult fantasy series The Owl Service. Llewellyn stated that these two parts were the standout roles in his career.

He also appeared in the 1967 Doctor Who serial The Abominable Snowmen as Sapan, and the 1978 film The Thief of Bagdad. He also worked for the Royal Shakespeare Company.

Later work included parts in TV dramas Holby City and Doctors. He also played the role of Madoc in the TV series Cadfael with Derek Jacobi.

Other work includes Mr Pugh in the 1963 BBC Radio version of Under Milk Wood with Richard Burton; 1984-5 in New York/Washington and three weeks in Los Angeles with Cyrano de Bergerac & Much Ado About Nothing starring Derek Jacobi, as well as ten weeks in Los Angeles with the Royal National Theatre Production of Henrik Ibsen's An Enemy of the People starring Ian McKellen. He played in three seasons at the Ludlow Festival Shakespeare productions directed by Michael Bogdanov. His last work before his retirement was in the film The Edge of Love, about an incident in the life of Dylan Thomas, with Keira Knightley.

Llewellyn died on 5 June 2026, aged 97.
