= Thomas Richard =

Calvinistic Methodist minister

Thomas Richard (11 February 1783 – 3 January 1856) was a Calvinistic Methodist minister.

== Personal life ==
Thomas was born to Henry and Hannah Richard in Trefin, Pembrokeshire. His brother, Ebenezer Richard, was also a Methodist preacher. He married Bridget Gwyn of Maenorowen in 1819, niece to the second wife of David Jones of Llan-gan, also a famous Methodist. Richard pursued a farming life after marriage before retiring to Fishguard in 1825 until his death. He is buried at Maenorowen.

== Religious life ==
As a youth, Thomas Richard joined the religious society at Tre-fin. He began preaching in 1803 and developed a reputation across Wales for his powerful sermons. In 1814, he was ordained at the Association in Llangeitho. His sermons were published by Edward Matthews 1866-7.
