= The Owl Service (TV series) =

British children's TV series (1969–1970)

- Genre: Fantasy, Legend
- Written by: Alan Garner
- Directed by: Peter Plummer
- Starring: Gillian Hills; Michael Holden; Francis Wallis; Edwin Richfield; Dorothy Edwards; Raymond Llewellyn
- Theme music composer: Opening: Pierre Arvay (played by Lily Laskine); Closing: Trad, (played by Jean Bell)
- Opening theme: "The Fountain of Merlin"
- Ending theme: "Tôn Alarch"
- Country of origin: United Kingdom
- Original language: English
- No. of series: 1
- No. of episodes: 8

Production
- Producer: Peter Plummer
- Camera setup: Multi-camera
- Running time: c. 25 minutes per episode

Original release
- Network: ITV (Granada Television)
- Release: 21 December 1969 – 8 February 1970

The Owl Service is an eight-part television series based on the fantasy novel of the same name by Alan Garner. Produced in 1969 and televised over the winter of 1969–1970, the series was remarkably bold in terms of production. It was the first fully scripted colour production by Granada Television and was filmed almost entirely on location at a time when almost all TV drama was studio-bound. It used editing techniques such as jump cuts to create a sense of disorientation and also to suggest that two time periods overlapped. For the series, the book was adapted in seven scripts (later stretched to eight) by Garner and was produced and directed by Peter Plummer.

== Background ==
Following the success of the novel, which had won the Carnegie Medal and Guardian Award for children's literature, there was much interest in turning the story into a TV series with three companies vying for the rights. In the end, during the summer of 1968, Granada won out, approaching Alan Garner to script the series himself. The director chosen was Peter Plummer, who also acted as producer.

== Production ==
Since the novel was based on real locations, Plummer opted to use the same places where possible, However, one key location, Bryn Hall, could not be used, so these interior and exterior scenes were filmed at Poulton Hall near Liverpool. The rest of the filming took place around the village on Dinas Mawddwy, Merionethshire, Wales. The valley and village described in the book is actually Llanymawddwy by Bryn Hall, but it proved more practical to film in the larger Dinas Mawddwy, which had better facilities that allowed filming without blocking the roads. Filming began on location on 11 April and ended on 20 June. Alan Garner recalls that location filming fell behind schedule due to 'difficulties' with some of the young lead actors. With only two days left in Wales the Granada crew effectively took control of the filming, and were able to complete the shoot on time by omitting some scenes (e.g. the taxi arriving to take Nancy out of the valley) and changing others (the children chopping down the telephone pole rather than the pole falling down in the storm). A few studio scenes were shot for the production, with these wrapping up on 3 July 1969. Trailers for the series were also shot, featuring material not used in the finished show.

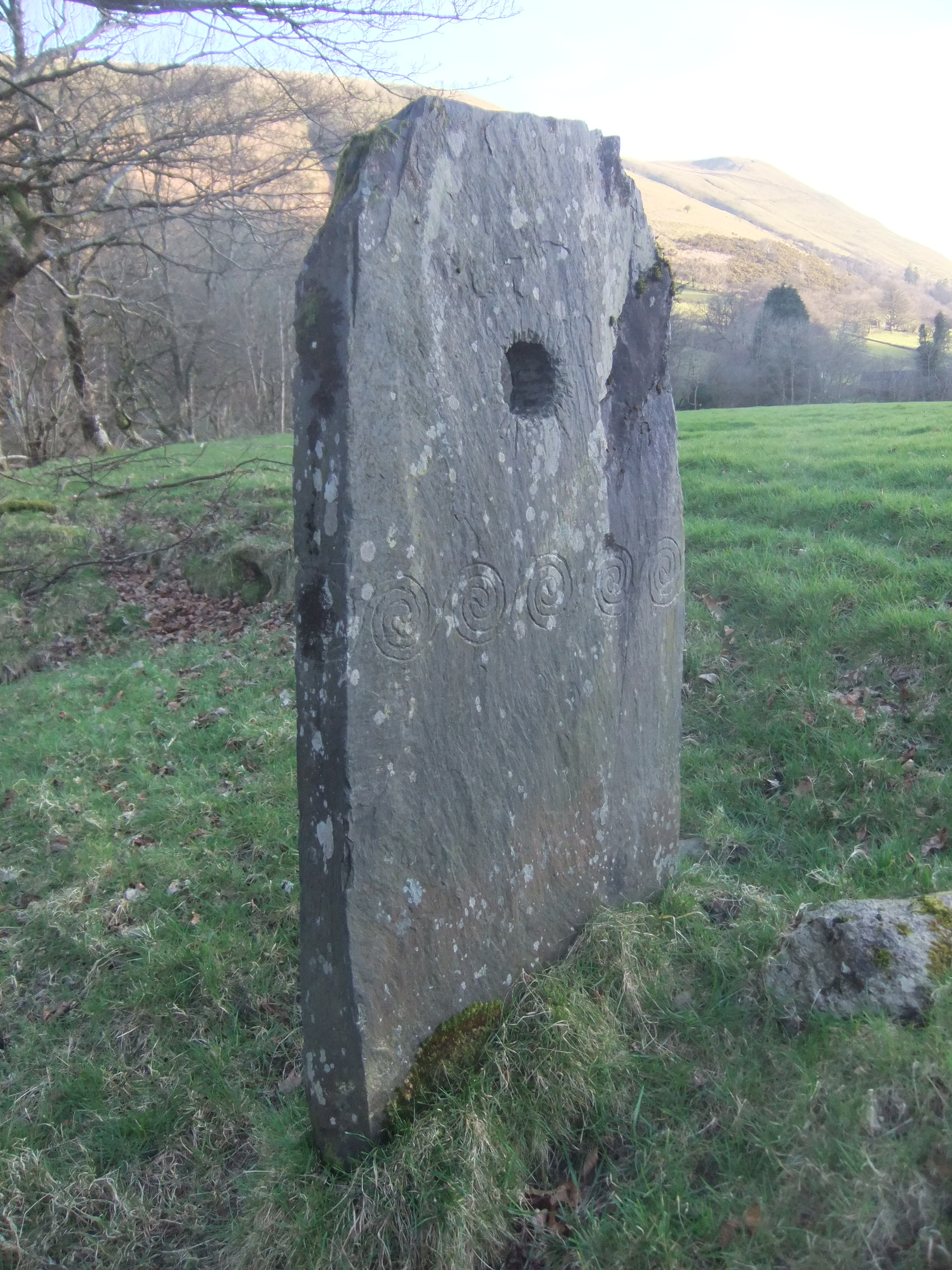
The Stone of Gronw on the bank of the River Dovey was carved by Edward Rowlands for Granada TV's The Owl Service in 1969

Llech Ronw (The Stone of Gronw) for the series was carved by local stone mason Edward Rowlands from a brief by designer Peter Caldwell: "An upright piece of slab stone or slate (like a gatepost) with a 4" dia rough hole cut through it 1'.0" from the top and a roughly etched grooved pattern of circles 2'.0" from the top. The stone should be 5'.00" above the ground and 2".0 below. The stone should be very rough and weather-worn and will represent an ancient monument". After the production was finished the stone was left in situ by the River Dovey below Bryn Hall but Rowlands added his name to the carving so that his work would not be mistaken for a real ancient monument.

The opening theme music was "The Fountain of Merlin", a library piece by Pierre Arvay, performed by Lily Laskine. The closing music was the traditional folk piece "Tôn Alarch" played on the harp by Jean Bell, while the incidental music was also taken from stock sources. The title sequence featured a hand shadow depicting an owl in flight, photographs of the valley and a flickering candle along with sound effects.

== Cast ==
The parts of the three main characters, Gwyn, Roger and Alison, were played by Michael Holden, Francis Wallis and Gillian Hills respectively. The ages of the characters are never stated, but in contrast to the novel, where they were fifteen, for this adaptation they were slightly older, often considered seventeen. Hills and Wallis themselves were in their early twenties at the time of production, while Holden was nineteen. For the older characters, well-known character actors Edwin Richfield, Dorothy Edwards and Raymond Llewellyn played Clive, Nancy and Huw, respectively. The role of Margaret was never cast – the character being frequently present, but never seen. Both writer and producer appeared in the production – Garner as one of the villagers and Plummer in a photograph as the deceased Bertram. Many of the cast later commented on the lasting effects the serial had on them, Holden commenting that it felt like "we were personally living the whole thing", while Hills said that "it was all so real, it was frightening". Llewellyn said in 2008 that the role of Huw has haunted him ever since.

== Episodes ==
For an overall plot description see the novel's article: The Owl Service.

No.	Title	Original release date
1	"The Owl Service"	11 December 1969
Holidaying in rural Wales, Alison, mother Margaret, new stepfather Clive and his son, Roger are staying at a manor house formerly owned by Alison's uncle Bertram. Alison befriends the cook's son Gwyn. Together, they discover a set of dinner plates with a floral pattern, which Alison traces and forms into paper owls. Gwyn's mother Nancy is furious and demands the plates be returned. At night, Alison becomes possessed and as Roger looks in on her, she scratches his face.
2	"The Mystery Deepens"	28 December 1969
The half-crazed gardener, Huw, tells Gwyn of an ancient legend and hints that the three teenagers may be in danger of re-enacting the story. Alison is acting strangely as she becomes taken with the female character of the myth. In the billiard room, Clive is astonished to see the wood panelling on the wall crumbling away to reveal a picture of a woman made of flowers.
3	"A Strange Picture"	4 January 1970
Alison has hidden the plates away in a hut in the forest and becomes obsessed with the need to trace the pattern. Gwyn joins her in the hut and they spend the night there. In the morning, Huw rambles on to Gwyn that he was also one of three caught up in the legend and claims he is lord of the valley.
4	"The Plates Are Hidden"	11 January 1970
Roger is disturbed by some photographs he has taken in the valley which seem to depict a ghost. Nancy tells Gwyn that she had an affair with Bertram and bemoans the fact that she should have been the owner of the house rather than Margaret. Margaret meanwhile has forbidden Alison to see Gwyn, but while out walking, Alison meets up with him. Unknown to them, Margaret is watching through binoculars.
5	"Betrayal"	18 January 1970
Alison and Gwyn become closer as they walk up the mountain, while Roger is at home feeling increasingly depressed and expresses his desire to leave to Clive. Alison and Gwyn promise to meet up every day out of sight of their parents at an agreed time, but on her return to the house, Alison is forbidden to see him. A few days later, Roger, Alison and Clive discover a locked door in the stables and wonder what's inside. Alison then realises that she is in her and Gwyn's meeting place and as he steps out of hiding, she is forced to snub him.
6	"The Missing Key"	25 January 1970
Gwyn is furious at the treatment he has been shown by Alison and is further upset by his mother. In an attempt to bond, Alison and Roger talk together and she reveals some of the things Gwyn had told her while on the mountain. Later, Gwyn corners Alison and forces her to discuss what's going on between them. Roger shows up and mockingly tells Gwyn he knows his secrets. Gwyn is enraged and storms away, determined to leave the valley and everyone behind.
7	"Who Is There?"	1 February 1970
Gwyn has spent the night on a mountain when Huw catches up with him. Huw explains that the legend was re-enacted by him, Bertram and Nancy and is now being enacted again by Gwyn, Roger and Alison and can only end in pain. Gwyn is not interested until Huw reveals that he is his father. At the house, Roger decides to find out what is in the stable and goes to force open the door.
8	"The Legend Unravels"	8 February 1970
On opening the door, Roger finds a table full of paper owls – the same as Alison had been making, but these were put there by Nancy. At the house, Gwyn has returned but is told by Nancy they are leaving. Struggling through the heavy rain with their cases, Gwyn tells her he is staying and she leaves him behind. Alison has become completely possessed by the legend and collapses. Huw takes her inside as scratches and feathers appear all over her. In panic, Roger attempts to help, but Gwyn refuses. Finally, Roger manages to talk Alison out of her state by realising the pattern on the plates was of flowers, not owls.

== Broadcast and reception ==
During a test screening of episode one prior to broadcast, the concern was raised by Granada that the story was difficult to follow, so recap sequences were added to the start of each episode which explained the story so far. On original broadcast, due to a technicians' strike, the series was transmitted in black and white.

Many contemporary reviews were complimentary about the production, although some expressed the concern that it was not suitable for younger viewers. The Observer said that it was "far more than an ordinary children's story" and made comment on "the adult passions working themselves out in the three adolescents". In 1970, ITV nominated the series for the Prix Jeunesse – the leading award for children's films. The series failed to succeed, as Plummer later explained: "the jury in Munich found it 'deeply disturbing' and questioned whether it was not indeed reprehensible to offer such material to young people". Owing to this the series proved difficult to sell to overseas companies. During the 1980s, however, many did purchase the series, and it was screened for the first time in countries such as Spain and Ireland. Still, some cuts were made to the episodes (such as Gwyn's "Dirty-minded bitch" line and Alison's scream in the final episode) although perhaps the most striking scene – a sequence from episode 3 depicting Gwyn's struggle with Alison in what appears to be a simulation of rape – remained intact. More recently, reviewer Kim Newman said "It's unthinkable that something as complex, ambiguous, difficult and strange as The Owl Service could be broadcast on British television in a prime time slot these days - let alone on ITV1 as a children's programme". He compared elements of the series to experimental directors such as Alain Resnais or Chris Marker and concluding it was a "classic". Today, The Owl Service is considered by many to be a landmark in children's drama, and it has been hailed as a classic production, and daring in its presentation.

The serial was repeated in 1978. This resulted in Granada placing an end cap with a copyright date of 1978 which might have confused viewers who didn't realise it was actually produced nine years earlier. According to the TV Times, this repeat was a tribute to cameraman David Wood who had died a few months earlier. No reference was made to the death of Michael Holden who had been murdered in an unprovoked pub attack in September 1977. A further repeat took place on Channel 4 in 1987. Despite its success, The Owl Service was never issued on VHS, but was released on DVD in April 2008, and on Blu-ray, remastered in HD, in October 2022.

An audio dramatisation of The Owl Service was produced and transmitted by BBC Radio 4 in 2000.

== External information ==
- "Filming The Owl Service-A Children's Diary" by Ellen, Adam and Katharine Garner, 1970 William Collins and Co Ltd.
- "Timescreen" Issue 10, Winter 1987
- "I've Seen a Ghost", by Richard Davis, 1979 Hutchinson Junior Books Ltd.
