= Dorothy Edwards (actress) =

Welsh actress

Dorothy Edwards (29 March 1917 – 13 August 1979, Devizes, Wiltshire, England) was a Welsh actress who worked in television, radio, and theatre from the late 1930s through the late 1970s. She is best remembered for portraying Mrs. Oakley in the first season of Crossroads in 1964, and for the role of Nancy in the mini-series The Owl Service between 1969 and 1970. She also had lengthy stints on BBC radio portraying Mrs Dixon in Waggoners' Walk and Mrs. Manning in Mrs Dale's Diary. She had a close association with the Castle Theatre, Farnham at which she appeared in more than 200 parts. She was a founding member of the Redgrave Theatre, Farnham.

== Life and career ==
Born in Wrexham, Wales, Edwards was trained at the Royal Academy of Dramatic Art. She began her career as an actress in repertory at the Oxford Playhouse. She also appeared in productions in theaters in Manchester, Canterbury, and Plymouth before joining Emlyn Williams's theatre company. With Williams she toured internationally and throughout the United Kingdom from 1941 to 1944. She had a lengthy association with the Castle Theatre, Farnham at which she portrayed more than 200 roles during 1950s, 1960s, and early 1970s. After that theatre closed, she assisted in the establishment of the Redgrave Theatre, Farnham in 1974 of which she was a founding member.

Edwards made her television debut in 1947 as Menna in the television film The Wind of Heaven in which she starred opposite Basil Langton. In 1964 she portrayed Mrs. Oakley in the first season of Crossroads, and she starred as Nancy in the mini-series The Owl Service (1969–1970). Her other television credits include Mr. Sheridan's Umbrella (1957), Armchair Mystery Theatre (1960), Emergency Ward 10 (1961), The Odd Man (1963), Perry Mason (1963−4), ITV Play of the Week (1965, as Mother in Women Beware Women), The Secret Agent (1967), Man in a Suitcase (1967), Theatre 625 (1967−1968), and Sherlock Holmes (1968).

On radio, she had lengthy runs as Mrs Dixon in Waggoners' Walk and Mrs. Manning in Mrs Dale's Diary.

She died at Devizes Hospital after becoming ill during a performance of Alan Ayckbourn's Bedroom Farce at the Connaught Theatre in Worthing, West Sussex.
