= Llanrhian =

Village, parish and community in Pembrokeshire, Wales

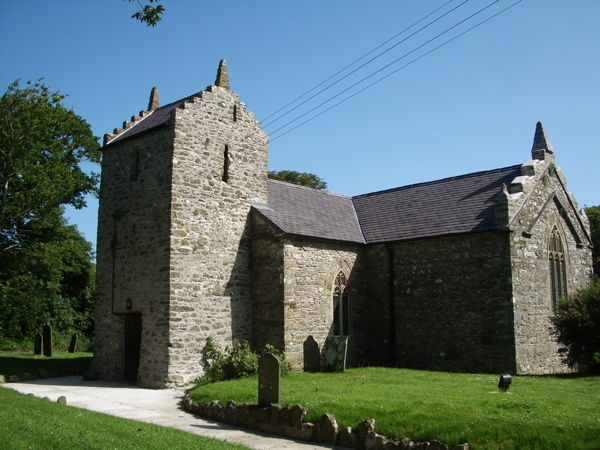
- St Rhian's church.

- Location within Pembrokeshire
- Population: 892 (2011)
- OS grid reference: SM8131
- Community: Llanrhian
- Principal area: Pembrokeshire
- Country: Wales
- Sovereign state: United Kingdom
- Post town: Haverfordwest
- Postcode district: SA62
- Dialling code: 01348
- Police: Dyfed-Powys
- Fire: Mid and West Wales
- Ambulance: Welsh
- UK Parliament: Ceredigion Preseli
- Senedd Cymru – Welsh Parliament: Ceredigion Penfro
- List of places UK Wales Pembrokeshire 51.93813°N 5.1728°W Map of the community

Llanrhian is a small village, community and parish in Pembrokeshire in west Wales, near the coast, south of Porthgain village. The community of Llanrhian includes the settlements of Llanhowell (Welsh: Llanhywel), Croesgoch, Portheiddy, Porthgain and Trefin. The village church is St Rhian’s and is of medieval origin. The village is in the Pembrokeshire Coast National Park.

== History ==
Originally part of the Cantref of Pebediog (later Dewisland Hundred) granted in perpetuity to the Bishops of St Davids in 1082, the manors of Llanrhian, Castle Morris and Priskilly were, prior to 1175, granted to Maurice Fitzgerald by his brother, David Fitzgerald, second Norman approved Bishop of St Davids.

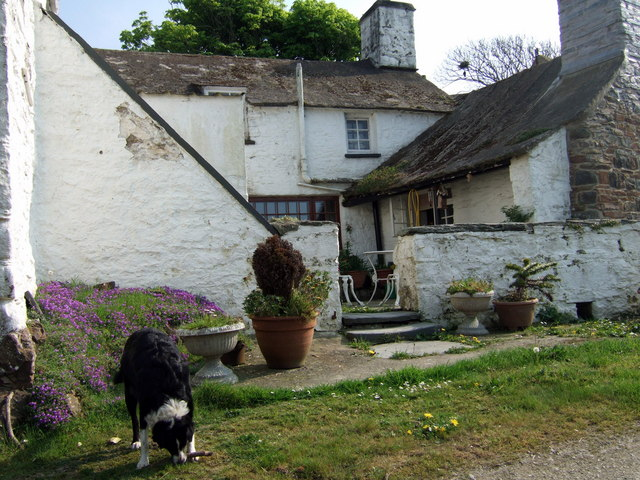
Old manor cottage

The manors remained with Fitzgerald's descendants, by then settled in Ireland, until 1302 when Sir John Wogan, Chancellor of St Davids and Lord Justiciar of Ireland bought out the remaining Fitzgerald interests in all three manors.

Castle Morris and Priskilly were returned to the bishopric but Llanrhian appears to have remained in the Wogan family until the 17th century when it passed by marriage into the Le Hunte family of Artramont. The Le Hunte's then in turn retained Llanrhian manor until the 1880s when it was sold to Henry Prosser, ancestor of the present owner.

According to the 2011 census the village had a population of 892.

== Notable buildings ==
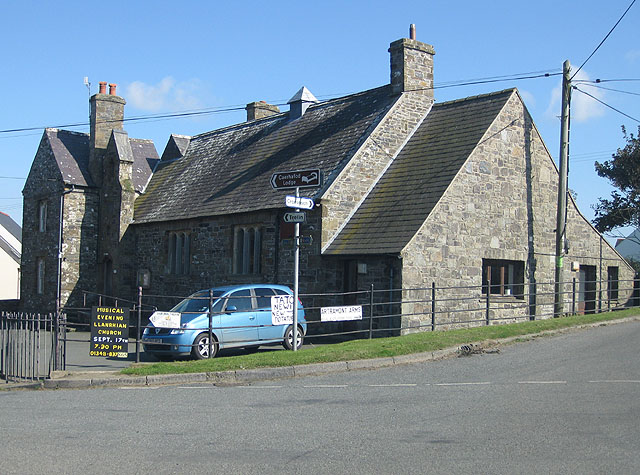
Former school

Llanrhian's church is dedicated to St Rhian and is a grade II* listed building.

The village has an old school and farm cottage, built in 1769.

A farm named Barry Island farm and the hamlet of Ynys Barri lies just to the northwest of the village which are not to be confused with Barry Island in southeast Wales in the Vale of Glamorgan.

Llanrhian's stone watermill, Melin Llanrhian, is now a holiday cottage. The old machinery used in the mill still remains.

The Watch Cottage is a well known grade two listed building. It is let as a holiday cottage and painted by many artists, including John Knapp-Fisher who lived and worked in the next village of Croesgoch It is described as a good example of Pembrokeshire vernacular architecture due to its Grouted roof.

== Governance ==
An electoral ward of the same name exists. This ward stretched to Mathry with a total population of 1,464.

Following a boundary review by the Local Government Boundary Commission for Wales, the community of Pencaer was added to the ward, effective from the 2022 Pembrokeshire County Council election.
