= Edward Matthews (author) =

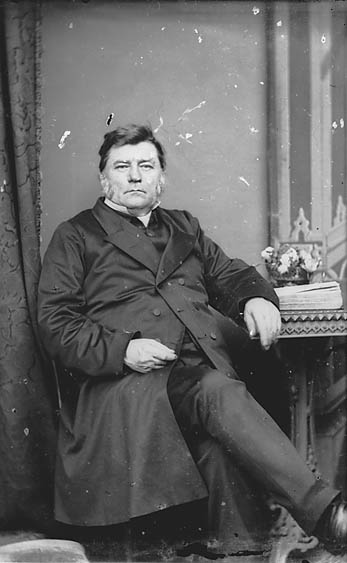

Personal life
- Born: 13 May 1813
- Died: 26 November 1892 (aged 79)
- Notable work(s): Hanes Bywyd Siencyn Penhydd; Bywgraffiad Thomas Richard; George Heycock a'i Amserau
- Occupation: minister and author

Religious life
- School: Calvinistic Methodist
- Ordination: 1841

Edward Matthews (13 May 1813 – 26 November 1892) was a Welsh Calvinistic Methodist minister and author.

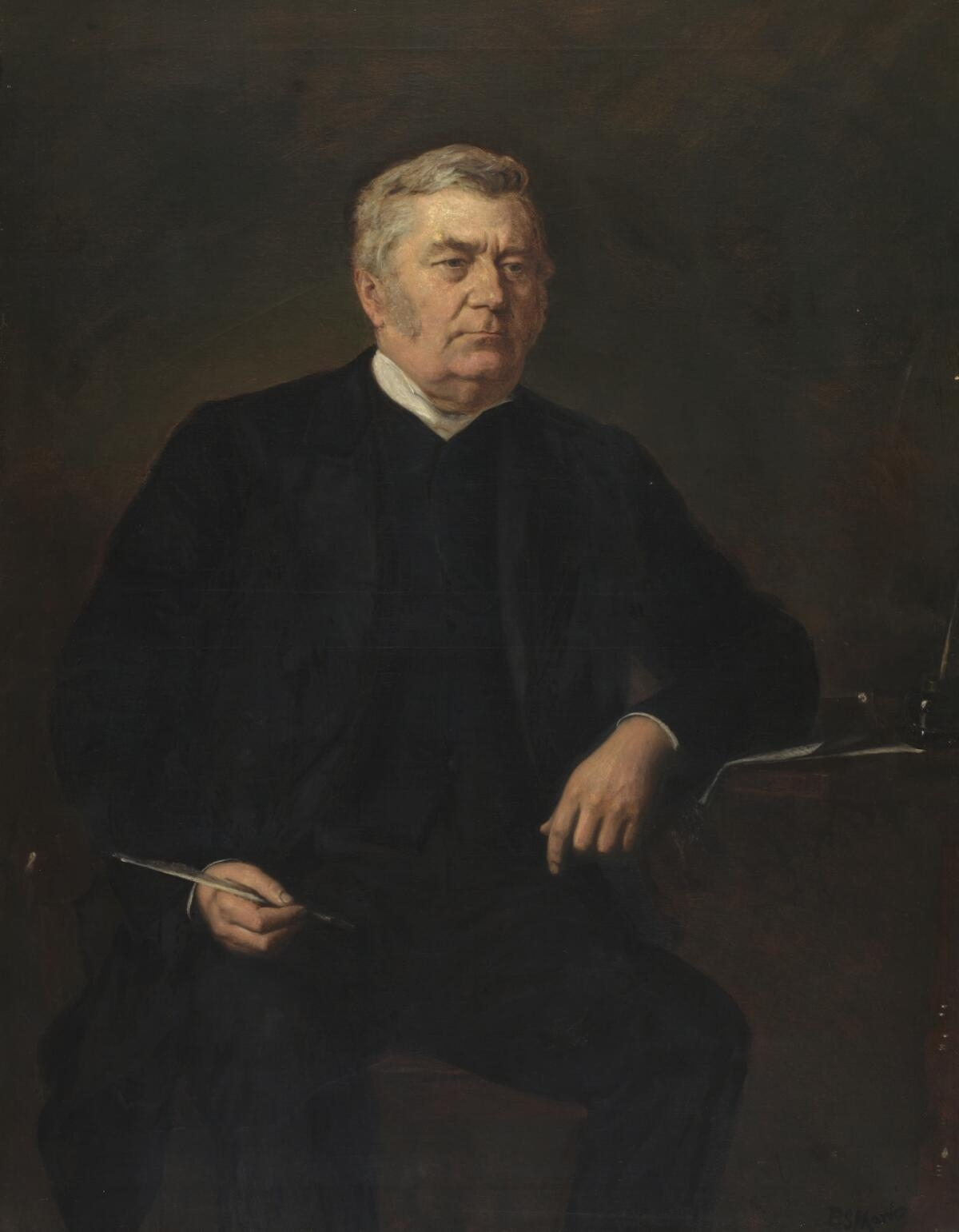
Rev. Edward Matthews

== Religious life ==
Influenced by the ministry of David Morris, Matthews began to preach at Hirwaun in Wales in 1830, having worked there from 1827. Matthews moved back to Glamorgan in 1833 and was ordained in 1841 at Llangeitho's Association. He was a student at Trevecka in 1843 and became minister in 1849 at Pontypridd's Penuel chapel. He moved to Ewenni Isaf in 1852 and later Cardiff in 1864. From 1876 to 1883 he lived at Bonvilston but returned to Bridgend before his death in 1892.

Matthews gained a reputation as an imaginative and dramatic preacher, known for his sudden outcries. He has been deemed "the uncrowned king of the Calvinistic Methodist Associations".

== Written works ==
Edward Matthews published a volume of sermons in 1927, edited by D. M. Phillips. However, his most popular works were his biographies. Hanes Bywyd Siencyn Penhydd, concerning the life of Jenkin Thomas, was published in book form in 1850, Bywgraffiad Thomas Richard (on Thomas Richard) in 1863 and George Heycock a'i Amserau in 1867. He was also join author of Cofiant J. Harris Jones (on John Harris Jones) in 1886 and edited two volumes each of Morgan Howells (in 1858 and 1869) and Thomas Richards (in 1866 and 1867). He often wrote articles for Y Traethodydd, Y Drysorfa and Y Cylchgrawn, to the extent that W. Llywel Morgan edited a volume of Matthews's published articles in 1911.

== Personal life ==
Edward was born at New Barn near St Athan to Thomas and Anne Matthews. As a child, his parents split and his father emigrated to the US. In 1833, he lived in Glamorgan as a lodger to the widow Mrs. Truman at Pen-llin. He and Mrs. Truman married in 1843. Matthews is buried in Nolton churchyard.

== See also ==
- D. G. Jones, Cofiant y Parchedig Edward Matthews o Eweni gyda dyfyniadau o'i ysgrifeniadau, a dwy bregeth, Denbigh, 1893, 1893
- J. J. Morgan, Cofiant Edward Matthews, Ewenni, Mold, 1922, 1922.
