= Huw Llwyd =

Welsh Poet

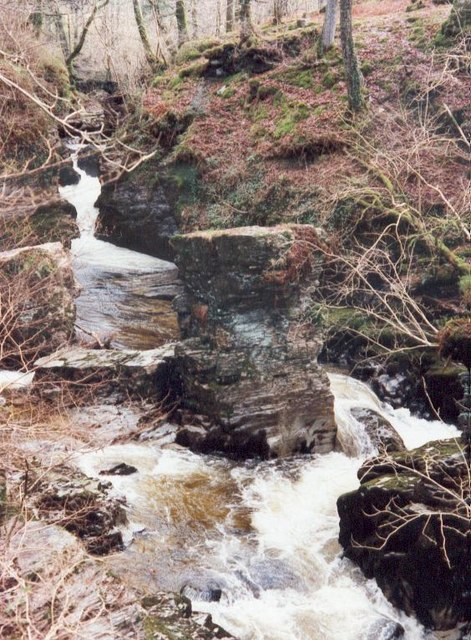
Huw Llwyd's pulpit, a rock stack in the middle of the Afon Cynfal.

Huw Llwyd (c. 1568–1630) also known as Huw Llwyd Cynfal was a Welsh-language soldier and poet.

== Family and origins ==
Huw Llwyd was born around 1568. The son of Dafydd Llwyd ap Howel ap Rhys. He lived at Cynfal Fawr in the parish of Maentwrog, Merioneth. He and his brother Owen Llwyd bought a large amount of land in the area. His wife came from the house of Hendre-mur, also known as Mur-castell, about two miles from Cynfal.

== Life and occupation ==
Huw Llwyd was a soldier, physician and bard. He served in a Welsh regiment that fought in France and Holland during the campaigns against Spain in the Low Countries. He had some knowledge of medicine and was believed locally to have skill in wizardry.

== Achievements ==
He was known as a famous sportsman. He had a reputation for hunting and wrote poems about foxes and hounds. He lived at Cynfal Fawr at least until 1629 and outlived his neighbour, Edmund Prys, the archdeacon.

== Works ==
Huw Llwyd wrote poetry in both strict and free metre. Several poems about hunting are among his best known. Two poems to the fox have also been attributed to Edmund Prys. In one cywydd, he asked Thomas Prys of Plas Iolyn in Denbighshire for a pair of hounds. The Book of William Wynne of Lasynys a manuscript treatise on medicine, copied by Ellis Wynne (Peniarth MS 123), came from Huw Llwyd's collection.

== Mentions in the works of others ==
- The poet Huw Machno described Cynfal Fawr in a poem from about 1630.
- Hugh Salesbury referred to Huw Llwyd in a cywydd, dated 6 October 1606, which records a request to Edward Lloyd of St Asaph to give Huw Llwyd a greyhound pup.
- Huw Llwyd and his Magical Books., Welsh Folk-lore A Collection of the Folk-tales and Legends of North Wales : Being the Prize Essay of the National Eisteddfod, 1887 by Elias Owen, 1887, pp. 252–253
- Witches transforming themselves into Cats., Welsh Folk-lore A Collection of the Folk-tales and Legends of North Wales : Being the Prize Essay of the National Eisteddfod, 1887 by Elias Owen, 1887, pp. 224–226
- Magic, Divination, Witchcraft, Charms, Welsh folklore and folk-custom by T. Gwynn Jones, 1930, p. xxv
- Ghosts and other apparitions, Welsh folklore and folk-custom by T. Gwynn Jones, 1930, p. 39
