= Abereiddy =

Village in Pembrokeshire, Wales

Coordinates: 51.934295°N 5.205683°W

Abereiddy: Welsh: Abereddi
- Location within Pembrokeshire
- OS grid reference: SM 79724 31055
  - Cardiff: 116 mi (187 km)
- Community: Llanrhian
- Principal area: Pembrokeshire
- Preserved county: Dyfed
- Country: Wales
- Sovereign state: United Kingdom
- Post town: HAVERFORDWEST
- Postcode district: SA62
- Police: Dyfed-Powys
- Fire: Mid and West Wales
- Ambulance: Welsh
- UK Parliament: Preseli Pembrokeshire
- Senedd Cymru – Welsh Parliament: Preseli Pembrokeshire

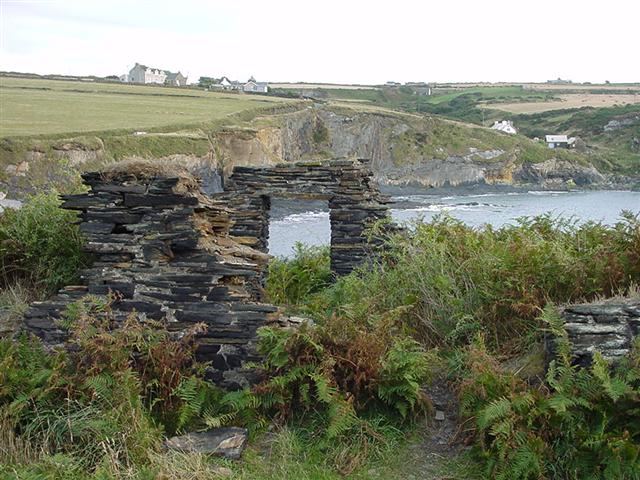
Abandoned slate quarryman's cottage in The Street

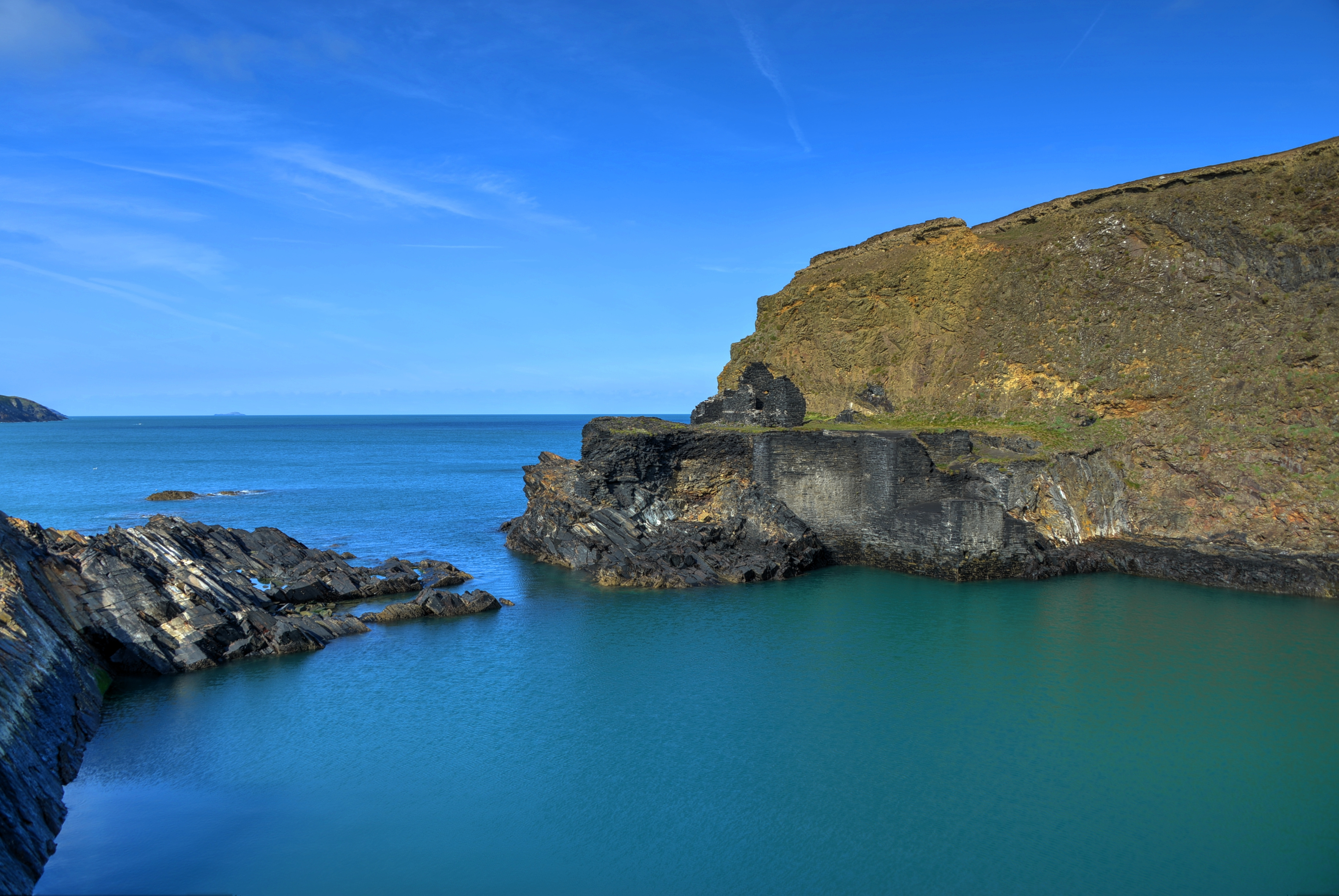
The Blue Lagoon

Abereiddy (Welsh: Abereddi) is a hamlet in the county of Pembrokeshire, in west Wales.

It has a small beach which was awarded the Blue flag rural beach award in 2005. A large car park adjoins the beach, where in the summer an ice cream van can usually be found. The beach also has public toilets which are open from Easter to October half-term. The Pembrokeshire Coast Path gives fine walking in both directions. The Common which runs inland behind the beach lies within the Manor of Llanrhian.

It is home to the now famous Blue Lagoon, where the "Red Bull Diving" championships have been held. The Blue Lagoon was created when the wall of an old slate mine was blasted to let the sea in. It is also popular for "coasteering" where people dive into the sea, swim and clamber along the cliffs.

Following the coast path north leads to Porthgain. Abereiddy to Porthgain is roughly a forty-minute walk.

The coastal path taken in the other direction to the south east goes around St Davids Head and on to Whitesands Bay.

== The Blue Lagoon ==
Nearby are the ruins of the 'Blue Lagoon', a small slate quarry, now flooded by the sea having broken in. Initially slate was exported across Abereiddy beach, but later through a tramway to the harbour at Porthgain a couple of miles to the North. Although never as large a quarry as even those nearer Porthgain itself, it did operate a steam-hauled lift. Ruins of a small group of slate houses known as The Street remain near the beach. These were houses built for the quarry workers of the Blue Lagoon and were only abandoned after a flood in the early 20th century.

The Blue Lagoon is 25m deep, according to a nearby Pembrokeshire National Park information board. Despite the name, the water is always a distinct greenish hue, owing to the mineral content within the quarry. The lagoon is a favourite for adventure groups practising coasteering and diving.

== World diving championships ==
In September 2012 the Blue Lagoon at Abereiddy was the location for one of the stages of the Red Bull Cliff Diving World Series, making its UK debut. Fourteen of the world's best divers dived from a man-made platform, 27 metres above the Blue Lagoon.

The championships returned in September 2013, and September 2016.

== Appearances on film ==
Abereiddy (the Blue Lagoon) appeared in the music video for the hit song "Silence" by Delerium (featuring Sarah McLachlan) from 2000.

Abereiddy was the main location for the 1961 film Fury at Smugglers' Bay, starring Peter Cushing. Abereiddy and the ice cream van that regularly visits were also the subject of a short promotional film called "Ice Cream" for Visit Wales, the Welsh Tourist Board, in 2009.

Additionally, Abereiddy (the Blue Lagoon) was featured in the 2024 short film 'Walk Upon The Water', which was written, directed, produced and edited by 12 Nottingham Trent film students. The film was entered into several film festivals.

== Geology and fossils ==
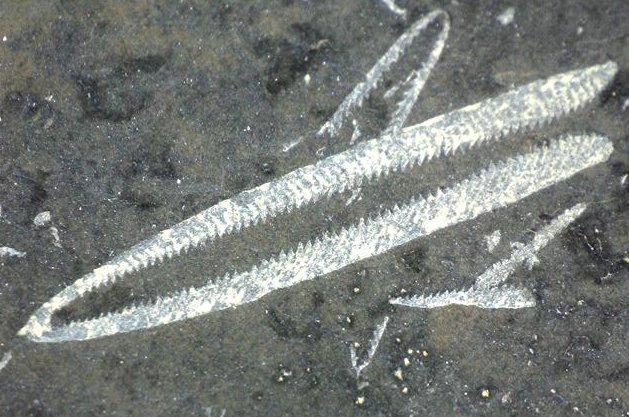
Didymograptus murchisoni

The south side of Abereiddy Bay consists of steeply dipping beds from the Upper Llanvirn, where Didymograptus murchisoni is quite common. To the north, the succession passes up into beds of Llandeilo age, and ultimately the foreshore which consists of alternating beds of Caradocian limestone and shale. North over the northern headland, there is a small cove eroded in up-faulted Didymograptus bifidus beds. This is a fault and the disused Porth Gain Slate Quarry provides excellent exposures.

Fossil collectors tend to look out for the Ordovician shales wedged in between the cliffs. Fortunately, chunks of shale regularly fall out of the cliffs onto the beach. Consequently, fossil collecting is easier done by walking down onto the beach and looking for the soft, flaky shales. Hammering is only required to split open larger pieces.
