= Llech Ronw =

Llech Ronw, or the Slate of Gronw, is a holed stone located along Afon Bryn Saeth (a tributary of Afon Cynfal) in Blaenau Ffestiniog, Wales. The stone is described as being roughly forty inches by thirty inches with a hole of about an inch in diameter going through it.

== History ==
A stone resembling the mythical Llech Ronw was discovered by Frank Ward in 1934 on the bank of Afon Cynfal. It was believed to have washed downstream from Ceunant Coch, where a local woman recalled seeing it previously. Around the turn of the 21st century, a stone similar to Llech Ronw (possibly the same one found in 1934) was discovered along Afon Bryn Saeth. Today, the modern Llech Ronw stands on a farmstead known as Bryn Saeth, or the Hill of the Arrow.

== Role in mythology ==
In the Fourth Branch of the Mabinogi (the story of Math ap Mathonwy), Lleu Llaw Gyffes is betrayed by his wife, Blodeuedd, when she elopes with Gronw Pebyr. Blodeuedd and Gronw plot to kill Lleu, and while Lleu is on the bank of Afon Cynfael, Gronw hurls a spear at him. Lleu is deeply wounded and flees in the shape of an eagle.

Gronw and Blodeuwedd.

At the end of the tale, Lleu seeks recompense from Gronw for the attempted murder. Thus Lleu and Gronw end up once again on opposite banks of Afon Cynfal, only this time Lleu is preparing to throw a spear at Gronw. However, before Lleu can do away with his opponent, Gronw asks for a stipulation.

Then Gronw Pebyr said to Lleu, ‘Lord, since I did what I did to you through the maliciousness of a woman, I beg of you for God’s sake let me put the stone I see there on the bank between me and the blow.’
‘God knows,’ said Lleu, ‘I won’t refuse you that.’

Yet the stone does not stop Lleu’s spear, which goes right through it, killing Gronw.

And Gronw Pebyr died, and the stone is there still on the bank of the Cynfael in Ardudwy, with the hole through it. Because of that it is called Gronw’s Stone.

Llech Ronw, given its appearance and location, is thought to be the stone here described as Gronw’s Stone.

In lieu of the mythological nature of Llech Ronw, the name of the farmstead where it now stands, Bryn Saeth (Hill of the Arrow), as well as the name of the nearby farmstead, Llech Goronwy (Goronwy’s Slate). In addition, there is another hill in the area called Bryn Cyfergyd, which may be the Bryn Cygergyr (Hill of Battle) of the Mabinogi and thus the hill from which Gronw threw his spear while attempting to kill Lleu.

== Role in popular culture ==
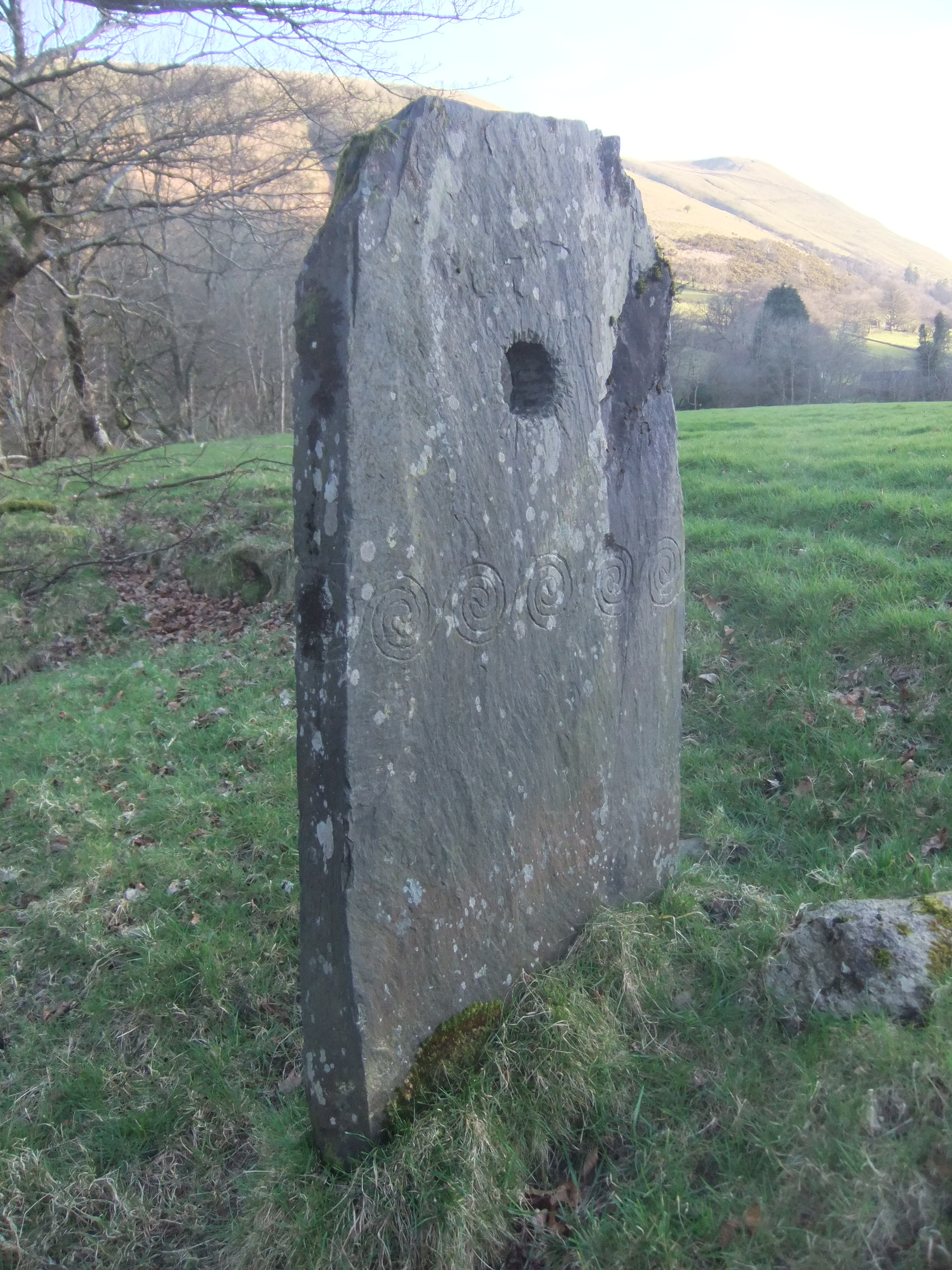
The Owl Service 'Stone of Gronw'

The story of Lleu Llaw Gyffes, Blodeuedd and Gronw Pebyr was the inspiration of Alan Garner's 1967 novel The Owl Service. Garner adapted his novel for Granada Television in 1969. The Owl Service TV series was filmed in many of the locations mentioned in the novel. For the filming a replica of Llech Ronw was carved by local stone mason Edward Rowlands from a brief by Granada Television's chief designer Peter Caldwell: "An upright piece of slab stone or slate (like a gatepost) with a 4" dia rough hole cut through it 1'.0" from the top and a roughly etched grooved pattern of circles 2'.0" from the top. The stone should be 5'.00" above the ground and 2".0 below. The stone should be very rough and weather-worn and will represent an ancient monument".

After the production was finished the stone was left in situ by the River Dovey. Rowlands later added his name to the carving so that his work would not be mistaken for an ancient monument.
