= Croes-goch =

Village in Pembrokeshire, Wales

Coordinates: 51.92°N 5.17°W

Croesgoch
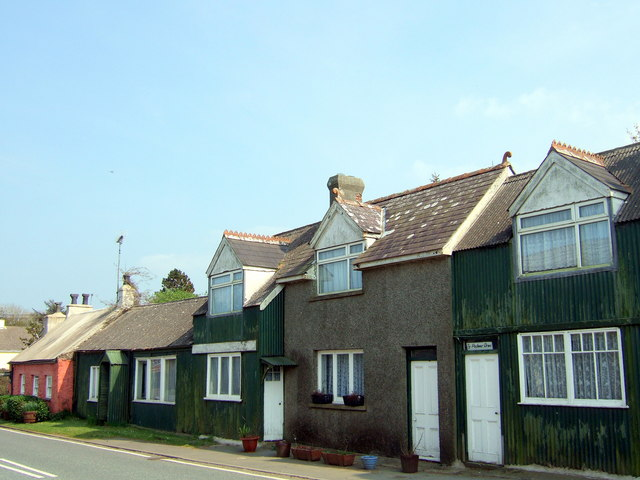
- Cottages in Croes-goch

- Location within Pembrokeshire
- Population: 400
- OS grid reference: SM8230
- Community: Llanrhian
- Principal area: Pembrokeshire
- Preserved county: Dyfed
- Country: Wales
- Sovereign state: United Kingdom
- Post town: HAVERFORDWEST
- Postcode district: SA62
- Dialling code: 01348
- Police: Dyfed-Powys
- Fire: Mid and West Wales
- Ambulance: Welsh
- UK Parliament: Preseli Pembrokeshire
- Senedd Cymru – Welsh Parliament: Preseli Pembrokeshire

Croes-goch (also spelled Croesgoch) is a village in North Pembrokeshire, West Wales. It is situated on the A487 between Fishguard and St David's. It lies some five miles northeast of St Davids on the junction of the A487 St Davids to Fishguard road with the B4330 Llanrhian to Haverfordwest. The village, which has a population of about 400, lies within Llanrhian Community Council and lies two miles south of the Pembrokeshire Coast National Park.

== History ==
There are a number of ancient burial mounds in the general vicinity and a previous site of a windmill. An old private tollgate still stands and is now used as a holiday cottage. Croesgoch lies on one of the pilgrimage routes to St David's cathedral. Nearby, at Mesur-y-Dorth, a specially carved stone, indicates a spot where people shared their bread before the last stage of their journey.

The name of the village is thought to originate from a battle which occurred near the village and resulted in a slaughter and a mythical river of blood that formed a cross - Croes-Goch. The oldest archaeological remains that have been found in the village is a cist burial tomb carbon dated c 500 AD unearthed during building work.

The Baptist Chapel, which is situated near the village centre, was built in 1858 and played a crucial role in village life. Nearby, churches include Llanrhian and Llanhywel.

On an 1842 Tithe Map shows only a small group of three or so cottages, with a building designated as a Chapel. Similarly, the 1841 census shows only a small group of three cottages.

Over the years the village has grown with building mainly taking place on the Llanrhian, Abereiddi and Trefeigan roads.

== The modern village ==
The village now has various amenities, including a bilingual primary school, a chapel, an art gallery (dedicated to the work of John Knapp Fisher), a garage, a large farm store, the Artramont Arms pub, and a beauty salon.

The Croesgoch exchange was the first in North Pembrokeshire to have broadband enabled back in April 2004.

== Culture ==
The Croesgoch Garden Show committee organises the annual show which takes place at the school. This has been running for 65 years. Other events include a Heritage Group that meets every month & is twinned with Charleville history society in Co Cork, Ireland, the Women’s Institute, carol singing, the nearby church fete in Llanrhian which takes place in August and Llanhywel Church Strawberry Fayre in late July and local women come together to recite poetry. Every year in the month of June a vintage tractor run is held in Croesgoch and it attracts much local interest. The leading painter John Knapp Fisher lived and worked here in Trevigan Gallery until his death in 2015. The gallery is still open selling prints of his work. A specialist bakery is due to open in 2019 in part of Farm Stores.
