= Tomen y Mur =

Roman fort in Gwynedd, Wales

- Gwynedd, Wales, UK
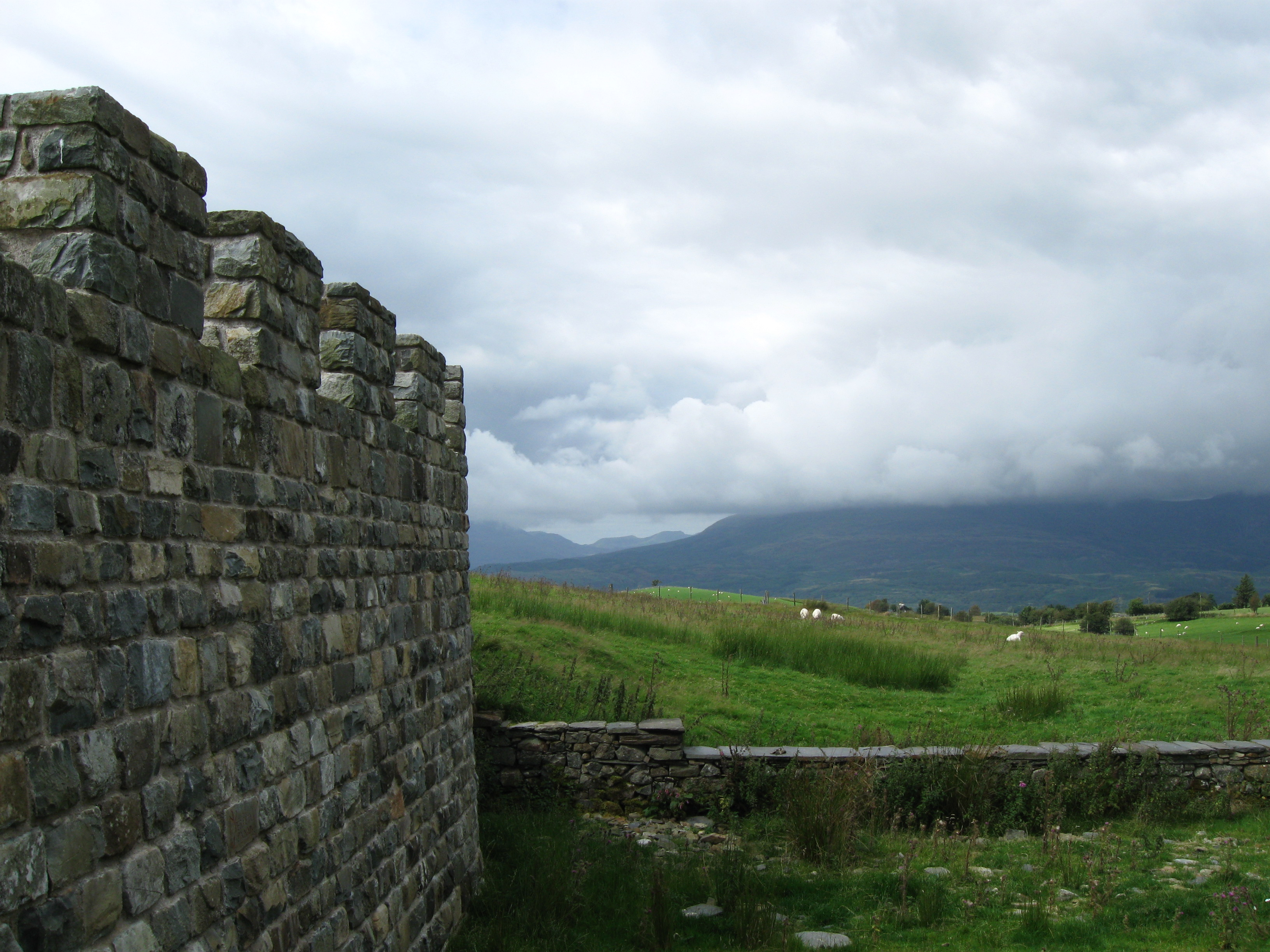
- Reconstructed wall at the northwestern corner of the fort

Location
- Location in Gwynedd
- Coordinates: 52.9299°N 3.9268°W
- Grid reference: SH705386

Tomen y Mur is a Roman fort in Snowdonia, Gwynedd, Wales, dating to the first century AD. The fortification, which lies on the slope of an isolated spur northeast of Llyn Trawsfynydd, was constructed during the North Wales campaigns of governor Gnaeus Julius Agricola in AD 78. The fort stood adjacent to the Roman road known as Sarn Helen. It was occupied until it was abandoned around AD 140. In the 11th century, the Normans reused part of the site for a motte.

Tomen y Mur, which is managed by Snowdonia National Park Authority, is a scheduled monument.

== Toponym ==
Tomen y Mur is the Welsh name for the site which means "mound of the wall"; as it is an allusion to Norman Motte that stands within the remains of the Roman embankments, hence cannot be earlier than the 11th century. As no written references about the site have survived, the fort's Roman name is unknown.

== History ==
According to Tacitus, the native Celtic tribe of Ordovices aggressively resisted Roman occupation of their territory in central and Northwest Wales. Alongside the Silures, they fought a bitter guerrilla war under the leadership of Caratacus during the AD 50s. Shortly before Agricola's governorship began in AD 78, the Ordovices were still actively resisting and had massacred an entire regiment of Roman Cavalry based in their territory. Agricola's response – part of his overall conquest of Wales – was so brutal that Tacitus tells us that the Ordovices were effectively wiped out.

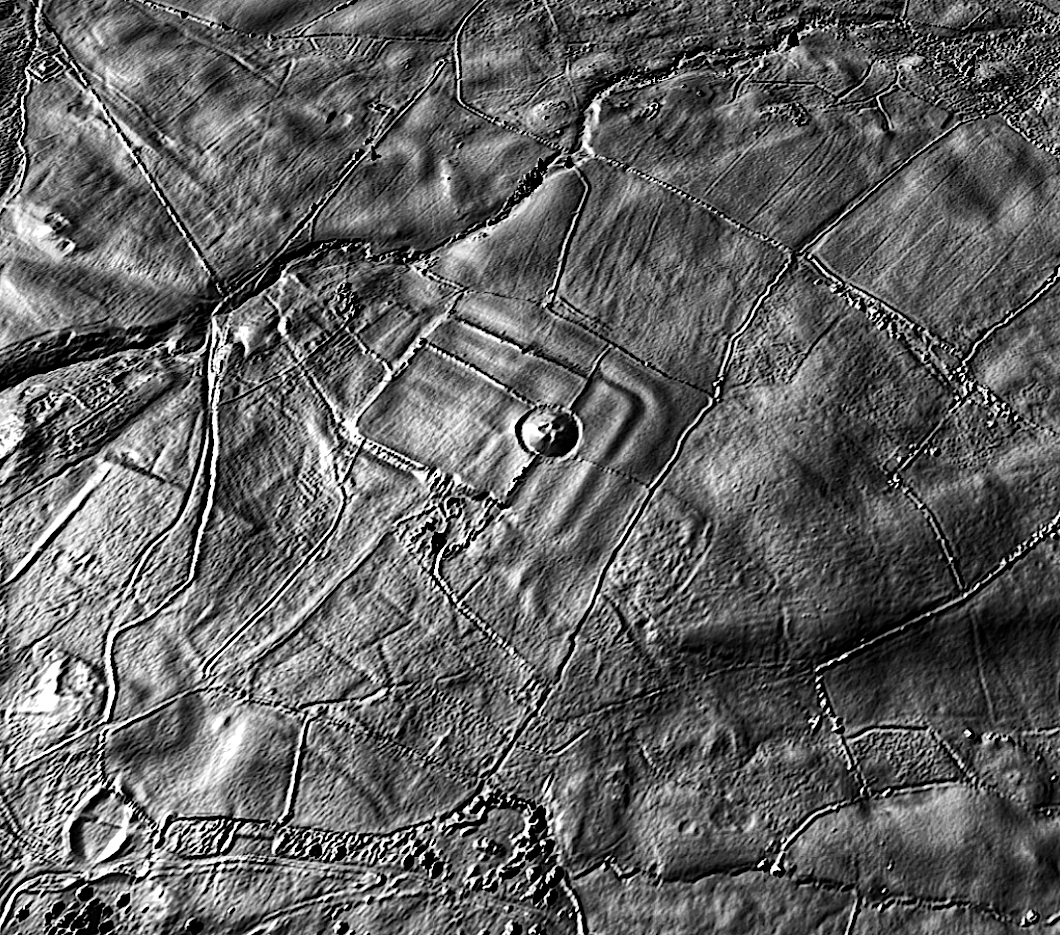
A lidar view of Tomen y Mur Roman Fort and Norman Motte.

Tomen y Mur was probably built to maintain Roman authority over the area following Agricola's campaigns. Its purpose was to oversee the local populations and protect road communications. The fort, which was first built from raised earthworks and timber, probably housed a cavalry unit of 1000 mounted troops. In the early 2nd century, the fort's personnel was reduced in size and rebuilt in stone to accommodate 500 infantry. The rebuilding work suggests the military situation was stabilising and that legionaries had settled down into a garrison role, so much so that roughly 30 years later the fort was abandoned.

Inscribed stones, found at Harlech Castle and believed to be from Tomen y Mur, document the rebuilding of the fort in stone. Each stone commemorates, in paces, various lengths of completed fortress wall and the units (Centuria) who built them. Some of these Centurial Stones were on display at the now closed Segontium museum, Caernarfon. A section of the 2nd-century curtain wall has recently been reconstructed to give an impression of how the defences may once have looked.

== Sub-Roman Wales ==
The site is important in Welsh mythology; it is the legendary palace of Ardudwy (Mur-y-Castell) in the fourth branch of the Mabinogi. Dominating the site today is a Norman era motte. Little is known about the fortification, but it is possible that it was constructed in 1095 by William Rufus in his attempt to conquer Wales.

== Archaeological research ==
The fort's remains are extensive with many ancillary features being traceable as earthworks outside the fort: a parade ground, bath house, mansio (Inn), roads, burial mounds, a possible temple and a small military amphitheatre (Ludus) – a rare feature in Britain. It has been speculated that the arena was built to compensate the legionaries for such a bleak posting, but it is also possible that the fort's very isolation allowed its preservation; many auxiliary forts having had their own arenas erased by ploughing, etc.

== Bibliography ==
- "Cornelius Tacitus, the Life of Cnæus Julius Agricola, chapter 18".
- Barnwell, E. L. (1871). "Tomen y Mur". Archaeologia Cambrensis. ii (Fourth ed.). Cambrian Archaeological Association: 194–196.
- Davies, J. L.; Jones, Rebecca H. (2006). Roman Camps in Wales and the Marches. University of Wales Press. ISBN 978-0-7083-2079-2.
- Grover, J. W. (September 1871). "Heririmons or Castell Tomen-Y-Mur". Journal of the British Archaeological Association. 27 (3): 277–282. doi:10.1080/00681288.1871.11887577.
- Ling, Roger (2010). "Amphitheatres in Britain". The Classical Review. 60 (1): 282–284. doi:10.1017/S0009840X09991405. ISSN 0009-840X. JSTOR 40600942.
- Wiles, John; Driver, Tony (2008). "Coflein - Tomen-y-Mur". coflein.gov.uk. RCAHMW.
