= Porthgain =

Village in Pembrokeshire, Wales

Coordinates: 51.948°N 5.181°W

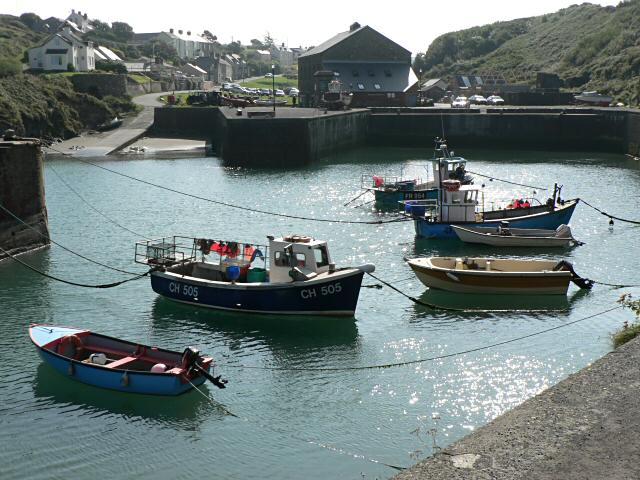
- Porthgain Harbour

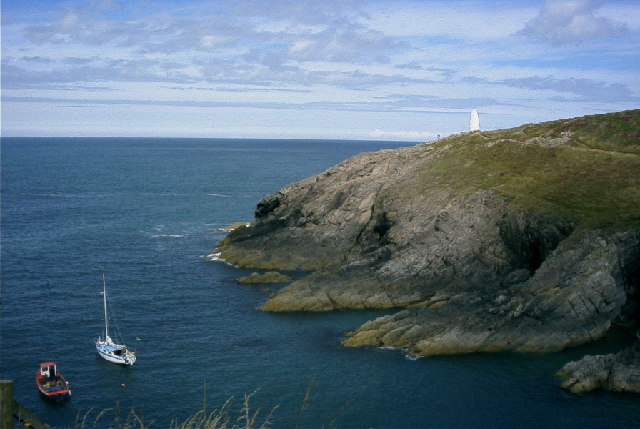
- Sea view

- Location within Pembrokeshire
- Population: 897
- OS grid reference: SM813323
- Community: Llanrhian
- Principal area: Pembrokeshire
- Country: Wales
- Sovereign state: United Kingdom
- Post town: HAVERFORDWEST
- Postcode district: SA62
- Dialling code: 01348
- Police: Dyfed-Powys
- Fire: Mid and West Wales
- Ambulance: Welsh
- UK Parliament: Ceredigion Preseli
- Senedd Cymru – Welsh Parliament: Preseli Pembrokeshire

Porthgain (Welsh for 'fair/beautiful port' or more likely 'chisel port' from the Welsh 'porth' meaning port and 'gaing' meaning chisel as used by the many slate workers there after the port was built and became operational in the early 19th century') is a hamlet in the Pembrokeshire Coast National Park in South Wales, located between St David's and Goodwick just west of the village of Llanrhian, and in the parish of the same name.

== History and amenities ==
The village of Porthgain has historical relics from its time as a prosperous industrial harbour in the early 1900s.

At one time, the harbour exported slate from Porthgain quarry works as well as quarries a few miles south at Abereiddi and Trwynllwyd. Abereiddi and the quarries to the South were linked by a tramway, the Porthgain Railway. Water-powered mills at Porthgain sawed the quarried slate slabs before shipment.

In later years the slate trade was abandoned, although Porthgain survived by turning to brickmaking, and later to crushed roadstone. Large brick hoppers dominate the harbour. These hoppers were used to store crushed dolerite before shipment and are now a Scheduled Ancient Monument. Slate, from a local quarry, was handled through the harbour from 1850 to 1910. Bricks were made in the harbour area from 1889 to 1912 using waste from the slate operation. The crushed dolerite (1889–1931) was used as a road stone.

In the 1980s Porthgain was designated as a conservation area and the industrial properties and land were purchased by local residents and the Pembrokeshire Coast National Park Authority.

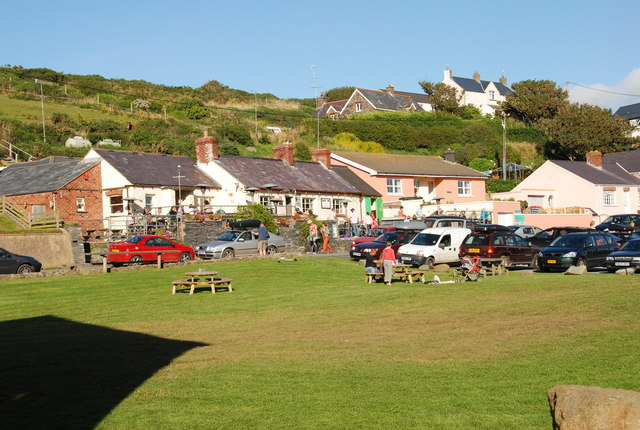

The harbour, still home to local fishermen, can get very busy in the summer with recreational boaters. Locally caught crab and lobster are available to buy from “The red house” opposite the road into Porthgain. Other attractions and conveniences include the Pembrokeshire Coast Path rambling up both sides of the harbour, the “Strumble Shuttle” bus, and the Sloop, which used to be called the “Step In” when boats were able to dock beside the pub and the crews could step in. Porthgain also has the Shed , a small bistro situated by the Quay and the Harbour Lights Gallery, which is located in the manager's office of the old works.

Porthgain Kayak Club operates voyages from the harbour during the summer months.

== Notable people ==
- Sir George Ruthven Le Hunte GCMG (1852–1925), politician, Governor of South Australia (1903–1909), was born at Porthgain.

== See also ==
- Porthgain Railway
