= 1861 in Wales =

- Centuries: 17th; 18th; 19th; 20th; 21st
- Decades: 1840s; 1850s; 1860s; 1870s; 1880s
- See also: List of years in Wales; Timeline of Welsh history 1861 in The United Kingdom Scotland Elsewhere

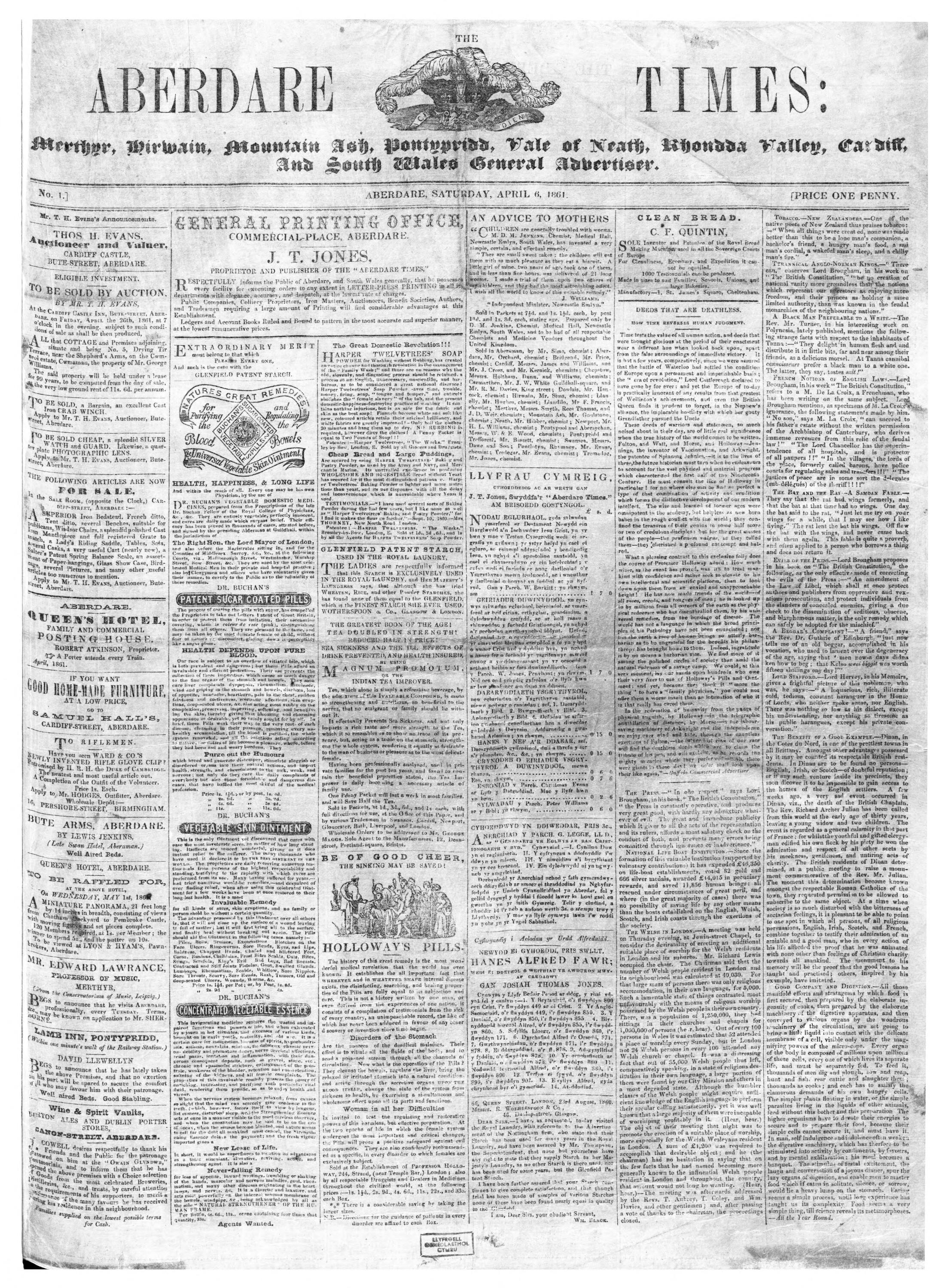
Front page of the earliest surviving copy of the Welsh newspaper Aberdare Times, published April 6, 1861

This article is about the particular significance of the year 1861 to Wales and its people.

== Incumbents ==
- Lord Lieutenant of Anglesey – Henry Paget, 2nd Marquess of Anglesey
- Lord Lieutenant of Brecknockshire – John Lloyd Vaughan Watkins
- Lord Lieutenant of Caernarvonshire – Sir Richard Williams-Bulkeley, 10th Baronet
- Lord Lieutenant of Cardiganshire – Edward Pryse
- Lord Lieutenant of Carmarthenshire – John Campbell, 2nd Earl Cawdor (from 26 April)
- Lord Lieutenant of Denbighshire – Robert Myddelton Biddulph
- Lord Lieutenant of Flintshire – Sir Stephen Glynne, 9th Baronet
- Lord Lieutenant of Glamorgan – Christopher Rice Mansel Talbot
- Lord Lieutenant of Merionethshire – Robert Davies Pryce
- Lord Lieutenant of Monmouthshire – Capel Hanbury Leigh (until 28 September);Benjamin Hall, 1st Baron Llanover (from 9 November)
- Lord Lieutenant of Montgomeryshire – Thomas Hanbury-Tracy, 2nd Baron Sudeley
- Lord Lieutenant of Pembrokeshire – Sir John Owen, 1st Baronet (until 6 February); William Edwardes, 3rd Baron Kensington (from 28 April)
- Lord Lieutenant of Radnorshire – John Walsh, 1st Baron Ormathwaite
- Bishop of Bangor – James Colquhoun Campbell
- Bishop of Llandaff – Alfred Ollivant
- Bishop of St Asaph – Thomas Vowler Short
- Bishop of St Davids – Connop Thirlwall

== Events ==
- 30 May - In a by-election caused by the death of the sitting MP, Richard Grosvenor becomes MP for Flintshire, holding it on behalf of the Liberals.
- 10 June - The Oswestry and Newtown Railway is completed throughout by opening of the section between Abermule and Newtown, giving through rail communication from England to Llanidloes.
- July - Baner ac Amserau Cymru begins twice-weekly publication.
- date unknown
  - Excavation of Long Hole Cave in Glamorgan reveals prehistoric flint artefacts.
  - Pryce Pryce-Jones starts his mail order company in Newtown, Montgomeryshire.
  - John Dillwyn-Llewelyn marries Caroline, daughter of Sir Michael Hicks Beach, 8th Baronet.
  - Griffith John becomes the first Christian missionary to penetrate into central China.

== Arts and literature ==
=== Awards ===
- 20–22 August - The first National Eisteddfod of Wales is held at Aberdare. The chair is won by Lewis William Lewis.

=== New books ===
- Autobiography and Correspondence of Mrs. Delaney, ed. Augusta Hall, Lady Llanover
- Griffith Jones (Glan Menai) - Hywel Wyn
- John Jones (Vulcan) - Athrawiaeth yr Iawn
- David Owen (Brutus) - Cofiant y Diweddar Barch. Thomas Williams
- Thomas Rees - History of Protestant Nonconformity in Wales: From Its Rise to the Present Time
- William Rees (Gwilym Hiraethog) - Emmanuel
- Jane Williams (Ysgafell) - The Literary Women of England
- Robert Williams (Trebor Mai) - Fy Noswyl

=== Music ===
- Hugh Jerman - Deus Misereatur

== Sport ==
- Cricket
  - 18 July - South Wales Cricket Club defeat MCC at Lord's.

== Births ==
- 1 January - John Owen Jones (Ap Ffarmwr), journalist (died 1899)
- 2 January (in Oswestry) - William Henry Griffith Thomas, clergyman and academic (died 1924)
- 28 February - Jessie Penn-Lewis, evangelist (died 1927)
- 22 March - Dick Kedzlie, Wales international rugby player (died 1920)
- 7 April - Clara Novello Davies, singer (died 1943)
- 5 May - John Edward Lloyd, historian (died 1947)
- 31 July at Garneddwen - Alfred W. Hughes, surgeon and founder of the Welsh Hospital in South Africa
- 27 August - Reginald Brooks-King, archer (died 1936)
- 10 September - Sir John Lynn-Thomas, surgeon (died 1939)
- 19 September - Evan Roberts, Wales international rugby player (died 1927)
- 26 October - Richard Griffith (Carneddog), writer (died 1947)
- 28 December - David Gwynn, Wales international rugby player (died 1897)
- date unknown
  - William Stadden, rugby player (died 1906)
  - John Williams, politician (died 1922)

== Deaths ==
- 6 February - Sir John Owen, 1st Baronet, 84
- 20 April - David Pugh, merchant, landowner and politician,
- 8 May - Thomas Lloyd-Mostyn, politician, 31
- 17 May - Ellis Owen Ellis, artist, 48?
- 2 August - Sidney Herbert, 1st Baron Herbert of Lea, statesman, 50
- 5 September - William Addams Williams, lawyer, landowner and politician, 74
- 26 September - Morris Davies (Meurig Ebrill), poet, 71
- 25 October - Sir James Graham, 2nd Baronet, former MP for Pembroke, 69

== See also ==
- 1861 in Ireland
