= Aberllefenni railway station =

Closed railway station in Wales

Coordinates: 52.5959°N 3.8549°W

Aberllefenni
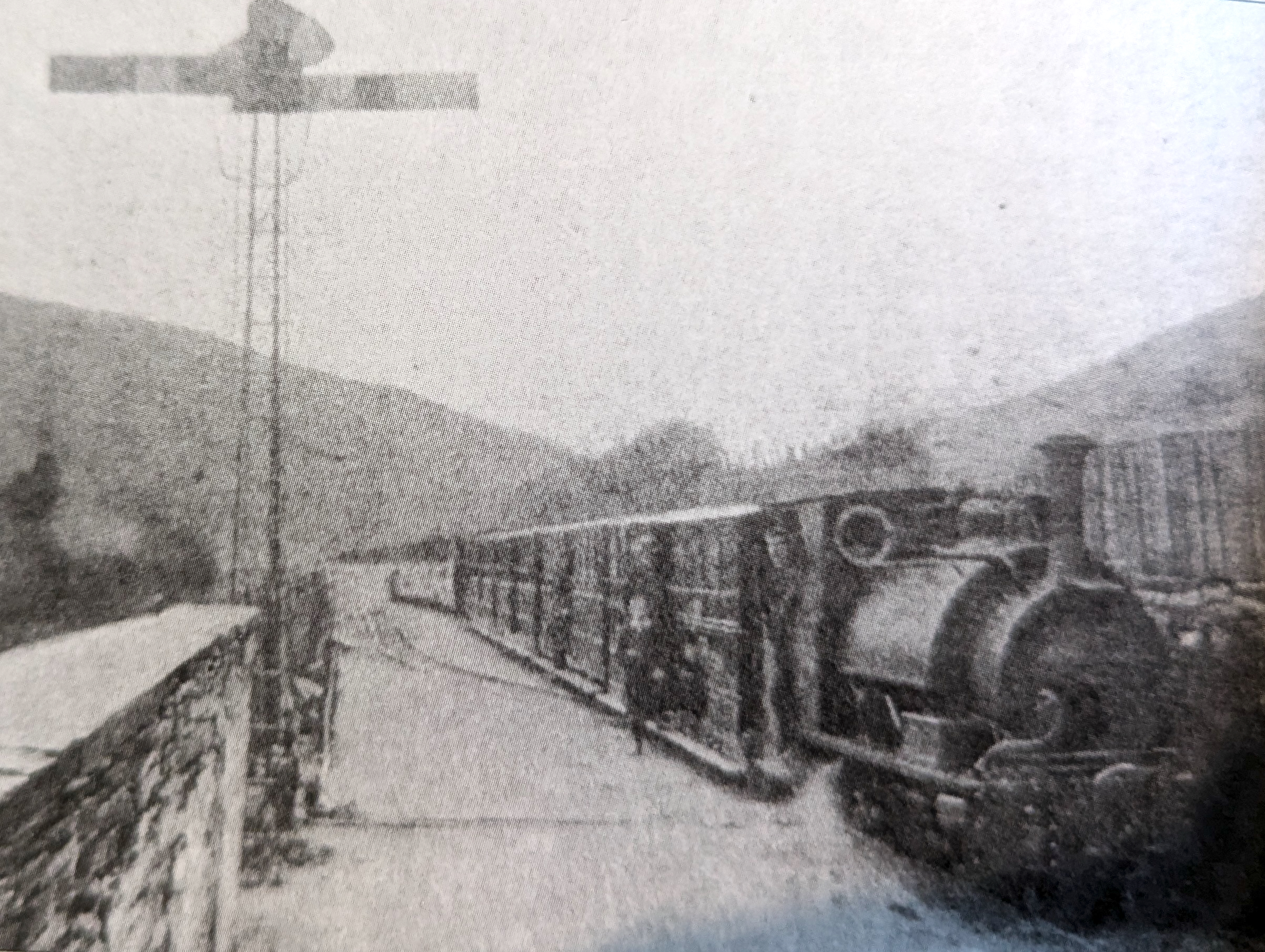
- A train at Aberllefenni in c. 1897 showing the loop south of the platform

General information
- Location: Wales

Other information
- Status: Closed

History
- Pre-grouping: Corris Railway
- Post-grouping: Great Western Railway (after 1930)

Key dates
- 1887: Opened to passengers
- 1931: Closed to passengers
- 1948: Closed to freight
Location

Aberllefenni was a station on the Corris Railway in Merioneth (now Gwynedd), Wales. It was opened in 1887 as the northern passenger terminus of the railway. It closed to passengers in 1931, and to all traffic in 1948.

== History ==
The Corris Railway (originally called the Corris Machynlleth and River Dovey Tramroad) opened in 1858, connecting the slate quarries around Corris and Aberllefenni with river wharves at Derwenlas and Morben. The tramroad started at the "engine house" (i.e., slate mill) at the Aberllefenni quarry, to the north of the eventual station site.

Passengers were carried on the Corris from around 1860, and a timetabled service was introduced in October 1874. The early services appear to have run between Machynlleth Town and Corris though the quarry trains on to Aberllefenni and Ratgoed may well have carried workers on an informal basis.

The railway was upgraded for steam locomotives in 1878, though steam-hauled passenger services did not start until 1883. Initially these ran from Machynlleth to Corris. In 1887, a new station was opened at Aberllefenni, and passenger trains terminated there until the end of passenger trains on the line in 1931.

== Location ==
The station was sited on a thin sliver of land next to the road into the village. The station building was unusually narrow to fit in the available land, and there wasn't enough room to put a passing loop next to the low slate platform. Instead, a loop was built immediately south of the platform, which required locomotives to make extra shunting operations to run round their trains. The passing loop had an inspection pit.

The line north of the station was gated - this marked the boundary between the locomotive-operated railway and the Ratgoed Tramway and quarry branches beyond. The track split at a single-bladed point just beyond, with the left branch passing behind Pensarn - the main set of cottages in the village - and on to the Ratgoed quarry. The right branch crossed the road and ran down to the village mill and beyond to the Aberllefenni quarries.

== After closure ==
The site of the station on the left, in 1999

The Ratgoed tramway continued in use until 1952, and parts of the Aberllefenni quarry tramway were used until the Foel Grochan mine closed in 2003.

The station building gradually deteriorated after the closure of the Corris Railway, though it survived until at least 1962. In 1964 the station site was purchased by the Forestry Commission and the remains of the building were offered to the nascent railway society on the condition that they removed it, but this offer was not taken up.

Roadworks providing access to the houses of Maes-yr-Orsaf have utilised some of the station site, and the only remaining structures are the retaining wall of the station foundations, where the window and door into the cellar of the station building are visible. The slate stairs leading up to the tramway level beyond the station provided access to Rock Cottages.

| Preceding station | Disused railways | Following station |
|---|---|---|
| Garneddwen | Corris Railway | Cymerau quarry |
