= Corris railway station =

Railway station in Wales

Coordinates: 52.6536°N 3.8418°W

Corris
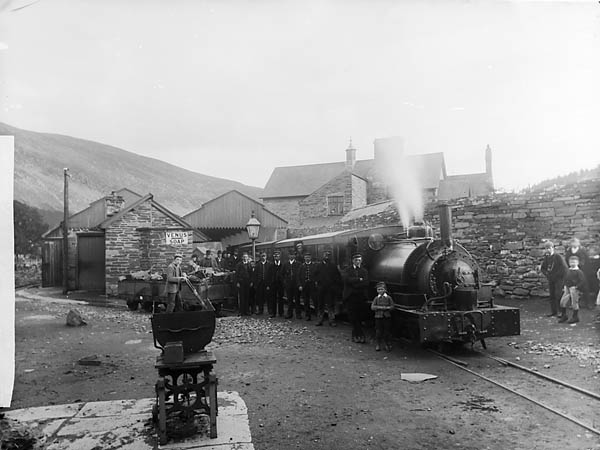
- The station in the mid-1880s

General information
- Location: Wales

Other information
- Status: Active

History
- Pre-grouping: Corris Railway
- Post-grouping: Great Western Railway (after 1930)

Key dates
- 1859: Opened to freight (horse-drawn)
- 1860: Opened to passengers
- 1931: Closed to passengers
- 1948: Closed to freight
- 1970: Corris Railway Museum opened
- 1971: Demonstration track laid
- 1985: First train of the preservation era
- 2002: Passenger services restored

Corris is a station on the Corris Railway in Merioneth (now Gwynedd), Wales. It was built in 1859 when the railway was first opened as the Corris, Machynlleth and River Dovey Tramroad and was briefly the northern terminus of the line. It closed to passengers in 1931, and to all traffic in 1948.

In 1966 what became the Corris Railway Society was formed to preserve the railway and they established a museum in the station's stable building. The railway has subsequently been relaid south to Maespoeth Junction and the first train into Corris station ran in 1985. In 2002, passenger services resumed.

== History ==
Corris village grew up at the confluence of the Deri and Dulas rivers in the 1780s to provide worker accommodation for the local slate quarries, notably Braichgoch. As the industry expanded, the village grew as did the need for better transport links to the coast. In April 1859, the Corris, Machynlleth & River Dovey Tramroad opened connecting Corris to river wharfs at Derwenlas and Morben. The section north to Aberllefenni was opened later that year.

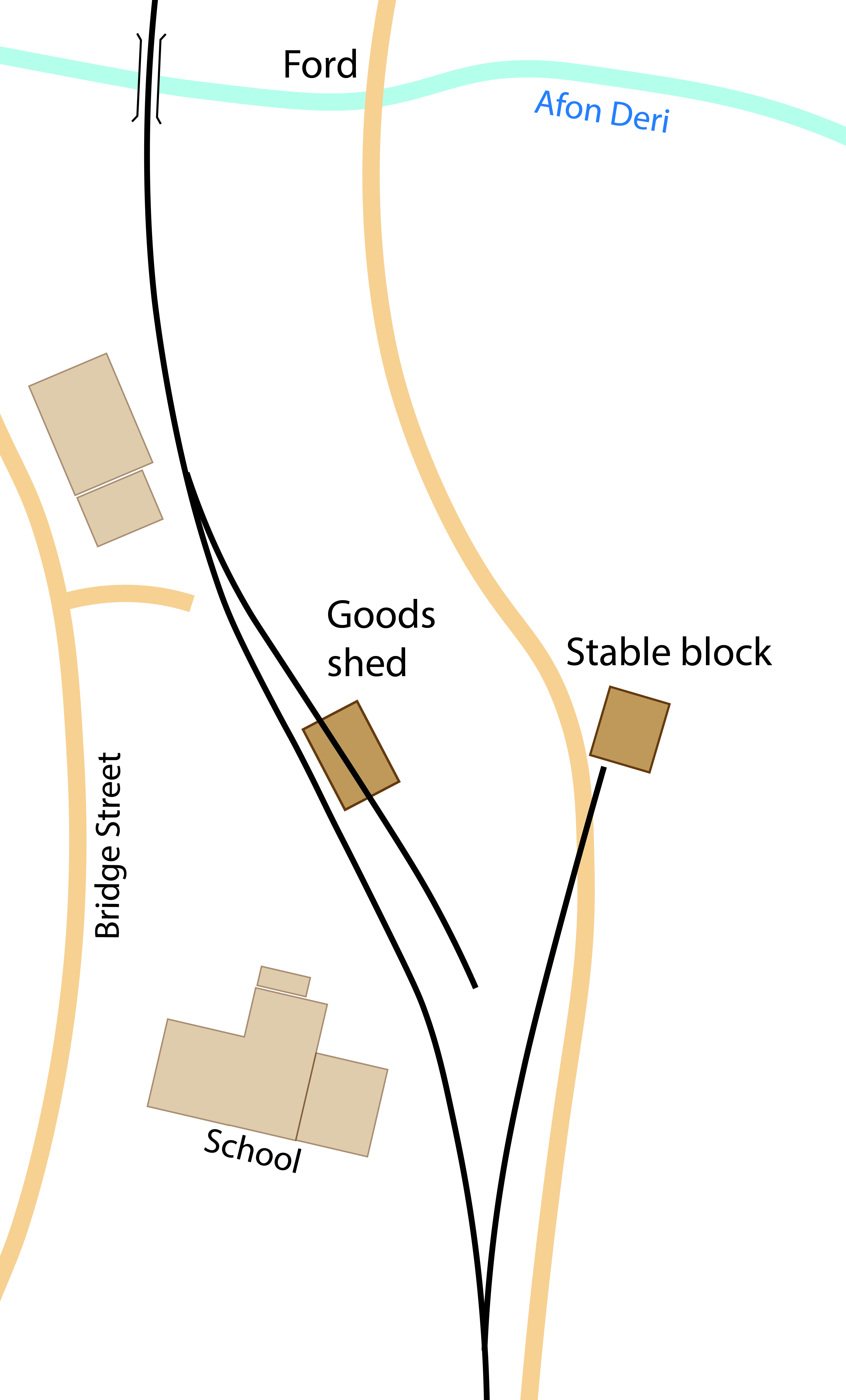
Map of Corris Railway Station in 1865

The original station consisted of two sidings, one running through a goods shed. As the tramroad was horse-hauled, there was no need for a run-round loop.

The act authorising the tramroad (27 & 28 Vict. c. ccxxv) strictly forbade the carriage of passengers, but the railway allowed informal passenger services from at least 1860, running between Machynlleth Town and Corris. Starting in 1872, separate timetabled trains were started between these stations.

In 1864 the Corris Railway Act (27 & 28 Vict. c. ccxxv) changed the name of the tramroad to the Corris Railway. In 1878, the railway was relaid using steel rails, and in December three steam locomotives and ten passenger carriages arrived from the Hughes Locomotive Company. Corris Station was completely rebuilt, adding a carriage shed and a station building with a 66 feet (20 m) long overall roof with glass canopy.

Steam-hauled passenger trains started running from Corris Station to Machynlleth in 1883 and were extended to Aberllefenni in 1887. Around 1890, a large stable building was added to the east of the station. Although the trains were by this stage entirely steam hauled, the railway ran an extensive bus services from the station using horse-hauled charabancs.

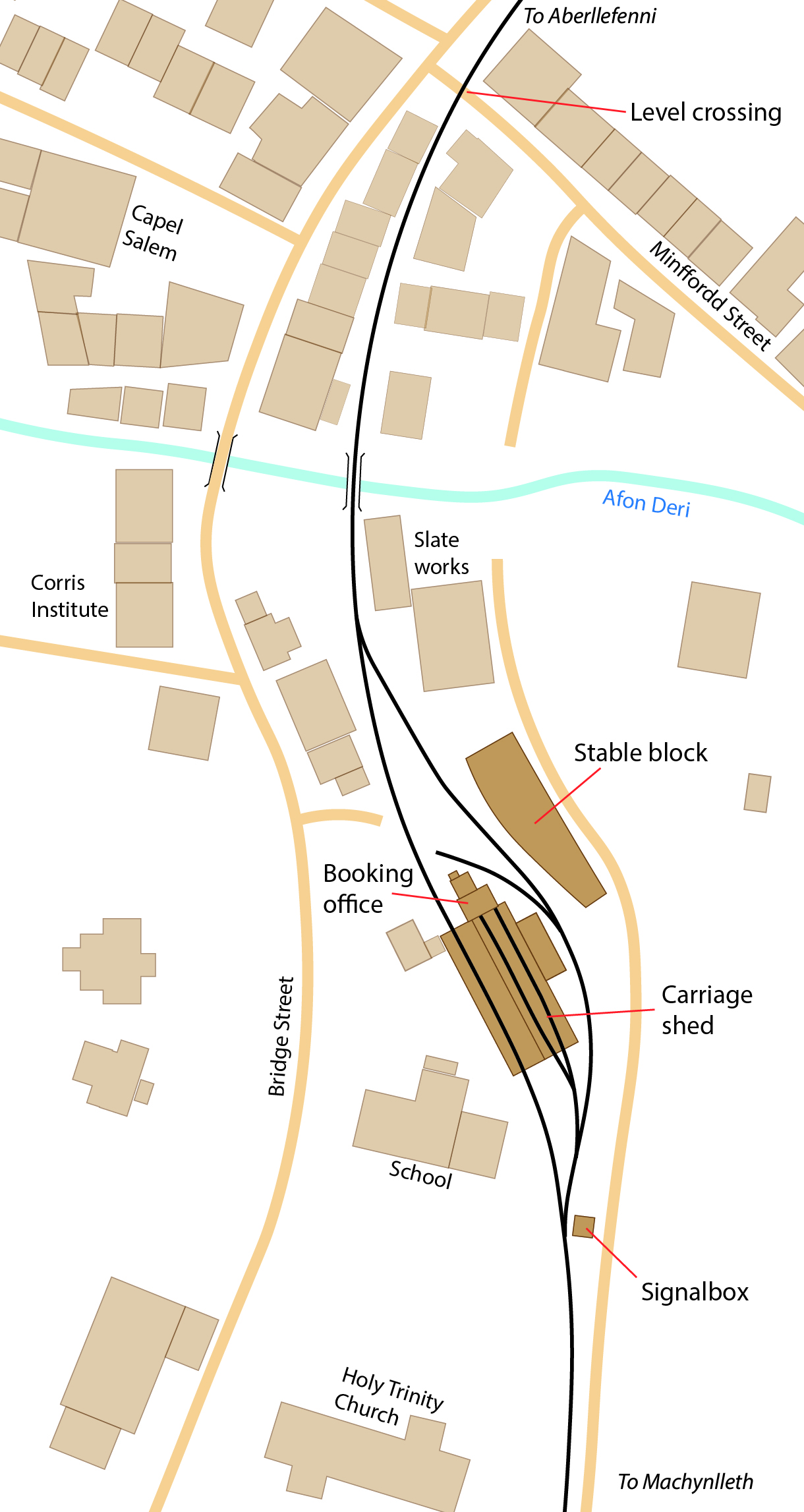
Map of Corris Railway station in the 1890s

In late 1929, the Corris Railway was purchased by the Great Western Railway (GWR), who by that time were the owners of the main line serving Machynlleth station. The GWR's main interest in the railway was its bus services, and in January 1931 the competing passenger services on the Corris Railway were withdrawn.

The station stayed open after 1931, as freight to Corris and the surrounding villages continued to arrive by the railway. On 1 January 1948, the line was nationalised, becoming part of British Railways (BR). In August 1948, following flooding of the River Dyfi, the Corris Railway closed and Corris Station with it.

== After closure ==
The station in 2006 with the siding on the left and the passenger line on the right

The station buildings continued to be used by a local coal merchant into the 1960s, though they gradually became more dilapidated and was demolished early in 1968. Shortly after the demolition, the Corris Railway Society was formed. In 1970 the Society opened a museum in the stable building, the last remaining building at the station site. They added a short demonstration track in 1971.

In 1981 the Society's acquired the line's original locomotive shed at Maespoeth Junction and this became the railway's operational base. During the 1980s light track was laid between Maespoeth and Corris station, a distance of just under a 1 mile (1.6 km). The "first train" back to Corris ran in 1985.

During the 1980s and 1990s the track was gradually improved, bringing it up to the standard required to run passenger trains. Passengers services to Corris station resumed in the summer of 2002. On 20 August 2005, the railway's newly built steam locomotive No. 7 hauled the first steam train to run into the station for 57 years.

After the station was demolished, the site was used for a doctor's surgery and car park for the village. This meant that the station could only occupy the southern quarter of the side. There was only room for a short platform with a single siding, and the railway could only operate push–pull trains with a single carriage into the station. In 2016 the then-redundant surgery building was purchased by the railway and removed.

In 2022, the station was relaid. with two lines ending in a traverser and a platform long enough for a four carriage train. This is the first stage in the redevelopment of the station which will include a building with an overall roof, inspired by the design of the 1878 station building.

Preceding station	Disused railways	Following station
Maespoeth Junction	Corris Railway	Garneddwen
