= Mary Hughes (disambiguation) =

Mary Hughes (1874–1958) was the second wife of Billy Hughes, Prime Minister of Australia.

Mary Hughes may also refer to:

- Mary Hughes (bowls), lawn bowls competitor for Wales
- Mary Hughes (British author), British author and teacher
- Mary Hughes (social worker) (1860–1941), British social worker
- Mary Beth Hughes (1919–1995), American actress
- Mary Caroline Hughes (1862–1916), English geologist, artist and photographer
- Mary Vivian Hughes (1866–1956), British author and educator

== See also ==
- Hughes (surname)
