= Maespoeth Junction =

Coordinates: 52.64461°N 3.84462°W

Maespoeth Junction is a railway station south of Corris in Gwynedd. It lies in the historic county of Merionethshire/Sir Feirionnydd, in the valley of the Afon Dulas. It was a junction on the historic Corris Railway, the site of the railway's locomotive sheds and workshop, and since 2002 a station on the preserved railway.

== Origins ==
"Maespoeth" translates as "Hot Field", and this name is shared with a nearby house.

The horse-hauled Corris Machynlleth and River Dovey Tramroad was opened in 1859, connecting the Aberllefenni quarries to river wharves at Derwenlas and Morben. In the early 1860s, the Upper Corris Tramway was built from the slate quarries around Corris Uchaf down to Maespoeth and a loop and junction was built here.

== Development of engine sheds ==
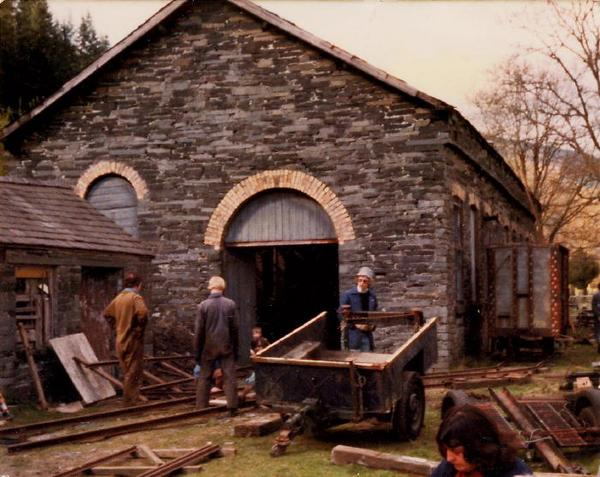
The original engine shed shortly after its return to the Corris Railway in the 1980s, and before passenger services had resumed.

The site was merely the meeting place of the two lines until 1878. In that year the Corris Railway Company identified Maespoeth as the site for its new engine shed, planned as part of the introduction of steam engines, which commenced operating later that year.

Constructed in the vee of the two lines, the new shed held the railway's three steam locomotives and was equipped to handle all but the heaviest repairs to the locomotives and rolling stock. Immediately to the north of the engine shed is a small stream. At an unknown date a section of the stream was lined with slate and a wood-framed dunny or latrine was built over it to provide toilet facilities with constant running water. Although this remains in situ it is no longer used by railway staff.

In the early 1920s the arrival of a fourth locomotive exceeded the capacity of the engine shed, and a small wooden building was built against the south wall of the engine shed and initially used to store one of the railway's original three locomotives. This building was later used to store a carriage while it was being repaired. It was demolished in the winter of 1930.

A smaller stone building was later constructed to the south of the engine shed, and used as a stable and store for the Signals & Telegraph (S&T) department. A wooden signal cabin with a stone chimney was built to protect the lever frame controlling the points and signals at the south end of the site.

Much of the engineering machinery was removed after the line became part of the Great Western Railway in 1930, but the engine shed and associated structures survived the closure of the railway in 1948 and subsequently served as a winter working base for the Forestry Commission.

== Preservation ==
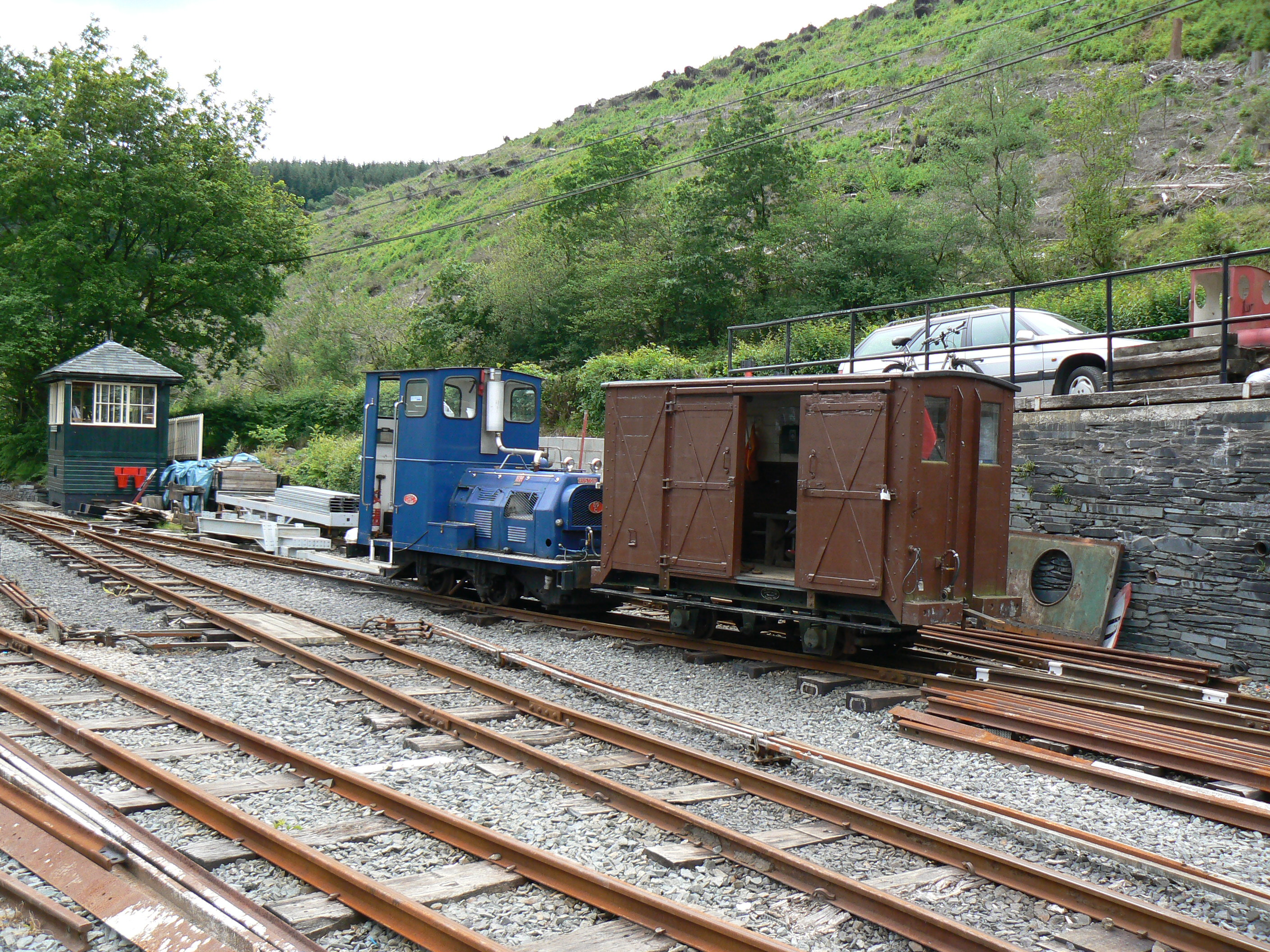
The station yard at Maespoeth Junction, with the replacement signal box in the background.

Since 1966, volunteers from the Corris Railway Society have been working on the preservation of the Corris Railway. In 1981 Maespoeth Junction was purchased by the Corris Railway Society and the engine shed now once again serves its original purpose as a home for the railway's locomotives, and as its engineering headquarters. The engine shed is a Grade II listed building, and successfully attracted a large Heritage Lottery Fund grant to fund re-roofing of both the engine shed and the associated S&T shed.

The original S&T shed to the south of the engine shed also survives, now being used as a volunteer's mess and as a small museum. Originally this building was separate from the engine shed, but the space between the two has now been roofed to provide a toilet block.

The original signal box did not survive, but a new signal box was built in the 1990s on the same site as the original. This now controls points and signals around the junction.

In 2009 a large new carriage shed, largely built by volunteers from the Corris Railway Society, was opened on the east side of the site. This building is now the headquarters of the railway's passenger carriage construction programme, as well as being a base for the overhauling of freight and engineering vehicles.

== Passenger station ==
The original railway did not have a passenger station at Maespoeth, although most up-trains halted there to take water from a pipe overhanging the track, fed from a slate water tank inside the engine shed, supplied via a cast-iron pipe from a mountain stream several hundred yards away. The heritage railway has built a platform at Maespoeth and this currently serves as the southern terminus of the partially restored line.

The station is still referred to as Maespoeth Junction, even though the Upper Corris Tramway no longer exists. The actual junction track work has been relaid, and rails have been relaid for the first hundred yards of the tramway's route, rising sharply to meet the neighbouring roadway. This last spur of the old tramway is still occasionally used as a facility for transferring engines and rolling stock to flatbed lorries for road transportation.

== Sources ==
A Return to Corris, Corris Railway Society 1988 ISBN 0 905466 89 6

Preceding station	Heritage railways	Following station
Terminus	Corris Railway	Corris
	Historical railways	
Esgairgeiliog	Corris Railway	Corris
