= Hughes Memorial =

Hughes Memorial may refer to:

- Hughes Memorial Tower in Washington, D.C.
- Alfred W. Hughes Memorial in Corris
