= Pennal =

Village in Gwynedd, Wales

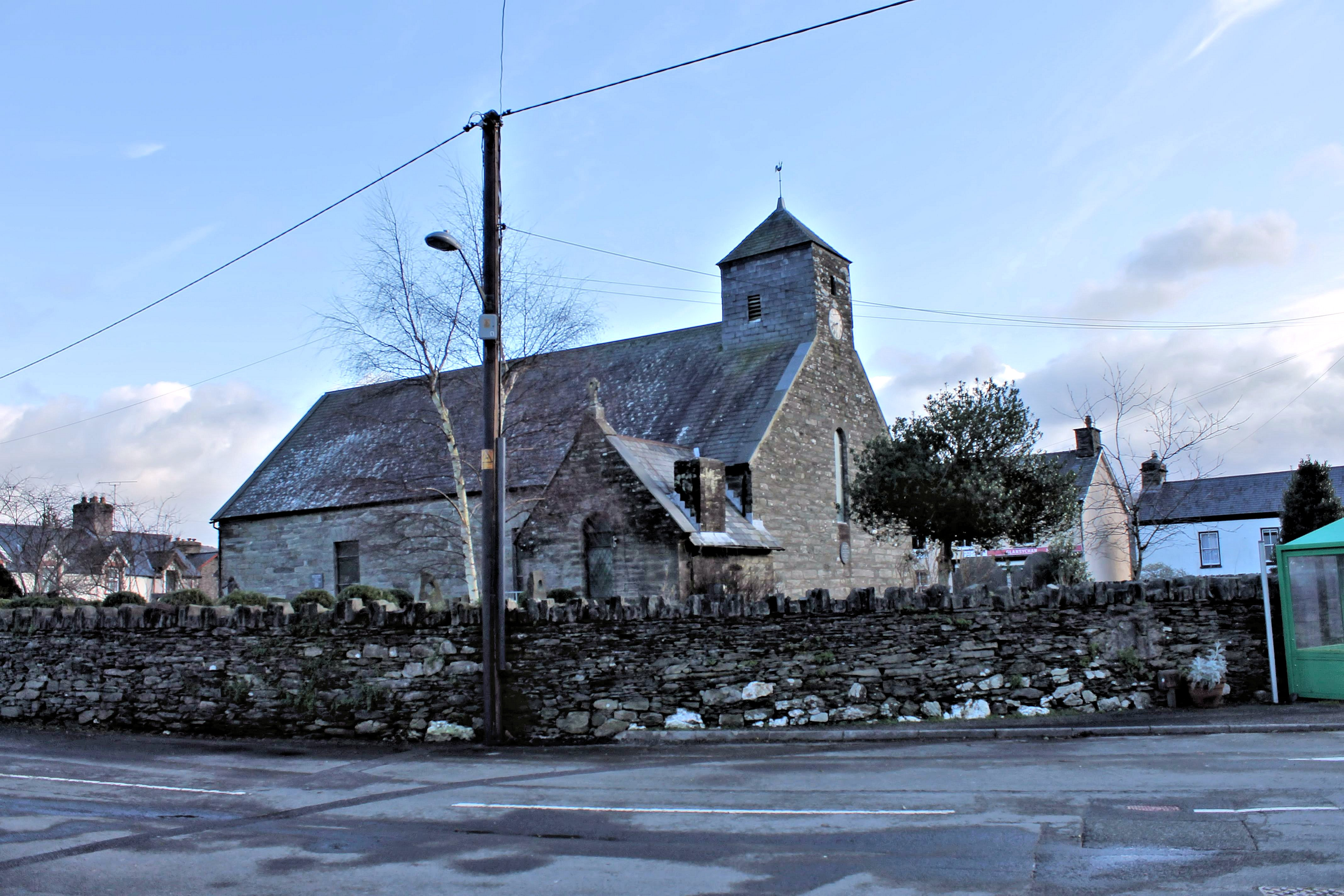
- St Peter ad Vincula church, Pennal

- Location within Gwynedd
- Population: 404 (2011)
- OS grid reference: SH699003
- Community: Pennal
- Principal area: Gwynedd
- Preserved county: Gwynedd
- Country: Wales
- Sovereign state: United Kingdom
- Post town: Machynlleth
- Postcode district: SY20
- Dialling code: 01654
- Police: North Wales
- Fire: North Wales
- Ambulance: Welsh
- UK Parliament: Dwyfor Meirionnydd
- Senedd Cymru – Welsh Parliament: Dwyfor Meirionnydd
- List of places UK Wales Gwynedd 52.585°N 3.921°W Map of the community

Pennal is a village and community on the A493 road in southern Gwynedd, Wales, on the north bank of the River Dyfi, near Machynlleth.

It lies in the historic county of Merionethshire (Welsh: Sir Feirionnydd) and is within the Snowdonia National Park.

== Roman fort ==
It was the site of a small Roman fort, known as Cefn Gaer in Welsh, probably guarding a ford or ferry crossing of the Dyfi on the Sarn Helen Roman road. The remains of the fort lie under the 14th-century house of Cefn Caer, overlooking the village.

== Owain Glyndŵr ==
Pennal is known for its historical association with Owain Glyndŵr. In Pennal Owain composed the Pennal Letter of 1406, a letter to the King of France setting out his plans for an independent Wales – the only document which stands as a policy document for an independent Wales in the Middle Ages. The letter was briefly returned to Wales from France for an exhibition at the National Library of Wales in 2000, and a campaign has started for it to be returned permanently to Wales and be put on show at the National Assembly building in Cardiff.

== Price Family of Esgair Weddan ==
Just outside Pennal is the farmstead of 'Esgair Weddan' which from the 14th century until the mid 18th was the home of the Price (ap Rhys) family of Esgair Weddan, patrilineal descendants of Dafydd ap Llywelyn, son of Llywelyn fawr (the great) Prince of Wales (1240–1246). Their home was called Plas yn y Rofft in Elizabethan times and was located in a field behind the present farmhouse above the village of Cwrt, (originally Pont y Cwrt), meaning "court", near to Mynydd Esgairweddan.

== Anwyl Family of Llugwy ==
Just outside Pennal, on the banks of the Dyfi opposite the hamlet of Morben, is "Llugwy", the home of the Anwyl family since 1682. This family have patrilinear descent from Rhodri Mawr through Anarawd, his eldest son, and Owain Gwynedd (king of Gwynedd c.1137 – 1170) to the present day.

== Recent history ==
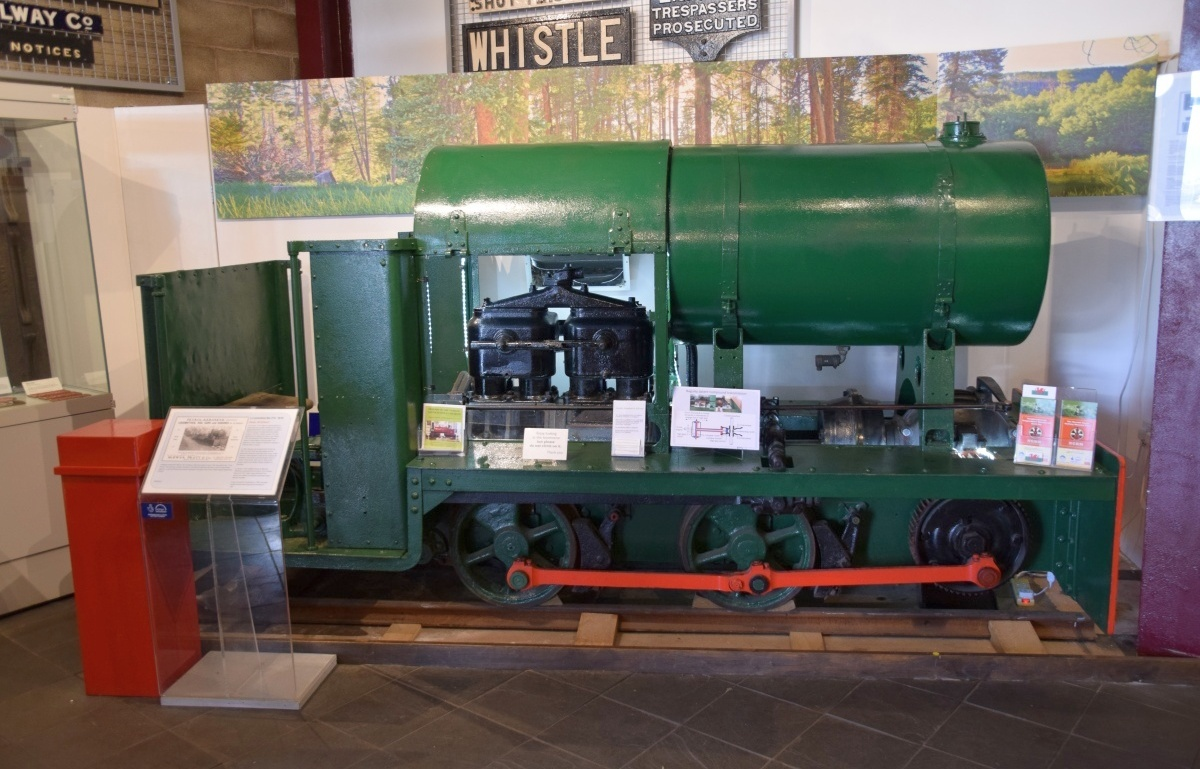
Baguley 774, which ran on the timber railway at Pennal

In the early 19th century there were quays on the Dyfi where slate from the quarries around Corris, Aberllefenni and Abergynolwyn was brought by packhorse for loading onto seagoing vessels. This trade died out when the Corris Railway to Machynlleth and the Talyllyn Railway to Tywyn were built. The Cwm Ebol quarry operated a mile north west of the village between 1868 and around 1906. A 3 ft (914 mm) gauge tramway (later converted to 2 ft (610 mm) gauge) operated between the quarry and the village. Between 1918 and 1920 part of the tramway was reused in another 2 ft (610 mm) gauge railway, serving timber felling operations at Cwm Dwr, two miles north of the village. The early internal combustion locomotive Baguley 774 was used on the line.

The village also has a place in music history, as it was at nearby Bron-Yr-Aur cottage that Robert Plant was living when he wrote the Led Zeppelin classic, "Stairway to Heaven".
