= Baguley 774 =

Experimental diesel locomotive built by Baguley

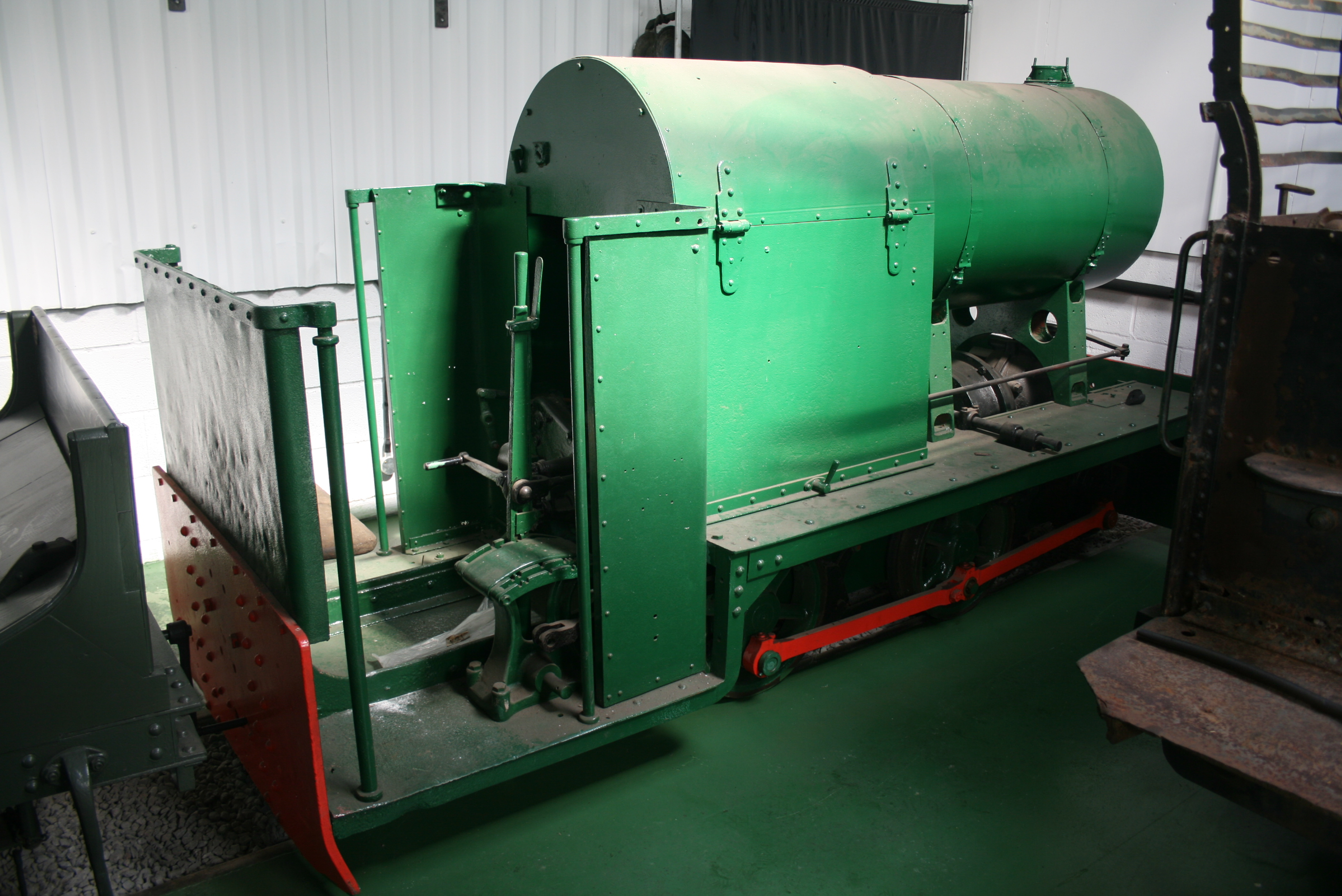
- Stored at the Statfold Barn Railway
Type and origin
- Power type: Petrol
- Builder: Baguley
- Serial number: 774
- Build date: March 1919
Specifications
- Configuration
  - Whyte: 0-4-0PM
  - UIC: B n2t
- Gauge: 2 ft (610 mm)
- Driver dia.: 1 ft 8 in (0.51 m)
- Wheelbase: 2 ft 9 in (0.84 m)
- Length: 10 ft 8 in (3.25 m)
- Width: 4 ft (1.2 m)
- Height: 5 ft 9 in (1.75 m)
- Loco weight: 6.5 long tons (7 t; 7 short tons)
Performance figures
- Tractive effort: 20 hp (15,000 W)
Career
- Operators: Timber Supply Department; Oakeley quarry
- Number in class: 6
- Withdrawn: 1937
- Preserved: 1
- Disposition: Preserved

Baguley 774 is one of the earliest surviving narrow-gauge internal combustion locomotives. It was built in 1919 for the Timber Supply Department of the Board of Trade. After a varied career, it was preserved at the Narrow Gauge Railway Museum in Tywyn.

== Industrial career ==
In early 1919, Baguley Cars Ltd began work on a class of six petrol-mechanical locomotives. These were an enlarged version of the 10hp McEwan Pratt locomotives supplied for use in the First World War. The larger design had a 20 hp engine and a larger frame and body. The first locomotive, works number 774, was completed in March 1919 and shipped to Machynlleth railway station.

The locomotive was used on the Timber Supply Department tramway at Pennal. Between 1918 and 1920 part of the 2 ft (610 mm) gauge tramway connecting to the Cwm Ebol quarry was extended to serve the timber felling operations at Cwm Dwr, two miles north of the Pennal. 774 worked on this line during 1919 and early 1920.

In 1923, the locomotive was purchased by Baguley who refurbished it and displayed it on their stand at the Commercial Motor Show in London and between 1924 and 1925 at the British Empire Exhibition at Wembley Park. In December 1926, light railway dealer J.C. Oliver & Co. of Leeds sold two Baguley locomotives to Oakeley slate quarry in Blaenau Ffestiniog; these were works numbers 708 and 779 - the latter being another example of the 20hp class which had been acquired from the Kerry Tramway. Pleased with the performance of these locomotives, Oakeley approached Oliver for a third similar locomotive. In January 1927, Oliver bought 774 from Baguley and immediately sold it to Oakeley.

In 1937, a fire at the locomotive shed at Oakeley destroyed 779 and damaged 774. The following year, 774 was walled up in the disused Upper Mill.

== Preservation ==
In 1965, railway enthusiast Rodney Weaver purchased the locomotive from the quarry company and 774 was moved down to a lower mill for storage. In June 1968, it was moved to the Wychwood Railway, a private narrow gauge line near Leamington Spa, although it did not run there. It was purchased in 1970 by Rich Morris who moved it to his house in Bampton, Oxfordshire

In 1977, Morris opened a railway museum in Oakeley quarry, called Gloddfa Ganol and 774 was moved there as an exhibit. In 1997, the museum closed and 774 was put up for auction. It was purchased by the Narrow Gauge Railway Museum, who moved it to the gunpowder shed at Tywyn Wharf railway station.

In July 2003, the locomotive was moved to the Amerton Railway for cosmetic restoration. This work was completed at the Statfold Barn Railway after 774 moved there in November 2008. It returned to Wales in November 2016, and was moved into the Narrow Gauge Railway Museum for public display.

== Technical details ==
774 has a 130 imperial gallons (590 L) water tank that looks like a steam locomotive boiler, but holds cooling water for the cylinders. A 20 imperial gallons (91 L) petrol tank sits directly above the 4 cylinder 4,120 cubic centimetres (251 cu in) engine. Coil springs on the leading axle and leaf springs on the trailing axle provide suspension. The side-valve cylinders each have a 5 inches (130 mm) stroke and 4 inches (100 mm) bore, fed by a single Zenith carburetor, with a Simms high tension magneto ignition. The engine drives through a pair of cone clutches giving forward and reverse gears with high and low ratios. A bevel gear drives the camshaft and connecting rods.

=== Leading dimensions ===
The following dimensions are given for the locomotive in its preserved state:

- Length: 10 feet 8 inches (3.25 m)
- Width: 4 feet (1.2 m)
- Height: 5 feet 9 inches (1.75 m)
- Driving wheel diameter: 1 foot 8 inches (0.51 m)
- Wheelbase: 2 feet 9 inches (0.84 m)
- Power output: 28 bhp @ 1,080 rpm
- Gear ratios: 1.8 to 1 and 3.6 to 1
- Final drive ratio: 4.43 to 1
- Nominal speed @ 800 rpm: 3 miles per hour (4.8 km/h) and 6 miles per hour (9.7 km/h)
- Weight in working order: 6.5 long tons (6.6 t)
