= Ursula Wood =

Ursula Wood may refer to:

- Ursula Vaughan Williams (1911–2007), English poet and author, previously Ursula Wood
- Ursula Wood (artist) (1868–1925), British artist and illustrator
