= Mynydd Esgairweddan =

Hill in Gwynedd, Wales

Coordinates: 52.6100°N 3.9531°W

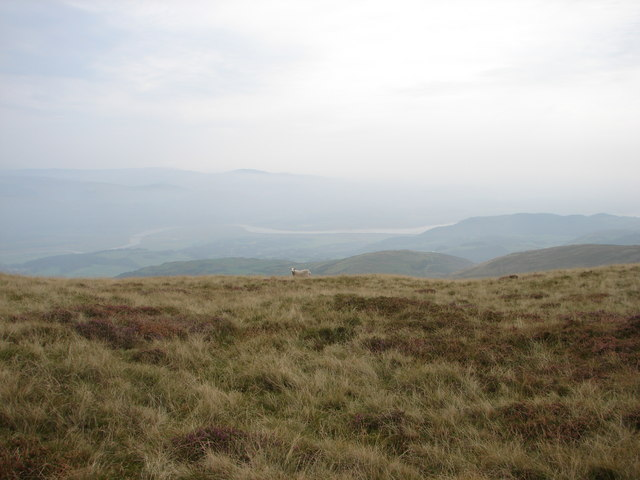
Mynydd Esgairweddan, heather & rough grassland on the open moor. Afon Dyfi meanders in the distance.

Mynydd Esgairweddan is a hill near Pennal in southern Gwynedd, Wales (grid reference SH6702). Nearby is the tiny settlement of Esgairweddan. It is very close to the site of the old Roman fort of Cefn Caer (Pennal). The area was described in the Topographical Dictionary of Wales by Samuel Lewis (published 1833) as;

"A tract of hilly and rocky ground but little adapted for purposes of agriculture. The soil is thin and poor, but, in some of the lower grounds, not altogether unproductive; the declivities of the hills afford only a scanty pasturage for sheep and young cattle: peat, which forms the principal fuel of the inhabitants, is found in various parts."

== History ==
The name Esgairweddan is most associated with the site of the ancestral demesne of the Price of Esgairweddan family, the senior branch of the Royal House of Gwynedd that survived the English conquest of Wales from 1282. Their ancestral home was known during the Middle Ages as Plas yn y Rofft. It was probably located at the place now named Cwrt (meaning Court) close to Esgairweddan. The line of Price of Esgairweddan became extinct with Robert Price, Esq. (died 1702), who left two daughters; Mary and Anne (Anne died in 1750). The estates, at the demise of the former, passed to the Edwardses of Talgarth and formed part of the Pennal Towers Estate. Frances Edwards (c. 1790–1828) married Captain Charles Thomas Thruston (d. 1858) of Hoxne, Suffolk. The last Thruston was killed in an uprising at Fort Luburan, Uganda in 1897 and since 1927 the land has been owned by a charitable trust.

Archaeological findings in the area date back to the Late Neolithic.
