= Red Lady of Paviland =

33,000-year-old human remains in Swansea, Wales

Coordinates: 51°33′0.31″N 4°15′18.67″W

Red "Lady" of Paviland
- "Dynes" Goch Pafiland (Welsh)
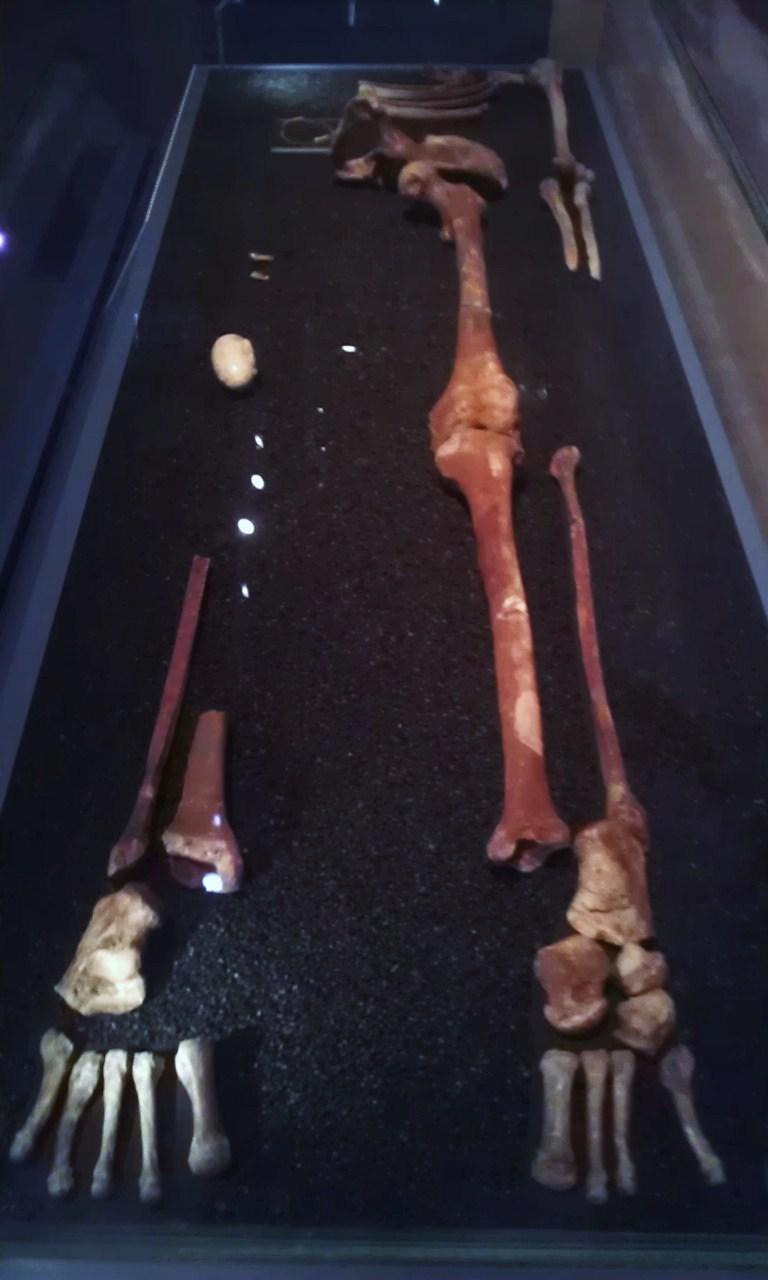
- Remains as seen from the feet
- Period/culture: late Aurignacian-early Gravettian, Upper Palaeolithic c. 34,000 years ago
- Discovered: 1823; Goat's Hole Cave, Gower Peninsula, Wales
- Discovered by: William Buckland

The Red "Lady" of Paviland (Welsh: "Dynes" Goch Pafiland) is an Upper Paleolithic partial male skeleton dyed in red ochre and buried in Wales approximately 34,000 years Before Present (approximately 32,000 BCE). The bones were discovered in 1823 by William Buckland in an archaeological dig at Goat's Hole Cave (Paviland cave) which is a limestone cave between Port Eynon and Rhossili on the Gower Peninsula, near Swansea in south Wales. Buckland believed the skeleton was a Roman-era female. Later, William Sollas examined Goat's Cave Paviland in 1912. There, Sollas found flint arrow heads and tools and correctly concluded that the skeleton was in fact a male hunter-gatherer or warrior during the last Ice Age.

Goat's Hole was occupied throughout prehistory. Artefacts are predominantly Aurignacian, but also include examples from the earlier Mousterian (Neanderthal), and Lincombian-Ranisian-Jerzmanowician and later Gravettian and Creswellian periods. The site is the oldest known ceremonial burial in Western Europe.

There have been calls to return the red skeleton of Paviland to Wales where it was discovered, and also specifically to Swansea.

== History ==
=== Discovery ===
In 1822, Daniel Davies and the Rev John Davies found animal bones, including the tusk of a mammoth. The Talbot family of Penrice Castle was informed and found "bones of elephants" on 27 December 1822. William Buckland, Professor of Geology at Oxford University arrived on 18 January 1823 and spent a week at the location site, Goat's Hole. Later that year, writing about his find in his book Reliquiae Diluvianae (Remains or relics of the Flood), Buckland stated:

I found the skeleton enveloped by a coating of a kind of ruddle [ ochre ] ... which stained the earth, and in some parts extended itself to the distance of about half an inch [12 mm] around the surface of the bones ... Close to that part of the thigh bone where the pocket is usually worn surrounded also by ruddle [were] about two handfuls of the Nerita littoralis [periwinkle shells]. At another part of the skeleton, viz in contact with the ribs [were] forty or fifty fragments of ivory rods [also] some small fragments of rings made of the same ivory and found with the rods ... Both rods and rings, as well as the Nerite shells, were stained superficially with red and lay in the same red substance that enveloped the bones

Buckland's treatise misjudged both its age and sex. He believed that human remains could not be older than the Biblical Great Flood, and thus wildly underestimated its true age, believing the remains to date to the Roman era. Buckland believed the skeleton was female largely because it was discovered with decorative items, including perforated seashell necklaces and jewellery thought to be of elephant ivory but now known to be carved from the tusk of a mammoth.

=== Later findings ===
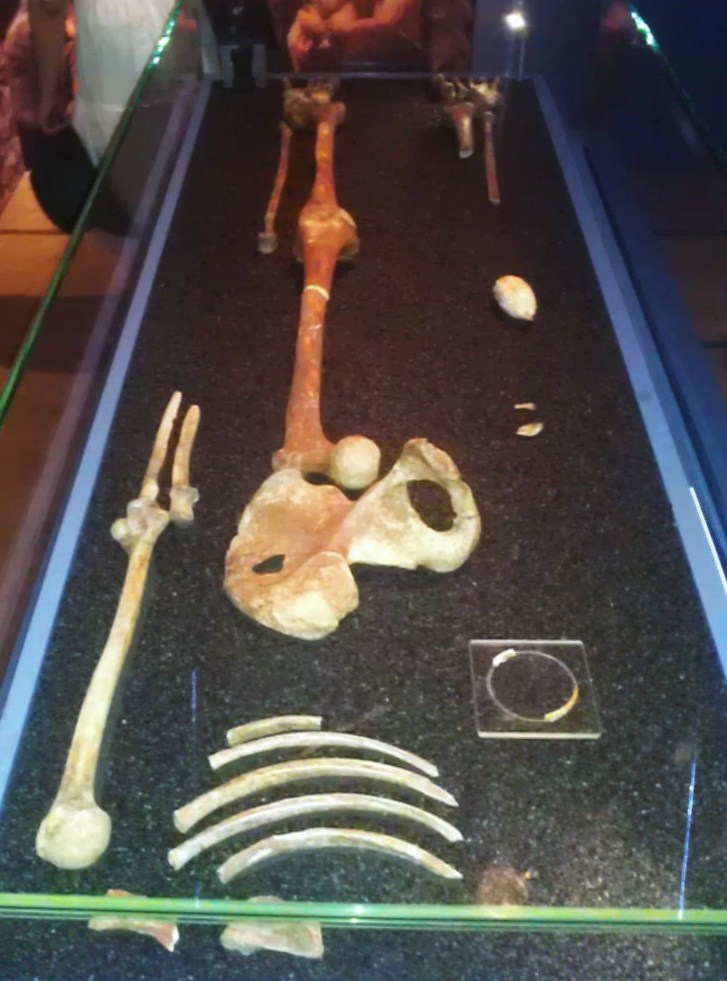
Remains as seen from the head

William Sollas made an expedition to Goat's Cave Paviland in 1912. There, Sollas found flint arrow heads and tools and correctly concluded that the skeleton was, in fact, a male hunter-gatherer or warrior during the last Ice Age. Over the last 100 years the date estimated by Sollas has been shifted from the Mesolithic period (4-10,000 BCE) to the Palaeolithic era (35,000/10,000 BCE) of the last Ice Age. However, before radiocarbon dating was invented in the 1950s, there was no existing scientific method for the determination of the age of any prehistoric remains.

In the 1960s, Kenneth Oakley published a radiocarbon determination of 18,460 ± 340 BP. Results published in 1989 and 1995 suggest that the individual from the cave lived about 26,000 years ago (26,350 ± 550 BP, OxA-1815), during the later periods of the Upper Paleolithic. A 2007 examination by Thomas Higham of Oxford University and Roger Jacobi of the British Museum suggested a dating of 29,000 years ago. A recalibration of the results in 2009 suggest an age of 33,000 years. A later 2010 study revised this to around 34,000 years ago.

Although now on the coast, at the time of the burial, the cave would have been located approximately 110 km (70 miles) inland, overlooking a plain. When the remains were dated to some 26,000 years ago, it was thought the "Red Lady" lived at a time when an ice sheet of the most recent glacial period in the British Isles, called the Devensian Glaciation, would have been advancing towards the site, and that consequently the weather would have been more like that of present-day Siberia, with maximum temperatures of perhaps 10°C in summer, −20° in winter, and a tundra vegetation. The new dating, however, indicates he lived during a warmer period.

Bone protein analysis indicates that he lived on a diet of between 15% and 20% fish, which, together with the distance from the sea, suggests that the people may have been semi-nomadic, or that the tribe transported the body from a coastal region for burial.

When the skeleton was discovered, Wales lacked a museum to house it, so it was moved to Oxford University, where Buckland was a professor. The bones are currently on display at the Oxford University Museum of Natural History. In December 2007, it was loaned for a year to the National Museum Cardiff. Subsequent excavations yielded more than 4,000 flints, teeth and bones, needles and bracelets, which are on exhibit at Swansea Museum and the National Museum in Cardiff.

Analysis of the evidence from the two excavations at Long Hole Cave on the Gower Peninsula, including sediment and pollen as well as the lithic evidence, has identified Long Hole as an Aurignacian site contemporary with and related to the site at Paviland, among the earliest evidence of modern humans in Britain.

== Proposed return to Wales ==
The Red "Lady" of Paviland was discovered in 1823 by William Buckland, a geology professor at Oxford University, and it was quickly transported to Oxford thereafter (some other artefacts were later repatriated). This prompted a two-century campaign for it to be repatriated.

In January 2023, the artefact was nicknamed the Welsh Elgin Marbles, after a group of ancient temple sculptures with calls for repatriation from the British Museum to Greece. The Red Lady is currently on display in the University of Oxford’s Museum of Natural History, and is described to be "well cared for". It has been stated by academics at Cardiff University, that if it were to return, it would enhance Wales's national collection and draw attention to its archaeology and caves.

University of Liverpool and Coimbra University in Portugal Prof George Nash says, "Some have attempted to portray the remains as some sort of ancient Welsh ancestor, which is palpable nonsense. Whoever he was, he was almost certainly of African or Arabian distinction, fleeing conflict or over-crowding in his more hospitable homeland. What's more, after the brief thaw of the Palaeolithic era, Wales was cut off again for several thousand years, so there's absolutely no chance of these remains having any genetic or cultural relationship to any modern Welsh person". However, he also acknowledged that the Red Lady "is a significant part of Welsh history", and stated that if the remains could be safely returned to Wales then that "would definitely be the right thing to do".

== See also ==
- Archaeology of Wales
- Barnfield Pit
- Bontnewydd Palaeolithic site
- Boxgrove Quarry
- Creswell Crags
- Gough's Cave
- Happisburgh
- Kents Cavern
- Pakefield
- Prehistoric Wales

=== General ===
- Genetic history of the British Isles
- Geology of the United Kingdom
- List of human evolution fossils
- List of prehistoric structures in Great Britain
- Prehistoric Britain
