= Hughes Memorial, Corris =

Obelisk memorial in Corris, Wales

Hughes Memorial
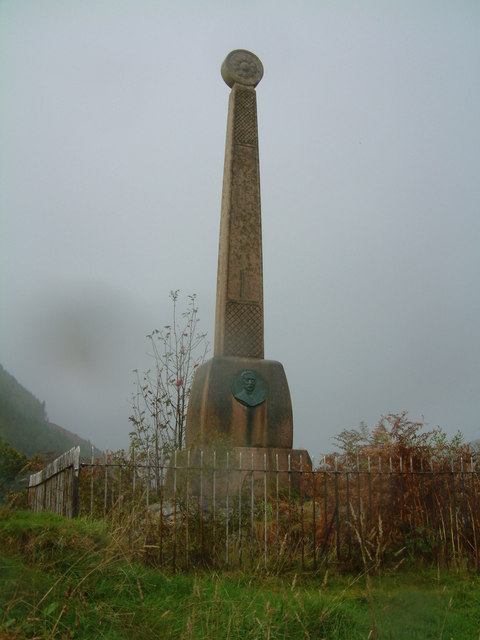
- The Hughes Memorial above Corris
- Interactive map of the Hughes Memorial area
- Etymology: Alfred W. Hughes

General information
- Type: War Memorial
- Location: Corris, Wales
- Coordinates: 52.6534°N 3.843°W
- Completed: 1905

Design and construction
- Architect: William Goscombe John

The Hughes Memorial in Corris is a memorial obelisk commemorating Alfred W. Hughes, who served as a surgeon in the Second Boer War. Hughes died of fever in South Africa in 1900. In 2013, Professor Chris Williams of Swansea University described it as one of the most important objects in Welsh history.

== Alfred W. Hughes ==
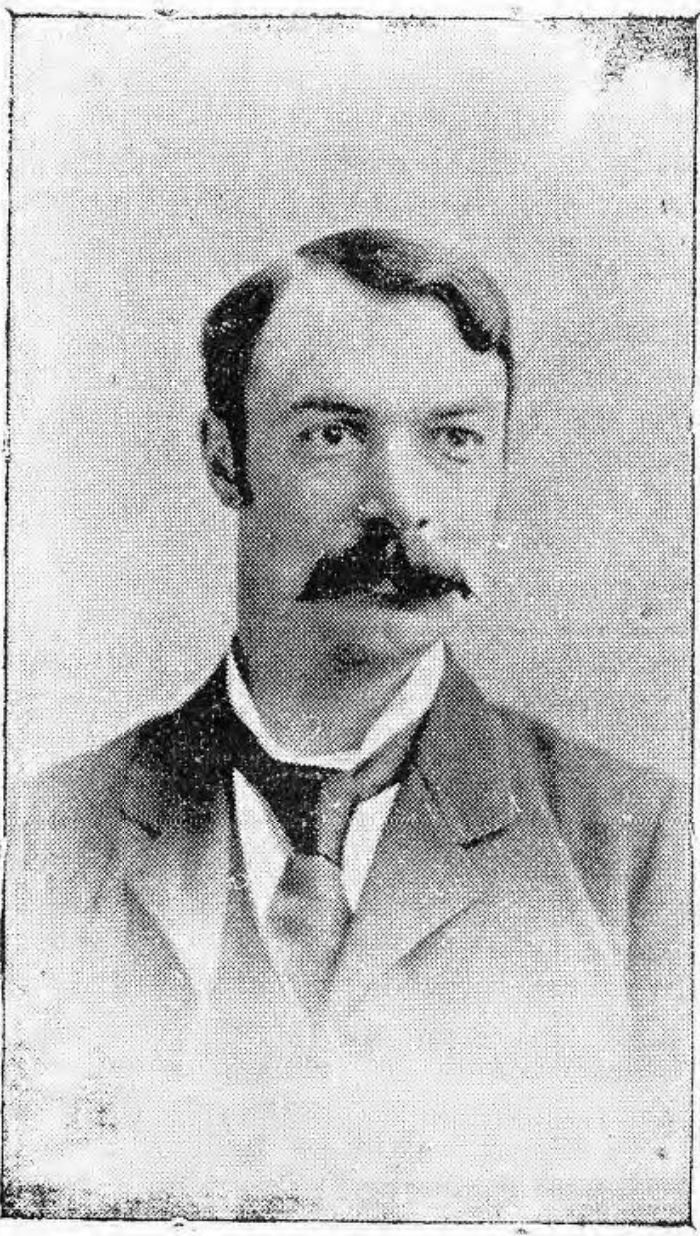
Professor Alfred W. Hughes in 1895

Alfred W. Hughes was born on 31 July 1861 at Fronwen, his family's house at Garneddwen, between Corris and Aberllefenni. His father, Robert (1813–1882), was the manager of the Aberllefenni Slate Quarry. He had three brothers, Llywelyn, Charles (b. 1859) and Arthur (1857–1918) who married author Molly Thomas in 1897.

Hughes trained as a draper in Dolgellau for a short time, then took a job as a clerk at Aberllefenni quarry. He then trained with a local doctor and in 1882 he went to the University of Edinburgh to study medicine. In 1889, he became a Fellow of the Royal College of Surgeons. In 1890, he was appointed Professor of the Edinburgh Medical College.

In 1893 he became the first Dean of the School of Medicine at Cardiff University, where he founded an anatomical museum. In 1897, he was appointed the Professor of Anatomy at King's College in London.

In 1897, Hughes left King's College. He joined the British Army and from 1899 he served in the Boer War. He founded and ran the Welsh Hospital in Springfontein. While on service he contracted typhoid and died on 3 November 1900.

== The memorial ==
The memorial was erected in 1905 and is a celtic cross carved from pink granite. It was designed by William Goscombe John. The Upper Corris Tramway curved round the memorial on the east and north sides.

The inscription on the monument reads:

In memory of

ALFRED W. HUGHES F.R.C.S.Professor of Anatomy, King's College, London who began his life's work among these hills and died of fever contracted in the South African war while superintending The Welsh Hospital which he originated and organized Born at Fronwen, Corris July 31st 1861 Died November 3rd 1900

erected by public subscription

On 9 December 1999, the monument was listed as a Grade II listed building by Cadw.
