= Llugwy Hall =

Grade II listed building in Gwynedd, Wales

Coordinates: 52.583°N 3.902°W

Llugwy is the name of an old property near Pennal, a village on the A493 road in southern Gwynedd, Wales, on the north bank of the Afon Dyfi/River Dovey, near Machynlleth. It lies in the former county of Merionethshire/Sir Feirionnydd, and is within the Snowdonia National Park.

The Anwyl Motto: Eryr eryrod Eryri Eagle of the Eagles of Snowdonia

Coat of arms of the descendants of Evan Anwyl (b.1718)

Llugwy was the home of the Anwyl family from 1682.

Maurice Anwyl (c.1645-c.1695), son of Evan (Ieuan) Anwyl of Brynkir, and the first of the family to live at Llugwy, is recorded by Thomas Nicholas in Annals and antiquities of the counties and county families of Wales (1872);

"The ancient family of Anwyl have resided at Llugwy from the time when Maurice Anwyl (circa 1695) m. Joan, the heiress of that place, but previously for many ages at Parc, in the parish of Llanfrothen, in the same county of Merionethshire. There Lewys Dwnn, Deputy Herald, found them, in the 16th Century, when pursuing his Heraldic Visitation of Wales; and there they had then been seated for several generations. Their lineage is from Owain Gwynedd, the illustrious Prince of North Wales (12th cent.), son of Prince Gruffudd ap Cynan, of the direct line (through the eldest son, Anarawd) of Rhodri Mawr, King, first of N. Wales, then of all Wales (9th cent.)."

(See main article on the Llugwy branch of the Anwyl family.)

On the opposite bank of the Dyfi from Llugwy lay Cei Ward, one of a number of riverside quays in the hamlet of Morben.

Some 5 boxes of family archives (dated 1633 - 1943) exist in the Meirionnydd Archives, and these include wills, marriage settlements, correspondence, and estate papers (1809-1949), which includes accounts and some deeds.

A document of 1792 records "Evan Anwyl of Llugwy in the parish of Pennal in the county of Merioneth, gent".

Letters dated c.1800 were sent by Margaret Anwyl, Aberystwyth to her mother Mrs Anwyl of Llugwy.

A Sacrament Certificate of 1821 records that "Jonathan Anwyl of Llugwy, pa.[rish] Pennal, had received the Sacrament of the Lords Supper at Pennal Parish Church"

The 1861 Census records Llugwy as the home of Robert Anwyl, aged 73, a "Landed proprietor", and his sister Elizabeth Anwyl, aged 68. The names of 4 servants are also listed. Further members of the Anwyl family are recorded as living at the nearby property of Llwynon.

The 1901 Census makes reference to "Llugwy", "Llugwy Lodge", "Llugwy Lodge Cottage" and "Llugwy Stable". Members of the Anwyl family are again recorded as living at Llwynon.

Some Roman vases have been found near Llugwy, and on the other bank of the river are the remains of a Roman fortlet called Cefn Caer, at Erglodd farm, between Taliesin and Talybont. It is thought that the fort guarded a ford or ferry crossing of the river Dyfi on the Sarn Helen Roman road.

Today the property, a Grade II listed building, is a private house. At some time after 1948 it was apparently used for institutional care. It seems to have opened as a hotel, known as the Llugwy Hall Country House Hotel, in 1980, being advertised from early 1981. Later, it was a hotel and (later) Management Training Centre, known as Llugwy Hall Country House and owned by Llugwy Hall Ltd. However, it closed in the 1990s.
