= Garnedd-Wen Formation =

Geological formation in Wales

- Stratigraphic range: Hirnantian
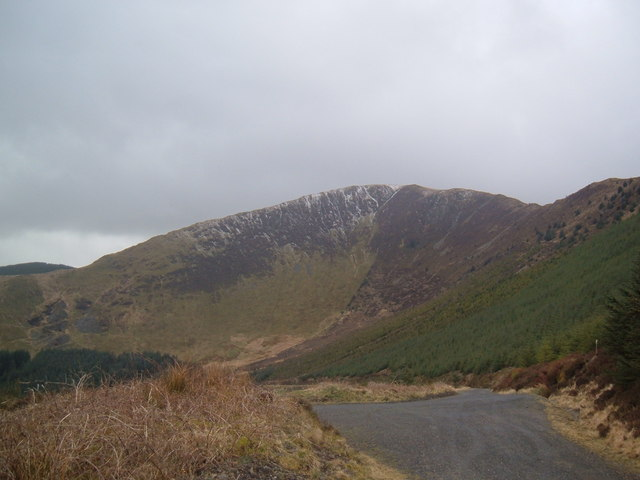
- The upper slopes of Tarren y Gesail are primarily in the Garnedd-Wen Formation
- Type: Formation
- Unit of: Abercorris Group
- Overlies: Narrow Vein Mudstone Formation
- Thickness: 1,000 metres (3,300 ft) to 3,000 metres (9,800 ft)

Lithology
- Primary: Mudstone
- Other: Sandstone

Location
- Coordinates: 52°38′07″N 3°54′26″W
- Region: Mid Wales
- Country: Wales
- Extent: Tywyn to Dinas Mawddwy

Type section
- Named for: Garneddwen

The Garnedd-Wen Formation (also known as the Garnedd-Wen Beds) is an Ordovician lithostratigraphic formation (a sequence of rock strata) in Mid Wales. The rock of the formation is a mixture of mudstones, siltstones, fine- to coarse-grained sandstones, greywackes and conglomerates. The formation extends from Dinas Mawddwy in the north-east to Tywyn in the south-west.

== Geography ==
The Garnedd-Wen Formation is the upper strata of rock across a wide part of western Mid Wales. In particular, it forms the upper rock beds of the Tarren Hills on the south side of the Bala Fault, west of Talyllyn Lake.
