= Garneddwen =

Coordinates: 52.662°N 3.829°W

- Garneddwen

- Location within Gwynedd
- OS grid reference: SH763088
- Community: Corris
- Principal area: Gwynedd
- Country: Wales
- Sovereign state: United Kingdom
- Post town: MACHYNLLETH
- Postcode district: SY20
- Dialling code: 01654
- Police: North Wales
- Fire: North Wales
- Ambulance: Welsh
- UK Parliament: Dwyfor Meirionnydd
- Senedd Cymru – Welsh Parliament: Dwyfor Meirionnydd

Garneddwen (also known as Garnedd-Wen; English: white cairn) is a hamlet in the south of the county of Gwynedd, Wales. It lies in the historic county of Merionethshire/Sir Feirionnydd, in the valley of the Afon Dulas.

It consists primarily of a single row of terraced houses, built for the workers at Aberllefenni Slate Quarry. The hamlet was named after a large cairn ("carnedd" in Welsh) that was to be found in a field below the farm of the same name up to Victorian times.

== History ==
Sarn Helen, a Roman road which connected the north and south parts of Roman Wales, probably ran through the hamlet.

Nearby is Fronwen, built as a family home by the quarry manager Robert Hughes (1813–1882) and his wife Jane née Deakin (1822–1906). They had four sons who were born in this house :

- Llewelyn Robert (born 1856)
- Arthur Edward (1857–1918), who married future author Molly Thomas in 1897
- Charles Ernest (born 1859)
- Alfred William (1861–1900) Professor of Anatomy and Dean of the Faculty of King's College London, whose monument stands on the outskirts of Corris

=== Railway Station ===
Garneddwen railway station was a station on the former Corris Railway, a narrow gauge railway which ran from Aberllefenni to Machynlleth. The station was open from 25 August 1887, until the end of passenger services, in December 1930. The Corris Railway closed completely on 20 August 1948, and the track was lifted between Aberllefenni and Corris (through Garneddwen, which lies in the middle) in November 1948. The former railway's trackbed at Garneddwen is now an access road for the hamlet.

Preceding station	Disused railways	Following station
Corris	Corris Railway	Aberllefenni

== Geology ==
The hamlet gives its name to the Garnedd-Wen Formation, a thick rock stratum that runs from Tywyn to Dinas Mawddwy and was first identified close by the settlement.
