= Derwenlas =

Coordinates: 52.57517°N 3.88493°W

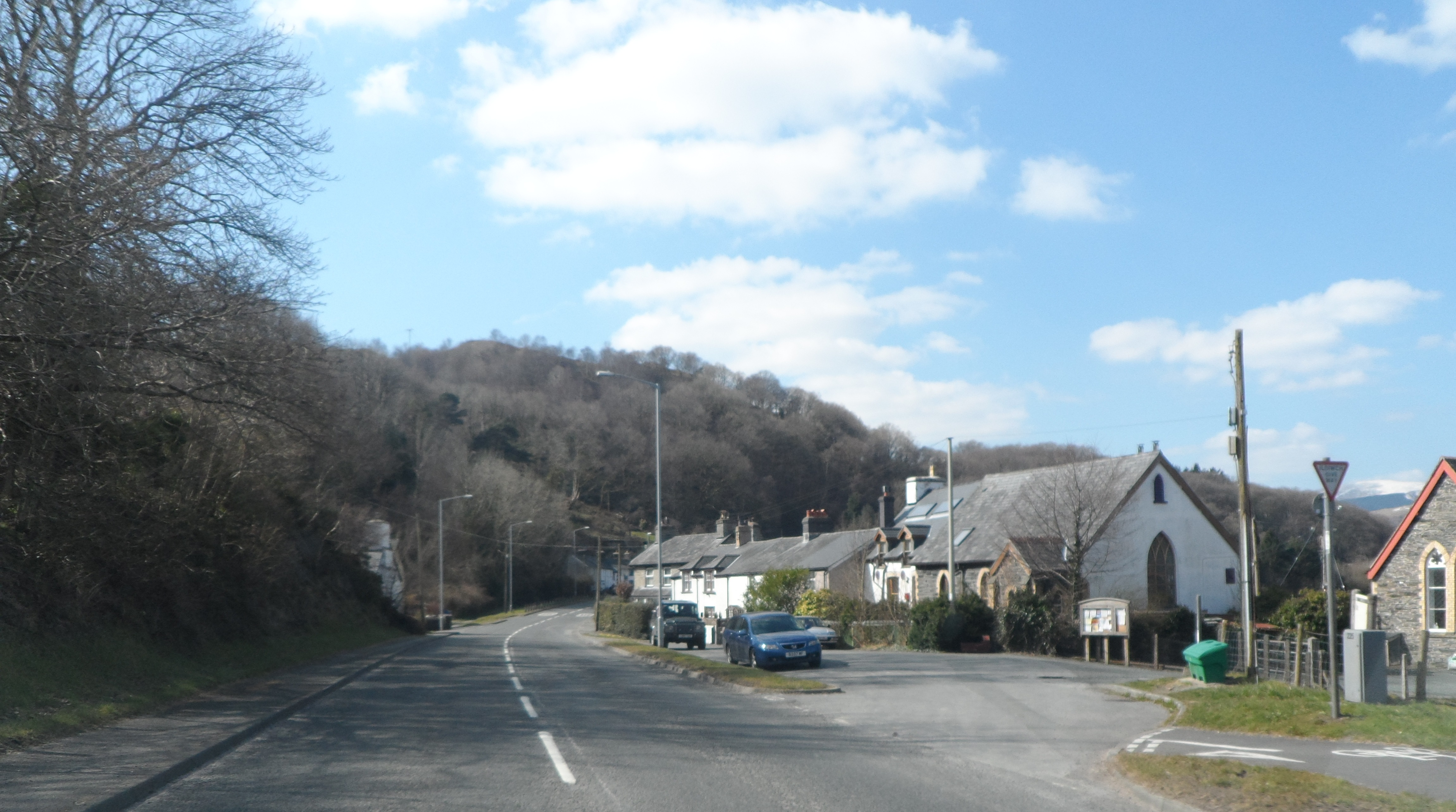

- Location within Powys
- OS grid reference: SN723991
- Principal area: Powys
- Preserved county: Powys
- Country: Wales
- Sovereign state: United Kingdom
- Post town: MACHYNLLETH
- Postcode district: SY20
- Police: Dyfed-Powys
- Fire: Mid and West Wales
- Ambulance: Welsh
- UK Parliament: Montgomeryshire and Glyndŵr
- Senedd Cymru – Welsh Parliament: Montgomeryshire

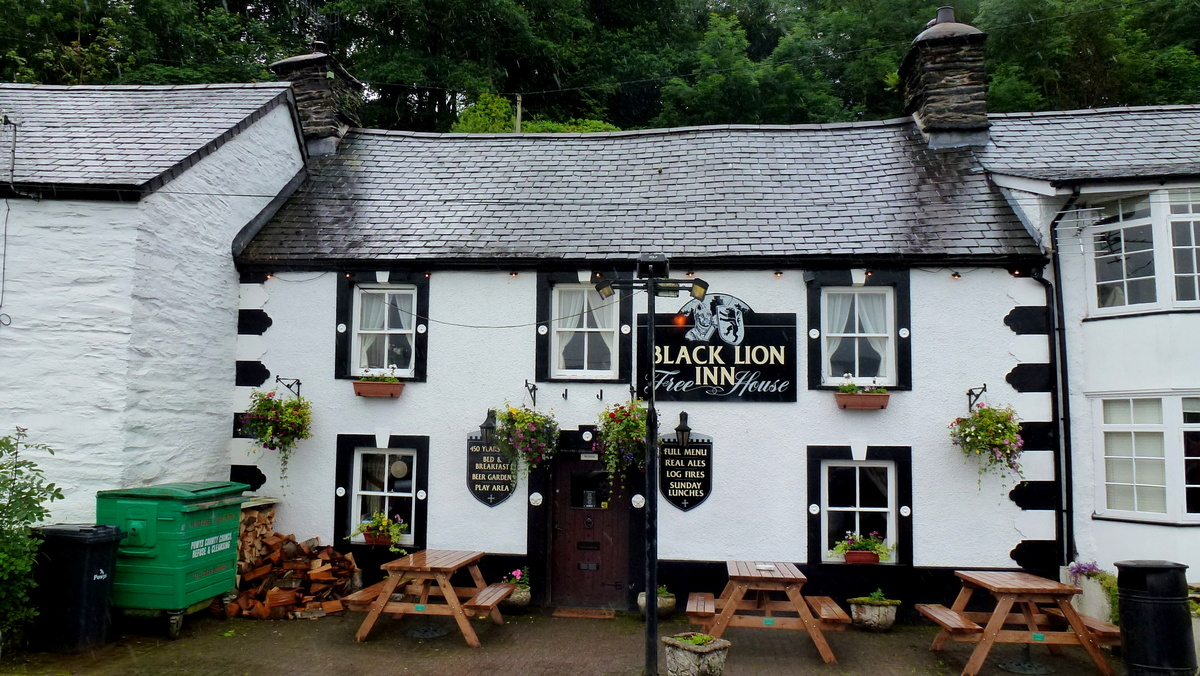
The Black Lion Inn

Derwenlas is a hamlet in northern Powys, Wales. It is part of the community of Cadfarch.

Part of the historic county of Montgomeryshire (Welsh: Sir Drefaldwyn) from 1536 to 1974, it lies on the River Dyfi and was once a port serving the market town of Machynlleth. Derwenlas lies on the A487 trunk road from Machynlleth to Aberystwyth.

== History ==
Between 1797 and 1812 a road was built from Machynlleth to Garreg near Glandyfi, passing through Derwenlas. This new route enabled Derwenlas to develop as a port as it was the highest point on the Dyfi that was navigable by coastal ships - boats of up to 70 tons could reach there at high tide. A wide variety of goods were shipped into and out of the port. Incoming goods included gunpowder to be stored in Morben Quarry, lime and coal for the limekilns at Pentre Cilyn, rye, wheat and hides. Outgoing goods included slate and lead from local mines, timber, bark and corn.

From 1830, traffic at the port increased substantially. With ever increasing demand for water transport, shipbuilding began at Derwenlas, with three separate builders established by the quays.

In 1859, the narrow-gauge Corris, Machynlleth & River Dovey Tramroad was opened to bring slate from the quarries around Corris and Aberllefenni to the riverside quays at Derwenlas and Morben. The principal quays at Derwenlas were Cei Ellis and Cei Tafarn Isa, where the slate was loaded onto coastal ships and taken to Aberdyfi where it was reloaded into larger vessels for distribution around Great Britain and Ireland.

In 1863, the Aberystwith and Welsh Coast Railway extended the standard-gauge rails west of Machynlleth and, on reaching Derwenlas, built the new line across the bend of the river by filling in the channel and creating a new course for the Dyfi, in the process cutting off Derwenlas' quays from the river channel and killing off the port.

The tramroad continued to Cei Ward at Morben where further quays gave access to the river. The last of these was abandoned in 1869 when Braich Goch quarry moved to its newly built wharf at Machynlleth station. The tramroad between Machynlleth Town station and Cei Ward was then abandoned and the track was lifted.
