= Cwm Ebol quarry =

Former slate quarry near Pennal, in Merionethshire, Wales

Cwm Ebol
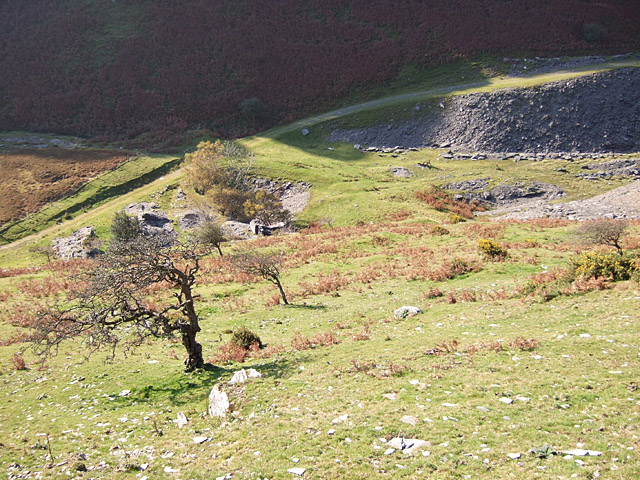
- The remains of Cwm Ebol quarry in 2007

- Location in Gwynedd

Location
- Location: near Pennal, Merioneth (now Gwynedd), Wales; 52.596771°N 3.938203°W SH 689 017

Production
- Products: Slate
- Type: Quarry

History
- Opened: c.1860
- Closed: 1906

The Cwm Ebol quarry (also known as Cwmebol quarry) was a slate quarry about 1 mile (1.6 km) north west of the village of Pennal in Mid Wales. It operated from about 1860 to about 1906. It was the last Welsh slate quarry connected only to a trans-shipment point instead of directly to a railway.

== History ==
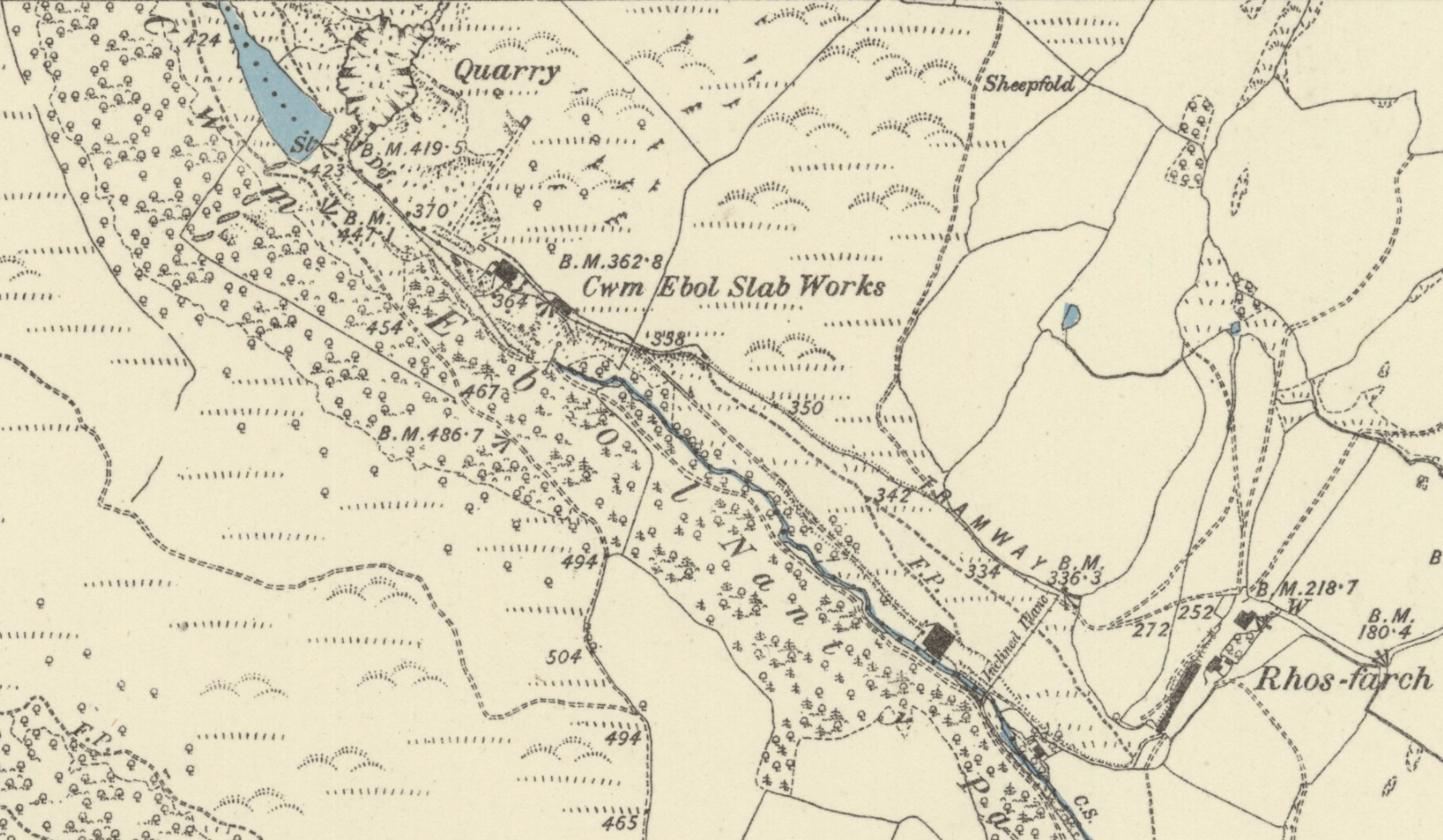
Extract from the 1887 Ordnance Survey map, showing Cwm Ebol quarry

=== Cwmebol Slab and Slate ===
Cwm Ebol quarry started working on a small scale around 1860, worked by the Cwmebol Slab and Slate Co. Ltd. An open pit was dug into the slate vein, and initially slabs were worked in the mill next to the pit. The mill was powered by a waterwheel. In 1870 there were calls for a railway station to be built at Pennal, partly in anticipation of the output of Cwm Ebol.

In early 1874, the company failed and the quarry was put up for sale. There was a fatal accident at the quarry on 30 April 1874, when quarryman Jacob Davies was crushed by a falling rock while working to clear an earlier fall.

=== New Cwmebol Slate and Slab ===
In 1875 the quarry was taken over by the New Cwmebol Slate and Slab Co. Ltd. The company built a new, lower mill which was completed in 1876, and they were exploring a second vein which they hoped could be worked to produce roofing slates. The company chairman was F. Thompson, and the quarry manager was R. G. Elwes.

=== John Jenkins ===
By 1883, the quarry had been purchased by John Jenkins of Aberystwyth. He remained the owner for the rest of the quarry's history. Jenkins had previously owned Gartheiniog quarry near Aberangell. In 1885, the quarry produced just 257 tons of finished product.

There was another fatal accident on 26 June 1894. Hugh Owen was repairing a drive pelt in the mill, when he got pulled into the machinery and was crushed. He died on 1 July of head injuries.

==== Decline and closure ====
The quarry, never a great success, struggled in the late 1890s. In 1898 only twelve workers were employed there. In 1900, 19-year-old Llewelyn Jones lost an arm during blasting operations. A fuse had failed to go off, and Jones had been inspecting it when the charge ignited. Evan Jones, the quarry manager was subsequently fined £2 10s (equivalent to £204 in 2018) for not properly enforcing the blasting rules. In July 1903, Jenkins was charged with not paying the rates due on the quarry and ordered to pay the £14 due for 1902 and 1903. The quarry was down to just eight workers in 1903. The quarry closed in 1906 and in 1907, the company was advertising the quarry machinery for sale.

== Transport ==
During the 1860s, slate from Cwm Ebol was carted to a wharf at Llyn y Bwtri, on the north bank of the Afon Dyfi, to the south of Pennal. In 1865, the company built a long tramway to connect the quarry with the wharf.

The tramway was originally built to 3 ft (914 mm) gauge, both internally within the quarry complex, and for the longer line which was nearly 2 miles (3.2 km) long. It was later converted to 2 ft (610 mm) gauge. It originally crossed the Machynlleth to Aberdyfi road at Pennal to reach the river wharf. By 1887, the tramway terminated at the road with slate being loaded onto the Cambrian Railways at Machynlleth. It was the last Welsh slate quarry connected only to a trans-shipment point instead of directly to a railway or to a sea port.

The lower trackbed of the tramway was re-used between 1918 and 1920 for another 2 ft (610 mm) gauge tramway that served timber felling operations at Cwm Dwr, 2 miles (3.2 km) north of Pennal.

== Quarry reservoir ==
A large reservoir was built above the quarry, damning the Nant Cwm Ebol. The reservoir provided water to power the mill machinery in the quarry, initially by waterwheel and later using a Pelton wheel. The reservoir was maintained after the quarry closed.

In 2012, after prolonged heavy rains across Mid Wales, the dam wall was breached. 600 residents of Pennal and surrounding houses were evacuated, and a controlled release of water took place to reduce the level in the reservoir. A permanent channel was cut into the dam to prevent a recurrence of the problem.
