= Long Hole Cave =

Cave and archaeological site in the United Kingdom

- location in Wales Long Hole Cave (the United Kingdom)
- 51°32′34″N 4°14′5.6″W
- Type: limestone cave
- Location: between Paviland and Port Eynon
- Region: Wales

Site notes
- Excavation dates: 1861, 1969
- Archaeologists: E. R. Wood, J. B. Campbell

Long Hole, also spelled Longhole, is a limestone cave on the south coast of the Gower Peninsula between Paviland and Port Eynon. It is relatively small, measuring about 15 m (49 ft) deep after several excavations. It was first excavated in 1861 by Colonel E. R. Wood. Wood found evidence of a lithic assemblage and faunal remains. The faunal remains included cave hyena, reindeer, Woolly rhinoceros, mammoth, straight-tusked elephant and wild horse.

A second excavation was conducted in 1969 by J. B. Campbell. Analysis of the evidence from the two excavations, including sediment and pollen as well as the lithic evidence, has identified Long Hole as an Aurignacian site contemporary with and related to the site at Paviland, evidence of the first modern humans in Britain.
