= Mary Hughes (British author) =

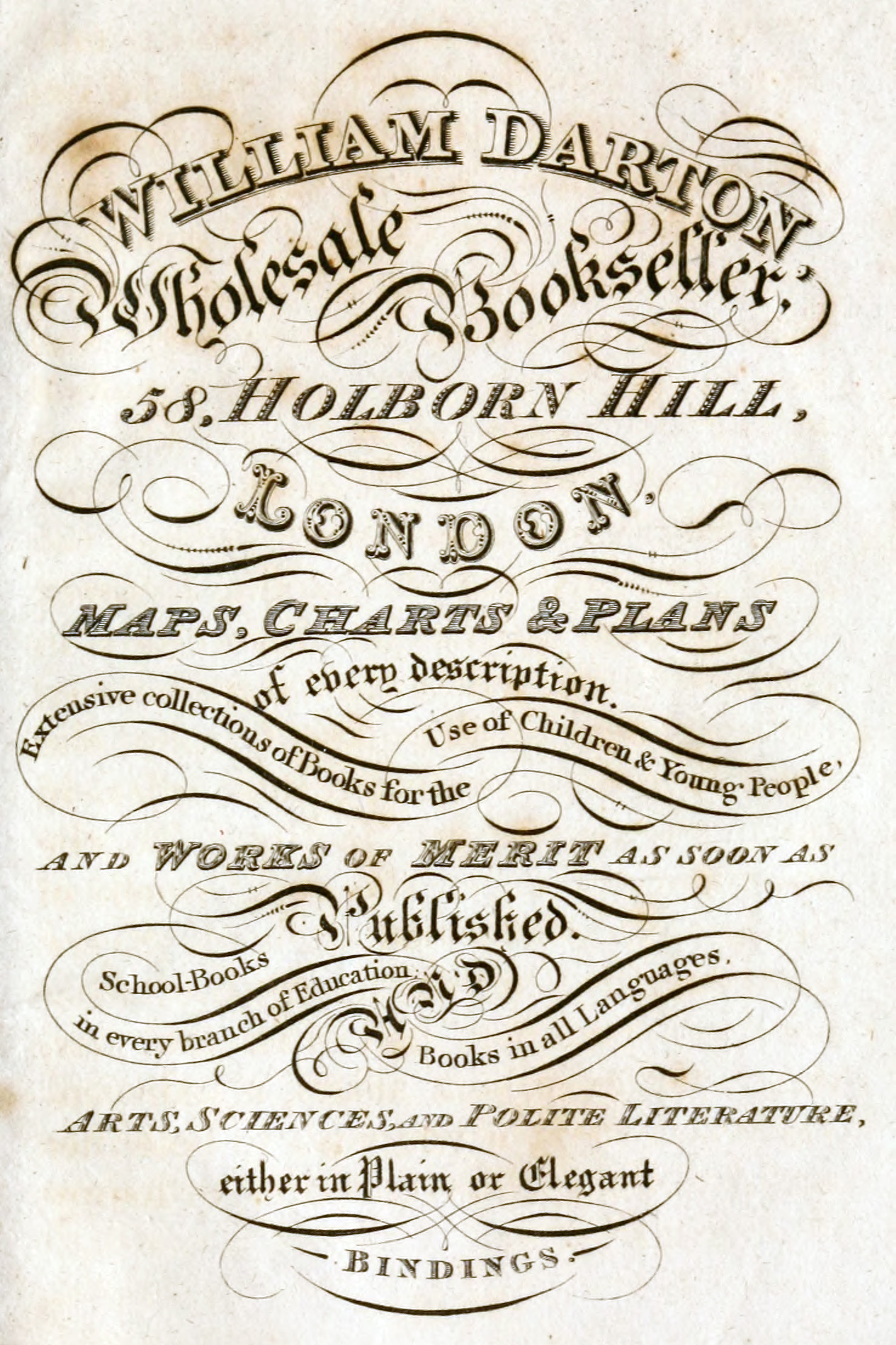
One of William Darton's advertisements, an early publisher of Hughes. From A Mother's Care Rewarded

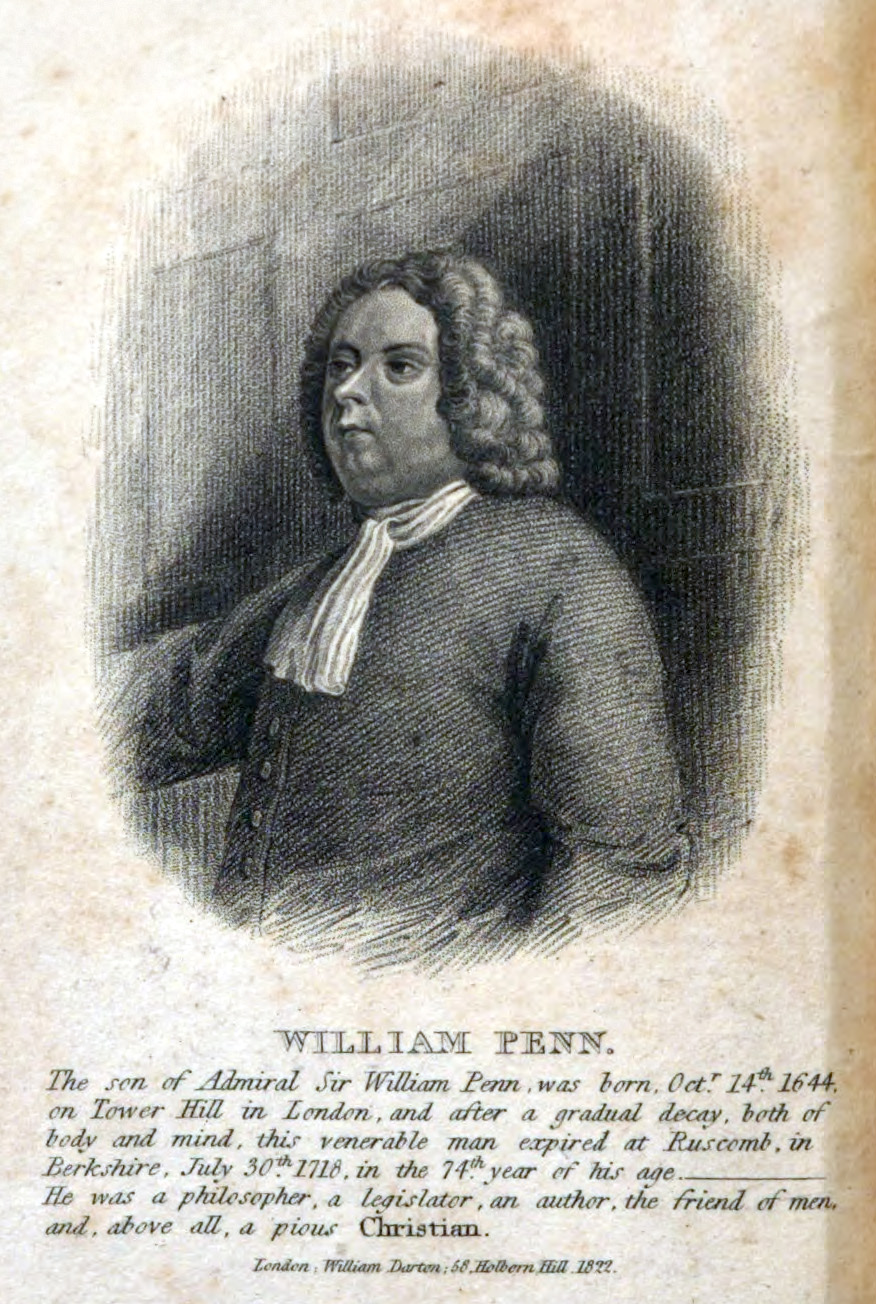
Life of William Penn's book art

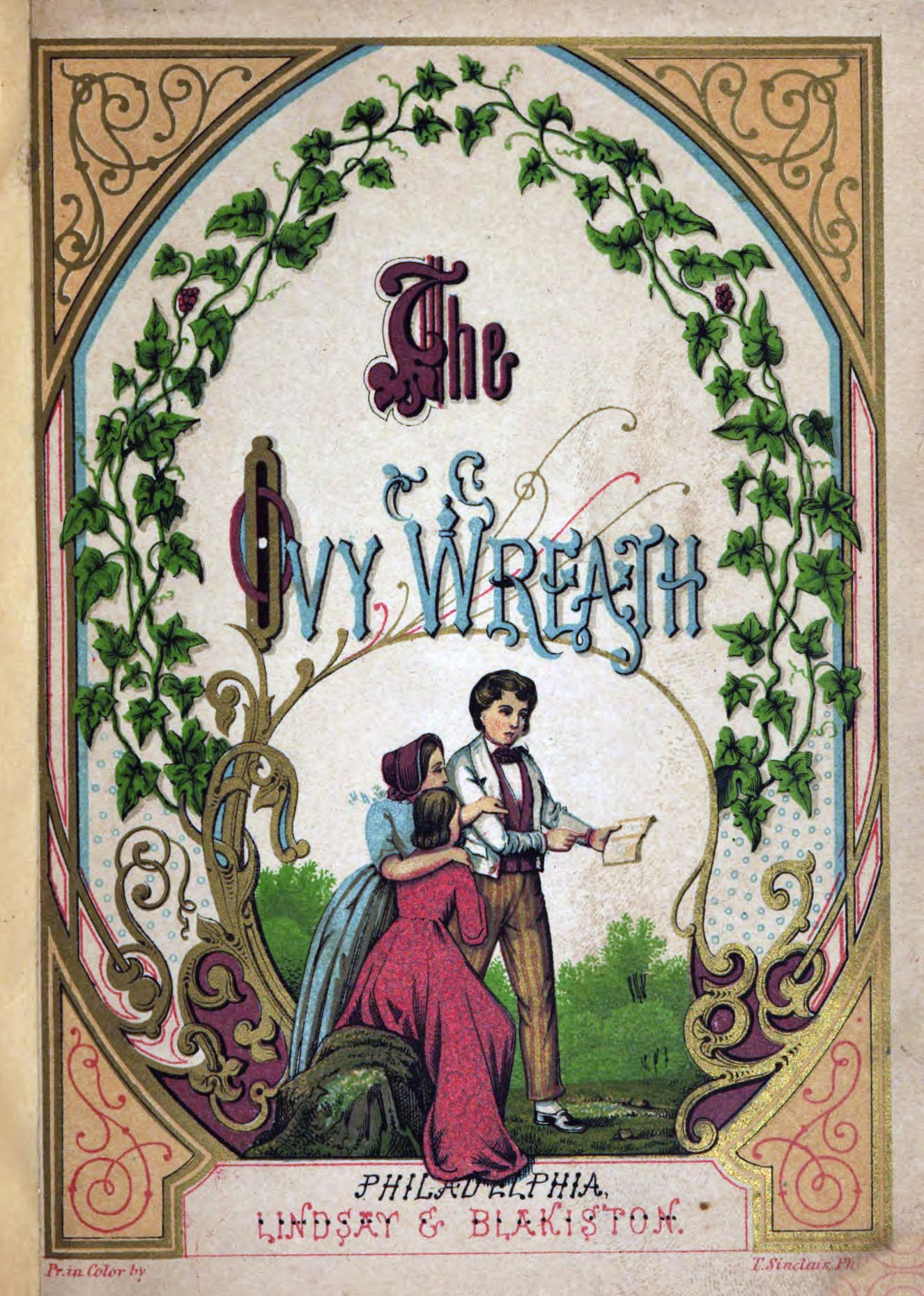
Book art for one of Hughes' more popular novels, The Ivy Wreath

Mary Hughes (sometimes spelled Hughs), née Mary Robson, was a British children's and Christian literature author.

== Biography ==
She was born in Newcastle, England, and began writing children's books in 1811. Her first works, including Aunt Mary's Tales for the Entertainment and Improvement of Little Girls: Addressed to her Nieces, written in 1811, followed by Aunt Mary's Tales for the Entertainment and Improvement of Little Boys: Addressed to her Nephews in 1813, and The Ornaments Discovered in 1815, were all popular novels in England, so much so that they were also published abroad in the United States unbeknownst to Hughes. She also wrote several pamphlets for the Christian Tract Society, becoming a member for life in 1813.

She married Thomas Hughes, from Dundee, Scotland, in 1817, and the year after, emigrated to Philadelphia. When Mary Hughes arrived, she found that "the popularity of her books preceded her" and "commenced a school for young ladies" with the help of philanthropist John Vaughan Esq.

On the subject of the nameless school, Sarah Josepha Buell Hale, author of Woman's Record, states, "... it is believed few undertakings ever rose more rapidly in popularity, as many of the mothers of the present generation, in the most distinguished families in the city, can testify."

Hughes was also a frequent contributor to the publisher Lindsay and Blakiston. In The Mother's Birthday, a Lindsay and Blakiston publisher advertisement writes, "Mrs. Hughs is well-known as one of our most popular contributors..." and "We are glad to see a lady of Mrs. Hughs' abilities so usefully employed."

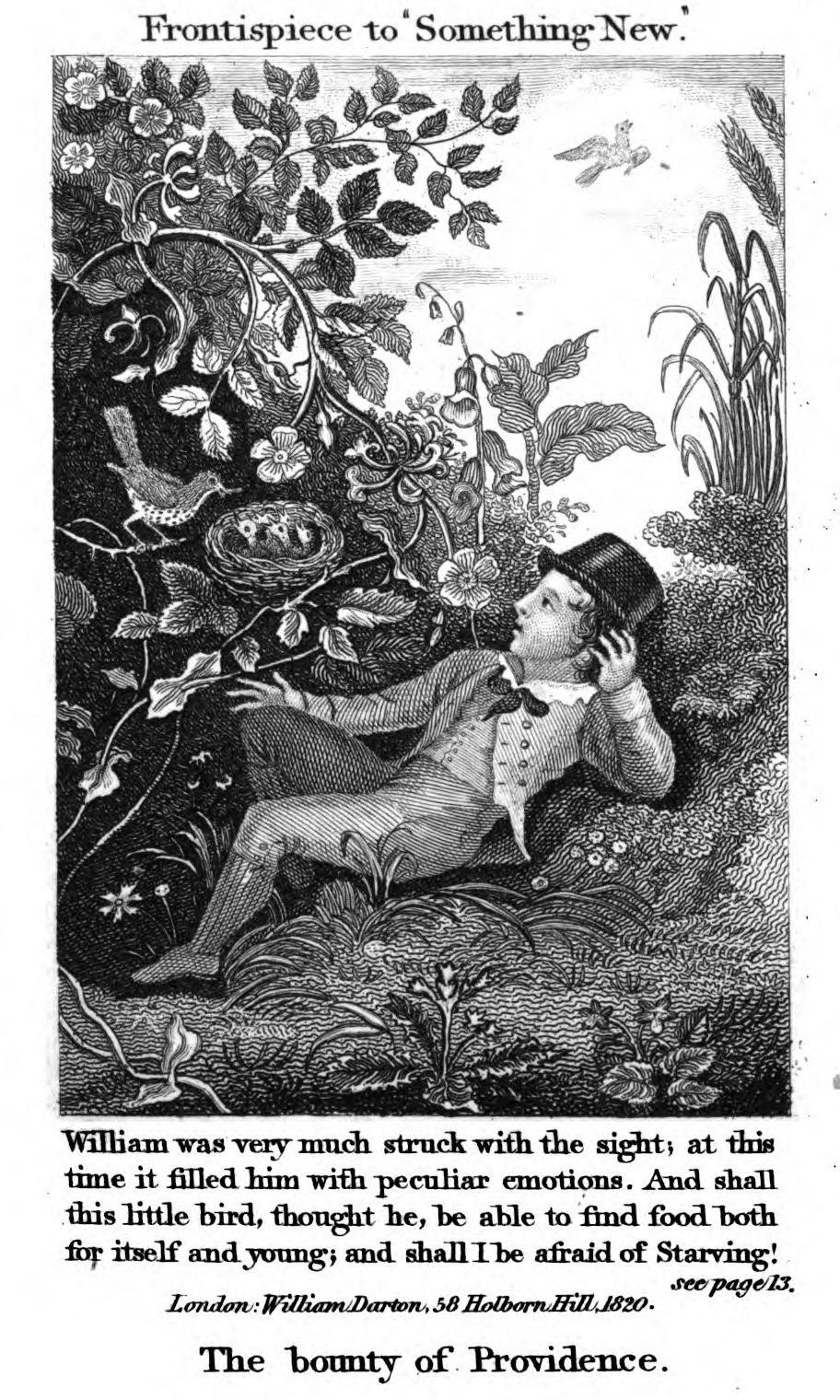
An illustration from Something New From Aunt Mary

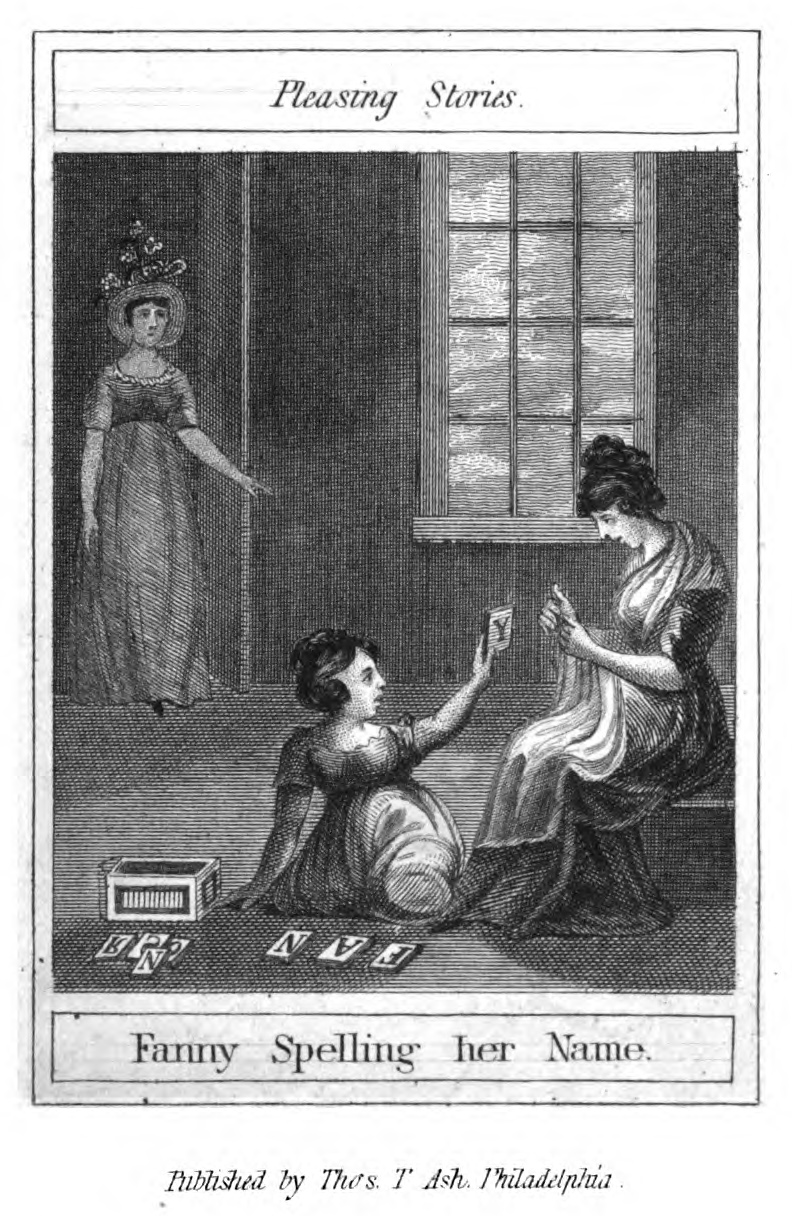
Book art from Pleasing and Instructive Stories

After 21 years of running the school, in 1839, Mary Hughes and her husband Thomas retired to a farm in Doylestown, Bucks County, Pennsylvania.

== List of attributed works ==
Year	Title	Notes	Ref.
1811	Aunt Mary's Tales for the Entertainment and Improvement of Little Girls: Addressed to her Nieces	Links to 2nd edition, 1819	
1813	Aunt Mary's Tales for the Entertainment and Improvement of Little Boys: Addressed to her Nephews	Links to 2nd American edition, 1827	
1815	The Ornaments Discovered	Links to 2nd edition, 1821	
1818	The Metamorphoses	Believed to be 1st edition	
1818	The Alchemist		
1819	The Orphan Girl	Believed to be 1st edition	
1820	A Natural History of Quadrupeds in Simple Verse: Designed for Children	Believed to be 1st edition	
1820	The Twin Brothers	Boase cites 1839, yet this edition is earlier	
1820	Something New From Aunt Mary		
1820	Village Dialogues	Printed in vol. 1 of Tracts Designed to Inculcate Moral Conduct on Christian Principles, published by the Christian Tract Society. Boase cites 1839 as well	
1820	The Sick Man's Friend	Printed in vol. 3 of Tracts Designed to Inculcate Moral Conduct on Christian Principles, published by the Christian Tract Society.	
1820	An Affectionate Address to the Poor	Printed in vol. 3 of Tracts Designed to Inculcate Moral Conduct on Christian Principles, published by the Christian Tract Society.	
1821	The Rebellious Schoolgirl		
1822	The Life of William Penn		
1824	A Mother's Care Rewarded: in the Correction of Those Defects Most General in Young People, During Their Education	Hathitrust.org cites Hughes as the author, though the book makes no reference to her	
1829	Emma Mortimer		
1830	Pleasing and Instructive Stories	Links to an undated edition	
1835	The Two Schools		
1836	Sickroom Dialogues, 4th Edition		
1846	Julia Ormond		
1849	The Ivy Wreath	Believed to be published in 1849 by Lindsay and Blakiston; original publication date unknown	
1849	The Proud Girl Humbled; or, The Two School-mates	Published by Lindsay and Blakiston in 1849; original publication date unknown	
1849	Holidays in the Country, or, Vanity Disappointed	Published by Lindsay and Blakiston in 1849; original publication date unknown	
1849	Lissie Linden and Her Mockingbird	Published by Lindsay and Blakiston in 1849; original publication date unknown	
1849	Generosity, or, the Story of Sybella and Florence	Believed to be published in 1849 by Lindsay and Blakiston; original publication date unknown	
1849	The Mother's Birthday, or, the Broken Vase	Published by Lindsay and Blakiston in 1849; original publication date unknown	
1849	The Gipsy Fortune-Teller, or, the Troubadour	Published by Lindsay and Blakiston in 1849; original publication date unknown	
1849	Frank Worthy, or, the Orphan and His Benefactor	Published by Lindsay and Blakiston in 1849; original publication date unknown	
1849	May Morning, or, a Visit to the Country	Published by Lindsay and Blakiston in 1849; original publication date unknown	
1850	The Young Artist, or, Self-Conquest	Published by Lindsay and Blakiston in 1850; original publication date unknown	
1850	The Young Sailor, or, Perseverance Rewarded	Published by Lindsay and Blakiston in 1850; original publication date unknown	
?	Buds and Blossoms	Unknown publication date	
