= Ursula Wood (artist) =

English painter (1868-1956)

- Born: 1868
- Died: 1956 (aged 87–88)
- Education: St John's Wood Art School, Royal Academy schools
- Known for: Painting

Ursula Wood (1868-1956), was a British artist and illustrator who had a long and distinguished career and is now best known for her depictions of the work of the Women's Land Army during World War One.

== Biography ==
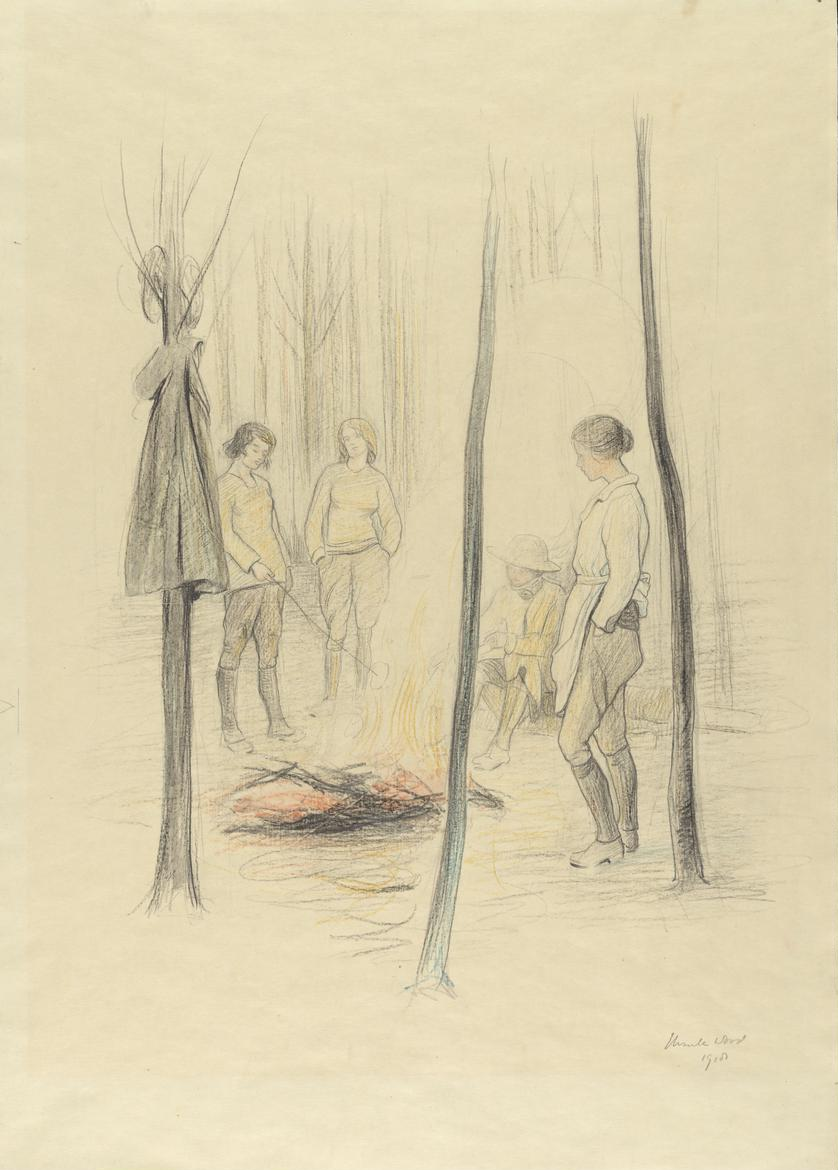
Girls of the Women's Forestry Corp, The Timber Camp, Hatfield, December 1918 (IWM:ART 2301)

The daughter of a barrister, Wood grew up in North London with two older sisters and a twin sister. Her sister Catherine became a painter, exhibited regularly at the Royal Academy between 1884 and 1922, and married fellow painter Richard Henry Wright. Ursula and her twin sister, Mary, were lifelong friends of the educator and writer Mary Vivian Hughes. Hughes' memoir A London Girl of the 1880s includes brief sketches of Ursula Wood as a teenager, and Wood illustrated Hughes' first book, The King of Kings (1903).

Wood trained at the St John's Wood Art School and at the Royal Academy schools where, in 1889, she won the Turner Gold medal and a £50 scholarship for one of her landscape paintings. Wood exhibited with the Society of Lady Artists in 1895 and received a favourable mention in The Times. As well as working in oils and with woodcuts, Wood also illustrated books, including at least one by E. Boyd Bayley, produced lithographs and decorated furniture. She engraved a series of views of Venice. She established a successful commercial studio in London with a Miss E Stewart Wood as a partner.

At the start of the First World War, Wood closed down her business and volunteered to join the Women's Forestry Corps, one of the three divisions of the Women's Land Army. While working at a forestry camp in Wendover, Wood continued to paint and in January 1919 she contacted the Women's Work Committee of the Imperial War Museum. The Women's Work Committee had begun to collect artworks showing women's contribution to the war effort and so Wood offered them some of her sketches from Wendover. After much haggling over fees the Committee paid Wood 15 guineas for five sketches.

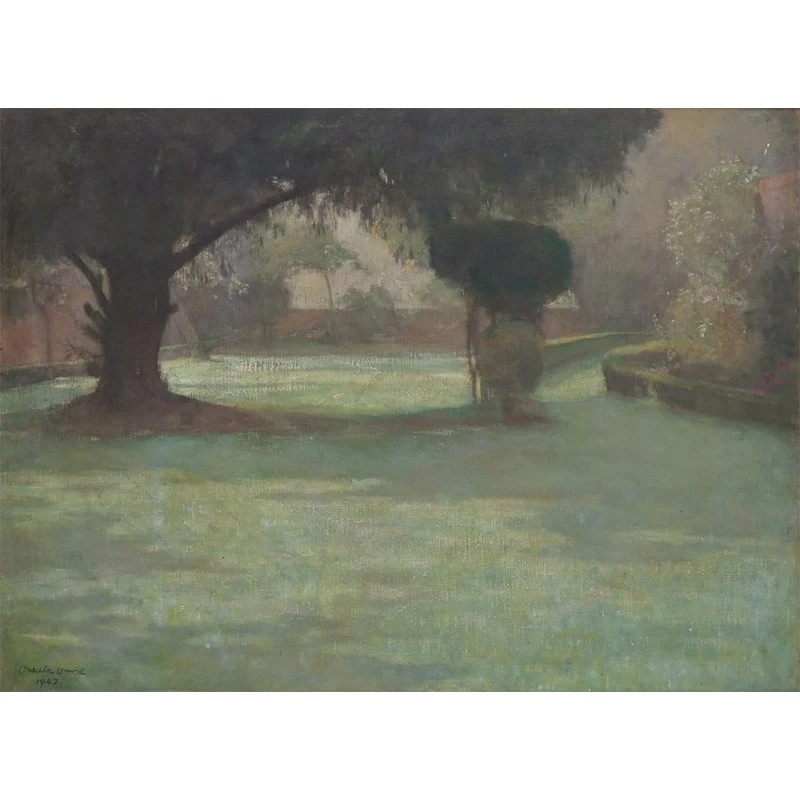
Gardens of Farnham Castle.

Wood exhibited at the Royal Academy between 1890 and 1922, at the Society of Women Artists from 1892 to 1904 and at the Royal Scottish Academy in 1900 and at the Royal Glasgow Institute of the Fine Arts in 1921.

Ursula Wood died on 20 November 1956 in the village of Farnham in Surrey where she had lived for some years.
