= Mary Vivian Hughes =

British educator and author

Mary Vivian Hughes (2 October 1866 – May 1956), usually known as Molly Hughes and published under M. V. Hughes, was a British educator and author.

== Life ==
Born Mary Thomas, she passed most of her childhood in Canonbury, at 1 Canonbury Park North (no longer standing), under the watchful eyes of four older brothers. Her father, a modestly successful London stockbroker, was found dead on a train line in November 1879. His death remains a mystery. She attended the North London Collegiate School and the Cambridge Training College for Women, and was later awarded her BA in London.

As head of the training department at Bedford College from 1892 until 1897, she played an important role in expanding and rationalising the teacher-training curriculum.

Molly Thomas married a barrister, Arthur Hughes (1857–1918), from Garneddwen, in 1897, after an engagement of nearly ten years. They had one daughter, Mary Yetta Bronwen, born in the spring of 1898 who died soon after her first birthday in 1899, and then three sons :

- Idris Vivian (born 1900);
- Alfred Barnholt (born 1904);
- Arthur Henry (born 1908)

After her husband's death she returned to work as an educational inspector and settled in Cuffley in Hertfordshire. Her first book, About England, was published in 1927.

She died in Johannesburg, South Africa in 1956.

== Reputation ==
Hughes is best known for a series of four memoirs, A London Child of the 1870s (1934), A London Girl of the 1880s (1936), A London Home in the 1890s (1937), and A London Family Between the Wars (1940). Hughes's stated purpose in these books is "to show that Victorian children did not have such a dull time as is usually supposed". Her books are a valuable source on women's education and women's work in the late Victorian period; in particular, A London Girl of the 1880s provides an unparalleled portrait of life in a Victorian women's college. The Encyclopedia of British Women's Writing, 1900-1950 notes "She has received no attention from critics."

== Published works ==
- The King of Kings (1903), with illustrations by Hughes' lifelong friend Ursula Wood (artist)
- [With M.M. Penstone] The Story of Christ's First Missioners: Biographical Lessons on the Acts of the Apostles Intended for Use with Scholars Between the Ages of Eleven and Fourteen nd (1910), National Society's Depository.
- [With Walter Ripman] A Rapid Latin Course (1923)
- [With Walter Ripman] A Latin Reader (1925)
- About England (1927)
- America's England (1930)
- London at Home (1931)
- City Saints (1932)
- A London Child of the 1870s (1934) (Republished in 2005 by Persephone Books)
- Vivians (1935)
- A London Girl of the 1880s (1936)
- A London Home in the 1890s (1937)
- Scripture Teaching Today (1939)
- A London Family Between the Wars (1940)
- From Baptism to Holy Communion: Lessons on the Church Catechism (1951)
