= Morben =

Village in Powys, Wales

Coordinates: 52.5776°N 3.9033°W

- Location within Powys
- OS grid reference: SN711994
- Principal area: Powys
- Preserved county: Powys
- Country: Wales
- Sovereign state: United Kingdom
- Police: Dyfed-Powys
- Fire: Mid and West Wales
- Ambulance: Welsh
- UK Parliament: Montgomeryshire and Glyndŵr
- Senedd Cymru – Welsh Parliament: Montgomeryshire

Morben is a hamlet in northern Powys, Wales, and was part of the historic county of Montgomeryshire (Sir Drefaldwyn) from 1536 to 1974. It lies on the Afon Dyfi and was once the home of a number of riverside quays, including Cei Ward and Y Bwtri. The site of Cei Ward lies alongside the A487 opposite Plas Llugwy, where the road, railway and river run close together. Y Bwtri lay on the bend of the river opposite Pennal and was the site of a shipyard.

== History ==
The narrow gauge Corris, Machynlleth & River Dovey Tramroad (opened 1859) carried slate from the quarries around Corris and Aberllefenni to Morben, where it was loaded into ships for onward shipment. In 1863, the Aberystwith and Welsh Coast Railway built their standard gauge railway west of Machynlleth. The tramroad crossed the new line on a level crossing, and continued in use until 1869.

Inward goods offloaded at Morben included lime and coal.

== Location ==
Morben lies on the A487 trunk road from Machynlleth to Aberystwyth. Plas Morben stands on the hillside above the road, while Morben Isaf caravan park lies between the road and the river.
