= Corris =

Village in Gwynedd, Wales

- Church at Corris

- Location within Gwynedd
- OS grid reference: SH755078
- Community: Corris
- Principal area: Gwynedd
- Preserved county: Gwynedd
- Country: Wales
- Sovereign state: United Kingdom
- Post town: MACHYNLLETH
- Postcode district: SY20
- Dialling code: 0165473
- Police: North Wales
- Fire: North Wales
- Ambulance: Welsh
- UK Parliament: Dwyfor Meirionnydd
- Senedd Cymru – Welsh Parliament: Dwyfor Meirionnydd
- List of places UK Wales Gwynedd 52.653°N 3.841°W Map of the community

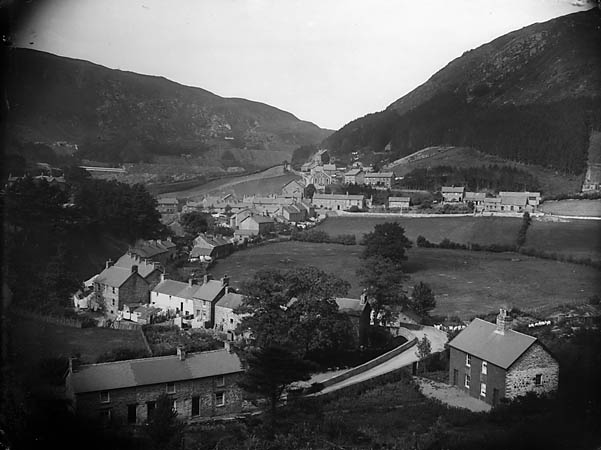
Corris circa 1885

Corris is a village in the county of Gwynedd, Wales, about 4.5 miles (7 km) north of the town of Machynlleth. The village lies on the west bank of the Afon Dulas (which here forms the boundary with Powys), around that river's confluence with the Afon Deri. Corris railway station is the headquarters and museum of the Corris Railway, a preserved narrow gauge railway.

The area has a community council. The community council system replaced the former parish council system and tackles local issues, as well as acting as a contact point between local government and residents for information and resources on various issues. The community elects one member to represent the Corris/Mawddwy ward on Gwynedd Council. Besides Corris, the ward covers Mawddwy community to the north-east.

== Buildings and architecture ==
=== Former Vicarage ===
The former vicarage for Holy Trinity Church, Corris, was commissioned in the 1870s and designed by the architect Henry Kennedy (1814–1896), who undertook extensive ecclesiastical and parochial work across north-west Wales during the nineteenth century. A tender notice for the construction of the Corris vicarage was published in 1874.

The vicarage occupies a hillside position above the A487 between Corris and Machynlleth. Historically, it was approached from the village by a footpath along the slope overlooking the Dulas valley. The building reflects Kennedy's characteristic approach to rural clerical residences, combining practical siting with the broader programme of parish development in Gwynedd during the late Victorian period.

The Church in Wales sold the property in 1973 for £11,000, after which it was converted into a public house. In the late twentieth and early twenty-first century it returned to use as an accommodation venue, making the building accessible to the public once again.

== Notable people ==
- Edward Hurst Davies (1855–1927) Quarry manager and owner
- Rhisiart Morgan Davies (1903–1958) Welsh physicist
- Herbert Harold Disley quarry manager and father of John Disley.
- John Disley (1928–2016), Olympic medal winning athlete
- Kathy Jones (born 1968), Anglican priest and Dean of Bangor

Preceding station	Heritage railways	Following station
Maespoeth Junction	Corris Railway	Terminus
	Historical railways	
Maespoeth Junction	Corris Railway	Garneddwen
