= List of Cardiff University people =

This is a list of notable alumni and staff of Cardiff University and its predecessor institutions

== Heads of state and government ==
- Faisal Al-Fayez – Prime Minister of Jordan

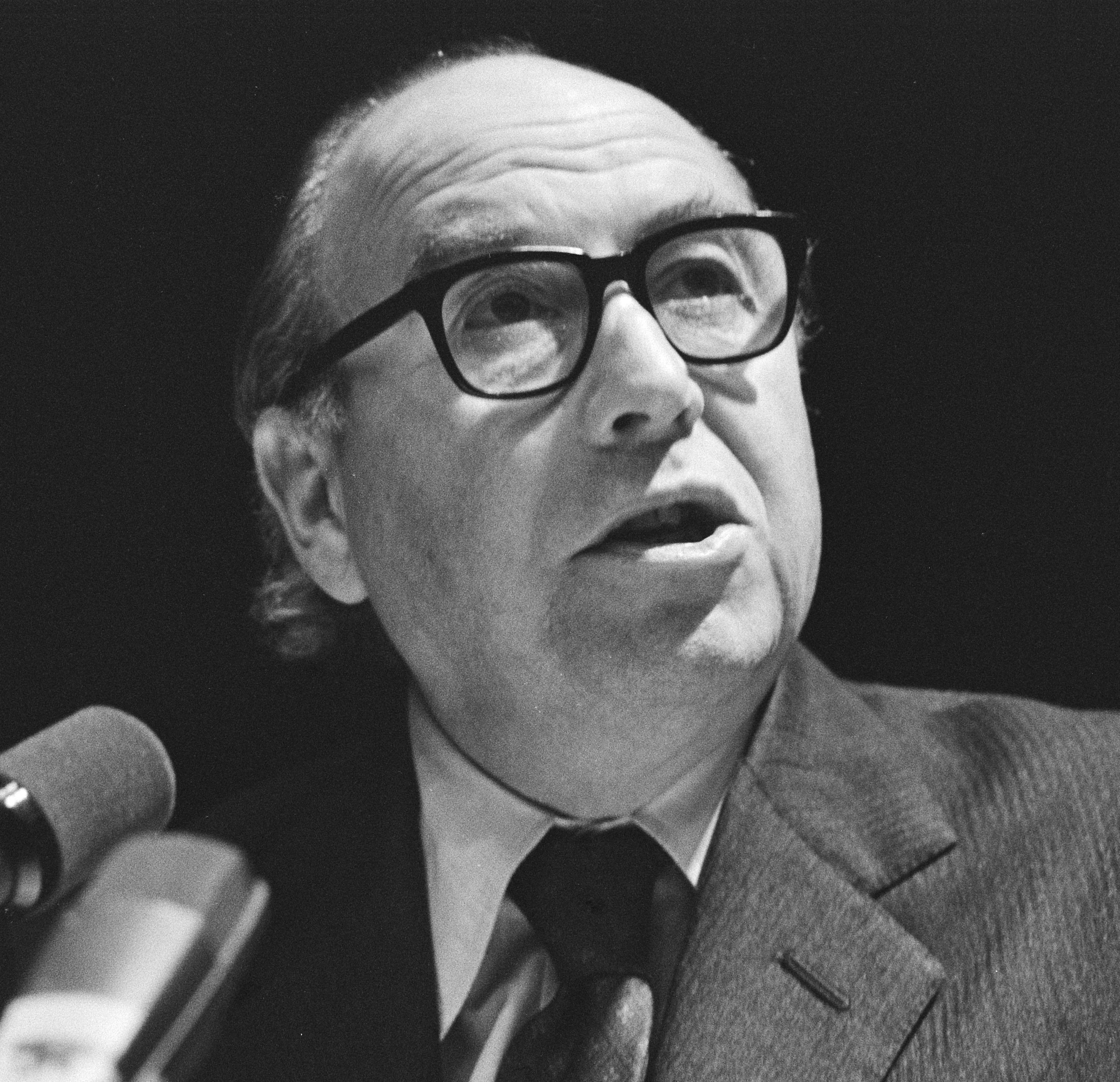
Roy Jenkins – former President of the European Commission

- Barham Salih – Former president of Iraq, former prime minister of the Iraqi Kurdistan Region and former deputy prime minister of the Iraqi federal government
- Mark Drakeford – First Minister of Wales
- Vaughan Gething – First Minister of Wales

== Politics ==
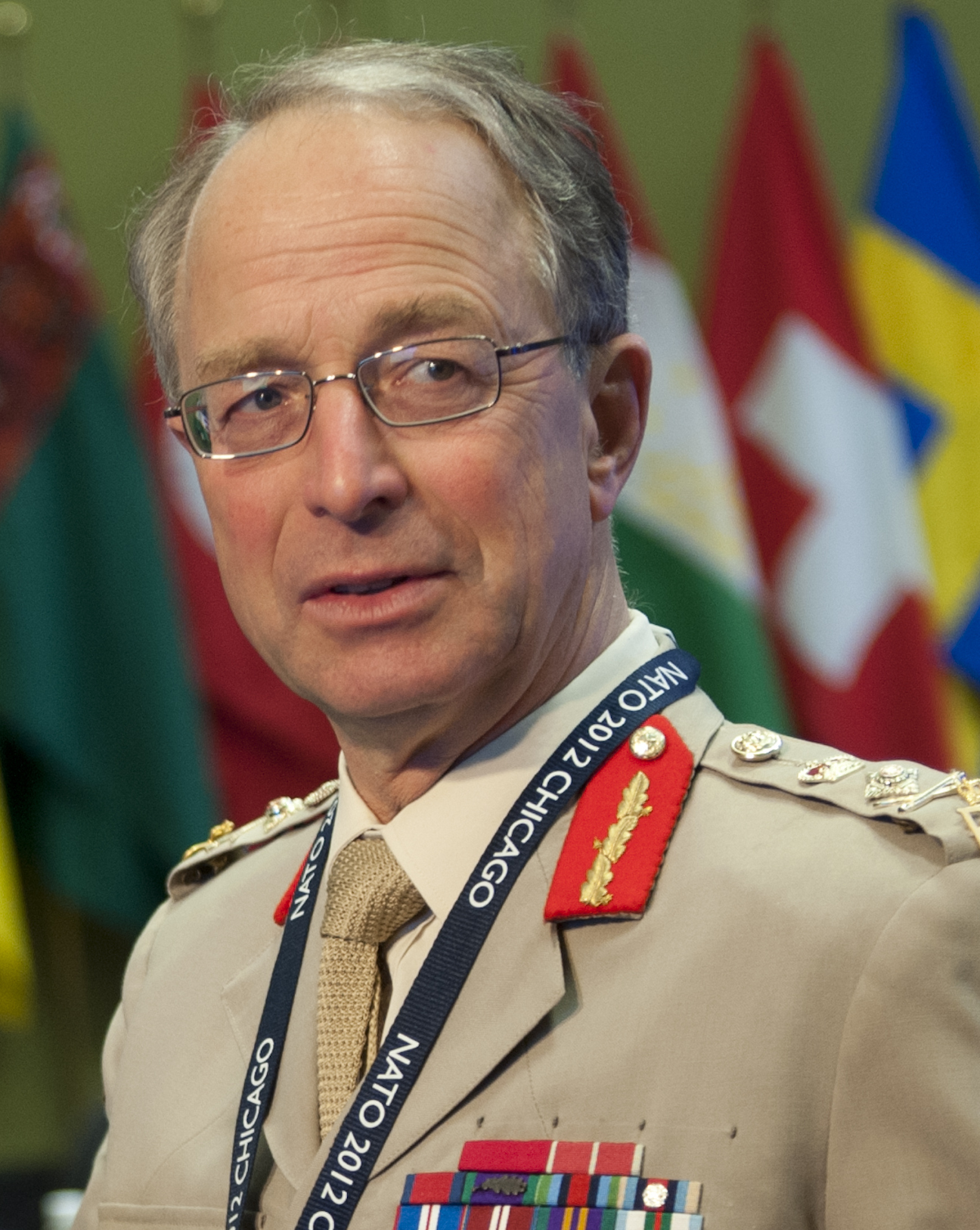
David Richards, Chief of the Defence Staff

- David Bahati – State Minister of Finance for Planning in the Cabinet of Uganda
- Christine Chapman – MS for Cynon Valley
- Jeffrey Cuthbert – Gwent Police and Crime Commissioner, MS for Caerphilly and Welsh Government Minister for Communities and Tackling Poverty
- Hefin David – MS for Caerphilly
- Wayne David – MP for Caerphilly and UK Shadow Minister for Europe, Shadow Minister for Defence Procurement and Shadow Minister for the Armed Forces
- S. O. Davies – miner, trade union official and Labour Party MP
- Guto Harri – broadcaster, Communications Director for the Mayor of London
- Mike Hedges – MS for Swansea East
- Lord Jenkins, former Chancellor of the Exchequer – Home Secretary, President of the European Commission and Chancellor of the University of Oxford (did not graduate)
- Elin Jones – MS for Ceredigion, Llywydd of the Senedd and Welsh Government Minister for Rural Affairs
- Fatou Sanyang Kinteh – Gambian Minister for Women's Affairs, Children and Social Welfare
- Sir Emyr Jones Parry – British Permanent Representative to the United Nations
- Glenys Kinnock – MEP and UK Foreign Office Minister
- Neil Kinnock – MP for Bedwellty and for Islwyn, Leader of the Labour Party, Leader of the Opposition
- Hilary Marquand – MP for Cardiff East and Minister for Health.
- Robert Minhinnick – co-founder of Friends of the Earth (Cymru)
- Christopher Walter Monckton, 3rd Viscount Monckton of Brenchley – advisor to Margaret Thatcher
- Craig Oliver – Conservative Party Director of Communications
- Adam Price – MS and leader of Plaid Cymru
- Bill Rammell – MP for Harlow
- David Rees – MS for Aberavon and Deputy Presiding Officer of the Senedd Cymru.
- Lord Richards – Chief of the Defence Staff
- Michael Shrimpton – barrister, politician, and conspiracy theorist
- John Smith – MP for the Vale of Glamorgan, member of the Defence Select Committee
- Victoria Starmer – Wife of Sir Keir Starmer, solicitor, and NHS occupational health worker.
- Brian Wilson – MP for Cunninghame North and Minister of State
- Mike Wood – MP for Dudley South

== University administrators ==
- C. W. L. Bevan – Principal of the University College of South Wales and Monmouthshire 1966–1972; Principal of University College Cardiff 1972–1987
- Leszek Borysiewicz – Vice Chancellor of the University of Cambridge
- David Grant – Vice Chancellor of University of Wales Cardiff 2001–2005; Vice Chancellor of Cardiff University 2005–2012
- Ernest Howard Griffiths – Principal of the University College of South Wales and Monmouthshire 1901–1918
- John Viriamu Jones – Principal of the University College of South Wales and Monmouthshire 1883–1901
- Frederick Rees – Principal of the University College of South Wales and Monmouthshire 1929–1949
- Colin Riordan – Vice Chancellor of Cardiff University since 2012
- Brian Smith – Principal of University of Wales College Cardiff 1988–1996; Vice Chancellor of University of Wales Cardiff 1996–2001
- Anthony Steel – Principal of the University College of South Wales and Monmouthshire 1949–1966
- Sir Aubrey Trotman-Dickenson – Principal of the University of Wales Institute of Science and Technology 1968–1988; Principal of University of Wales College Cardiff 1988–1993

== Academics ==
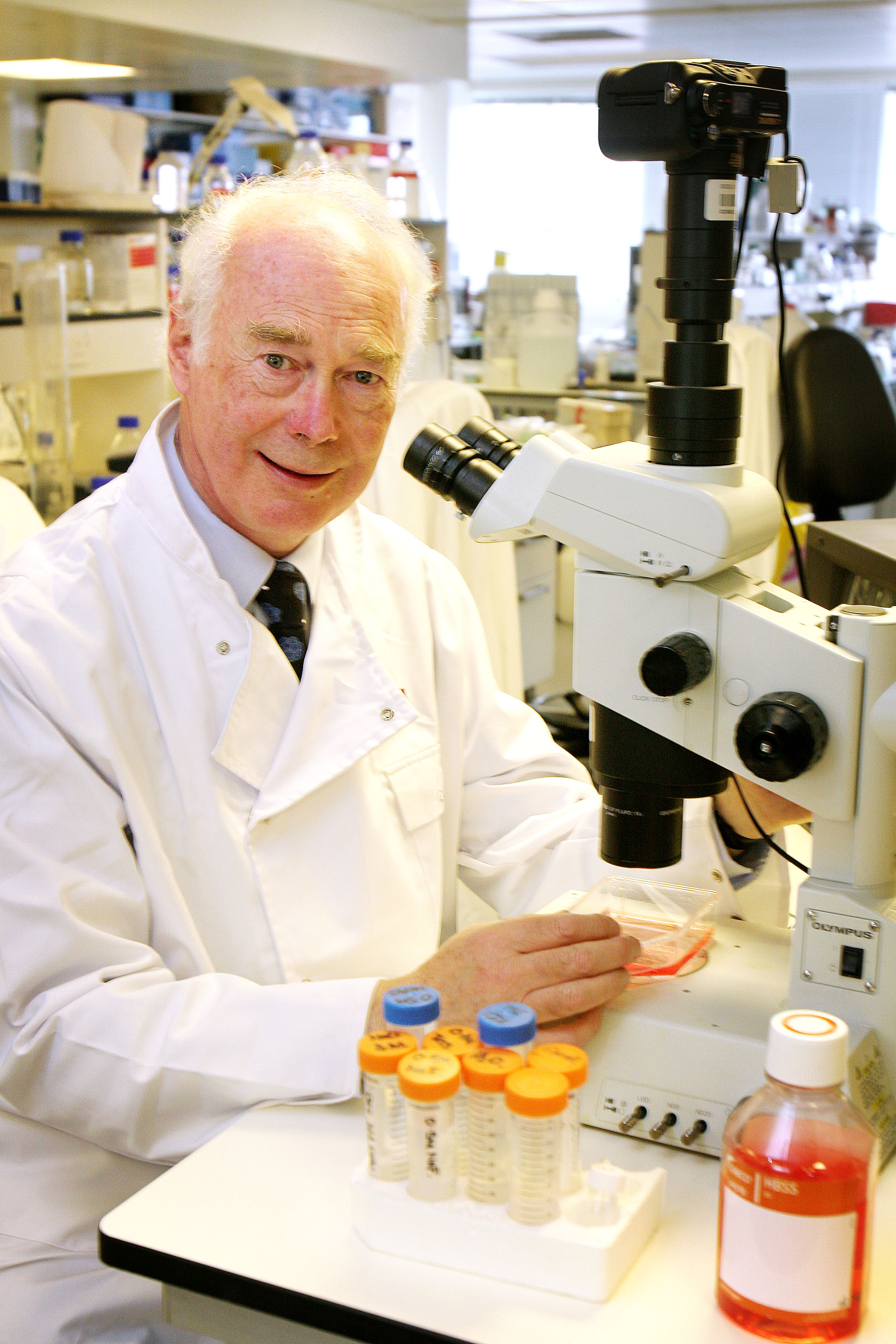
Martin Evans, Nobel Laureate in Physiology or Medicine

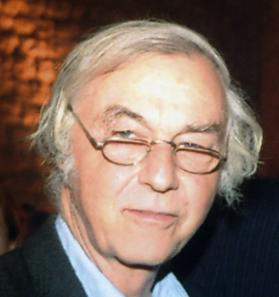
Robert Huber, Nobel Laureate in Chemistry

- Abedelnasser Abulrob – medical researcher
- Miguel Alcubierre – Mexican theoretical physicist
- Rudolf K. Allemann – Swiss biochemist
- Gabrielle Allen – computer scientist
- Robin Attfield – philosopher
- Martin J. Ball – Emeritus Professor of Linguistics at Bangor University, Cymru/Wales
- Paul E. A. Barbier – Professor of French at the University of Leeds
- Jason Barker – professor
- Yehuda Bauer – Professor of Holocaust Studies at the Avraham Harman Institute of Contemporary Jewry at the Hebrew University of Jerusalem
- Archie Cochrane – pioneer of scientific method in medicine
- Peter Coles – Professor of Astrophysics
- David Crouch – historian
- Alun Davies – bioscientist
- Huw Dixon – economist
- Stephen Dunnett – neuroscientist
- Alice Laura Embleton – biologist, zoologist and suffragist.
- Martin Evans – Nobel Prize for Medicine 2007
- Mahmoud Ezzamel – professorial fellow
- Dimitra Fimi – writer
- Brian J. Ford – Honorary fellow of Cardiff University (1986), honorary fellow of the Linnean Society, honorary fellow of the Royal Microscopical Society.
- John S. Fossey – Professor of synthetic chemistry at the University of Birmingham
- Burt Goldberg – university professor, microbiologist
- Karen Holford – engineer
- Robert Huber – Professor of Chemistry, Nobel Laureate in Chemistry 1988
- John Loughlin – Professor of Politics
- Vaughan Lowe – Chichele Professor of Public International Law in the University of Oxford
- Ursula Masson – women's history and feminism
- Angela Mihai – mathematician
- Patrick Minford – Professor of Applied Economics
- John Warwick Montgomery – American lawyer and theologian; Distinguished Research Professor of Philosophy and Christian Thought at Patrick Henry College
- Christopher Norris – literary critic
- Keith Peters – Regius Professor of Physic in the University of Cambridge
- Leighton Durham Reynolds – Emeritus Professor of Classical Languages and Literature, University of Oxford
- Alice Roberts – clinical anatomist and osteoarchaeologist
- Wendy Sadler – physicist and science communicator
- H. W. Lloyd Tanner – Professor of Mathematics and Astronomy (1883–1909)
- Pamela Taylor – Professor of Forensic Psychiatry since 2004
- Meena Upadhyaya – medical geneticist
- Keith Ward – philosopher, Gresham Professor of Divinity, Gresham College
- Chandra Wickramasinghe – mathematician, astronomer and astrobiologist, Professor of Applied Mathematics
- Rheinallt Nantlais Williams – professor of the philosophy of religion, principal of the United Theological College, Aberystwyth
- Emma Yhnell – biomedical research scientist

== Business ==
- Spencer Dale – Chief economist, Bank of England
- Andrew Gould – chairman and former CEO, Schlumberger
- Philip Jansen - former CEO of BT and Worldpay
- Martin Lewis – personal finance journalist, television presenter and website entrepreneur
- Dame Mary Perkins – co-founder, Specsavers
- Ceri Powell – senior Royal Dutch Shell executive
- John Pettigrew (businessman) – CEO, National Grid plc
- Lorenzo Simonelli – CEO, Baker Hughes Company
- Terry Smith – British Fund Manager, Fundsmith

== Religion ==
- Gregory Cameron – Bishop of St Asaph
- Sheila Cameron – lawyer and ecclesiastical judge
- Paul Colton – Bishop of Cork, Cloyne and Ross
- Vicentia Kgabe (Bishop) - Diocese_of_Lesotho
- Dominic Walker – Bishop of Monmouth

== Sport ==
- Nathan Cleverly – professional boxer and former WBO light heavyweight world champion
- Gareth Davies – former Wales and British and Irish Lions international rugby union player, and current chief executive of Cardiff Rugby Football Club
- Gerald Davies – former Wales and British and Irish Lions international rugby union player
- Alex Gough – Squash player
- Mike Hall – former Wales and British and Irish Lions international rugby union player
- Heather Knight – English cricketer
- Steven Outerbridge – Bermudian cricketer
- Jamie Roberts – Wales and British and Irish Lions international rugby union player
- James Tomlinson – English cricketer
- Bradley Wadlan – Welsh cricketer

== Arts and journalism ==
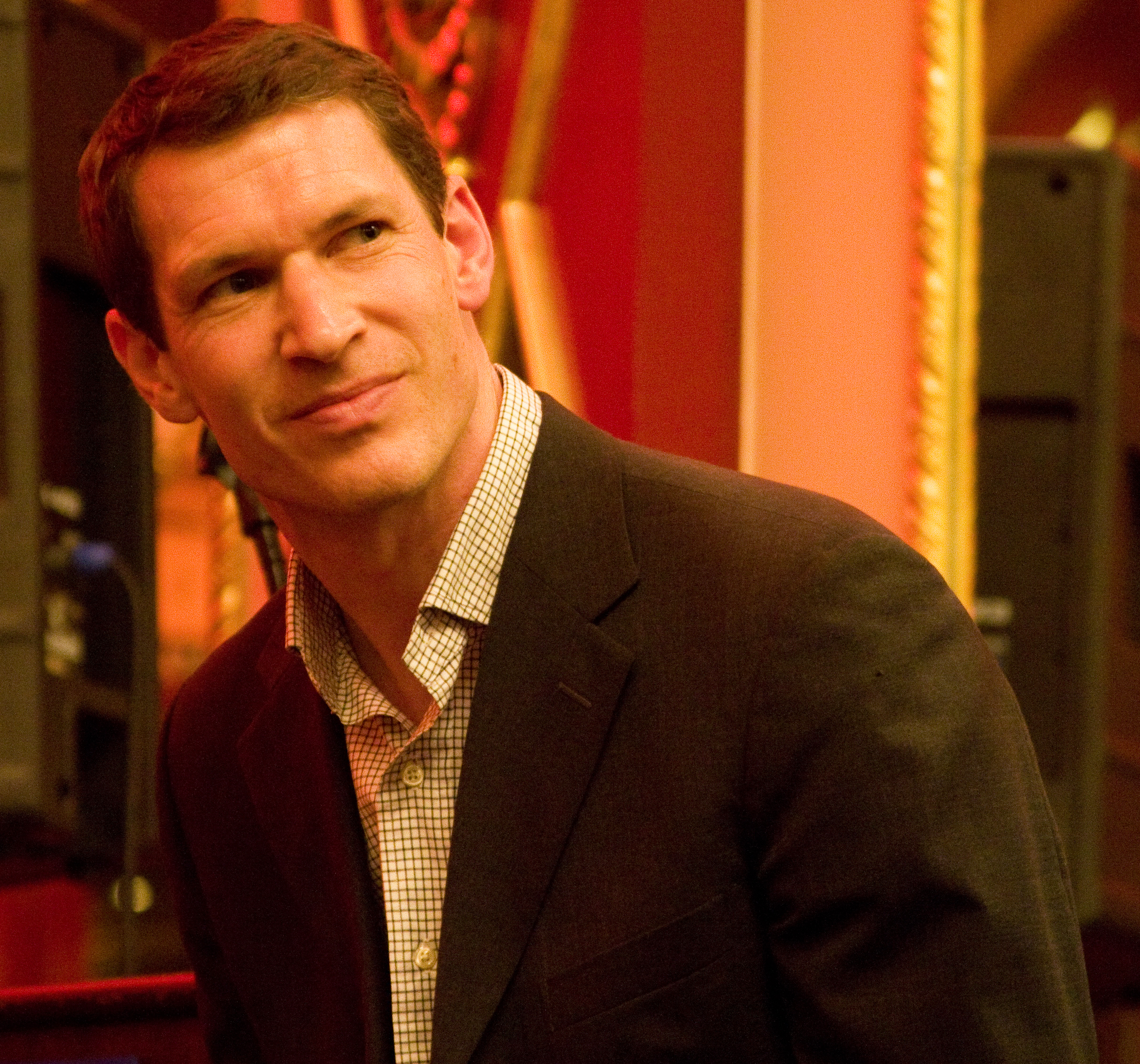
Tim Hetherington, nominee of the Academy Award for Best Documentary Feature in 2011

- Paul Atherton – television and film producer and director
- Matt Barbet – journalist
- Manish Bhasin – journalist and television presenter
- Nick Broomfield – documentary filmmaker and receiver of the BAFTA Lifetime Achievement Award for Contribution to Documentary
- Philip Cashian – composer
- Suw Charman-Anderson – journalist and social software consultant.
- Adrian Chiles – television presenter
- Gillian Clarke – poet and receiver of the Queen's Gold Medal for Poetry
- Huw Edwards – journalist and BBC newsreader
- Ken Elias – artist/painter
- Max Foster – CNN anchor, CNN Today
- Shihab Ghanem - poet
- M. A. Griffiths – poet
- Julia Hartley-Brewer – journalist and television presenter
- Jiang Heping – executive director of the CCTV Sports Programming Centre and Controller of CCTV-5
- Tim Hetherington – photo-journalist and co-director of Academy Award-nominated Restrepo
- Alun Hoddinott – composer
- Chris Jackson - photographer
- Elis James – stand-up comedian and actor
- Sioned James – choral conductor
- Karl Jenkins – composer
- Alan Johnston – journalist
- Riz Khan – journalist and television interviewer
- Bernard Knight – crime writer
- Simon Lane – co-founder and Creative director of The Yogscast Ltd
- Gwilym Lee – actor.
- Siân Lloyd – television presenter
- Los Campesinos! – six piece indie pop band
- Philip Madoc – actor
- Paul Moorcraft – writer
- Sharon Morgan – actress
- Joanna Natasegara – documentary producer, Academy Award winner for Netflix documentary The White Helmets
- Siân Phillips – actress
- Susanna Reid – television presenter
- James Righton – musician
- Leo Rowlands – Welsh musical composer, Catholic priest
- Arlene Sierra – composer
- Ron Smerczak – actor
- Mari Strachan – novelist and librarian
- Richard Tait – former BBC governor and BBC trustee
- Craig Thomas – author
- Alex Thomson – journalist & television presenter
- Vedhicka – Indian actress
- Grace Williams – composer
