= Everywoman (organisation) =

Women's professional organization

everywoman
- Founders: Karen Gill MBE Maxine Benson MBE
- Purpose: Closing the gender gap - through powering businesses to accelerate their gender inclusion goals and powering women to accelerate their success.
- Region served: Global
- Website: www.everywoman.com

Everywoman (stylized in all lowercase) is a membership organization based in the United Kingdom that advocates for advancement of women in business to close the gender pay gap. It provides personal development resources, leadership training, events, award programmes, networking opportunities and inspiration for women in business and female entrepreneurs. It works closely with government, opinion formers and business support organisations, with sponsors including Bupa, NatWest and Specsavers.

== Background ==
It was founded in September 1999 by Karen Gill and Maxine Benson, after they felt frustrated with the lack of resources available for women in business. Karen Gill and Maxine Benson were awarded MBEs in the New Year's Honours 2009 for their services to women's enterprise.

== Everywoman Events ==
The everywoman Entrepreneur Awards everywoman's flagship awards programme, launched in 2003 recognises the achievements of women business owners, and in the past has rewarded high-profile women such as Elle Macpherson, Judy Murray, Charlotte Tilbury, Dame Stella Rimington and Dame Mary Perkins, founder of Specsavers.

Bupa everywoman in Technology Awards were launched to demonstrate that the profession holds a wealth of career opportunities for women, aiming to shine the spotlight on women who are enjoying successful careers.

everywoman in Transport & Logistics Awards launched in 2008 with the aim to break down stereotypes and creating industry role models in a traditionally male dominated industry.

everywoman in Insurance Forum launched in 2019 as a networking and learning and development for women in the Insurance Industry.

everywoman Global Summit launched in 2021 with a focus on equipping teams to achieve their ESG and gender inclusion goals.

Specsavers everywoman in Retail Ambassadors Programme ran from 2006 to 2019 and showcased the female talent working at the top of the retail industry. It also showcased the range of career opportunities that retail can offer women beyond only the shop floor.

The everywoman in Travel Awards ran from 2017 to 2019 and celebrated women working within the travel industry.

== Modern Muse ==
In November 2010, everywoman launched the Modern Muse project, designed to engage the next generation of female business leaders and entrepreneurs by showcasing women of today in all walks of business life, running a schools outreach programme offering work experience, internships, career advice and mentorship. Its goal was to reach out to one million young women and girls to inspire them to look at business careers and entrepreneurship.

In 2021 the Trustees determined that the schools outreach programme would cease and the role of Modern Muse would be to support organisations with a shared mission: The Prince's Trust, which helps young people access training and jobs, and TechSheCan, whose mission is to level the gender playing field in the technology space.
