= Catrin Feelings =

Welsh drag performer

- Born: Ellis Lloyd Jones; 1998 or 1999 (age 27–28); Treorchy, Wales
- Education: Cardiff University
- Occupation: Drag performer
- Television: RuPaul's Drag Race UK (series 7)

Catrin Feelings is the stage name of Ellis Lloyd Jones, a Welsh drag performer known for competing on the seventh series (2025) of the reality show RuPaul's Drag Race UK.

== Early life and education ==
Jones was born to Andrea and Kev Jones in Treorchy in the Rhondda Valley, where he was subsequently raised. As a child, he found himself not fitting into the gender norms of other boys his age, which left him feeling ostracised by his peers. Despite this, Jones' family remained supportive of him throughout his life. Jones came out as gay when he was a teenager. Jones attended Cardiff University where he studied Welsh.

== Career ==
Jones gained an interest in drag after watching RuPaul's Drag Race during the COVID-19 pandemic, and has since performed in drag throughout Wales. His first public performance in drag was made at The Queer Emporium in Cardiff. Jones’ stage name comes from a line in the Little Mix song Motivate: "I'm catching feelings ooh la, la, la, la, la, la, ayy".

Jones said to have received support from his tutors at Cardiff University in getting into the TV and radio industry through personal contacts. Jones spoke highly of his university tutors, “It was all through the university that I got that type of help, and I’m still in touch with my tutor now. They are absolutely fantastic, and I can’t fault them.”

In March 2023, Jones appeared on the S4C series Mwy Na Daffs a Taffs, where he gave Gemma Collins a tour of Treorchy.

Prior to appearing on the seventh series of RuPaul's Drag Race UK, Jones has performed as Catrin Feelings at the National Eisteddfod and Pride Cymru.

== Personal life ==
Jones currently resides in Cardiff. He has more than 200,000 followers on TikTok.

== Filmography ==
=== Television ===
| Year | Programme | Channel | Role | Notes |
|---|---|---|---|---|
| 2021 | Canu Gyda Fy Arwr | S4C | As Ellis Lloyd Jones | Series 1, episode 1; appearing alongside Elin Fflur. |
| 2022 | Young, Welsh and Bossin’ It | BBC3 | As Ellis Lloyd Jones | Episode 2. |
| 2023 | Mwy Na Daffs a Taffs | S4C | As Ellis Lloyd Jones | Guest appearance in the episode that also featured Gemma Collins. |
| 2025 | RuPaul's Drag Race UK | BBC3 / World of Wonder | As Catrin Feelings | Season 7 - Joint 3rd place. |

== See also ==
- List of Cardiff University people
- List of drag queens
- List of people from Cardiff
