= Doug Perkins =

Welsh businessman

Doug Perkins CBE
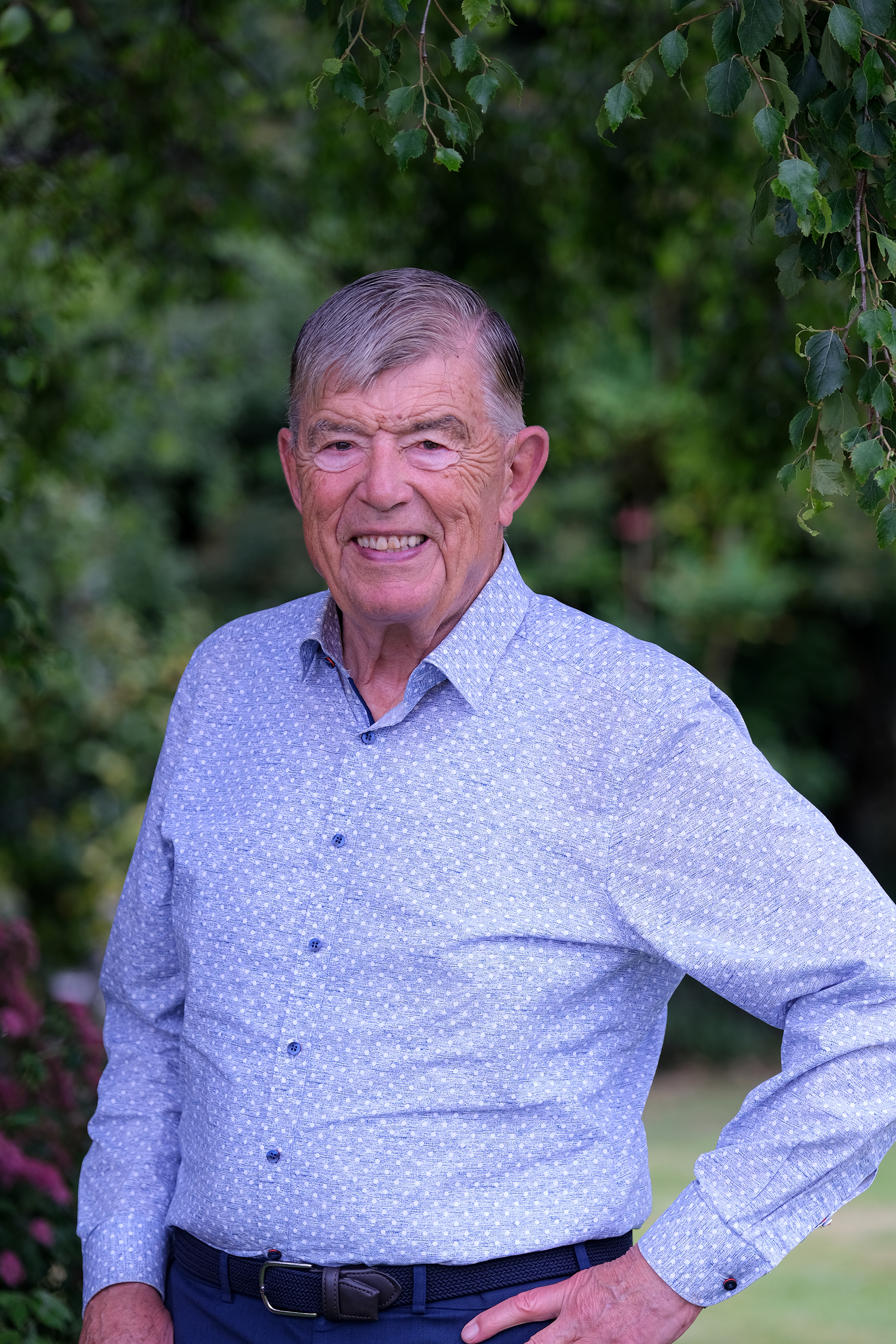
- Perkins in 2026
- Born: April 1943 (age 83); Llanelli, Carmarthenshire, Wales
- Education: Llanelli Boys Grammar School
- Alma mater: Cardiff University
- Occupation: Businessman
- Known for: co-founder of Specsavers
- Spouse: Mary Perkins
- Children: 3

Douglas John David Perkins CBE (born April 1943) is a Welsh billionaire businessman. He is the co-founder of Specsavers, an international optical and audiology retail chain.

== Early life ==
Douglas John David Perkins was born in April 1943 in Llanelli, Carmarthenshire, Wales. His father was a policeman and his grandparents were farmers in the county. He was educated at the Llanelli Boys Grammar School, and he graduated from Cardiff University, where he met his wife, Mary Perkins.

== Career ==
Perkins began his career as an optometrist in Llanelli and Carmarthen. In the 1970s, he took over his father-in-law's optician store in Bristol and subsequently opened 22 stores. The couple sold the chain for £2 million in 1980 and moved to Guernsey, where Mary's father had retired.

Perkins co-founded Specsavers with his wife Mary in 1984. The company became an international chain of opticians, making them both billionaires. In The Sunday Times Rich List 2026, Mary and Doug Perkins and family were ranked 117th in the list of Britain's Wealthiest People, with their personal worth estimated at £1.409 billion. In The Sunday Times Tax List 2026, they were ranked tenth, having paid £121.7 million in tax.

In 2023, Mary and Doug Perkins placed Specsavers into a family trust, stating that they did not want their children to sell the business to private equity.

Perkins was appointed a Commander of the Order of the British Empire in the King's Birthday Honours List in 2025, in recognition of his services to business and trade.

== Personal life ==
Perkins lives in Guernsey with his wife Mary. They have a son, John, and two daughters, Cathy and Julie.
