= Brain Research Bulletin =

- Discipline: Neuroscience
- Language: English
- Edited by: Andres Buonanno

Publication details
- History: 1976–present
- Publisher: Elsevier
- Frequency: 18/year
- Impact factor: 4.077 (2020)

Standard abbreviations
- ISO 4: Brain Res. Bull.

Indexing
- CODEN: BRBUDU
- ISSN: 0361-9230 (print); 1873-2747 (web)
- LCCN: 76644756
- OCLC no.: 02134161

Links
- Journal homepage; Online access

Brain Research Bulletin is a peer-reviewed scientific journal covering neuroscience. It was established in 1976 with Matthew J. Wayner (then at Syracuse University) as founding editor in chief. Later it was edited by Stephen Dunnett (Cardiff University). He was succeeded in 2010 by Andres Buonanno (National Institute of Child Health and Human Development). It is published 18 times per year by Elsevier.

== Abstracting and indexing ==
The journal is abstracted and indexed in BIOSIS Previews, Current Contents/Life Sciences, Embase, Elsevier Biobase, MEDLINE, PsycINFO, PsycLIT, Science Citation Index, and Scopus. According to the Journal Citation Reports, it has a 2020 impact factor of 4.077.
