= Bjørge Lillelien =

Norwegian sports journalist and commentator (1927–1987)

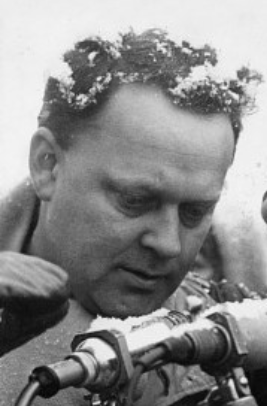
- Lillelien in 1962.
- Born: Roar Bjørge Lillelien; 29 March 1927; Slemmestad, Norway
- Died: 26 October 1987 (aged 60); Oslo, Norway
- Education: Northwestern University
- Occupations: Football and winter sports commentator
- Employer: NRK
- Spouse: Aud Karin Flesche (m. 1956)
- Children: 2

Roar Bjørge Lillelien (29 March 1927 – 26 October 1987) was a Norwegian sports journalist and commentator for the Norwegian Broadcasting Corporation. He was considered to be a popular and engaging personality who commentated on many sports, particularly winter sports and football. It was not unusual for Norwegians to turn off the sound on the TV and listen to him on the radio instead.

In September 1981, Lillelien came to international prominence when he called out on the radio: "Maggie Thatcher, can you hear me? ... Maggie Thatcher, your boys took a hell of a beating! Your boys took a hell of a beating!" in jubilation after Norway's 2–1 victory over England in a World Cup qualifier on 9 September 1981.

== Career ==
Lillelien went to Northwestern University to study journalism in 1948. After going back to Norway for his military service, he got a job in the newspaper Fremtiden, after which he joined the Norwegian broadcasting network.

In 1963 he began a long-term working relationship with former Olympic champion skier Håkon Brusveen at a cross country ski race at Holmenkollen. This collaboration would last for the rest of Lillelien's working days. Brusveen continued to work for NRK after Lillelien's death.

Although privately Lillelien was quite reserved and reflective, he developed a gregarious on-air persona. He said: "We shouldn't necessarily make a boring radio programme even if it is a boring football match. We should make a sports show that excites people".

He continued to work in broadcasting until just before his death from cancer in 1987.

=== "Your boys took a hell of a beating" comment ===
Lillelien commentated on radio on Norway's 2–1 victory against England in Oslo on 9 September 1981 in a UEFA Group 4 qualifier for the 1982 World Cup. At the end of the match, alternating between the English and Norwegian languages, he exultantly proclaimed amidst scenes of jubilant Norway supporters and players in the football stadium:

"We are best in the world! We have beaten England! England, birthplace of giants", before taunting a roll call of English historical figures:

"Lord Nelson, Lord Beaverbrook, Sir Winston Churchill, Sir Anthony Eden, Clement Attlee, Henry Cooper, Lady Diana, vi har slått dem alle sammen, vi har slått dem alle sammen! [we have beaten them all, we have beaten them all!]. Maggie Thatcher, can you hear me? Maggie Thatcher ... your boys took a hell of a beating! Your boys took a hell of a beating!"

Although the broadcast was initially meant solely for the Norwegian home audience, its content soon became legendary in the history of sports commentary. In 2002 it topped a list of the "10 greatest bits of commentary ever" in The Observer newspaper.

==== Full Norwegian/English version ====
The full Norwegian/English version reads as follows:

"Vi er best i verden! Vi er best i verden! Vi har slått England 2–1 i fotball!! Det er aldeles utrolig! Vi har slått England! England, kjempers fødeland. Lord Nelson, Lord Beaverbrook, Sir Winston Churchill, Sir Anthony Eden, Clement Attlee, Henry Cooper, Lady Diana—vi har slått dem alle sammen. Vi har slått dem alle sammen.

"Maggie Thatcher can you hear me? Maggie Thatcher, jeg har et budskap til deg midt under valgkampen. Jeg har et budskap til deg: Vi har slått England ut av Verdensmesterskapet i fotball. Maggie Thatcher, som de sier på ditt språk i boksebarene rundt Madison Square Garden i New York: Your boys took a hell of a beating! Your boys took a hell of a beating!"

==== Translated version ====
The full version, completely translated to English:

"We are the best in the world! We are the best in the world! We have beaten England 2–1 in football!! It is completely unbelievable! We have beaten England! England, birthplace of giants. Lord Nelson, Lord Beaverbrook, Sir Winston Churchill, Sir Anthony Eden, Clement Attlee, Henry Cooper, Lady Diana—we have beaten them all. We have beaten them all.

"Maggie Thatcher can you hear me? Maggie Thatcher, I have a message for you in the middle of the election campaign. (Note: The election campaign was the Norwegian parliamentary election of 1981, which was held on 13 and 14 September of that year.) I have a message for you: We have knocked England out of the football World Cup. (Note: In fact England went on to qualify for the finals, while Norway were eliminated, eventually finishing bottom of the qualification group.) Maggie Thatcher, as they say in your language in the boxing bars around Madison Square Garden in New York: Your boys took a hell of a beating! Your boys took a hell of a beating!"

==== Parodies and homages ====
In 2002 Lillelien's words were designated the greatest piece of sports commentary ever by The Observer's Sport Monthly magazine. Such is its place in British sporting culture that parodies of the commentary have been written to celebrate domestic sporting victories, such as the following when the England cricket team beat Australia to regain the Ashes in September 2005:

"Kylie Minogue! Steve Irwin! Holly Valance! Crocodile Dundee! Natalie Imbruglia! Ian Thorpe! Mrs. Mangel! Can you hear me? Your boys took one hell of a beating!"

And again, when England's cricket team finally won a game against New Zealand in the 2006/7 one-day series, the BBC's web coverage came up with:

"Dame Kiri te Kanawa, Peter Jackson, Neil Finn, Sir Edmund Hillary, Jonah Lomu – we have beaten them all! Helen Clark, can you hear me? Your boys took one hell of a beating!"

Following Scotland's 2–1 victory against Norway in Oslo in September 2005, the Daily Record parodied the quote, using known Norwegians:

"King Olaf, Roald Amundsen, Liv Ullmann, Edvard Munch, Vidkun Quisling, Thor Heyerdahl, Henrik Ibsen, Edvard Grieg, Monty Python's Norwegian Blue, Morten Harket, and Anni-Frid from ABBA. You boys took a helluva beating!"

The deputy editor of the Daily Record at the time, Murray Foote, later issued an apology for the inclusion of Vidkun Quisling in the quotation: "While I naturally assumed Quisling was not one of Norway's favourite sons, I was truly unaware of the deep loathing his name engenders amongst your countrymen. Had I been aware of this, I would not have used his name and I apologise unreservedly for the offence it caused."

Following Manchester University winning University Challenge against the University of Cambridge Pembroke College in March 2012, a commentator for the Manchester student newspaper observed "We have beaten Pembroke College, Cambridge! Cambridge, birthplace of giants. Rab Butler, Clive James, Ted Hughes, William Pitt the Younger, Eric Idle, Peter Cook, Bill Oddie! Bill Oddie, can you hear me? Your boys took a hell of a beating!"

The speech is also parodied in the 2001 British drama film Mean Machine, starring Vinnie Jones. In the film, at the conclusion of the match between the guards and the prisoners at the fictional Longmarsh prison, in a 3–2 win for the prisoners, the commentators, Bob Likely (Jason Flemyng) and Bob Carter (Jake Abraham) quoted "Guards of Pentonville, Guards of Wandsworth, Walton nick in Liverpool, Policemen of Britain, Traffic Wardens, Parole officers, Wheel clampers, your boys have taken a helluva beating today, a helluva beating!".

During a "Phoenix from the Flames" segment of Fantasy Football League, Frank Skinner and David Baddiel visit Norway to recreate Hallvar Thoresen's winning goal against England in the 1981 qualifier. After this, Thoresen suggests they dress up and impersonate all the people listed by Lillelien (Lord Beaverbrook is represented by Thoresen in a beaver costume). Once this is done, Thoresen mentions Norway's World Cup qualifier victory against the Netherlands in 1992, and Baddiel provides a Lillelien-style commentary over archive footage of the end of the match, saying: "Vincent van Gogh, Rutger Hauer, Van der Valk, the little boy who put his finger in the dike, Martina Navratilova! Oh, no, that's wrong... That band who did "Sylvia"! Oh, what were they called? Focus, that's them! Jools Holland, probably... Tulips, some prostitutes, the mouse who lived in the windmill! Dick Van Dyke, can you hear me? Dick Van Dyke, your boys took one hell of a beating! Your boys took one hell of a beating!""

== See also ==
- Huang Jianxiang, Chinese football commentator with a similarly memorable match commentary
- Guðmundur Benediktsson, Icelandic football commentator, also with a similarly memorable match commentary

== Bibliography ==
- Lillelien, Bjørge (1985). Saken er klar! (in Norwegian). Aschehoug. ISBN 8203152120. (Limited access for URL-addresses only from Norwegian IP addresses.)
- Lillelien, Bjørge; Fossen, Tor Røste (1986). VM-boka : Mexico, Maradona og andre høydepunkter (in Norwegian). Aschehoug. ISBN 8203154107. (Limited access for URL-addresses only from Norwegian IP addresses.)
- Wirkola, Bjørn; Lillelien, Bjørge (1969). Knall og fall (in Norwegian). Cappelen. (Limited access for URL-addresses only from Norwegian IP addresses.)
