= Emma Yhnell =

British biomedical research scientist

Emma Yhnell FLSW FRSB
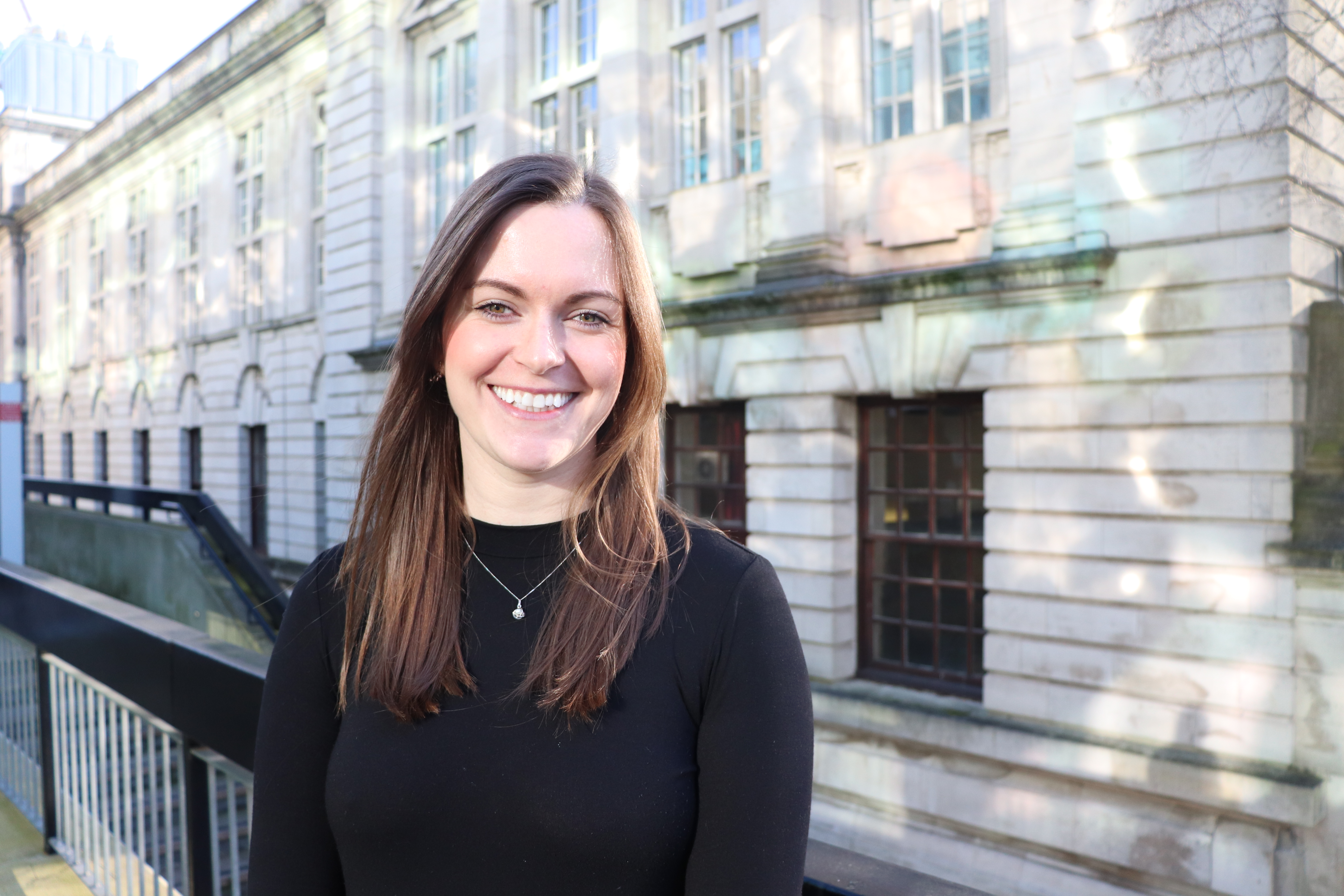
- Yhnell in 2020
- Citizenship: British
- Education: Cardiff University (BSc, PhD)
- Scientific career
- Fields: Behavioural neuroscience
- Workplaces: Cardiff University
- Thesis: A phenotypic characterisation of the HdhQ111 mouse model of Huntington’s disease (2015)
- Doctoral advisor: Stephen Dunnett; Simon Brooks
- Website: emmayhnell.com

Emma Yhnell is a British scientist, science communicator, educator, Reader and Associate Dean of Equity, Diversity and Inclusion based at Cardiff University. She has previously conducted research on computerised cognitive training and Huntington's disease. She is a science communicator, an advocate for public engagement and a committed science, technology, engineering and mathematics (STEM) ambassador.

== Early life and education ==
Yhnell attended Chosen Hill School in Gloucestershire. Yhnell then went to Cardiff University for undergraduate study and graduated with a First Class BSc Honours degree in Biochemistry. She completed her PhD, which was funded by a Medical Research Council studentship, on Behavioural Neuroscience and Huntington's disease.

Yhnell also completed a Postgraduate Certificate in Clinical Trials via distance learning through the London School of Hygiene and Tropical Medicine through her Health and Care Research Wales Independent Research Fellowship.

== Research and career ==
Following her doctoral studies, Yhnell worked as a post-doctoral researcher for the Brain Repair Group, then the Neuroscience and Mental Health Research Institute, at Cardiff University. She was named a Research Fellow in 2016, and worked as a consultant for Neem Biotechnology.

Yhnell currently works as a Reader in the School of Biosciences at Cardiff University. She is a National Teaching Fellow and Principal Fellow of the Higher Education Academy,

== Science communication and public engagement ==
Yhnell's extensive public engagement work has included presenting a two-part BBC radio series "Dementia: Hope for the Future" produced by Bengo Media, hosting series one of Health and Care Research Wales's podcast "Where Would We Be Without Research" and reviewing the Sunday papers on the BBC Radio Wales Politics show Sunday Supplement.

Her public engagement work has also included speaking at the Hay Festival of Literature & Arts, Soapbox Science (a series of events promoting women working in science), Cheltenham Science Festival, New Scientist Live and Pint of Science (a festival communicating scientific developments to the general public). Yhnell attended the Westiminster Parliament of the United Kingdom to present on the potential of using games to train the brain, to improve cognition and movement, as part of the national competition SET for Britain. She took part in the Royal Society's Pairing Scheme which aims to bring science to the attention of Parliamentarians and civil servants, she was paired with Kevin Brennan MP. She was a speaker at TEDx Cardiff University in 2017. She contributed to the book How the Brain Works: The Facts Visually Explained for the publisher Dorling Kindersley (DK).

== Senior advisory roles ==
Alongside her academic work, Yhnell holds several senior advisory roles. She is a Trustee of Amgueddfa Cymru, National Museum Wales and a Council Member to Nuffield Council on Bioethics. She sits on the Research Ethics and Integrity Council (REIC), at ALLEA, the European Federation of Academies of Sciences and Humanities, following her successful competitive nomination for the role by the Learned Society of Wales and is the United Kingdom representative to the International Brain Research Organisation Pan European Regional Committee. She has held previous roles as United Kingdom representative to the Federation of European Neuroscience Societies Communications Committee and was formerly Equity, Diversity and Inclusion Lead to the British Neuroscience Association and Wales representative to the Biochemical Society Policy Advisory Panel.

== Honours and awards ==
In 2025 Yhnell was awarded the Society for Experimental Biology Outreach, Education and Diversity Presidents Medal. In 2024, she was honoured by the Society for Neuroscience with the Science Educator Award. In 2019, Yhnell won the Welsh round of the UK Science Communication Competition Famelab and went on to compete at the UK Finals during Cheltenham Science Festival.. In 2018, Yhnell was awarded the British Science Association's Charles Darwin Award Lecture for Agricultural, Biological and Medical Sciences. Yhnell gave her award lecture at the British Science Festival in Hull in September 2018, in which she discussed her cutting edge research in Huntington's disease and its challenges, and public and patient involvement in research in using brain-training. She was awarded the British Neuroscience Association's Public Engagement Award in 2018. In 2017 she won the Young Investigator Award from the Cardiff Institute of Tissue Engineering and Repair. In the same year she was a finalist for the Womenspire Chwarae Teg Rising Star award. Yhnell won the Biochemical Society's Science Communication Competition in the Written category in 2015 for her piece "James and the Giant Gene".
