= Guðmundur Benediktsson =

Icelandic footballer, manager, and commentator

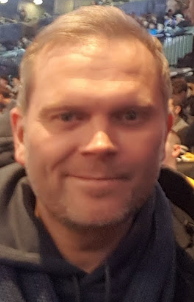
- Guðmundur in 2018

Personal information
- Date of birth: 3 September 1974 (age 52)
- Place of birth: Akureyri, Iceland
- Position: Forward

Youth career
- Þór

Senior career*
Years	Team	Apps	(Gls)
1990–1991	Þór	2	(0)
1991–1994	Germinal Ekeren	4	(0)
1994	Þór	17	(4)
1995–1999	KR	75	(32)
1999–2000	Geel	15	(4)
2000–2004	KR	53	(7)
2005–2008	Valur	70	(10)
2009	KR	20	(4)

International career
1989–1991	Iceland U17	18	(13)
1990	Iceland U19	4	(4)
1992–1995	Iceland U21	11	(3)
1994–2001	Iceland	10	(2)

Managerial career
- 2010: Selfoss
- 2011–2014: Breiðablik (assistant)
- 2014: Breiðablik
- 2014–2016: KR (assistant)
- * Club domestic league appearances and goals

Guðmundur Benediktsson nicknamed Gummi Ben (born 3 September 1974) is an Icelandic TV personality, sports commentator and former footballer and manager.

== Playing career ==
At a young age, Guðmundur attracted the attention of major foreign clubs. At 15, he was approached by teams such as Arsenal, Everton, Tottenham and Stuttgart. Later, while still 15, he ruptured his anterior cruciate ligament. After the injury, he was offered the choice of going to Stuttgart or Germinal Ekeren, opting for the latter because he believed he would get more playing time.

In 1997, he went on trial at Preston North End (which at the time was managed by David Moyes) and was offered a one-month contract which would be renewed on a monthly basis (due to Guðmundur's record of injury problems). Guðmundur rejected the deal, as he had a newborn (his son Albert) and needed more long-term security.

After a stint at Geel in 2000, Guðmundur had serious knee problems, leading him to play irregularly for Knattspyrnufélag Reykjavíkur in the subsequent years. In one season during the 2000–2004 period, he was assistant coach at KR when Willum Þór Þórsson coached the team.

He retired from playing in 2009, after which he became a football manager.

== National team career ==
He made his debut for Iceland in 1994 against the United Arab Emirates, and scored in the game. His final game for Iceland came in January 2001 against Chile.

== TV career ==
Guðmundur has commentated matches live for Icelandic television and was the commentator for Iceland's matches at UEFA Euro 2016. His enthusiastic commentary earned him international praise. One especially memorable commentary came immediately after full-time of Iceland's historic 2–1 win over England in the round of 16 (English translation given here):

This is done! This is done! We are never going home! Did you see that? Amazing! I can't believe it! This is a dream. Never wake me from this amazing dream! Live the way you want, England! Iceland is going to play France on Sunday. France–Iceland! You can go home. You can go out of Europe. You can go wherever you want. England 1 Iceland 2 is the closing score here in Nice. And the fairytale continues.

== Personal life ==
His son Albert Guðmundsson is currently with Fiorentina and is a full international.

== See also ==
- Huang Jianxiang, Chinese football commentator with a similarly memorable match commentary
- Bjørge Lillelien, Norwegian football commentator, also with a similarly memorable match commentary
