= Huang Jianxiang =

Chinese sports commentator

Huang Jianxiang (simplified Chinese: 黄健翔; traditional Chinese: 黃健翔; pinyin: Huáng Jiànxiáng; born January 20, 1968) is a Chinese sports commentator and television host. He is one of the best-known sports commentators in China, formerly of the state-run network China Central Television (CCTV). He was fairly well received in his commentating of football, particularly at the FIFA World Cup, the German Bundesliga, and the Italian Serie A. Huang has also been a principal commentator for CCTV at the Olympic Games in Atlanta 1996, 2000 Sydney, Athens 2004, Turin 2006.

Huang received widespread international attention during a World Cup commentary incident on June 26, 2006, when he commentated on the match between Australia and Italy, where he yelled passionately for several minutes in support of Italy. Huang's commentary resulted in widespread controversy and was criticized by his colleagues, online commentators, and some foreign media. He resigned from CCTV in November 2006. Since resigning, Huang has worked for a wide variety of Chinese satellite TV stations, including Hong Kong–based Phoenix TV, sports channel CSPN, and regional satellite stations in Ningxia, Xinjiang, Shenzhen, Jiangsu, Shandong, Zhejiang, and Tianjin. He has also worked for LeTV.com.

Since 2013, Huang has been a host on the show Only You (非你莫属) on Tianjin Television, a game show-style program designed for people seeking employment.

== Biography ==
Huang Jianxiang was born in 1968 in Wuhai, Inner Mongolia. He grew up in a family of football fans. His grandfather and his father were two early football fans in China. He became a football enthusiast in his school years. His family relocated to Nanjing in 1977. He attended the High School Affiliated to Nanjing Normal University, in Nanjing. In 1990, he graduated from the China Foreign Affairs University, receiving a bachelor's degree in foreign languages. He joined China Central Television (CCTV) in 1994 as a sports commentator.

Huang first appeared on CCTV-5, the national sports channel, with veteran commentator Li Weimiao, during the commentating for the 1995 Copa América. In 1996, Huang commentated on the 1996 Summer Olympics, the 1996 European Football Championship and the Asian Cup 1996. In 1997 Huang commentated on the 8th National Games of the People's Republic of China. In 1998, Huang commentated on the FIFA World Cup in France, the Asian Games in Bangkok, Thailand, and the African Cup of Nations held in West Africa.

By the late 1990s, Huang had established himself as one of the most prominent sports announcers on Chinese television. In 1999, Huang commentated on the FIFA Women's World Cup 1999 in the United States. In 2000, he commentated on the 2000 Summer Olympics in Sydney, Australia. In 2002, he commentated on the 2002 FIFA World Cup held in South Korea and Japan. In 2004, commentated on the 2004 Summer Olympics in Greece. In 2006, Huang commentated on the 2006 FIFA World Cup Germany.

== The World Cup Commentary 2006 Incident ==
=== The incident ===
On June 26, 2006 (UTC+8 June 27 03:00), during the FIFA World Cup match between Italy and Australia, as the on-field commentator of CCTV, Huang Jianxiang unexpectedly revealed his pro-Italian bias in an anti-Australian rant while commentating on the last minutes of a live match broadcast to many millions in China. This commentary has been compared to Bjørge Lillelien's "Your boys took one hell of a beating". He shouted himself hoarse in the process, and celebrated the Socceroos' exit from the Cup:

... "Penalty! Penalty! Penalty! Grosso's done it! Grosso's done it! Don't give the Australians any chance."

... "The great Italian left back! He succeeded in the glorious traditions of Italy! Facchetti, Cabrini and Maldini, their souls are infused in him at this moment! Grosso represents the long history and traditions of Italian soccer; he's not fighting alone at this moment! He's not alone!!"

... "Totti, Totti is facing the spot kick. He is facing the expectations from Italian soccer fans all over the world."

... "Schwarzer has saved two spot kicks in the World Cup qualifying tournaments, both of these were during the playoffs of the world cup qualification. Totti should have known this. Will he still be able to face the man in front of him with a smile? How about his expression after 10 seconds?"

... "Goooooal! Game over! Italy win! Beat the Socceroos! They do not fall in front of Hiddink again! Italy the great! Italian left back the great! Long live Italy! Happy birthday to Maldini!! Forza Italia!!"

... "He didn't let the Italians down. This penalty kick was an absolute one-off! Absolute one-off! Italy have made the final eight!"

... "The victory belongs to Italy, to Grosso, to Cannavaro, to Zambrotta, to Buffon, to Maldini, to everyone who loves Italian soccer!!"

... "The hell with them!" (Background voice)

... "The Socceroos might regret, Hiddink! He played too conservatively and too calmly with one more player (than Italy) in the second half, he lost all his courage. Faced with the long history and traditions of Italian soccer, he didn't attack as fiercely as he did in the group matches. He finally reaped fruits which he had sown! They should go home. They don't need to go as far away as Australia as most of them are living in Europe. Farewell!"

Huang was initially unapologetic for his controversial commentary in the post-game linkup with CCTV. He stated that he could not be impartial all the time and he did dislike the Socceroos because the team reminded him of the New Zealand team which defeated and eliminated the Chinese national team under controversial circumstances in the 1981 World Cup qualifying tournament.

Huang's commentary sparked a barrage of complaints as well as several press criticisms the following day. His commentary was replaced with another commentator's when the video of the match was replayed by CCTV. After reviewing his commentary, Huang eventually apologised on the state-run CCTV the next day, and posted an apology on its website for his unwarranted prejudice. He did not commentate on the next game.

Huang appeared live on CCTV again while he acted as commentator to the Germany vs. Argentina match on 30 June 2006, which quashed the rumour that he had been dismissed by CCTV. He commentated on many subsequent matches, including the final between France and Italy held in Berlin on 9 July 2006. In all these matches, Huang was paired with a fellow commentator.

=== Post-match reactions ===
Huang's outburst caused an uproar and then sparked a huge debate online and offline in China, as well as in Australia. His superior Zhang Bin, the director of CCTV Sports Channel, criticised Huang for first losing his voice (失声), next losing his cool (失态) then losing his politeness (失礼), and finally losing his mind (失常). Others criticised Huang for ceasing to be a neutral commentator at an official media and opined he should resign immediately.

On the other hand, people supporting Huang public voiced their opinions on several online forums to prevent his dismissal. A number of on-line parodies of Huang's match commentary became available on the Chinese websites such as on NetEase and Sina.

On November 16, 2006, Huang Jianxiang announced his resignation from CCTV, citing he needed a break from his busy schedule. CCTV sports director Jiang Heping told the Chinese media that Huang's resignation was a personal decision and had nothing to do with his controversial commentatary during the World Cup.

== Career after CCTV ==
Huang joined the Hong Kong–based Phoenix TV network in early December 2006, citing that they had offered the most lucrative deal to him over Hunan Television and Chongqing Television. Director Zhang Guoli had reputedly asked him to become an actor. In 2006 Huang also published his autobiography Not Fighting Alone (不是一个人在战斗). In 2007 Huang provided cameo roles in the films Call for Love and Kung Fu Dunk. At Phoenix, Huang hosted his own show "The Games Everyday" (天天運動會), in the 5:30 p.m. timeslot.

On November 6, 2007, Huang appeared as a special guest on Guangdong Television's "Tiansheng European Football Network" (天盛欧洲足球频道) to provide commentary for a match between Inter Milan and Juventus. This was his first football commentary-related appearance since the 2006 World Cup incident. Huang left Phoenix Television on January 1, 2008, due largely to poor ratings of the show he hosted. Huang joined sports syndication network CSPN in October 2008. On the network Huang served both on his traditional role as a commentator as well as in a managerial capacity, determining the strategic vision of the network. The network syndicated sports broadcasting to various regional satellite networks in China. Huang reportedly was involved in a contract dispute with CSPN, and left the network at the end of 2009.

In June 2009 Huang became a founding member of the electronic magazine Zui Tiyu ("Extreme Sports") on Sina.com. At Sina, he also hosted a talk show about the 2010 FIFA World Cup in South Africa. He appeared in the film Killing Paul the Octopus as part of the festivities surrounding the 2010 FIFA World Cup. In August 2010 he became the host of the show The Stock Market Goes up Every Day (股市天天向上) on Ningxia Television and First Financial TV Network (CBN). In February 2011 Huang acted as the voice of the character "Brutus" on the joint Chinese-German production Little Big Panda (熊猫总动员). In March 2011 Huang began hosting an intellectual-style talk show called "Tianshan Theory and Practice" (天山论见) on Xinjiang Television. In July 2011 Huang became the host of the CBN show "Exemplary Chinese professionals" (中国职场好榜样). In August, Huang went to Jiangsu Television to host the show Huayang Nianhua (花样年华). In the same month Huang became a spokesperson for eMoney.cn, an online trading portal. In October, Huang went to Shandong Television to host the show The Legend of Songs (歌声传奇).

In April 2013, Huang began hosting the show Zhongguo Xing Tiaoyue (中国星跳跃). On July 28, 2013, Huang began hosting the Tianjin Television show Only You (非你莫属). In August, Huang joined LeTV.com to host a show called Huang Duanzi (黄·段子).

In 2014 Huang was the "chief strategist" behind a music video featuring prominent Chinese sports TV commentators called "Ole Ole 2014", in anticipation of the 2014 FIFA World Cup in Brazil.

== Books ==
Huang Jianxiang published his first book, Teases on Soccer (歪批足球), in 2000. This book reviews various typical soccer matches in China and other countries, including strategies, championship systems, cultures and other aspects involved in activities of soccer.

Huang's second book, To Struggle as a Man, I am that Commentator (像男人那样去战斗 — 我就是那个"说球的"), was published in April 2006. This autobiography tells story of his life as a sports commentator since 2000 and gives his candid viewpoints regarding Chinese soccer and world soccer, as well as several major international sports events he experienced.

Huang also published an autobiography called Not Fighting Alone (不是一个人在战斗), a title that recalls one of the phrases he used during the 2006 commentary episode.

== Personal life ==
Huang was married to Sun Ying from 1998 to 2006. Huang had a daughter with Sun named Jiabao. Huang and Sun divorced in 2006. Custody of their child was reportedly given to Sun. He was romantically linked by Chinese media to Super Girl contestant Jane Zhang. Huang was reported by Chinese media to have married again in 2012 and had another daughter and son.

On August 20, 2009, Huang posted his first weibo entry on Sina Weibo. As of June 2011, he is being followed by more than 5.6 million fans and have posted more than 12,000 weibo articles.

== See also ==
- Bjørge Lillelien, Norwegian football commentator with a similarly memorable match commentary
- Guðmundur Benediktsson, Icelandic football commentator, also with a similarly memorable match commentary
