= Mahmoud Ezzamel =

British academic

Mahmoud Ezzamel is a Professorial Fellow at Cardiff University. He is particularly notable for his research contributions to behavioural accounting, accounting in the public sector and accounting history.

== History ==
Mahmoud Ezzamel's academic background began at the University of Alexandria, in Egypt, where he completed his bachelor's degree as well as master's degree. He then completed a Ph.D. at the University of Southampton, where his thesis was entitled ‘A Study of the Theory and Practice of Divisional Accounting’.

Ezzamel has written several published articles and books relating to his research interests that range from accounting and accountability in the public sector to accounting history. His studies on accounting theory revolve mainly around accounting in ancient civilizations, especially in Egypt. His interest in hieroglyphs has led to his many papers on the accounting evidence found in Mesopotamia, ancient Mexico, India and Egypt. He is also member on the editorial boards of several known journals in accounting theory.

== Selected publications ==
- "The role of accounting in organizational transformation" (2008)
- "Accounting for teamwork: a critical study of group-based systems of organizational control" - Special Issue: Critical Perspectives on Organizational Control (1998)
- "The roles of accounting information systems in an organization experiencing financial crisis" (1990)
- "Regulating accounting in foreign invested firms in China from Mao to Deng" (2008)
