= Abedelnasser Abulrob =

British-born scientist and professor

- Born: Abedelnasser Abulrob; March 2, 1965; London, U.K.
- Education: University of Jordan (BS); University of Strathclyde (MSc); Cardiff University (PhD)
- Writing career
- Pen name: AbedelNasser Abulrob

Abedelnasser Abulrob is a British-born medical researcher specialising in the areas of cancer therapeutics and personalized medicine. He held several senior level positions at the National Research Council of Canada, and is currently an adjunct Professor at the Faculty of Medicine-University of Ottawa in Canada.

== Early life ==
He earned his degree in Pharmaceutical Sciences from the University of Jordan in 1994, a masters in Clinical Pharmacy from University of Strathclyde in Scotland in 1997 and a PhD in Pharmaceutical Cell Biology and Biotechnology at Cardiff University in the UK in 2000

== Career ==
Abulrob joined the National Research Council in 2000. He was promoted to be Project Leader and Senior Research Officer in 2006. In 2007, he joined the Department of Cellular & Molecular Medicine, Faculty of Medicine, University of Ottawa as an adjunct Professor. According to his website at the University of Ottawa Brain and Mind Institute, he is interested in Molecular Imaging & Personalized Medicine, Biomarker Discovery in Cancer and Brain diseases, Nano-Biotechnology, Therapeutic Drug Delivery & Targeting to the Brain and Drug Pharmacokinetics & Pharmacodynamics"

== Publications ==
His most cited journal articles are:

- Semov A, Moreno MJ, Onichtchenko A, Abulrob A, Ball M, Ekiel I, Pietrzynski G, Stanimirovic D, Alakhov V. Metastasis-associated protein S100A4 induces angiogenesis through interaction with Annexin II and accelerated plasmin formation. Journal of Biological Chemistry. 2005 May 27;280(21):20833-41. (Cited 210 times, according to Google Scholar)
- Abulrob A, Sprong H, En Henegouwen PV, Stanimirovic D. The blood–brain barrier transmigrating single domain antibody: mechanisms of transport and antigenic epitopes in human brain endothelial cells. Journal of neurochemistry. 2005 Nov;95(4):1201-14. (Cited 215 times, according to Google Scholar.)
- Abulrob A, Giuseppin S, Andrade MF, McDermid A, Moreno M, Stanimirovic D. Interactions of EGFR and caveolin-1 in human glioblastoma cells: evidence that tyrosine phosphorylation regulates EGFR association with caveolae. Oncogene. 2004 Sep;23(41):6967-79. (Cited 143 times, according to Google Scholar.)
- Abulrob A, Lu Z, Baumann E, Vobornik D, Taylor R, Stanimirovic D, Johnston LJ. Nanoscale imaging of epidermal growth factor receptor clustering: effects of inhibitors. Journal of Biological Chemistry. 2010 Jan 29;285(5):3145-56.(Cited 110 times, according to Google Scholar.)

== Awards ==
He received the Industrial Partnership award in 2006, National Research Council Group Achievement award in 2008, National Research Council Entrepreneurship and Innovation Award in 2010, Canada Arab Ambassadors award(science category)in 2013 and NRC Research and Technology Breakthrough Award in 2017.
