= Jiang Heping =

Chinese television executive

- 江和平
- Born: January 7, 1963 (age 63)
- Education: Shanghai International Studies University; Cardiff University
- Occupation: Television executive
- Employer: China Central Television
- Title: Director, CCTV Sports Centre
- Political party: Chinese Communist Party

Senior Editor Jiang Heping (Chinese: 江和平; pinyin: Jiāng Hépíng) is a prominent executive at China Central Television (CCTV), the state broadcaster of the People's Republic of China. He is responsible for sport coverage in his roles as Executive Director of the CCTV Sports Programming Centre and Controller of CCTV-5, its national sports channel, and played a key role in the broadcasting of the 2008 Summer Olympics in Beijing.

== Career ==
Senior Editor Jiang was born on January 7, 1963, in Tongchen, Anhui province. Jiang studied English language and international journalism at Shanghai International Studies University. He graduated in July 1987. Jiang is a member of the Chinese Communist Party. He was assigned to work at CCTV's International News Division, rising to become deputy editor and editor from 1990 to 1996. He introduced new programming, including the division's first live news bulletins. In February 1996 he was appointed deputy director of the News Department, and was permitted to take an MA in Journalism at the University of Wales, Cardiff from September 1996 to September 1997, funded by the British government. He moved to become deputy director of the Foreign Language News Department in 1998, and was promoted to director in May 2000. In this role, he oversaw the launch of CCTV-9. In April 2003, he became deputy head of CCTV's Overseas Service and Controller of CCTV-9. He oversaw a relaunch of this channel, the launch of a new French/Spanish channel (CCTV-E&F) and increased availability of CCTV services in North America (Great Wall TV).

In May 2005, he became deputy director and acting director of the CCTV Sports Programming Centre. Six months later his appointment as director was confirmed, and in July 2006 he took over direct responsibility for CCTV-5. During the 2006 football World Cup, he was involved in the Huang Jianxiang controversy. Since then, he has been reshaping the channel in preparation for the 2008 Summer Olympics.

== Publications ==
- Jiang Heping (2005). "Window on China and the World: CCTV-9". In Sucharita S. Eashwar (ed.). Asia Media Summit 2005: Promoting Peace and Prosperity in a Globalised World (PDF). Asia-Pacific Institute for Broadcasting Development. ISBN 983-41053-3-9. Archived from the original (PDF) on 2007-11-29.

== Sources ==
- Matthew Forney (31 May 2004). "Raising the Bar in Beijing". Time. Archived from the original on December 11, 2008.. The article describes CCTV-9 under Jiang's leadership.
