= Specsavers =

British retail brand

Specsavers Optical Group Limited
- Formerly: Visionplus Care Ltd.; M.L. Bebbington Ltd.
- Type: Private
- Industry: Optometrists and dispensing opticians
- Founded: 10 November 1983; 42 years ago
- Founders: Mary Perkins; Doug Perkins
- Headquarters: Saint Andrew, Guernsey
- Key people: Doug Perkins (Chairman); John Perkins (CEO)
- Products: Prescription glasses, sunglasses, contact lenses, eye tests
- Revenue: £3.55 billion (FYE 28 February 2023)
- Owner: The Perkins family
- Number of employees: 32,500+
- Parent: Specsavers International Healthcare
- Website: Official website

Specsavers Optical Group Limited is a Guernsey-based multinational optical and audiology retail chain, which operates mainly in the UK, Ireland, Australia, New Zealand, Canada, the Netherlands and the Nordic countries. The chain offers optometry, optician and audiology services, and sells glasses, sunglasses, contact lenses and hearing aids. In the United Kingdom in 2012, it had the largest single market share of the four major opticians, with 42% of the market. The company had a total turnover of £4.18 billion in 2024/2025 across 2,815 businesses. The firm operates most of its stores as a business partnership jointly owned by an Optometry Director and a Retail Director.

== History ==
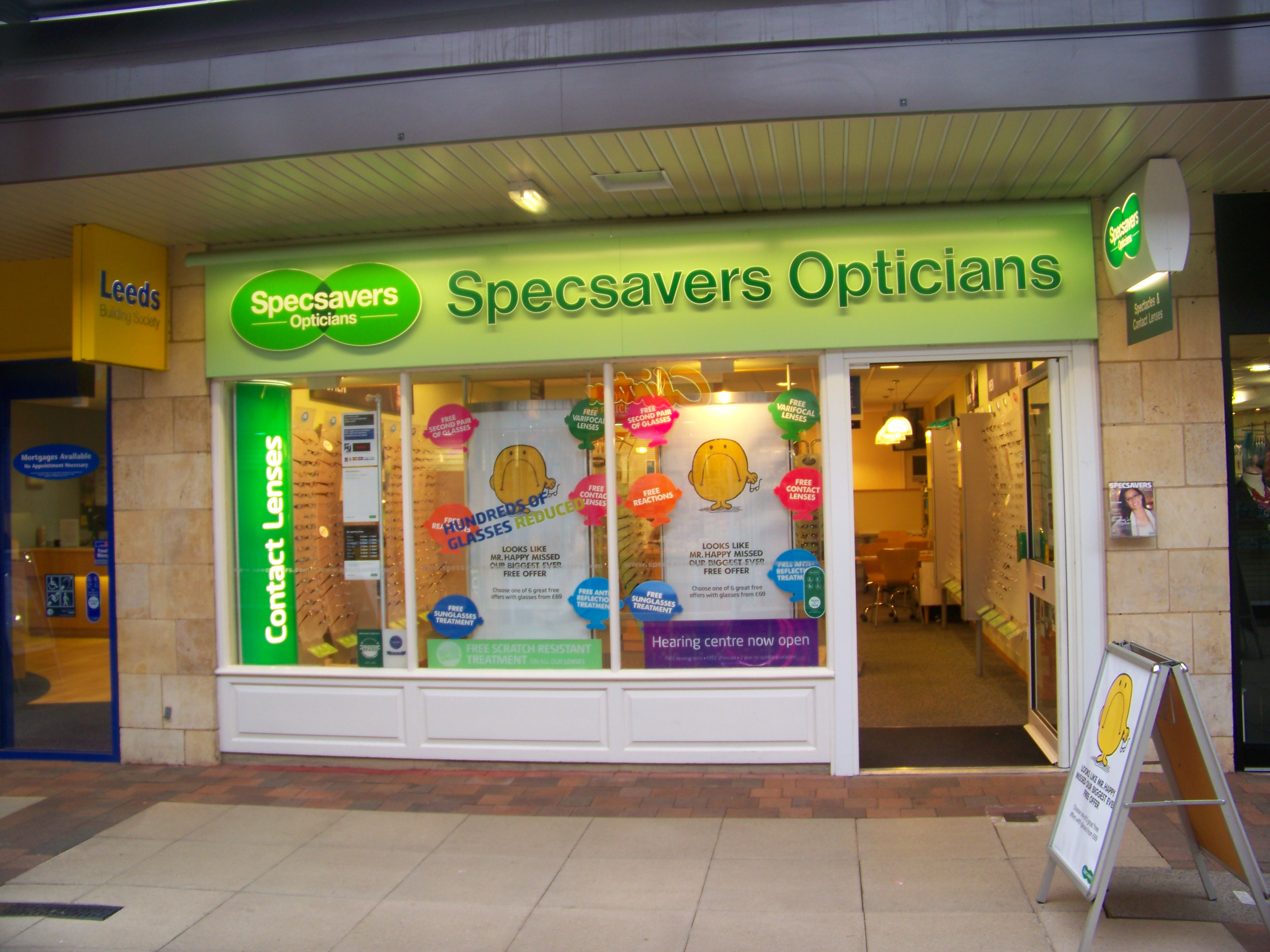
A branch of Specsavers (with older signage) in the Horsefair Centre in Wetherby, West Yorkshire.

The group was launched in 1984, by husband and wife team Doug Perkins and Mary Perkins, on the island of Guernsey.

In April 2004, Specsavers acquired the Blic Optik franchise from its Swedish owner Optimum Optik AB. In 2007, finance director John Perkins became joint managing director, with his father Doug Perkins.

The company took advantage of the development of the Any Qualified Provider initiative in the English National Health Service from 2009 onwards to expand into the hearing aid business.

In February 2016, it was announced that Specsavers would be the sponsors of the County Championship cricket competition in England and Wales, for the next four years; a deal which was extended in 2018 to include Test series held in England including the 2019 Ashes series.

In May 2020, Specsavers set up a video consultation service for the first time, to check people's eyes and hearing aids during the COVID-19 pandemic.

In May 2021, it was announced that in March 2021 Specsavers had entered the North American market with its purchase of 18 practices from Canada-based Image Optometry.

In 2024 Specsavers celebrated the 40th anniversary of its founding, and had at the time 2500 stores in 11 countries.

Specsavers withdrew from the Spanish market in 2025.

== Structure ==
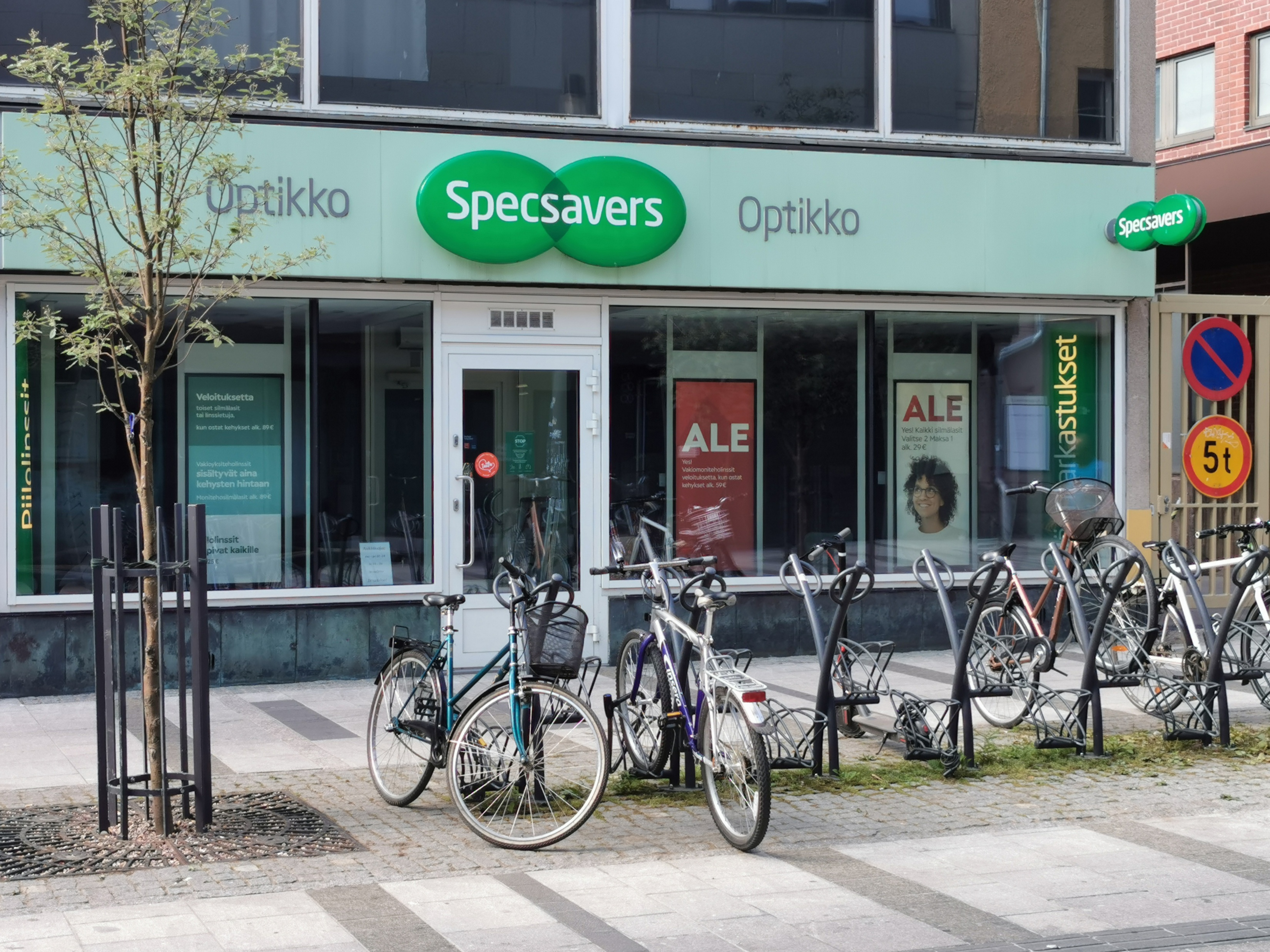
Specsavers store along the Kauppurienkatu street in Oulu, Finland

The firm operates most of its stores as a "Joint or Shared Venture Partnership", consisting of a partnership between an Optometry Director and a Retail Director.

This is similar to a franchise agreement; however, unlike many franchises, a customer from one branch of the company should expect to get equal service from another branch. It also differs in that Specsavers own shares in the franchisee business rather than just providing goods and services under a franchise agreement. In other territories such as Sweden, Norway and Spain, they operate a normal franchise agreement.

== Market position ==
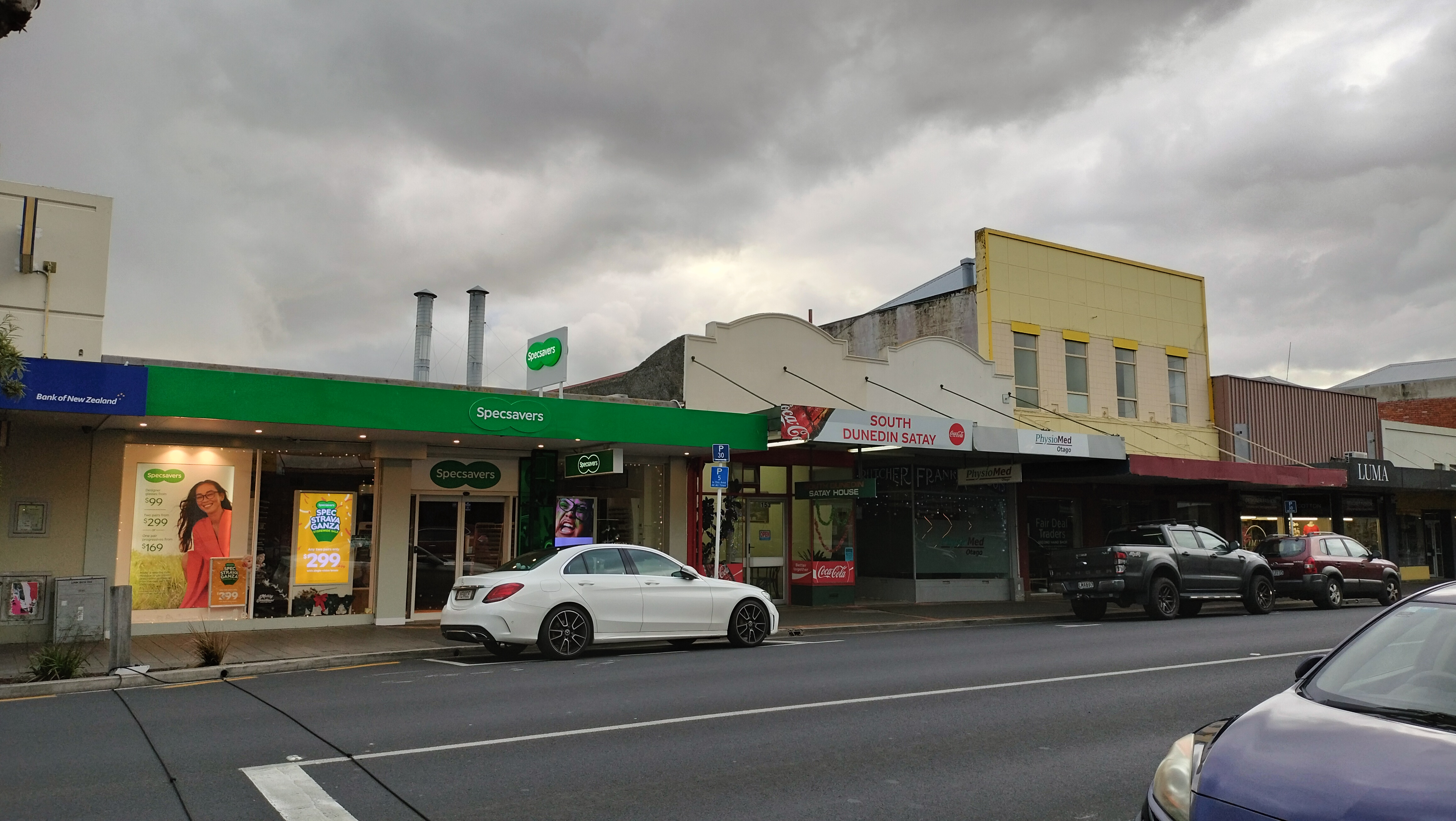
Specsavers store in South Dunedin, New Zealand

As well as stores in the United Kingdom and the Crown Dependencies, Specsavers are present in Ireland, the Netherlands, Denmark, Finland, Norway, Sweden, Australia, New Zealand and Canada. The company ventured into hearing services in 2002. Their Hearing Centres division provides hearing tests and hearing aids within Specsavers' optical stores, providing services from 650 locations.

As well as their own frame designs, Specsavers sell collections by brands including Jeff Banks, Hackett London and Quiksilver for men, Converse and Tommy Hilfiger for men and women, and Roxy, Karen Millen and Kylie Minogue for women.

== Advertising campaigns ==
Example of a Specsavers social media advert, featuring a variant of the strapline

In February 2007, Specsavers was ranked No. 46 of the United Kingdom's 100 Heaviest Spenders on TV Advertising, spending £27 million. Specsavers' long running advertising campaign is based on the popular strapline "Should've gone to Specsavers". A common theme of these adverts is a character making a mistake because of poor eyesight. These include a sheep farmer who shears his sheepdog, and an elderly couple who ride the Infusion rollercoaster after mistaking the seats of the ride for a bench.

Specsavers' use of Édith Piaf in advertisements has caused some adverse comment in the press, although the estate of the performer had granted full permission. Other Specsavers adverts have featured Thunderbirds, Postman Pat, Mr. Men and John Cleese as Basil Fawlty.

In 2017, Specsavers officially launched a range of eyewear designed by the popstar, singer and actress Kylie Minogue.

In 2022, Specsavers offered mentoring and equipment to a poorly performing amateur football team, and produced a documentary series about its progress. This has been repeated subsequently, with a different team chosen each year.

== Criticism of internet retailers ==
In March 2005, Specsavers publicly criticised Glasses Direct, an internet retailer, claiming that an internet service "did not meet required standards" and "could not offer advice from dispensing opticians". In 2006, James Murray Wells, the managing director of Glasses Direct, claimed that four major high street retailers including Specsavers were "leading a campaign to stop prescription glasses being sold over the internet".

== JobKeeper controversies ==
On 15 September 2021, it was revealed in a 7.30 exposé that Specsavers had taken advantage of the Australian government's JobKeeper scheme. JobKeeper was designed to subsidise wages for Australian workers during the COVID-19 emergency from April 2020 to March 2021. The intended recipients of JobKeeper were companies struggling financially throughout the pandemic. Specsavers applied for the subsidy, receiving over A$90 million during these six months. Despite having a strong year across the optometry vertical, including reported profits for Specsavers, this subsidy resulted in an increase of revenue by more than 100% year on year.

Outcry resulted from this report due not only to Specsavers not requiring the full subsidy, but also that the profits which were sourced from tax contributions in Australia were immediately directed offshore to Specsavers headquarters in the known tax haven of Guernsey.

Specsavers received additional criticism for repaying only A$4 million in JobKeeper payments, when other companies like Cochlear, CIMIC and Mirvac had already repaid larger amounts.

== Business strategy and future ==
The Perkins have stated that they intend to maintain family control of the firm, which currently employs two of their three children in senior roles. Continued expansion into Europe is planned. It is also intended that the company will continue to supply hearing aids.

The Perkins attribute their success to their franchise model, and to the deregulation of the UK Opticians market by the Conservative Prime Minister Margaret Thatcher in the 1980s, allowing opticians to use previously forbidden advertising and marketing techniques to rapidly take over a market that had belonged to independent local opticians.

The Perkins have said of the remaining local opticians that "their days are numbered", and in fact their major competition now comes from large chains such as Boots Opticians and Vision Express.

In January 2017, Specsavers were in negotiation to have shops undertake certain front line medical care linked to sight and hearing, in both the United Kingdom and the Netherlands.

In May 2020, Specsavers announced a plan to cut 450 jobs amid a "dramatic downturn" caused by the COVID-19 pandemic. The company had previously tried to avoid making redundancies by implementing pay cuts and reducing working hours.
