= Mary Perkins =

English businesswoman (born 1944)

Dame Mary Perkins DBE
- Born: 14 February 1944 (age 82); Bristol, England
- Education: Fairfield Grammar School, Cardiff University
- Occupation: Businesswoman
- Known for: Founder of Specsavers
- Spouse: Doug Perkins
- Children: 3

Dame Mary Lesley Perkins, DBE (born 14 February 1944) is an English billionaire who is the co-founder of Specsavers, the British retail optometry and audiology chain. In 2013 she became Britain's first female self-made billionaire.

Together with her husband, co-founder and chairman Doug Perkins, Dame Mary has three children, all of whom work for Specsavers. Their son, John, has been chief executive of Specsavers since 2015.

In The Sunday Times Rich List 2026, Mary and Doug Perkins and family were ranked 117th in the list of Britain's Wealthiest People, with their personal worth estimated at £1.409 billion. In The Sunday Times Tax List 2026, they were ranked tenth, having paid £121.7 million in tax.

== Early life ==
She attended Fairfield Grammar School in Bristol. She then went to Cardiff University to train as an optometrist. At Cardiff, she met Doug Perkins, whom she later married. The couple established their first business in Bristol in the 1960s. This became a chain of optometrists around Bristol, which they sold for £2 million in 1980. After the sale the couple moved to Guernsey, where Mary's father had retired.

== Specsavers ==
Mary and Doug Perkins established Specsavers in Guernsey in 1984. In 2007 it was the largest privately owned opticians in the world, with nearly 900 stores across the UK and Europe. By 2011 the company had an annual turnover of £1.5bn and over 30,000 staff in markets in the UK, Europe and Australasia. Mary sits on the company board, oversees business development and has particular responsibility for running PR. She has admitted donning disguises and visiting Specsavers stores, posing as a customer.

In 2023, Mary and Doug Perkins placed Specsavers into a family trust, stating that they did not want their children to sell the business to private equity.

== Awards and honours ==
Perkins was made an honorary fellow of Cardiff University in 2005. The same year she received the Rotary International Community and Vocational Service Award for her services to charity and in 2006 won the inaugural Spirit of everywoman Award. Perkins was the first female optometrist in the UK to receive the title of Dame Commander of the Order of the British Empire (DBE) in 2007 for services to Business and to the community in Guernsey.

The accolade was also in recognition of her other charitable work, including the Guernsey annual "Specsavers Liberation Tea Dance for pensioners", and her directorship of Women's Refuge and Age Concern. She is also a patron to leading children's charity Kidscape.

Mary also supports culture as the Honorary Patron of Masteg Gleemen, a Welsh Male Voice Choir.

In 2012 Perkins was awarded an Honorary Doctorate of Business from Plymouth University

In February 2013 she was assessed as one of the 100 most powerful women in the United Kingdom by Woman's Hour on BBC Radio 4.

In July 2015 she was made an Officer Sister of the Most Venerable Order of the Hospital of Saint John of Jerusalem.

In October 2017, Mary was honoured with an EY Entrepreneur Of The Year UK Lifetime Achievement Award for her continued contribution to entrepreneurship and the economy.

In 2018, Mary was awarded an honorary Doctor of Laws by the University of Bristol and an honorary Doctor of Science by De Montfort University in Leicester.

In 2023, Mary was inducted into the Great British Entrepreneur Awards Hall of Fame in recognition of her continued support for new business leaders.

== Other ==
Perkins is a founding patron of the not-for-profit social enterprise Modern Muse.
