= Stephen Dunnett =

British neuroscientist

- Born: 28 January 1950 (age 76); London, England
- Citizenship: UK
- Education: University of Cambridge, Birkbeck College, London
- Known for: Cell therapies for neurodegenerative diseases
- Scientific career
- Fields: Neuroscientist
- Workplaces: University of Cambridge, Cardiff University

Stephen "Steve" Dunnett DSc FMedSci FLSW (born 28 January 1950) is a British neuroscientist, and among the most highly cited researchers in the neurosciences. Until his retirement in 2017, he was a professor at Cardiff University and the founder and co-director of the Brain Repair Group, where he worked on developing cell therapies for neurodegenerative diseases including Parkinson's disease and Huntington's disease.

== Early life and education ==
Dunnett was born in London, where he attended Eltham College, an independent school, then won an open exhibition to study Mathematics at Churchill College, Cambridge. After graduating in 1972, he worked for several years as social worker in the London Borough of Southwark.

He returned to university to study for a second bachelor's degree in psychology at Birkbeck College, London, from where he graduated in 1978 with the prize for the top first class degree in the Faculty of Sciences. Dunnett then returned to Cambridge University in 1978 as a research student at Clare College and was awarded a PhD in experimental psychology in 1981.

== Academic career ==
After a brief spell as a visiting research scientist at Lund University in 1981-2, Dunnett returned to Cambridge, he was a lecturer and reader in the Department of Experimental Psychology, Fellow of Clare College from 1984 onwards, and from 1992 to 1999 he was Director of Scientific Programmes at the Medical Research Council Centre for Brain Repair. He moved to Cardiff University in 2000, where he is a full professor in the neuroscience division of the School of Biosciences. He directs the Brain Repair Group, focussing on development of novel cell based therapies for neurodegenerative disease. For many years, Dunnett was editor in chief of Brain Research Bulletin.

He retired to France in 2017 but retains an emeritus appointment with Cardiff University.

== Awards and honours ==
In 1988, the British Psychological Society awarded Dunnett the Spearman Medal for outstanding published work by an early-career researcher. He became a Fellow of the Royal Society of Medicine the next year, of the Academy of Medical Sciences in 2003, and of the Learned Society of Wales in 2011.

He was the Knight Visiting Professor at the University of Miami School of Medicine in 1992. Dunnett has also been awarded the Alfred Mayer medal of the British Neuropathological Society (1998) and Honorary Fellowship of the International Behavioral Neuroscience Society (2002).[2]

== Books ==
Books that Dunnett has co-authored or co-edited include:

- Dunnett, S.B.; Richards, S.J., eds. (1990). Neural Transplantation: From Molecular Basis to Clinical Applications. Progress in Brain Research. Vol. 82. Amsterdam: Elsevier. p. 743. ISBN 978-0-444-81137-0.
- Dunnett, S.B.; Björklund, A., eds. (1992). Neural Transplantation. A Practical Approach. Oxford: IRL Press. p. 211. ISBN 978-0-19-963286-2.
- Dunnett, S.B.; Björklund, A., eds. (1994). Functional Neural Transplantation. New York: Raven Press. p. 587. ISBN 978-0-7817-0068-9.
- Barker, R.A.; Dunnett, S. B. (1999). Neural repair, transplantation and rehabilitation. Hove, UK: The Psychology Press. pp. 339. ISBN 978-0-86377-628-1.
- Dunnett, S. B.; Boulton, A. A.; Baker, Glen B., eds. (2000). Neural transplantation methods. Totowa, NJ: Humana Press. p. 556. ISBN 978-0-89603-793-9.
- Dunnett, S.B.; Björklund, A., eds. (2000). Functional neural transplantation II: novel cell therapies for CNS disorders. Amsterdam: Elsevier. p. 559. ISBN 978-0-444-50109-7.
- Fawcett, James W.; Rosser, Anne E.; Dunnett, S. B.; Baker, Harry F. (2001). Brain damage, brain repair. New York: Oxford University Press. pp. 466. ISBN 978-0-19-852338-3.
- Dunnett, S.B.; Bentivoglio, M.; Björklund, A.; Hökfelt, T., eds. (2005). Dopamine. Handbook of Chemical Neuroanatomy. Vol. 21. Amsterdam: Elsevier. p. 588. ISBN 978-0-444-51778-4.
- Iversen, L.L.; Iversen, S.D.; Dunnett, S.B.; Björklund, A., eds. (2010). Dopamine Handbook. Oxford: Oxford University Press. p. 615. ISBN 978-0-19-537303-5.
- Lane, E.L.; Dunnett, S.B., eds. (2011). Animal Models of Movement Disorders: Volume I. Neuromethods. Vol. 61. Heidelberg & New York: Springer Science. p. 450. ISBN 978-1-61779-298-4.
- Lane, E.L.; Dunnett, S.B., eds. (2011). Animal Models of Movement Disorders: Volume II. Neuromethods. Vol. 62. Heidelberg & New York: Springer Science. p. 443. ISBN 978-1-61779-300-4.
- Dunnett, S.B.; Björklund, A., eds. (2012). Functional Neural Transplantation III: Primary and Stem Cell Therapies for Brain Repair, part 1. Progress in Brain Research. Vol. 200. Amsterdam: Elsevier. p. 430. ISBN 978-0-444-59575-1.
- Dunnett, S.B.; Björklund, A., eds. (2012). Functional Neural Transplantation III: Primary and Stem Cell Therapies for Brain Repair, part 2. Progress in Brain Research. Vol. 201. Amsterdam: Elsevier. p. 377. ISBN 978-0-444-59544-7.
- Dunnett, S.B.; Björklund, A., eds. (2017). Functional Neural Transplantation IV: Translation to Clinical Application, part 1. Progress in Brain Research. Vol. 230. Amsterdam: Elsevier. p. 381. ISBN 978-0-128-11738-5.
- Dunnett, S.B.; Björklund, A., eds. (2017). Functional Neural Transplantation IV: Translation to Clinical Application, part 2. Progress in Brain Research. Vol. 231. Amsterdam: Elsevier. p. 325. ISBN 978-0-128-13879-3.
- Precious, S.V.; Rosser, A.E.; Dunnett, S.B., eds. (2018). Huntington's Disease. Methods in Molecular Biology. Vol. 1780. New York: Springer. p. 639. ISBN 978-1-4939-7825-0.
