= Alan Trevor Jones =

Welsh health service administrator (1901–1979)

- Born: 24 February 1901; Pengam, Wales
- Died: 10 June 1979
- Occupation: Official
- Education: University College, Cardiff
- Medical career
- Profession: health service administrator provost
- Institutions: University College Hospital; St. Marylebone Hospital; Swansea General Hospital; Carmarthen Borough Council; Carmarthen Rural District; Carmarthen Infirmary; Welsh Board of Health; Welsh National School of Medicine

Alan Trevor Jones (24 February 1901 – 10 June 1979) was a Welsh health service administrator and provost of the Welsh National School of Medicine.

== Early life ==
He was born on 24 February 1901 in Pengam in Glamorgan, the youngest son of Roger Williams Jones, M.A., J.P., who was from Monmouthshire and a headmaster at Lewis School, Pengam.

== Education ==
He attended Lewis School, Pengam, where his father was headmaster, then completed his pre-clinical training at University College, Cardiff, and received his clinical training at the University College Hospital.

He earned an M.B.B.S. at London and became a Licentiate of the Royal College of Physicians in 1924. He obtained an M.D. at London and became a Member of the Royal College of Physicians in 1927. He earned a Diploma in Public Health in 1929, became a Fellow of the Royal College of Physicians in 1953 and received an Honorary LLD from the University of Wales in 1970.

== Career ==
After qualifying in London in the mid-1920s, he worked as the house physician, obstetric assistant, and casualty medical officer at University College Hospital.

Between 1927 and 1929, he worked at St. Marylebone Hospital, receiving a promotion in 1929 from third to second assistant medical officer, and became deputy medical superintendent.

He returned to Wales in 1929, working as superintendent to the medical staff at Swansea General Hospital, earning a salary of £250, rising by £50 annually. After about a year, he moved to Carmarthen, working in a general practice headed by his aunt, as well as medical officer of health and schools, and medical officer for Carmarthen Borough Council and Carmarthen Rural District, a position which he was appointed to in December 1933. In 1931, he was appointed as a doctor at Carmarthen Infirmary, arguing in 1934 that a maternity block was required at the hospital.

=== Medical officer of the Welsh Board of Health ===
In 1935, aged 34, he was appointed as medical officer of the Welsh Board of Health after being invited to apply for the position. Prior to this appointment, he was in practice in Carmarthen. For his first two years in the role, he evaluated projects to alleviate unemployment and improve health facilities in the depressed areas of South Wales. In 1937, he investigated the causes of maternal mortality in Wales for the Minister of Health.

In 1938, he became Hospital Officer for Wales, under the Emergency Medical Services scheme. His initial priority was reviewing Wales' healthcare facilities to ensure they could cope with health-related consequences of war. He remained in the role until the end of the "emergency" in 1947.

In 1943, he surveyed hospitals in South Wales and Monmouthshire to advise on post-war hospital policy, publishing Survey of Hospital Services in South Wales in 1945 alongside Professor J. A. Nixon of University of Bristol and Professor Ralph Picken of Welsh National School of Medicine. The survey emphasised the need for a large new medical teaching centre in Cardiff.

=== Senior administrative medical officer of the Welsh Regional Hospital Board ===
In 1947, aged 46, he was appointed as senior administrative medical officer to the newly constituted Welsh Regional Hospital Board in Cardiff at a salary of £2,250. There were 51 applications for the position. In this role, he played a key role in implementing the National Health Service Act in Wales.

In 1949, he reported the hospitals in Wales were short of specialists.

When you use your talents, set up for yourself your own ideals of living and conduct. Don't conform to the standards you will find accepted in the world outside. Many stand high in fame as measured by popular acclaim, but one wonders whether they have achieved a pass mark according to the standards and ideals they set up for themselves as boys. Boys have ideals in the simple virtues — honesty and integrity, courage and loyalty — the stuff of which men are made.

— Dr. Alan Trevor Jones, Excerpt from speech at the annual prize day of Lewis Grammar School for Boys, Pengam in 1952

In 1952, he opened an extension to the Llandovery Cottage Hospital. In 1953, he opened a pathological laboratory and orthopaedic and outpatients' department at St. Tydfil's Hospital.

He resigned from the position of senior administrative medical officer in March 1955, but remained a member of the Welsh Regional Hospital Board.

=== Provost of the Welsh National School of Medicine ===
In 1954, he applied for provost of the Welsh National School of Medicine in Cardiff. After several months of deliberation, he was appointed to the position in 1955.

A Provost with general experience of all sides of medicine was able to contribute something to a school, which the teachers, with their very narrow interests, could not bring.

— Alan Trevor Jones, His diary quoting his interview for Provost

In 1957, he also acted as Vice-Chancellor, conferring degrees on graduands of the school.

From the 1940s, he had been interested in building a medical teaching centre in Cardiff, with plans first revealed in 1951, which his priority as provost was to implement. It was the first hospital designed specifically as a teaching hospital and was built on a 53-acre site at Heath Park, combining the Welsh National School of Medicine and the University Hospital of Wales. The Dental School and Hospital was opened in 1966. The University Hospital of Wales and medical school buildings opened in 1971.

He retired from the provostship and from the General Medical Council in 1969 but continued serving as a member of the Board of Governors and Hospital Management Committee.

== Personal life and death ==
On 28 March 1931, he married Gwyneth Evans at the Welsh Presbyterian Church, Charing Cross Road. They took their honeymoon in Paris. The couple had a daughter, who qualified as a nurse; a son, Roger Verrier-Jones, who became a consultant paediatrician; and a grandson also in medicine.

He enjoyed reading, particularly Dickens and historical works, and he was a member of a literary club in Cardiff. He was a Presbyterian.

He died on 10 June 1979. He was buried in the Gelligaer churchyard.
