= Cardiff University School of Medicine =

Medical school in Cardiff, Wales

Coordinates: 51.508°N 3.18631°W

- Ysgol Feddygaeth Prifysgol Caerdydd
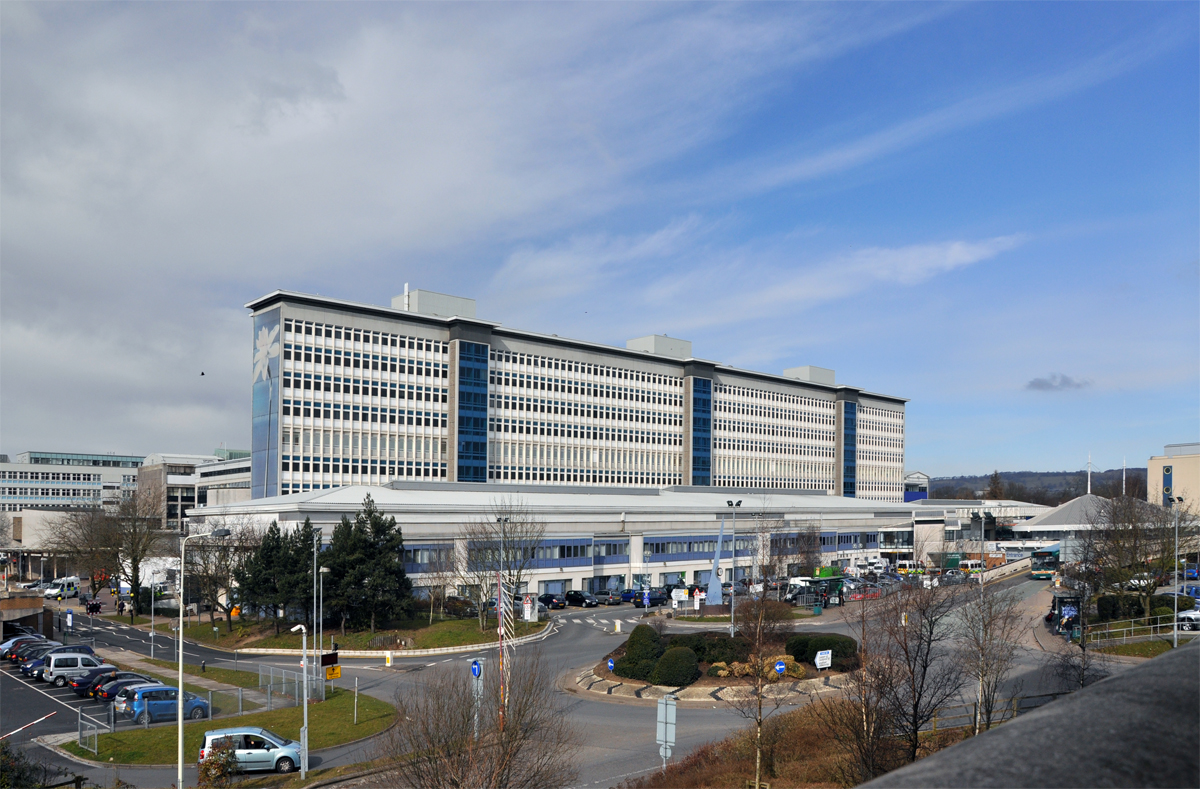
- Former names: Welsh National School of Medicine; University of Wales College of Medicine
- Type: Medical school
- Established: 1893; 133 years ago
- Affiliations: Cardiff University
- Dean: Acting Head Professor Rachel Errington
- Faculty: 638
- Undergraduates: 1000
- Postgraduates: 1100
- Location: Cardiff, Wales
- Website: medicine.cardiff.ac.uk

The Cardiff University School of Medicine (Welsh: Ysgol Feddygaeth Prifysgol Caerdydd) is the medical school of Cardiff University and is located in Cardiff, Wales, UK. Founded in 1893 as part of the University College of South Wales and Monmouthshire, it is the oldest of the three medical schools in Wales.

It is one of the largest medical schools in the United Kingdom, employing nearly 600 academic and 450 support staff; and with over 1000 undergraduate and 1100 postgraduate students enrolled on medical and scientific courses. The school has an annual financial turnover of over £50 million, of which nearly half comes from competitive external research funding. The school is based at the University Hospital of Wales in Cardiff. It offers undergraduate and postgraduate programs in teaching and research across the Centre for Medical Education and divisions such as Cancer and Genetics, Infection and Immunity, Population Medicine, and Psychological Medicine & Clinical Neurosciences.

== History ==
=== Origins ===
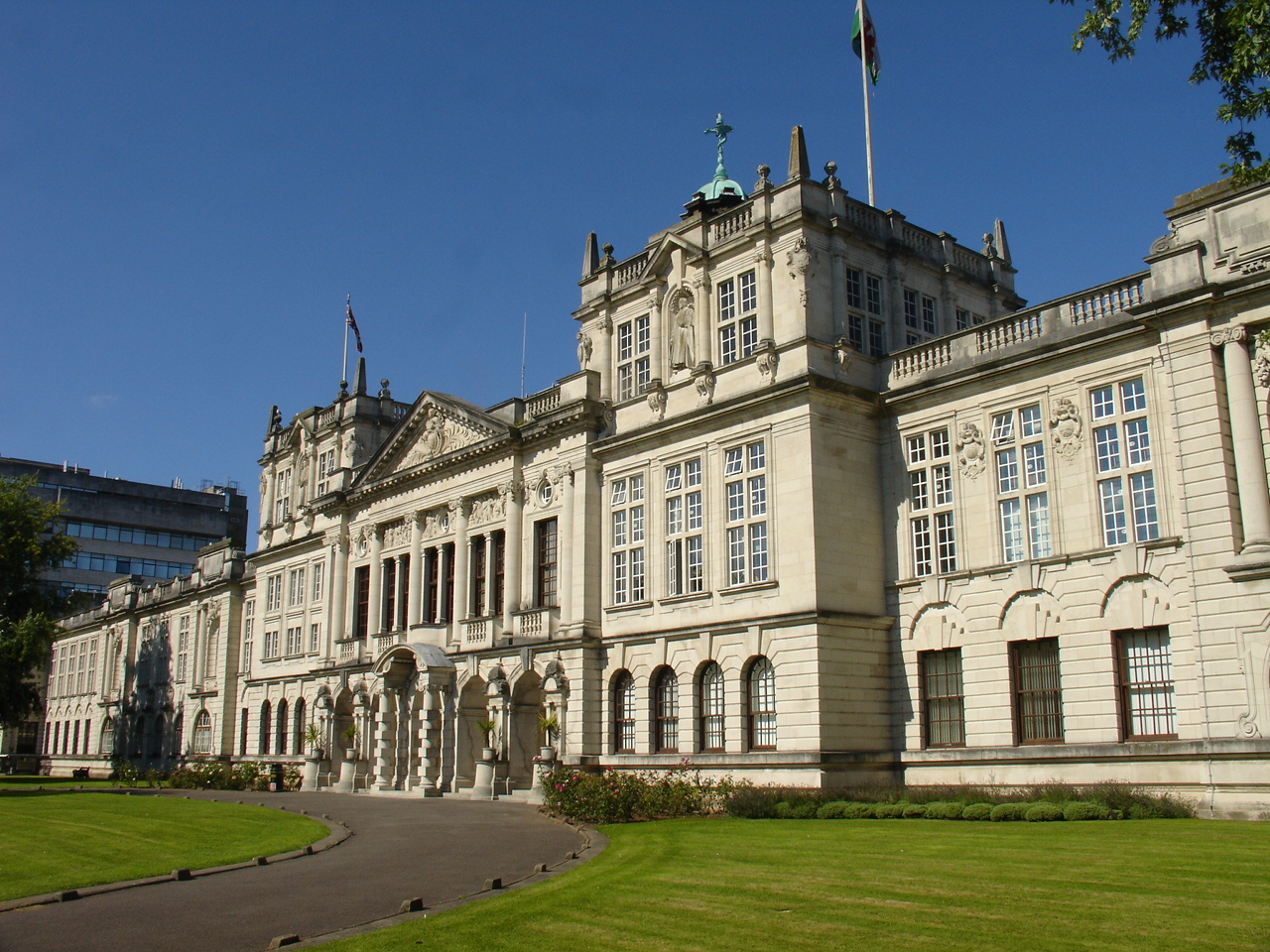
The Main Building of Cardiff University

The medical school was founded as Cardiff Medical School in 1893 when the Departments of Anatomy, Physiology and Pharmacology were established at University College of South Wales and Monmouthshire (now Cardiff University). Much of the initial funding came from the donations of Sir William James Thomas, 1st Baronet.

The opening ceremony took place on 14 February 1894 at the college buildings on Dumfries Place and was conducted by John Viriamu Jones, Principal of the college, and Richard Quain, President of the General Medical Council. During the ceremony professors of the new medical school encouraged it to emulate the recent advances in medical education at the University of Heidelberg. The first Dean of the school was Alfred W. Hughes of Corris.

A department of Pathology and Bacteriology was added in 1910. Students finishing their preclinical studies at Cardiff went on to other medical schools for their clinical studies, many going to University College Hospital in London, part of University College London.

=== Welsh National School of Medicine ===
In 1921 it became a clinical and pre-clinical medical school with the name of the Welsh National School of Medicine, and in 1931 it became an independent institution of the University of Wales.

Plans to combine the school with the University Hospital of Wales were unveiled in 1951, implemented under the provostship of Alan Trevor Jones, and realised in 1971.

The name was further changed in 1984, to University of Wales College of Medicine.

=== Re-merger with Cardiff University ===
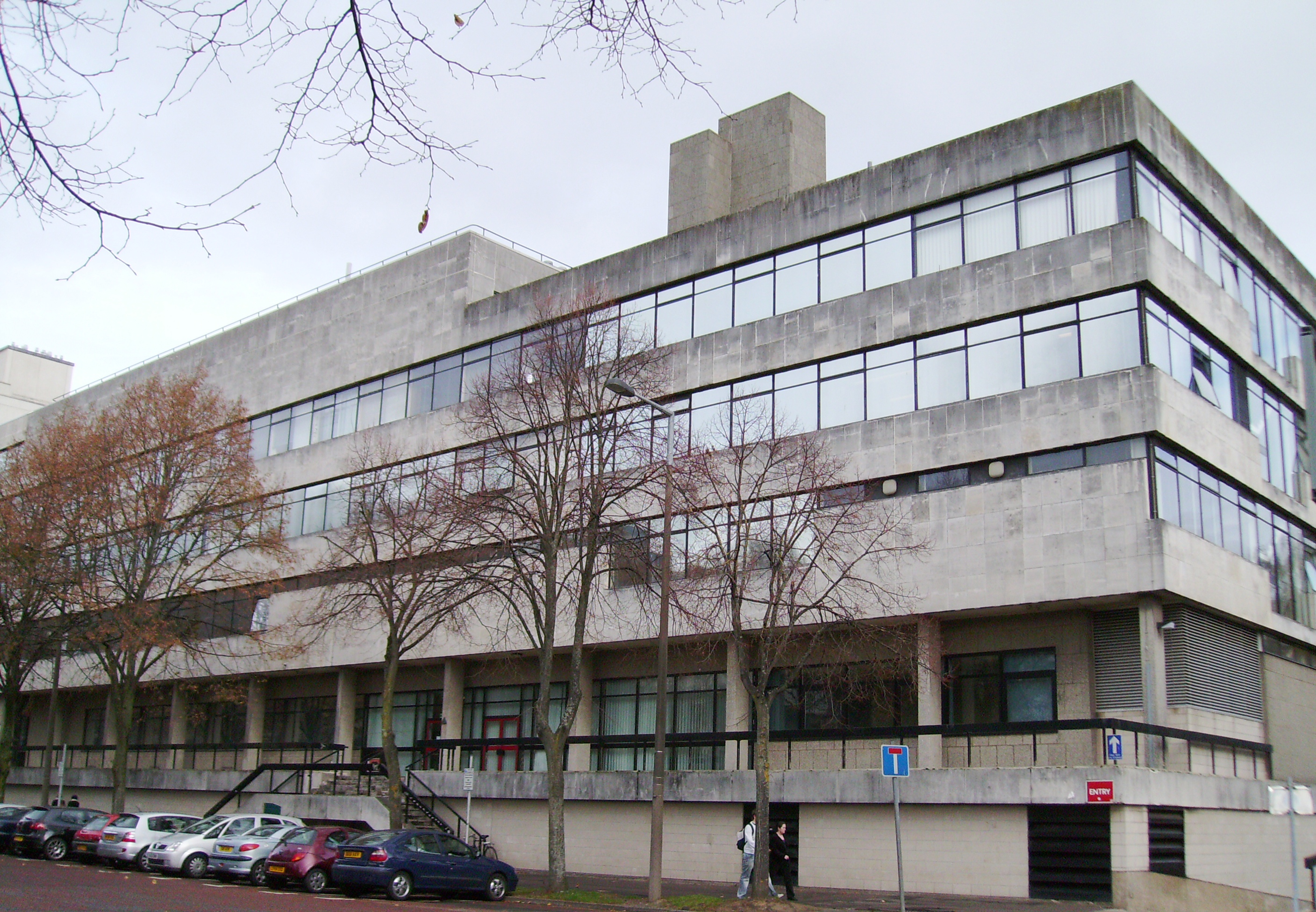
The Sir Martin Evans building, which houses pre-clinical teaching at the School of Medicine

In 2002, ideas were floated to re-merge Cardiff with the University of Wales College of Medicine (UWCM) following the publication of the Welsh Assembly Government's review of higher education in Wales. This merger became effective on 1 August 2004, on which date Cardiff University ceased to be a constituent institution of the University of Wales and became an independent "link institution" affiliated to the federal University. The process of the merger was completed on 1 December 2004 when the Act of Parliament transferring UWCM's assets to Cardiff University received Royal Assent. On 17 December it was announced that the Privy Council had given approval to the new Supplemental Charter and had granted university status to Cardiff, legally changing the name of the institution to Cardiff University. Cardiff awarded University of Wales degrees to students admitted before 2005, but these have been replaced by Cardiff degrees. Medicine, dentistry and other health-related areas began to admit students for Cardiff degrees in 2006.

In 2004, Cardiff University and the Swansea University entered a partnership to provide a four-year graduate-entry medical degree. An annual intake of around 70 post-graduate students undertook an accelerated version of the Cardiff course at the Swansea University for the first two years before joining undergraduate students at Cardiff for the final two years. However, from September 2010 Swansea University began independently providing medical education in a revised 4-yr Graduate Entry Degree.

In 2005, The Wales College of Medicine, which is part of the university, launched the North Wales Clinical School in Wrexham in collaboration with the North East Wales Institute of Higher Education in Wrexham and Bangor University, previously University of Wales, Bangor, and with the National Health Service in Wales. This has been funded with £12.5 million from the Welsh Assembly and will lead to the trebling of the number of trainee doctors in clinical training in Wales over a four-year period.

By 2008 the medical school it had an intake of some 305 British medical students per year and an additional 25 students from overseas. This is based on a total number of students interviewing being around 1000-1500 and a total number of applications around 3100.

In November 2011 Cardiff University's School of Medicine officially opened the Cochrane Building, a health education centre offering students the latest teaching, library and simulation facilities. The centre's facilities include a Clinical Skills Centre, a high-technology medical simulation centre and a new library. The Cochrane Building provides teaching and learning facilities for all healthcare schools based on the Heath Park Campus and is named after the university's medical pioneer, Archie Cochrane.

In 2012, Cardiff University's School of Medicine and 'Meducation' hosted the Wales Medical Undergraduate Conference, the first national undergraduate medical conference held in Wales, with over 100 posters, and 15 oral presentations taking place and attendees from throughout Europe.

== Medicine course ==
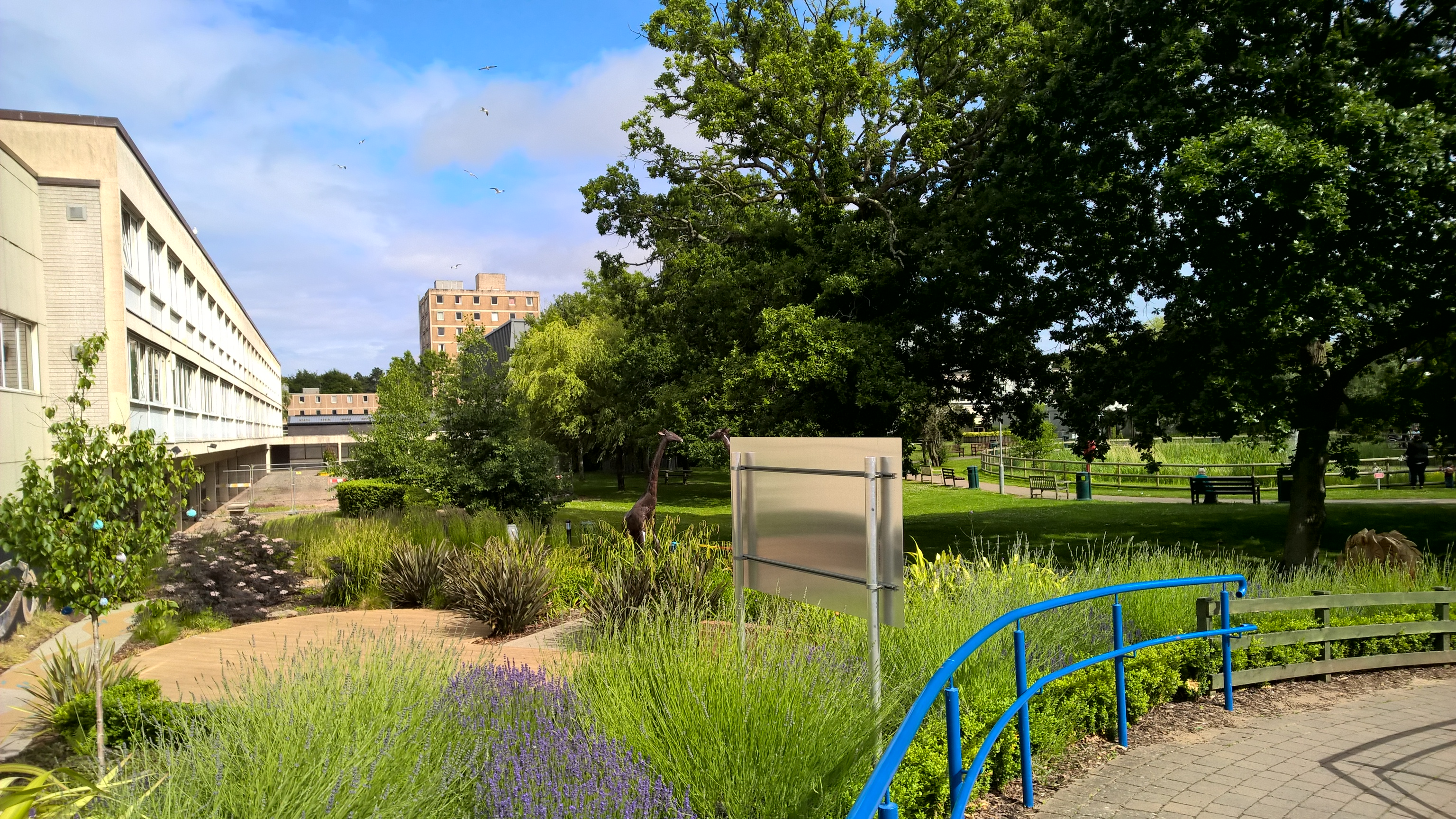
The gardens at the Heath Park site

The school's offers an MBBCh in Medicine course and clinical placements occurs in partnership with over a dozen NHS Trusts and over 150 general practices, covering the whole of Wales.

C21 Curriculum

In 2013, Cardiff School of Medicine launched a major redevelopment of its undergraduate medical education programme. C21 resulted from a comprehensive review of the undergraduate curriculum, its delivery and the supporting structures, mechanisms and processes and improve the quality of the medical education delivered at Cardiff University. Led by the Division of Medical Education, and in partnership with colleagues from across the university, student and patient representatives, the NHS and Welsh Assembly Government, C21 consisted of 5 coordinated projects.

Intercalated programmes

Some undergraduate students have the opportunity to undertake an intercalated year between Year 3 and Year 4, or between Year 4 and Year 5, of the course. These years can be undertaken in any other higher education institute outside of Cardiff Medical School.

=== Number of places ===
In 2016–17, a total of 294 medical students enrolled at Cardiff Medical School, including 74 from Wales. For 2024, 270 places will be offered to home or EU students and 25 from overseas for the five year undergraduate medicine course. 10 places will be offered for the four year graduate course from a recognised feeder course; Medical Pharmacology; Biomedical Science (Cardiff University) and Medical Sciences (Bangor University or University of South Wales). Applicants for this course can apply to join Year Two of the A100 five-year programme.

== Medical science ==
=== Undergraduate courses ===
The school offers an undergraduate Medical Pharmacology (BSc) course.

Post-graduate taught (PGT) schemes

A wide range of post-graduate taught (PGT) schemes is also offered. The school is the largest provider of medically related PGT courses in the UK. These include both conventional and distance learning courses. Many courses are aimed specifically at qualified doctors and health care professionals, such as the Diploma in Practical Dermatology and the MSc in psychiatry.

=== Institutes ===
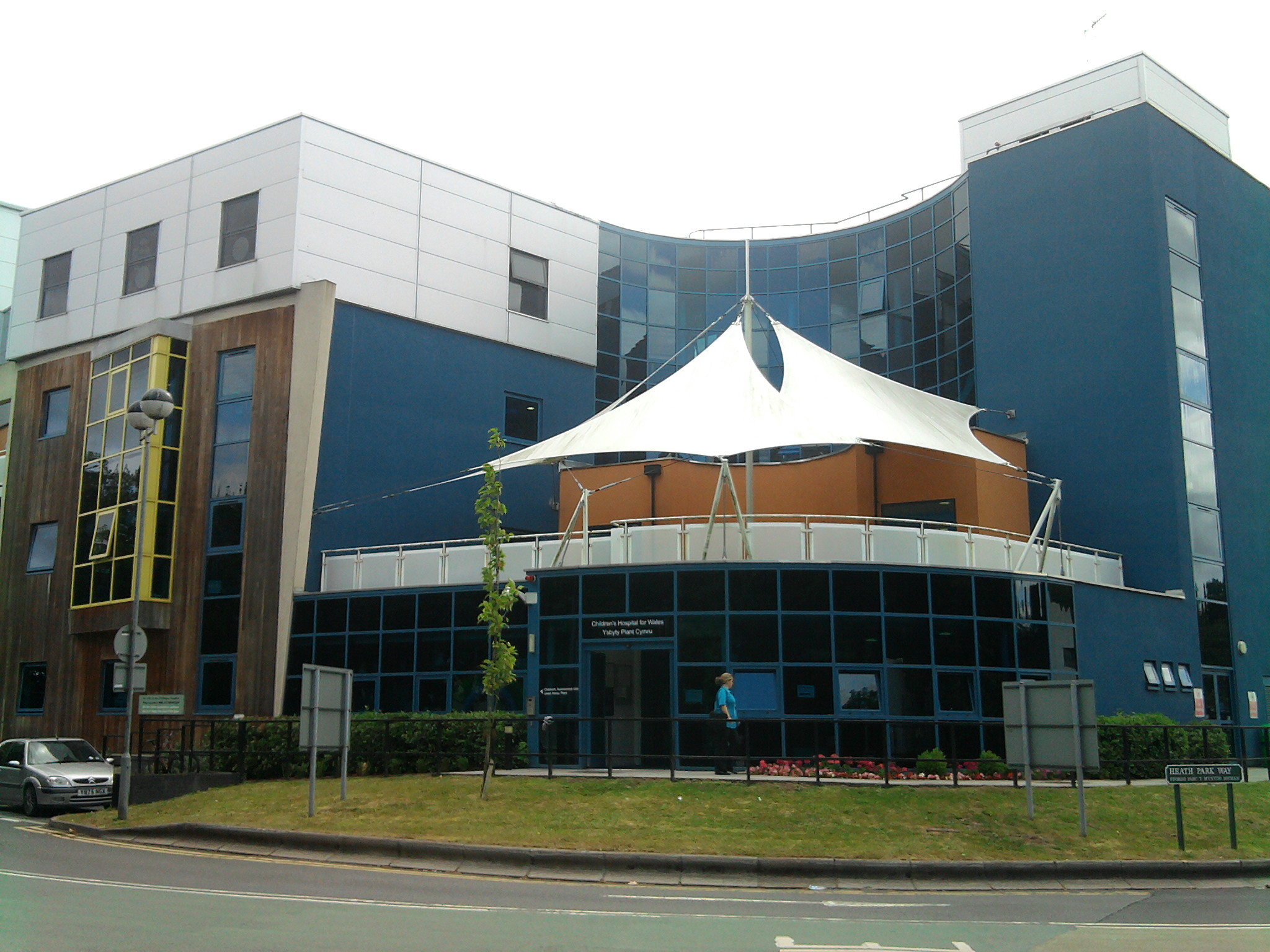
The Children's Hospital for Wales at the Heath Park site

Across the school, five institutes lead research that covers a spectrum from basic laboratory science to bedside practice. These are the Institute of Psychological Medicine and Clinical Neurosciences, the Institute of Infection & Immunity, the Institute of Primary Care & Public Health, the Institute of Cancer & Genetics, and the Institute of Molecular & Experimental Medicine. Alongside these research Institutes, core functions of the school are provided by the Institute of Medical Education and the Institute of Translation, Innovation, Methodology & Engagement (TIME).

Research facilities have recently been enhanced with the £11m Henry Wellcome Building for Biomedical Research in Wales. The building includes 4500 square metres of laboratories and equipment for research into Infection & Immunity, Cancer Biology and Psychiatric Genetics, adjacent to a purpose-built Clinical Research Facility. The Henry Wellcome Building is the largest development of its kind ever undertaken in Wales.

Notable recent successes include the establishment of a Medical Research Council-funded translational research collaboration with Bristol University (called SARTRE), and the award of an MRC Centre in Neuropsychiatric Genetics and Genomics– the first MRC Centre in Wales and the first aimed specifically at harnessing the genetics revolution for research in mental disorders.

The school also houses the Institute of Medical Genetics, winner of a 2007 Queen's Anniversary Prize.

== Clubs and societies ==
Cardiff University medical students are able to join both all the Cardiff University clubs and societies, and also clubs and societies run specifically for students studying medicine, and in some cases other healthcare sciences. These clubs and societies are run by Cardiff Medsoc which is the Medsoc within Cardiff University Students' Union.

== Alumni and faculty ==
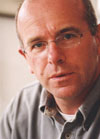
Glyn Elwyn

There are many distinguished alumni of the Cardiff University School of Medicine. These include;

=== Staff ===
- Archie Cochrane, pioneer of scientific method in medicine
- Stephen Dunnett, neuroscientist
- Alun Davies, biologist
- Tudor Morley Griffith, professor of the Department of Diagnostic Radiology

=== Students ===
- Sir Clement Price Thomas, surgeon to George VI
- Thomas Lewis, pioneer of Electrocardiography
- Raman Viswanathan, pioneer of Chest Medicine in India and Padma Bhushan awardee
- Sir Keith Peters, Regius Professor of Physic at the University of Cambridge
- Sir Leszek Borysiewicz, 345th Vice-Chancellor of the University of Cambridge
- Annapoorna Kini, a cardiologist at Mount Sinai Hospital, New York, has the distinction of performing more coronary interventions annually than any other woman in the U.S.
- Alice Roberts, clinical anatomist
- Azeem Majeed, Professor of Primary Care and Public Health at Imperial College London.
- Glyn Elwyn, health services research and current Dartmouth College Professor
- Muzlifah Haniffa, professor of immunology and dermatology at Newcastle University

Alumni have also gone onto success in professional sports, such as Wales international rugby union players Jamie Roberts, Hallam Amos, and Gwyn Jones (the latter captained Wales whilst at medical school).

Cardiff has two Nobel Laureates on its staff, Sir Martin Evans and Robert Huber. A number of Cardiff University staff have been elected as Fellows of the Royal Society, these include Graham Hutchings, professor of Physical Chemistry and Director of the Cardiff Catalysis Institute, School of Chemistry and Ole Holger Petersen, director of Cardiff School of Biosciences. Medical graduate, Professor Azeem Majeed, is Head of the Department of Primary Care and Public Health at Imperial College London.

== Notable incidents ==
=== Examination errors, August 2009 ===
In August 2009, the General Medical Council asked the School of Medicine to carry out a full investigation after serious errors were made in the qualifying Final MB Examination. One student, who was told they had failed, was found to have passed after an appeal. The appeals process revealed that 4 students had been told they had passed the examination but, in fact, had failed. The 4 had already gone through the graduation process and had been registered as doctors by the General Medical Council. They were subsequently suspended from practice. This was said to be due to a "clerical error".

=== Investigation into research misconduct, September 2012 ===
Following allegations of research misconduct in 2012, a formal investigation was launched into the laboratory of the dean of medicine, Paul Morgan. The formal investigation panel, after a six-month investigation, cleared the dean and his colleagues of the charges, though four allegations of image manipulation against a former member of staff were upheld. Two retractions were published on 7 November 2013 in the journal "Cancer Research". A retraction of another paper was published in the Journal of Immunology in 2011. A 2014 retraction, the 4th, has been published in the journal Molecular Immunology. A fifth retraction was published on 21 November 2021 in the journal Nucleic Acids Research https://academic.oup.com/nar/article/49/21/12606/6426056?login=false

=== Anaphylaxis Incident ===
In June 2016, a complaint was received by the School of Medicine regarding a student comedy revue, entitled Anaphylaxis. An investigation was carried out by the former President of the Royal College of Psychiatrists, Dinesh Bhugra, and subsequently reported that a number of students had been involved in an impersonation of a lecturer at the school through 'Black face', which was both racist and homophobic in nature. The associated Wales Deanery and Health Education Improvement Wales have been criticised by the Welsh Assembly Government for being institutionally, organisationally and structurally racist with practices that hinder the professional development of doctors and dentists from black and ethnic minority groups.

== See also ==
- Medical education in Wales
- Medical school in the United Kingdom
- List of medical schools in the United Kingdom

== Bibliography ==
- Morgan, Prys (1997), University of Wales 1939-1993, Cardiff: University of Wales Press, ISBN 0-7083-1437-6
- Roberts, Alun (2008), The Welsh National School of Medicine, 1893-1931: The Cardiff Years, Cardiff: University of Wales Press, ISBN 978-0708321744
- Williams, J Gwyn (1997), The University of Wales, 1893-1931, Cardiff
