= Tudor Morley Griffith =

British radiologist (1951–2011)

Tudor Morley Griffith (2 June 1951 – 17 November 2011) was a British radiologist and professor of the Department of Diagnostic Radiology at the School of Medicine, Cardiff University.

== Early life and education ==
Griffith was born in Gowerton, Wales. He attended Trinity College, Cambridge, as an Open Scholar in 1969, graduating with a double first in theoretical physics in 1972 and continuing his studies at the Cavendish Laboratory until 1973. He later returned to Wales to study medicine, qualifying as a doctor from the Welsh National School of Medicine in 1978, gaining his MRCP in 1981, specializing in radiology, and becoming a Fellow of the Royal College of Radiologists (FRCR) in 1986. He completed his PhD in 1990.

Tudor married Dr. Jayne Barry, and they have three sons Richard, Robert and David. And he also has a daughter Kate from first marriage.

== Academia life ==
Tudor started his career at the Department of Cardiology in Cardiff, directed by Prof. Andrew Henderson, researching the Endothelium-derived relaxing factor (EDRF, later identified as nitric oxide). He received a Young Investigators Annual Research Award from the British Cardiac Society in 1983. The research findings were published in Nature in 1984. This work formed the basis of Tudor's PhD thesis and led him to the Young Investigators Award at the British Cardiac Society in 1983. Further work on this topic earned him the Pfizer National Academic Award for Biological Research in 1988.

Later, combining his scientific background in theoretical physics and medicine, he studied the effect of vasomotor properties of the endothelium on the growth and behavior of microvascular networks. He developed several models, including one of the vascular network in the rabbit ear. Later his research focussed on the role of the endothelium-derived hyperpolarizing factor (EDHF) and in particular on the role of gap junctions.

He conducted research in three areas: endothelial control of arterial tone by nitric oxide (NO) and endothelium-derived hyperpolarizing factor (EDHF), applications of "Chaos Theory" and nonlinear mathematics in the analysis of microcirculatory perfusion and modelling of the cellular mechanisms that underpin smooth muscle contraction, and applications of computational fluid dynamics and magnetic resonance angiography in large artery haemodynamics.

=== Professional ===
Griffith was a member of the Royal College of Physicians, joining in 1981. He became a Fellow of the Royal College of Radiologists in 1986. He was also a member of the Management group of the Wales Heart Research Institute and also the Cardiff University/Cardiff and Vale NHS Trust Joint Imaging Strategy Group for MRI and PET. He was chair of the Cardiovascular Interdisciplinary Research Group at Cardiff University, beginning in 2004, and a member of the Cardiff University School of Medicine Research Committee.

=== Patents ===
Griffith held 3 patents:

1. Gap junctions and edhf. Univ Wales Medicine July 2004: EP1435925
2. Gap junctions and EDHF. June 2003: US 20030105165
3. Gap junctions and endothelial-derived hyperpolarizing factor (edhf). University Of Wales College Of Medecine April 2003: WO 2003/032964

== Memorial Lectures ==
The first of a series of Tudor Griffith Memorial Lectures was given in the Tenth anniversary EDHF Meeting on 28 June 2012 at Abbey of Vaux-de-Cernay. A Memorial Lecture in honor of Tudor Griffith was also given at the 7th meeting of the European Study Group on Cardiovascular Oscillations (ESGCO) in Kazimierz Dolny, Poland on April 22–25, 2012.
