= Azeem Majeed =

British medical researcher and public health consultant

- Education: University of Wales College of Medicine
- Known for: Research in primary care
- Medical career
- Institutions: Imperial College London
- Sub-specialties: General practice and public health medicine

Azeem Majeed is a Professor and Head of the Department of Primary Care & Public Health in the School of Public Health at Imperial College, London, as well as a general practitioner in South London and a consultant in public health. In the most recent UK University Research Excellence Framework results (published in 2022), Imperial College London was the highest ranked university in the UK for the quality of research in the "Public Health, Health Services and Primary Care" unit of assessment.

== Professional roles ==
Majeed is a graduate of the University of Wales College of Medicine (now the Cardiff University School of Medicine). He moved to London in the 1990s and became a lecturer in the department of Epidemiology and Public Health Medicine at St. George's Hospital Medical School, followed by senior lecturer posts at the School of Public Policy and the Department of Primary Care and Population Sciences at University College London (UCL), becoming professor there in 2002 after being awarded a personal chair. He moved to Imperial College London in 2004 to take up his current post. Majeed is also currently an honorary consultant in public health with the Imperial College Healthcare NHS Trust in London and in the past with the UK Health Security Agency.

Majeed was Director of the National Institute for Health Research (NIHR) Applied Research Collaboration (ARC) Programme for NW London from 2019 to 2026; and was associate director (Primary Care) for the NIHR Diabetes Research Network from 2005 to 2015. In 2026, he established the Health Research Centre (HRC) NW London which is located in the Public Health and Primary Care Directorate at the Imperial College Healthcare NHS Trust. The Centre aims to brings together academic, NHS, local government, industry, and patient and public partners to address key health challenges in NW London.

Majeed spent seven years (1997–2004) working part-time as a medical adviser at the UK Office for National Statistics (ONS), where he acquired considerable expertise in the analysis of data from health information systems, vital statistics, NHS databases and health surveys. Majeed has published over 500 academic articles; has over 300,000 citations of his work; and has an H-index of 168. He is the highest cited researcher globally in the primary care category on Google Scholar and also among the highest cited researchers at Imperial College London.

Majeed's career has been highlighted in a number of articles, including in the BMJ. This includes his status a role model for younger doctors and researchers; and his contribution to research in areas such as public health, primary care and global health. His research has included studies looking at the quality of care delivered by general practices in England, and in 2021 he co-authored findings on rates of infection, serious illness and death in ethnic minority groups during the COVID-19 pandemic in the UK.

== Education ==
Majeed gained admission to the University of Wales College of Medicine (now the Cardiff University School of Medicine) to study medicine in 1980, and subsequently qualified as a medical doctor in 1985. He later worked in clinical posts in South Wales and Gloucester, completing the MRCGP (FRCGP) and MFPH (FFPH) exams. He is also a Fellow of the Royal College of Physicians. Early in his clinical career, he worked in South Wales where he saw the effects of working in the coal mining industry on health; particularly, on lung disease. He also saw the effects of poverty on ill-health. Majeed completed doctoral studies and was awarded his MD by the University of Wales in 1996.

== Career ==
Majeed moved to London in the 1990s. He became a lecturer in the department of Epidemiology and Public Health Medicine at St. George's Hospital Medical School before moving to a senior lecturer post at both the School of Public Policy and the Department of Primary Care and Population Sciences at University College London (UCL). After moving to London, Majeed continued his clinical work with roles in both general practice and in emergency medicine in addition to his academic work.

In 2000, he was awarded a primary care senior scientist award and subsequently concentrated on research. In 2002, he became professor at UCL. In 2004 he was appointed Professor of Primary Care & Public Health and Head of the Department of Primary Care and Public Health in the School of Public Health at Imperial College London. He still spends some time working as a general practitioner in South London.

== Research ==
Majeed is a pioneer in developing methods to the use data from NHS medical records and from routine health information systems to answer key research questions of public health importance. The aim of this work has been to influence health policy; improve healthcare efficiency and health outcomes; and reduce health inequalities. Majeed's quantitative work has been supplemented with research using other research methods such as systematic reviews and qualitative methods. This work has allowed Majeed to contribute effectively as a government adviser and a public educator on key health challenges.

In one of his early projects, Majeed developed a method for linking data from census records with postcode data in NHS population registers. This linkage allowed deprivation indices to be developed for general practices, which in turn led to research showing the importance of socio-economic factors on the performance of general practices in key areas such as screening. Subsequent work using large-scale data analyses showed the importance of factors such as deprivation and case-mix on NHS prescribing costs, hospital admission rates and mortality among inpatients; and the need for NHS resource allocation models to incorporate such factors to ensure a more equitable distribution of NHS funding across England.

Majeed used data from linked primary care–secondary care records to show that achievement of quality targets in primary care improved outcomes for people with type 2 diabetes; these included a reduction in death rates, hospital admission rates and clinical outcomes such as amputation and retinopathy, but had little effect on ethic disparities in the quality of care. Majeed's rigorous analyses highlighted the need for the NHS to invest in such secondary prevention programmes and contributed important data for the Government Review of the NHS Primary Care Quality and Outcomes Framework in England in 2023. In other work, Majeed investigated how primary care influences health outcomes in countries such as Brazil; showing the need for a strong primary care infrastructure as a key component of a health system that improves access to care, provides universal health coverage and reduces health inequalities.

At the UK Office for National Statistics, Majeed established a system for monitoring deaths from drugs that was used to evaluate the impact of public health interventions to reduce these deaths, such as restrictions on the sale of paracetamol. This work provided evidence for the effectiveness of the intervention and for its continuation.

=== COVID-19 pandemic ===
In 2020, he co-authored an editorial which stated that most of the UK deaths in doctors from COVID-19 during the COVID-19 pandemic in the UK were aged over 60 and from ethnic minority backgrounds. In January 2021, during the COVID-19 vaccination programme in the United Kingdom, he relayed concerns of the distribution of COVID-19 vaccines. In the same month, he was co-author of a collaborative study between St George's University, Manchester University and Harvard University, which showed that during the pandemic "people from ethnic minority groups have experienced higher rates of infection, serious illness and death." Majeed and his team have also published work on international comparisons of COVID-19 control strategies. Majeed has published extensively on many areas related to COVID-19 such as vaccination and on topics such as protecting the health of medical professionals during the pandemic and returning to exercise after a COVID-19 infection. Majeed was one of the first to show that patients admitted to NHS hospitals with COVID-19 had worse outcomes than those admitted with influenza; confirming that COVID-19 was not "just like flu" and was having a major impact on bed occupancy and the provision of NHS care. In subsequent work with NHS England, he showed the important role of COVID-19 vaccination in reducing hospital admissions in England in 2021, which provided evidence for continued booster vaccinations of high-risk groups such as the elderly.

== Media coverage and public health advocacy ==
Majeed has used his expertise in clinical medicine and public health to promote positive public health messages during the COVID-19 pandemic that will help to promote beneficial changes in behaviour at both individual and population level. He is a strong advocate of vaccination, which he believes is the best long-term method of limiting the impact of COVID-19 in the UK and the rest of the world. He has given many interviews about the COVID-19 pandemic for the broadcast media - including for the BBC, Sky News, ITV News, Channel 4 News, Times Radio, and LBC. He has also written or contributed quotes to articles for the print media - including the Guardian, Financial Times, Sunday Times, the Independent and the Daily Mirror. Majeed also writes a weekly health column for the Daily Express (a UK-based national newspaper).

Majeed has worked with the NHS at local and national level to promote positive public health messages in areas such as wearing face masks, following government COVID-19 regulations, and vaccination. Majeed's team has a wide range of work on societal engagement; for example, working with local schools to support children from deprived backgrounds enter the health professions, addressing vaccine hesitancy, and improving confidence and uptake of vaccination in marginalised groups.

Majeed was a member of the BMJ COVID-19 Group that published articles on the UK response to the pandemic. He was first author of a paper in this series that examined the UK COVID-19 vaccination programme. Majeed was also a member of the Lancet Commission on the Future of the NHS, where he led on primary care (e.g. workforce) and public health challenges. Majeed was a member of the Expert Advisory Panel for the BMJ's Future Shocks series, which addresses emerging challenges in global health. He was the first author of one article in this series describing how the UK can use its public health and clinical informatics infrastructure to provide data for guiding policies during a future health crisis. He was also last author of a second paper in this series. The involvement in the work of these two leading medical journals highlights Majeed's standing as a thought leader in primary care and public health.

== Career awards ==
Majeed was selected as one of the 50 most influential GPs in the UK by the professional GP magazine Pulse for five consecutive years (2015, 2016, 2017, 2018 and 2019). In 2017, he won the Lambeth CCG Award for Outstanding Contribution to Primary Care, which reflects the contribution he has made to primary care in Lambeth in his 30 years as a GP, in addition to his national and international roles. Majeed is a Fellow of the Academy of Medical Sciences (FMedSci), Fellow of the Royal College of Physicians (FRCP), Fellow of the Royal College of General Practitioners (FRCGP) and Fellow of the Faculty of Public Health (FFPH). In 2021, he was appointed as an NIHR Senior Investigator and had his Senior Investigator Award renewed for a second and final four-year term in 2025. He was one of the Imperial College London Team awarded the Queen's Anniversary Prize for Research in 2021 for work on the UK's response to COVID-19. Majeed was also the Winner of the 1992 Winfield Medical Audit Prize.

== Selected publications ==
- Majeed, Azeem; Maile, Edward John; Bindman, Andrew B. (1 June 2020). "The primary care response to COVID-19 in England's National Health Service". Journal of the Royal Society of Medicine. 113 (6): 208–210. doi:10.1177/0141076820931452. ISSN 0141-0768. PMC 7439588. PMID 32521196. (Joint author)
- Majeed, Azeem; Molokhia, Mariam; Pankhania, Bharat; Asanati, Kaveh (1 June 2020). "Protecting the health of doctors during the COVID-19 pandemic" (PDF). British Journal of General Practice. 70 (695): 268–269. doi:10.3399/bjgp20X709925. ISSN 0960-1643. PMC 7219630. PMID 32393502. (Joint author)
- For a Full list of Professor Majeed's publications, see his Google Scholar profile. A list of his publications on COVID-19 can also be viewed via Google Scholar.
