= Florence Thomas (surgeon) =

Welsh ophthalmic surgeon

Florence M. S. Thomas
- Born: Florence Margaret Sarah Price; December 30, 1879; Treorchy
- Died: March 3, 1957 (aged 77); Bournemouth

Florence Margaret Sarah "Florrie" Thomas (née Price; 30 December 1879 – 3 March 1957) was a Welsh ophthalmic surgeon and the first woman to join the medical staff at Swansea Hospital.

== Early life and education ==
Florence Price was born in Treorchy in Glamorgan to Rees Griffiths Price and Elizabeth Mathias. She was brought up in Carmarthen, where her father worked as a general practitioner. She had two brothers, who were both doctors: Ernest Price and Alfred Price. Her sister, Emily Price, worked with their father as a qualified dispenser.

She attended the High School and County Girl's School in Carmarthen. She passed the preliminary examination for degrees in medicine of the Scottish Universities in 1897, aged 17. She attended the University of Edinburgh for the degree of M.B.Ch.B., graduating in 1904. In her first professional examinations in 1900, she obtained the medal in chemistry, was proxime accessit to the prize in anatomy and took honours in botany, zoology and physics.

== Career ==
Starting as house surgeon, Florence Price was appointed house physician to Swansea Hospital in 1904. She was the first woman to join the staff, and, the following year, "the experiment of having a lady doctor" was considered "the most unqualified success". She continued working as a house physician and ophthalmic assistant and was appointed bacteriological assistant. She was described as having "unfailing attention to her duties and her kindness to the patients".

Despite retiring from her position after marrying Francis Thomas in 1908, Florence Thomas returned to medical service during World War I and continued working while raising her family. She was one of only 533 women physicians in Great Britain in 1912.

Florence Thomas practised medicine for forty years, eventually becoming an ophthalmic surgeon at Port Talbot Hospital.

== Personal life ==
Florence Price married Francis Griffith Thomas on 19th Apr 1908 at St Peter's Church, Carmarthen. Francis Thomas also worked as an ophthalmologist at Swansea Hospital. They had four children, including Francis Brian Thomas F.R.C.S, an orthopaedic surgeon.

She was known as Florrie.
