= Swansea Hospital =

Hospital in Swansea (closed 1968)

Swansea General and Eye Hospital
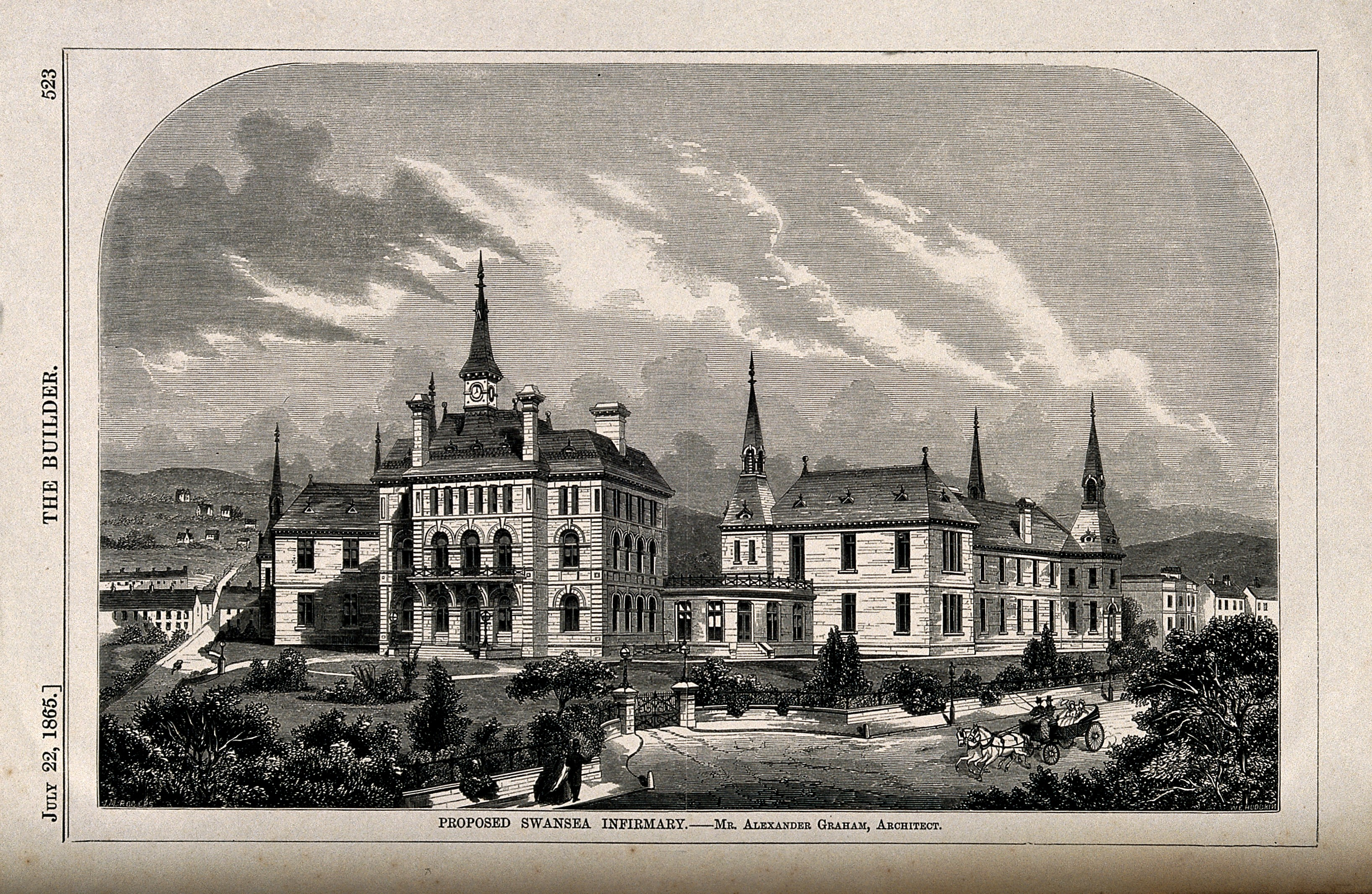

Geography
- Location: St Helen's Road, Swansea, Wales

History
- Former name: Swansea Hospital
- Opened: 1817
- Closed: 1968

Swansea Hospital (known later as Swansea General and Eye Hospital) was a hospital in Swansea, Wales. It closed after the building of Morriston Hospital and Singleton Hospital.

== History ==
Swansea Hospital was founded in 1814 as a dispensary. It became an infirmary from 1817.

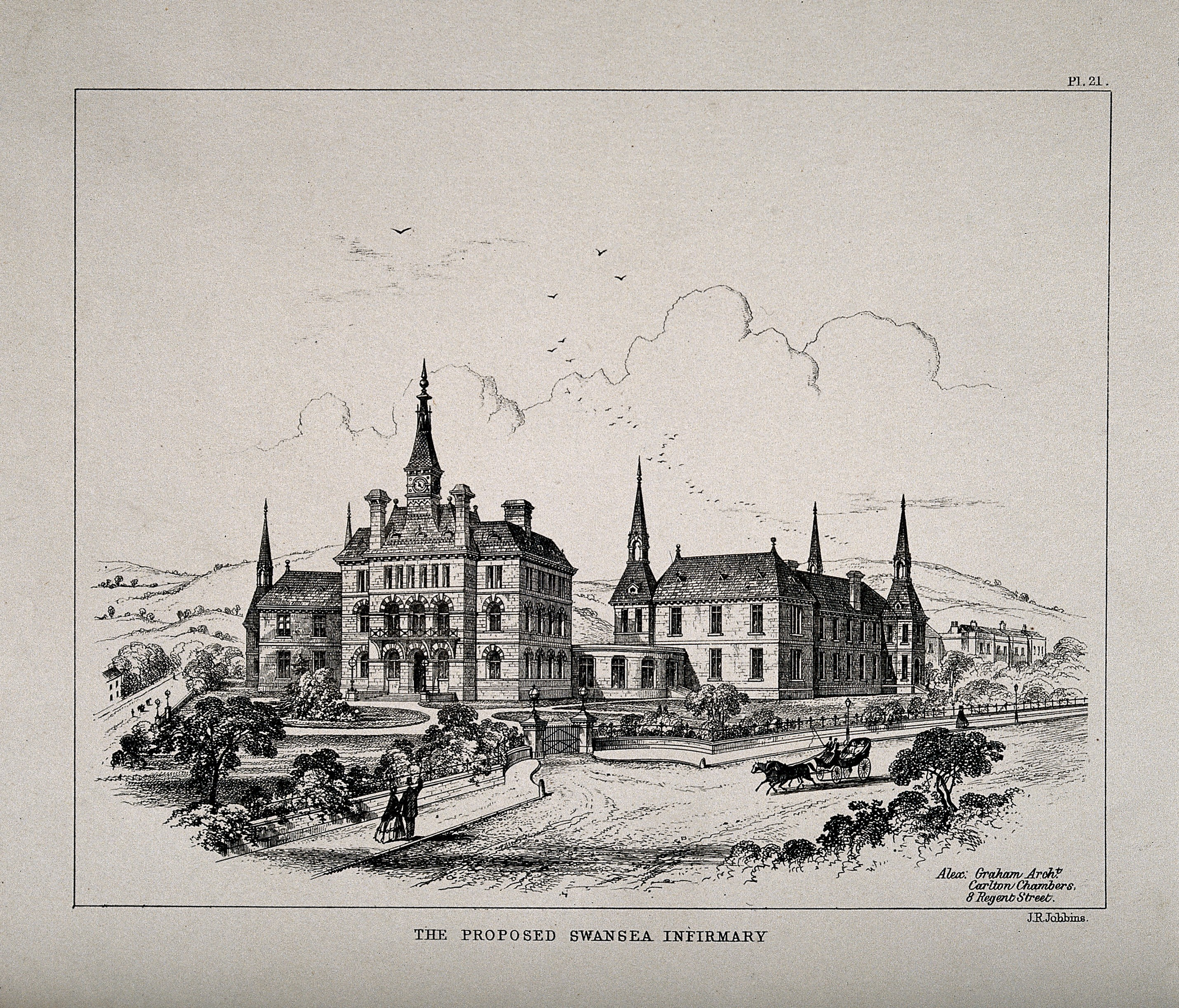
The proposed design for Swansea Infirmary

The hospital was made bigger in 1863, with Florence Nightingale contributing £25 towards the building work that completed in 1878. In 1899, the Eye Hospital was added.

In 1904, Florence Price was appointed house physician, the first woman to join the medical staff.

In the 1920s, the hospital employed over 150 nurses and auxiliaries.

From the opening of Singleton Hospital in the late 1960s, the hospital's use became limited. It was used as a children's orthopaedic centre until this also relocated to Singleton Hospital. Swansea General and Eye Hospital closed in 1968.

== Location ==
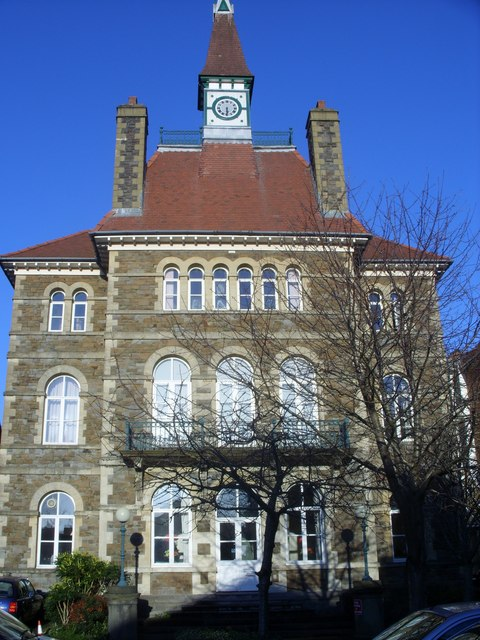
Homegower House photographed in 2008

Swansea Hospital was on the corner of St Helen's Road and Brynymor Road. In the early 1900s, a tram service ran along St Helen's Road, which served the hospital. Only one of the hospital's buildings is still standing. It is now occupied by a residential home called Homegower House.
