= List of stations and halts on the Talyllyn Railway =

A map of the Talyllyn Railway

This is a list of the stations and halts on the Talyllyn Railway (Welsh: Rheilffordd Talyllyn), a 2 ft 3 in (686 mm) narrow gauge preserved railway line running for 7.25 miles (11.67 km) from Tywyn on the Mid-Wales coast to Nant Gwernol near the village of Abergynolwyn. The line was opened in 1866 to carry slate from the quarries at Bryn Eglwys to Tywyn, and was the first narrow gauge railway in Britain authorised by Act of Parliament to carry passengers using steam haulage. Despite severe under-investment, the line remained open, and in 1951 it became the first railway in the world to be preserved as a heritage railway by volunteers.

== Route ==
The main terminus of the line is at Tywyn Wharf (originally known as King's Station, after a local landowner), where the railway's administrative headquarters and the Narrow Gauge Railway Museum are located. Leaving this station the line passes immediately under the A493 Machynlleth to Dolgellau road and enters a long cutting that climbs towards Pendre. From Pendre, the railway climbs up to Ty Mawr bridge and on to Hendy, the first of five minor halts, which serves the adjacent farm. More local halts follow at Fach Goch, and Cynfal, the latter having a small platform. The section from Cynfal to Rhydyronen was relaid in 1951 using rail purchased from the Corris Railway after the latter line's closure in 1948. Rhydyronen, now a request stop, was the first intermediate station built on the line, opening in 1867. Another minor halt follows at Tynllwynhen, before the passing loop and another request halt at Brynglas.

Above Brynglas, the line enters woodlands west of Dolgoch, climbing steadily, then curves to the south east and crosses the Dolgoch gorge on the Dolgoch viaduct. Dolgoch station is immediately east of the viaduct, situated on a left-hand curve at 187 ft (57 m) above sea level, and is the main intermediate station on the line, being popular with tourists visiting the nearby falls. The railway continues in a north easterly direction, passing Quarry Siding, where a halt and passing loop are located. The line continues its ascent towards Abergynolwyn station, situated on a ledge cut into the hillside. This was the original terminus of the statutory railway, beyond which the railway continued as a mineral extension, now converted for passenger use. About three quarters of the way along the 0.75 miles (1.21 km) extension is the site of the Village Incline. From here the line runs into a gorge, high above the river on a narrow ledge, ending at the foot of the first incline leading to the Bryn Eglwys quarry. Nant Gwernol station, the eastern terminus of the line, was built here on the site of a set of three sidings which originally marked the end of the original line.

== List of stations and halts ==
Name	Image	Distance from Towyn Wharf	Elevation	Grid Reference	Notes
Tywyn Wharf		n/a	40 ft (12 m)	SH586004	The line's western terminus and main station. Location of the Narrow Gauge Railway Museum, gift shop and cafe.
Pendre		0.42 miles (0.68 km)	43 ft (13 m)	SH590008	This is a request stop serving the east end of Tywyn. Location of the locomotive and carriage sheds and workshops for the line. A passing loop and 15-lever ground frame is located just to the west of the station, to allow trains to pass here.
Hendy		0.94 miles (1.51 km)	57 ft (17 m)	SH597012	Request stop serving Hendy farm.
Fach goch		1.44 miles (2.32 km)	70 ft (21 m)	SH605017	Request stop on the occupational crossing, serving Fach Goch farm. There was a siding here between 1971 and 1982, used for dumping spoil. This is currently least-used halt on the railway.
Cynfal		1.86 miles (2.99 km)	91 ft (28 m)	grid reference SH610020	Request stop serving Cynfal farm. Has one of the smallest railway platforms in the UK, vying with Pentrepiod Halt on the Bala Lake Railway and Coed y Bleiddiau halt — a private halt on the Ffestiniog Railway – for the title of smallest. Used to be very little used, however has its traffic levels recovered slightly in the early 2010s.
Rhydyronen		2.15 miles (3.46 km)	100 ft (30 m)	SH614021	This was the first intermediate station to be built on the railway, opened in 1867. It has a slate built waiting shelter and is now a request stop. A small slate quarry and manganese mine nearby once used the railway.
Tynllwynhen		2.49 miles (4.01 km)	102 ft (31 m)	SH618025	Request stop serving Tynllwyn-hen farm. Second least used halt on the railway, after Fach-Goch.
Brynglas		3.18 miles (5.12 km)	124 ft (38 m)	SH628030	Serves the hamlet of Pandy. A passing loop and 6-lever ground frame is located just to the west of the station, to allow trains to pass, along with a siding used for engineering trains. In the late 1870s/early 1880s, some slate quarrying was carried out nearby, at the Cwm-Pandy quarry.
Dolgoch		4.90 miles (7.89 km)	187 ft (57 m)	SH650045	Built to provides access, mainly for tourist traffic, to the nearby Dolgoch Falls, which is a popular series of waterfalls. In the late 1870s/early 1880s, some slate quarrying was carried out nearby, at the Dolgoch quarry.
Quarry Siding		5.33 miles (8.58 km)	202 ft (62 m)	SH654050	Request stop, once known as Tanycoed. Formerly served a small shale quarry, which supplied the Talyllyn Railway with ballast for many years. A passing loop and 5-lever ground frame is here to allow trains to pass, and a carriage shed is located here, known as the "Guest House" after a former member of the preservation society whose legacy funded the shed's building.
Abergynolwyn		6.57 miles (10.57 km)	242 ft (74 m)	SH670063	The original passenger terminus of the line. Most trains stop here on the return journey for refreshments, as there are no facilities at Nant Gwernol. The station has a 620 ft (198 m) long platform, capable of holding two trains. This is believed to be the longest platform on a narrow gauge railway in Britain.
Nant Gwernol		7.25 miles (11.67 km)	270 ft (82 m)	SH680065	The passenger station was opened in 1976, at the eastern limit of locomotive working on the mineral railway between Abergynolwyn Station and Bryn-Eglwys, which was at foot of the Alltwyllt incline, the first of two inclines between the Talyllyn Railway and the Bryn-Eglwys Quarry.

== Bibliography ==
- Bate, J.H.L. (2001). The Chronicles of Pendre Sidings. RailRomances. ISBN 1-900622-05-X.
- Boyd, James I.C. (1965). Narrow Gauge Railways in Mid Wales. Oakwood Press. ISBN 0-85361-024-X.
- Boyd, James I.C. (1988). The Tal-y-llyn Railway. Wild Swan Publications Ltd. ISBN 0-906867-46-0.
- Jacobs, Gerald, ed. (March 2005). Railway Track Diagrams: Midlands & North West. Quail Track Diagrams. ISBN 0-9549866-0-1.
- Mitchell, David J. & Eyres, Terry (2005). The Talyllyn Railway. Past and Present Publishing Ltd. ISBN 1-85895-125-9.
- Morland, R. J. (2005). The Talyllyn Railway in Colour. R. J. Morland. ISBN 0-9549893-0-9.
- Potter, D. (1990). The Talyllyn Railway. David St John Thomas. ISBN 0-946537-50-X.
- Rolt, L.T.C. (1998). Railway Adventure. Sutton Publishing. ISBN 0-330-02783-2.
- Rolt, L.T.C., ed. (1965). Talyllyn Century. David & Charles.
