= Rhydyronen railway station =

Railway station in Wales

Rhydyronen
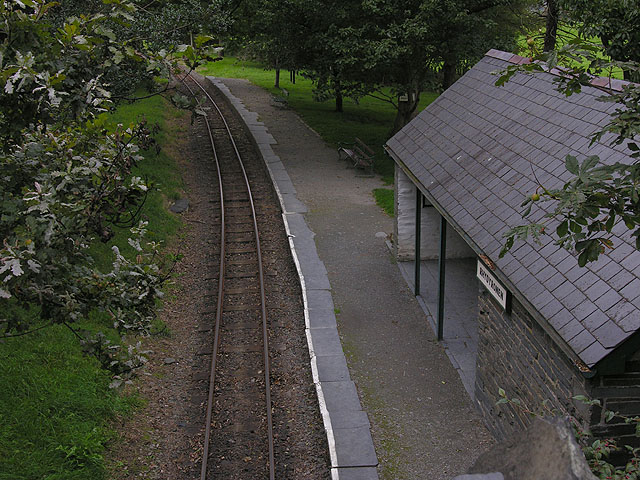
- Rhydyronen station, taken from the road bridge, looking west

General information
- Location: Bryncrug, Gwynedd; Wales
- Coordinates: 52.600°N 4.046°W
- Grid reference: SH614021
- System: Station on heritage railway
- Operator: Talyllyn Railway Preservation Society
- Platforms: 1

History
- Original company: Talyllyn Railway Company

Key dates
- 1867: Opened
- c. 1900: Loop built
- 1951: Operation taken over by Talyllyn Railway Preservation Society
- 1954: Siding removed
- 1957: Loop reinstated
- 1971: Loop west points removed
- 1977: Siding removed
- 1979: Platform extended
Location

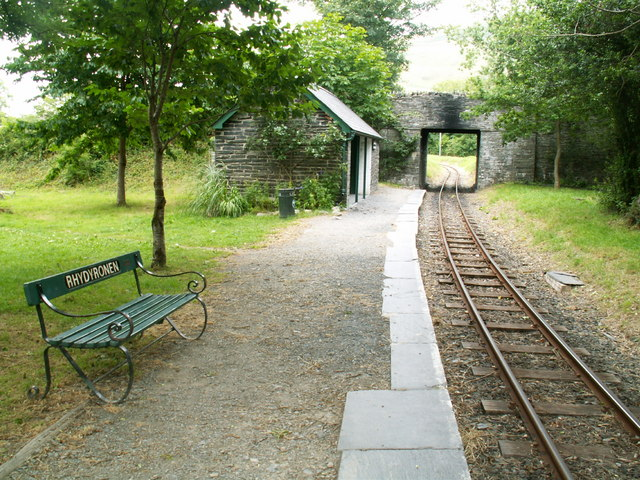
Rhydyronen station, looking east

Rhydyronen railway station (also known as Rhyd-yr-onen railway station) is a request stop on the Talyllyn Railway, near Tywyn, Gwynedd in mid-Wales. It was built in 1867 to serve local farms, and the village of Bryn-crug.

The name 'Rhyd-yr-onen' means 'Ford of the ash tree'.

== Construction ==
The station building and original platform are primarily constructed out of slate blocks from Bryn-Eglwys quarry. The platform surface is slate chippings and is edged with slate slabs. The 1990s platform extension uses concrete breeze blocks.

== History ==
=== Origins and early history ===
The station opened in February 1867, four months after the start of passenger services on the railway. The station is named after a nearby stream, the Nant Rhyd-yr-onnen (this stream is also known as the Nant Braich-y-Rhiw), which itself is named after the road's ford over it, just north of the station (now replaced with a bridge). It is 2.15 miles (3.46 km) along the railway from Tywyn Wharf, and was the first intermediate station to open on the railway. A station building and platform was provided on the north side of the track, as the carriages had been modified to have doors only on this side for safety reasons. Steps were provided to the road on the south side, for passengers wishing to travel (across the track) southwards. The station had a passing loop at its western end, first shown on Ordnance Survey maps in 1901, to serve a slate quarry and manganese mine. A mineral tramway had been planned to serve the mine and quarries, but the necessary agreements were not reached with the local landowner Dr. Corbett. The outputs of the quarries and mine therefore had to be taken by road to the station, and the business soon failed. The loop soon fell into disuse and the west points were removed.

Around the 1930s there appears to have been an accident here involving a goods van, and for several decades the van's body lay rotting beside the road bridge. During the Victorian era, the railway promoted the destination to tourists through references to a nearby chalybeate spring, and bottled water was produced here around the 1910s.

=== Preservation era ===
The siding was still in a good enough condition (relative to the rest of the permanent way of the railway) to be used as a refuge siding in 1951. This allowed the first train operated by the preservation society to run round. The train was hand-shunted past the locomotive, which was stabled in the siding.

The remaining siding was removed during track renewals in early 1954, but it was reinstated, as a full loop, in the winter of 1956/1957, and was usable by late January. The loop was never used as a passing place for public train services during preservation; its main role was as an engineers' siding. Rhydyronen was used for rail storage at the time, and also for the stabling of a locomotive – or the railway's motor trolley following the building of this machine – for the transport of railway volunteers, most notably Hugh Jones, who lived, or were staying on holiday, nearby. The west end points of the new loop were removed in 1971, again because of the economic costs of maintaining the points, of what was a double-ended engineers' siding – which saw limited use. The remaining siding was removed, with the east points, in August 1977.

The platform was extended to accommodate a full-length train in 1979.

== In fiction ==
In The Railway Series by Rev. Wilbert Awdry, and in the fourth season of Thomas & Friends, Cros-ny-Curin station on the Skarloey Railway is based on this station.

Preceding station	Heritage railways	Following station
Cynfal towards Tywyn Wharf	Talyllyn Railway	Tynllwynhen towards Nant Gwernol
