= Abergynolwyn railway station =

Heritage railway station in Gwynedd, Mid-Wales

Abergynolwyn
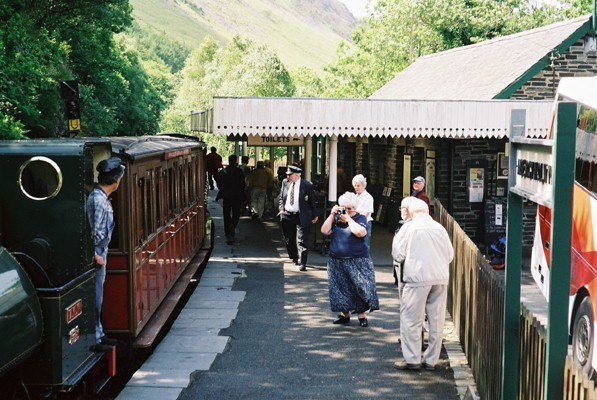
- Abergynolwyn station

General information
- Location: Abergynolwyn, Gwynedd; Wales
- Coordinates: 52°38′19″N 3°57′58″W
- Grid reference: SH670063
- System: Station on heritage railway
- Operator: Talyllyn Railway Preservation Society
- Platforms: 1

History
- Original company: Talyllyn Railway Company

Key dates
- 1866: Opened
- 1951: Operation taken over by Talyllyn Railway Preservation Society
- 1976: Platform extended for two trains
Location

Abergynolwyn railway station is a station on the Talyllyn Railway near Abergynolwyn, Gwynedd, in Mid-Wales. It is 6.55 miles (10.54 km) from Tywyn Wharf. The name 'Abergynolwyn' means 'Mouth-of-the-River-with-a-Whirlpool'.

== History ==
=== Pre-preservation ===
==== Operation ====
Abergynolwyn was the original passenger terminus. A mineral line extended south-west to the incline up to the slate quarry at Bryn Eglwys. The railway's first locomotive shed was at Ty Dwr, 0.25 miles (0.40 km) west of the station. This location was chosen as it had a plentiful water supply from the local stream, and was close to the quarry, which supplied some of the building materials.

From February 1867, passenger trains started from Pendre instead, where the railway's permanent locomotive shed had been built. The siding leading to the locomotive shed at Ty Dwr was removed, but the water column was retained, and was still used until the early 1950s.

==== Buildings and Station layout ====
The original station building was built for the opening of the railway to passenger services in 1867. It was of timber construction – like the station building at Pendre (which was the only other passenger station on the railway when the railway was opened). The station was not built out of slate, like all the other stations on the railway, because it was built before the railway's construction finished, when there was no slate from the Bryn Eglwys quarry to build it out of. A platform was provided for passengers, on the north side of the line.

A siding was provided at the west end of the station, just before the start of the run-round loop. The date at which this was first laid is unknown, but it was between 1889 and 1901; it was taken out of use shortly before the First World War. The siding was reinstated during the Second World War to load pit props from nearby forests to be taken down to Tywyn. The siding was removed again in the early 1950s.

In the 1930s, the station building was replaced, because the original building was in need of extensive repairs which would have been uneconomical to do. The new building was built out of slate blocks, like most of the other buildings on the railway. The west end of the building was used as a lookout post for the Home Guard during the Second World War, and gunports were cut in the west wall of the station.

=== Post-preservation ===
==== Operation ====
The watering point at Ty Dwr fell out of use in the early 1950s, shortly after preservation. In 1955, the tower was removed as the slate was needed to build a retaining wall at the site of a major landslip approximately 1 mile (1.6 km) south of Dolgoch. In December 2018, a project was launched to re-build the water tower.

In 1976, the 0.75 miles (1.21 km)-long mineral extension to the foot of the Alltwyllt incline was re-opened for passenger services. Nant Gwernol was built at the new terminus. Abergynolwyn remains the principal station at the eastern end of the line as it has better passenger facilities than Nant Gwernol.

==== Buildings ====
The station building was replaced again in 1969, with a larger building, also constructed out of slate, as the 1930s structure was both in need of much repair and too small to serve the increasing tourist traffic being carried. This newest building has since been extended to the west, the extension looking externally similar to the original wooden station building.

When the railway was extended to Nant Gwernol, it became necessary to accommodate two trains simultaneously, so the platform was extended to 620 feet (190 m) long, believed to have been the longest platform on a narrow gauge railway in Britain at the time. A signal box with a 14-lever lever frame was also constructed at the same time. The base of the signal box was constructed out of slate blocks salvaged from derelict buildings in the Bryn Eglwys quarry.

On 6 May 1991, a toilet block was opened just to the north-east of the station building.

== In fiction ==
In The Railway Series by Rev. Wilbert Awdry, Skarloey station on the Skarloey Railway was based on this station.

== Gallery ==
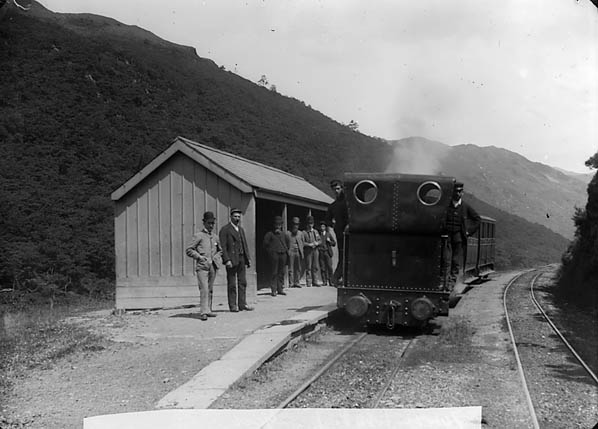
A train in Abergynolwyn station, with the original station building, looking east circa 1885.

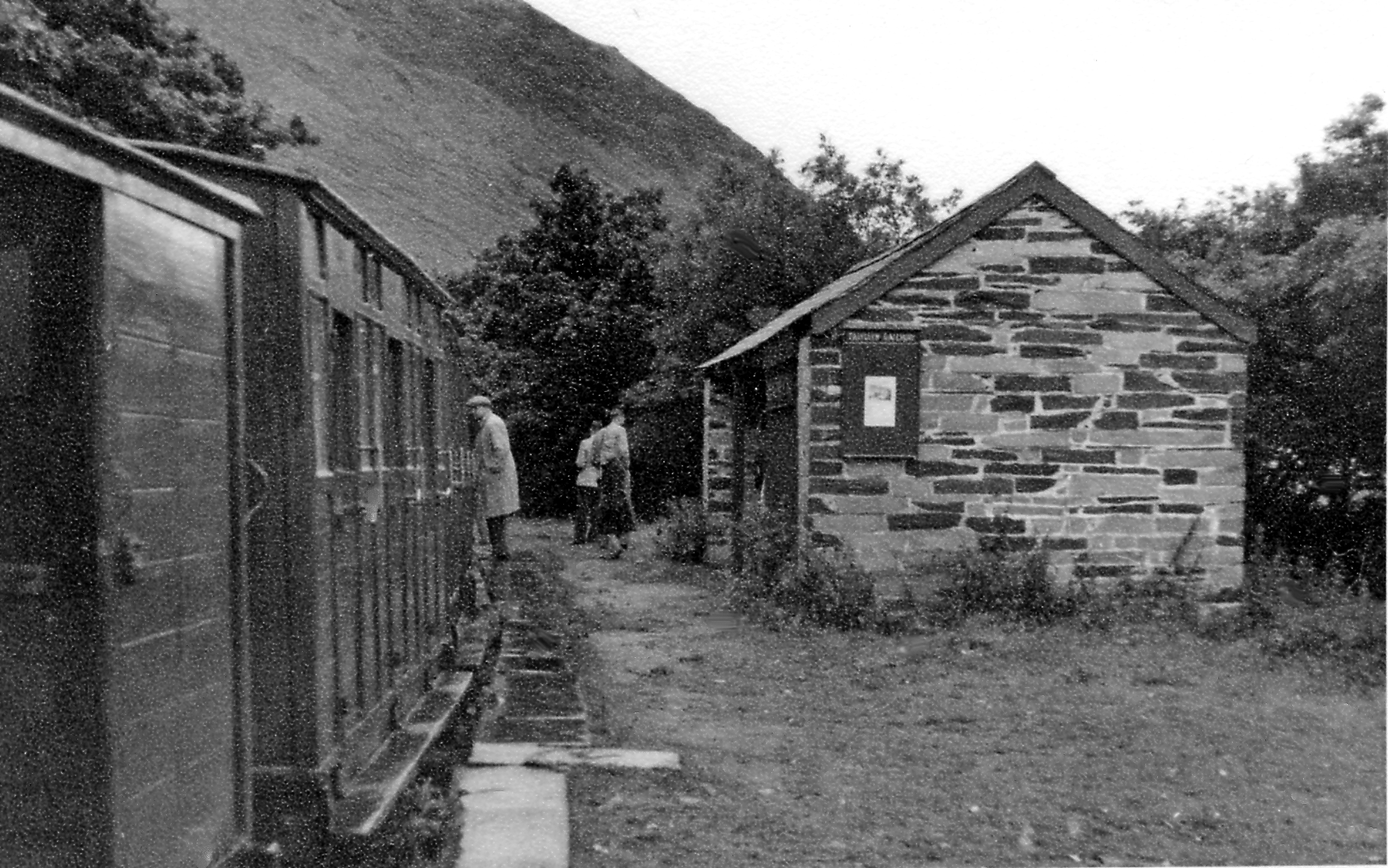
A train in Abergynolwyn station, with the station's second, slate, station building, looking west. 3 August 1951.

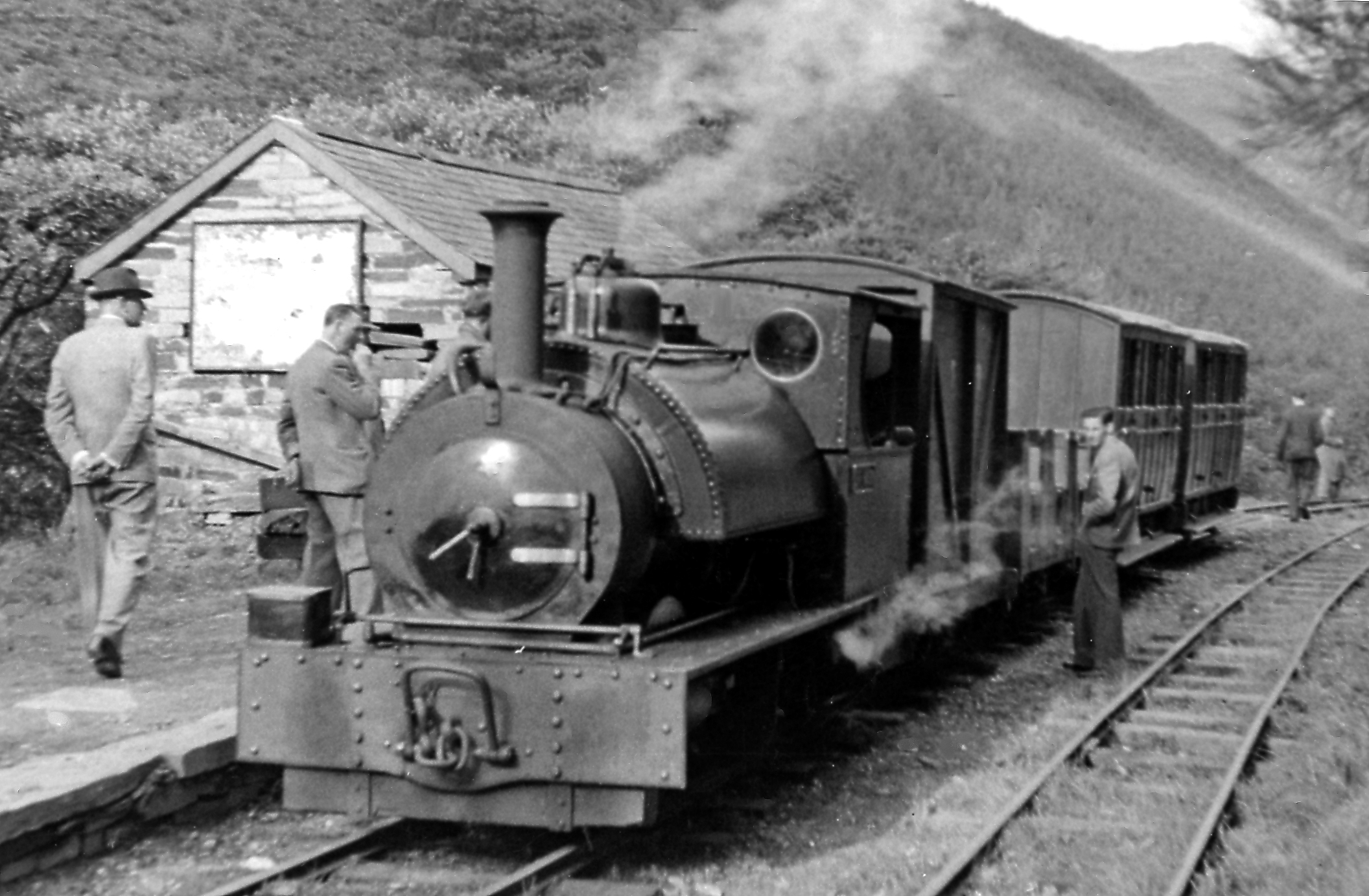
A train in Abergynolwyn station, looking east, 26 September 1953.

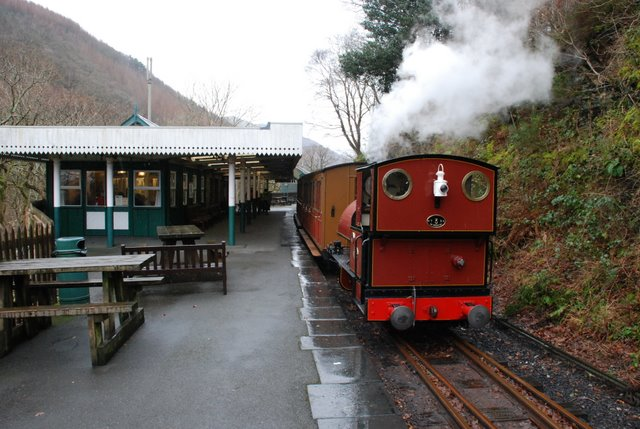
A train in Abergynolwyn station, looking east, 29 December 2009 The newest station, with its western extension, is visible on the left.

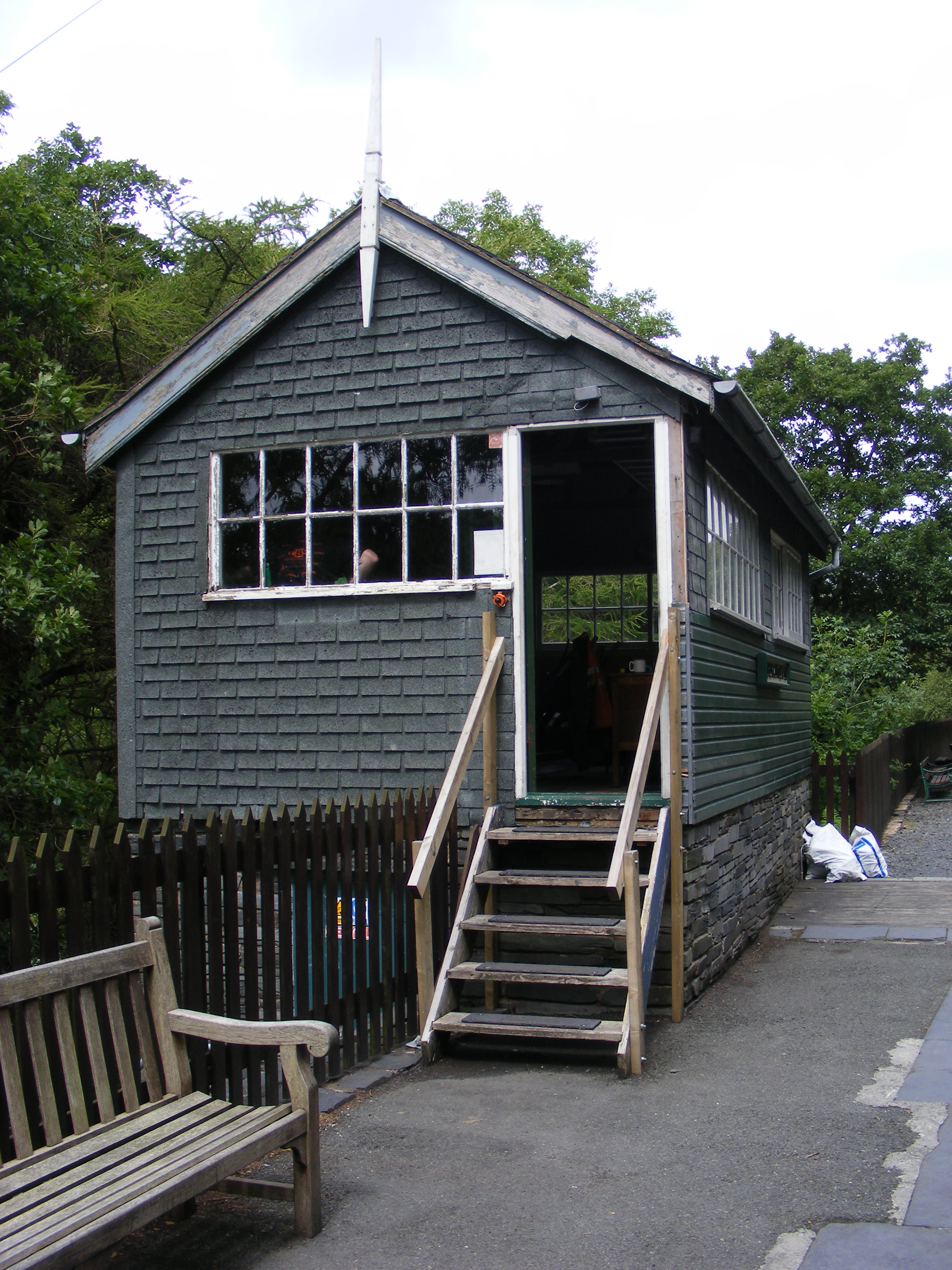
The new signal box at Abergynolwyn.

== Bibliography ==
- Butt, R. V. J. (October 1995). The Directory of Railway Stations: details every public and private passenger station, halt, platform and stopping place, past and present (1st ed.). Sparkford: Patrick Stephens Ltd. ISBN 978-1-85260-508-7. OCLC 60251199. OL 11956311M.
- Caton, Peter (2018). Remote Stations. Leicestershire: Matador. ISBN 978-1-78901-408-2.
- Talyllyn Railway Guide Book
- "Talyllyn Railway route information". Archived from the original on 13 April 2010.
- Jowett, Alan (2000). Jowett's Nationalised Railway Atlas (1st ed.). Penryn, Cornwall: Atlantic Transport Publishers. ISBN 978-0-906899-99-1. OCLC 228266687.

Preceding station	Heritage railways	Following station
Quarry Siding towards Tywyn Wharf	Talyllyn Railway	Nant Gwernol Terminus
