= Dolgoch railway station =

Railway station in Gwynedd, Wales

Dolgoch
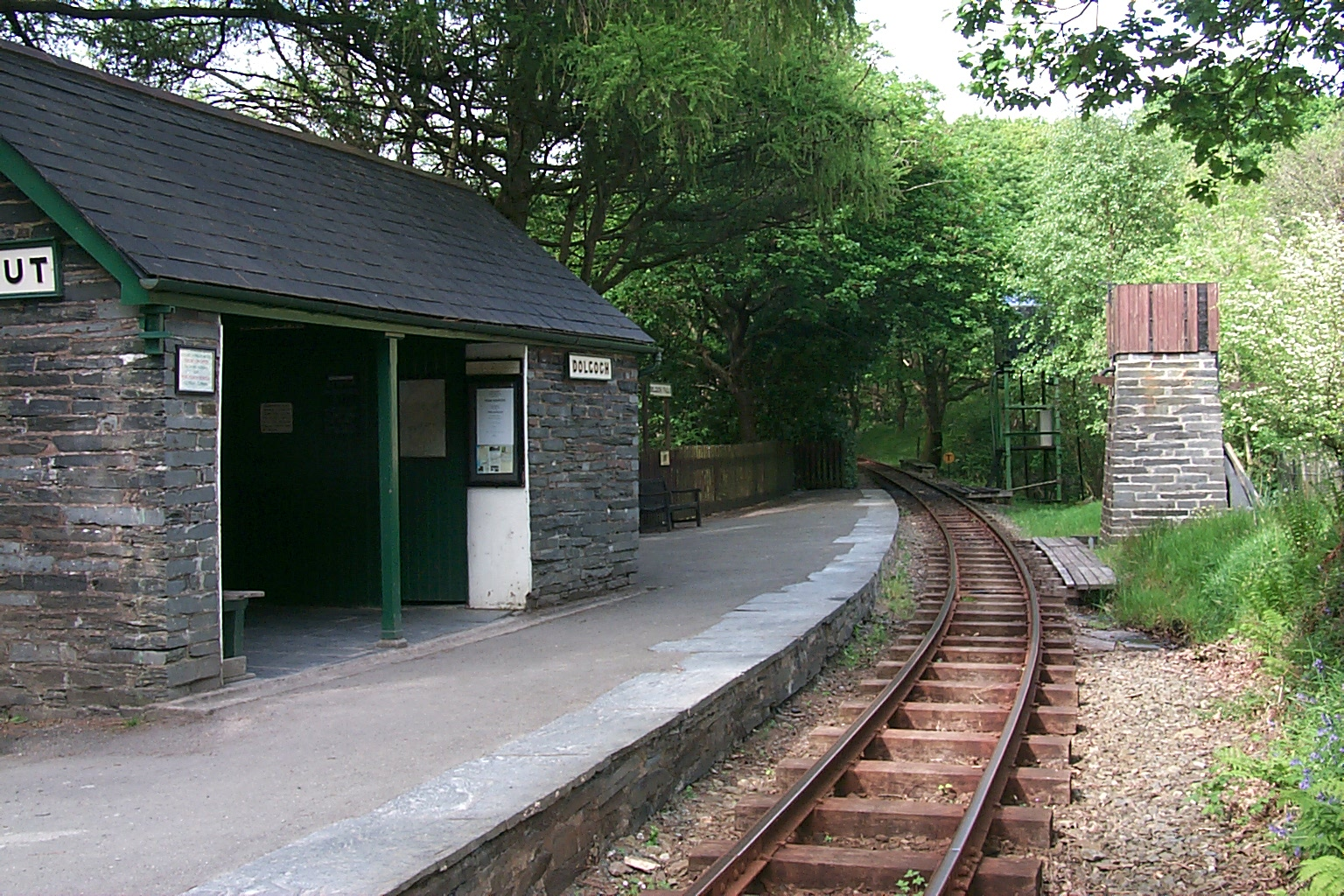
- Dolgoch station, looking east

General information
- Location: Bryncrug, Gwynedd; Wales
- Coordinates: 52.622005°N 3.993982°W
- Grid reference: SH650045
- System: Talyllyn Railway
- Operator: Talyllyn Railway Preservation Society
- Platforms: 1

History
- Original company: Talyllyn Railway Company

Key dates
- c.1867: Opened
- 1951: Operation taken over by Talyllyn Railway Preservation Society
Location

Dolgoch railway station (also known as Dol-goch railway station, Dol-gôch railway station, or Dolgoch Falls railway station) is a station on the Talyllyn Railway between Tywyn and Abergynolwyn, Gwynedd in north-Wales. It is 4 miles 72 chains (4.90 miles, 7.89 km) from Tywyn Wharf. Unlike most places on the line, the station was built for tourist traffic, for visitors to the local Dolgoch Falls.

To the west of the station, there is three-span brick viaduct that carries the railway over the Dolgoch Ravine. This is the largest engineering structure on the railway; it is 52 feet (16 m) high. It is also a grade II listed structure. The railway passes through rock cuttings either side of the viaduct.

This is an important stopping point, despite the lack of significant passenger facilities, because all steam trains take water here on the "up" (eastwards) journey, from one of the two "up" tanks; it is important on the "down" (westwards) journey because all passengers have their tickets checked here on the down journey.

There are three water towers in total at the station; two at the east end of the station for up trains, and one at the west end for down trains. The original water tower is the western of the up towers.

The name 'Dol-gôch' means 'Red-meadow'. It was taken from the nearby stream, the Nant Dolgoch (known at the time as the Nant Dol-gôch).

== History ==
=== Pre-preservation ===
When the line was built in 1865, a water tower was provided, built of slate blocks from the Bryn-Eglwys Quarry, with a wooden tank.

The passenger station was open by August 1867 (when it was listed in Bradshaw's Guide), and a station building and small platform were provided for passengers. Both were built out of slate blocks, and the platform had a surface of slate chippings, edged with slate slabs (this slate was from the Bryn-Eglwys Quarry, brought to the site by rail).

The station did not appear in Bradshaw's Guide from November 1867 until July 1872 (the same time as Brynglas station was opened), which has misled many sources to quote 1872 as its opening date.

Some slate quarrying was carried out at the nearby Dolgoch quarry during the early years of the railway, and it is believed that a siding was provided here for them. Prospecting for the quarry started in January 1868, however it was not until January 1877 that a quarry opened in the ravine. This quarry appears to have been initially successful, however a major storm in August 1880 brought the quarry into a terminal decline and it closed in April 1884.

=== Post-Preservation ===
In 1958, a footbridge was built over the railway immediately west of the station, to provide more direct access to the Dolgoch Falls.

In 1961, the platform was extended in both directions to accommodate longer trains. A new steel water tower was added at the east end of the new platform, and is now the main tower for up trains. The original water tower has since been reconditioned and is used occasionally. The platform extensions are of a similar construction as the original platform; the only difference in their construction is that the slate used on the extensions was not from the Bryneglwys quarry. The platform surface of the entire platform, including the extensions, was changed during the construction of the platform extensions; the platform now has a tarmac surface (the slate slab edging was not changed). In 1987, the platform was widened, and the surface renewed again. In the 2000s, a further steel water tower was built at the west end of the platform, which is used by some down trains.

Around 2010, a toilet block was added to the station, just to the west of the station building.

== In popular culture ==
In The Railway Series by Rev. Wilbert Awdry, and in the fourth season of Thomas & Friends, Rheneas station on the Skarloey Railway is based on this station.

== Gallery ==
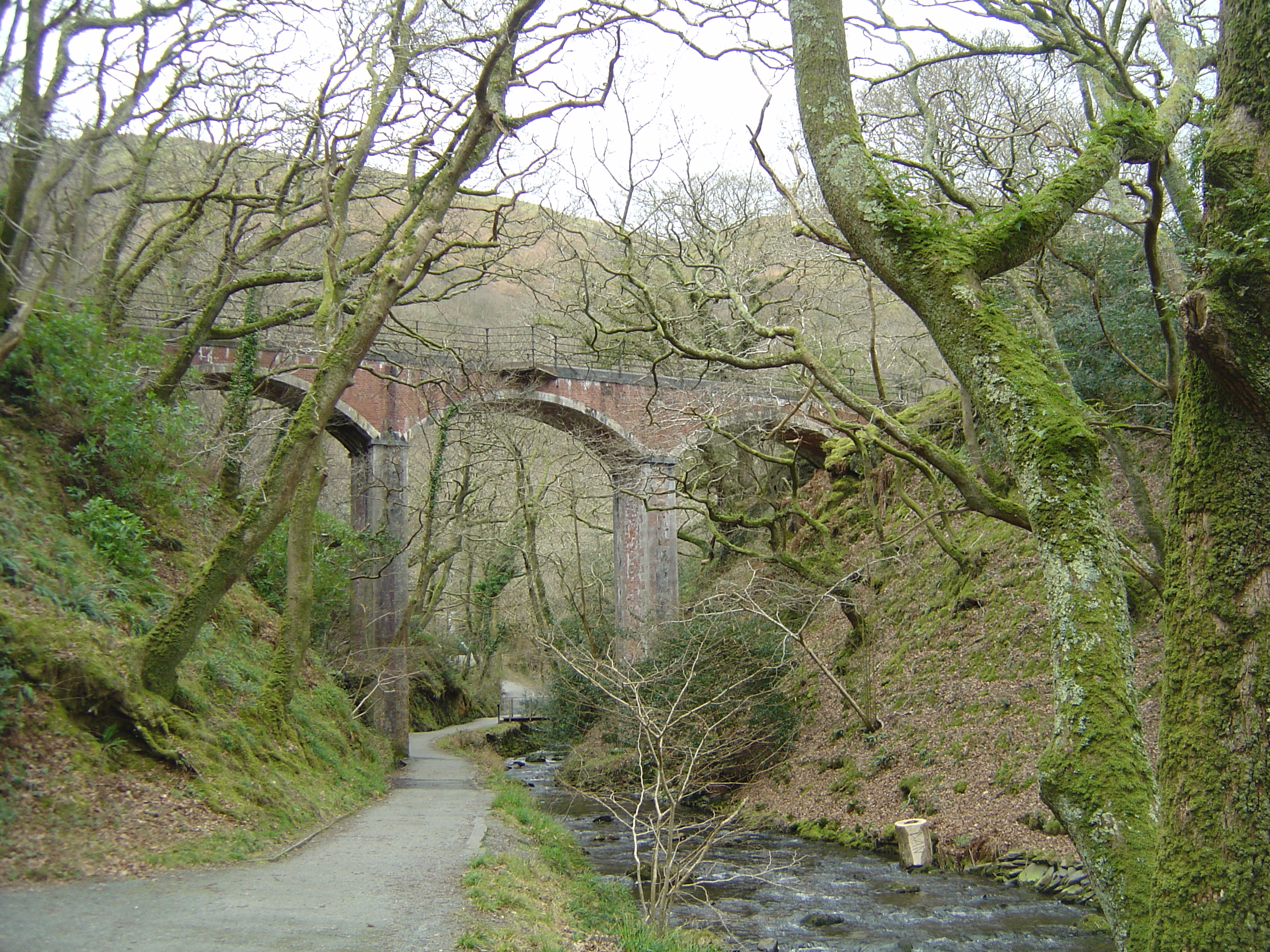
Dolgoch viaduct, 18 March 2008.

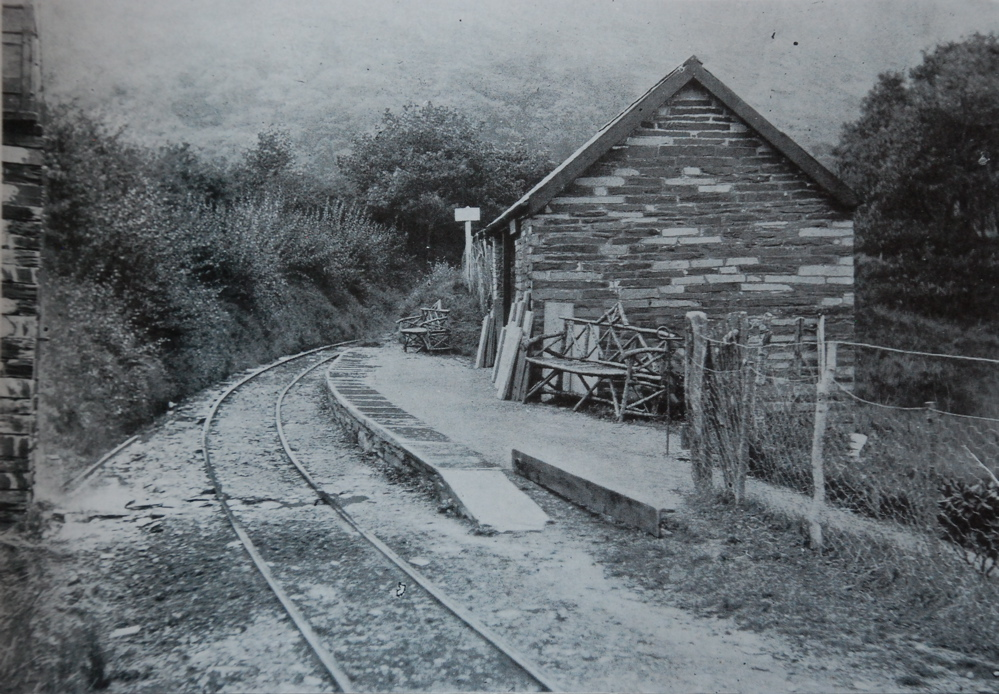
Dolgoch Station in original condition, looking west, in 1894.

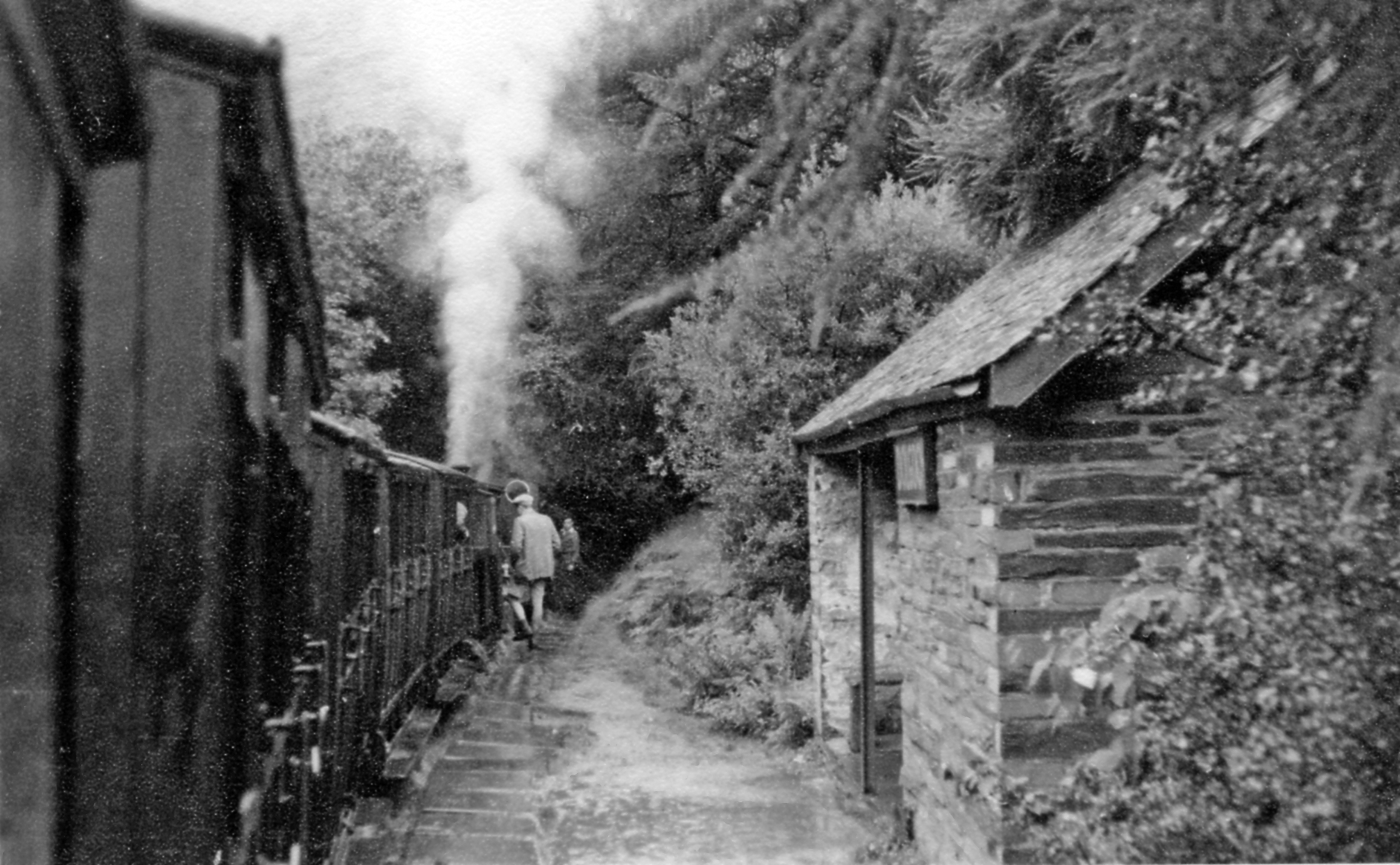
Dolgoch Station, still in original condition, looking west. 3 August 1951.

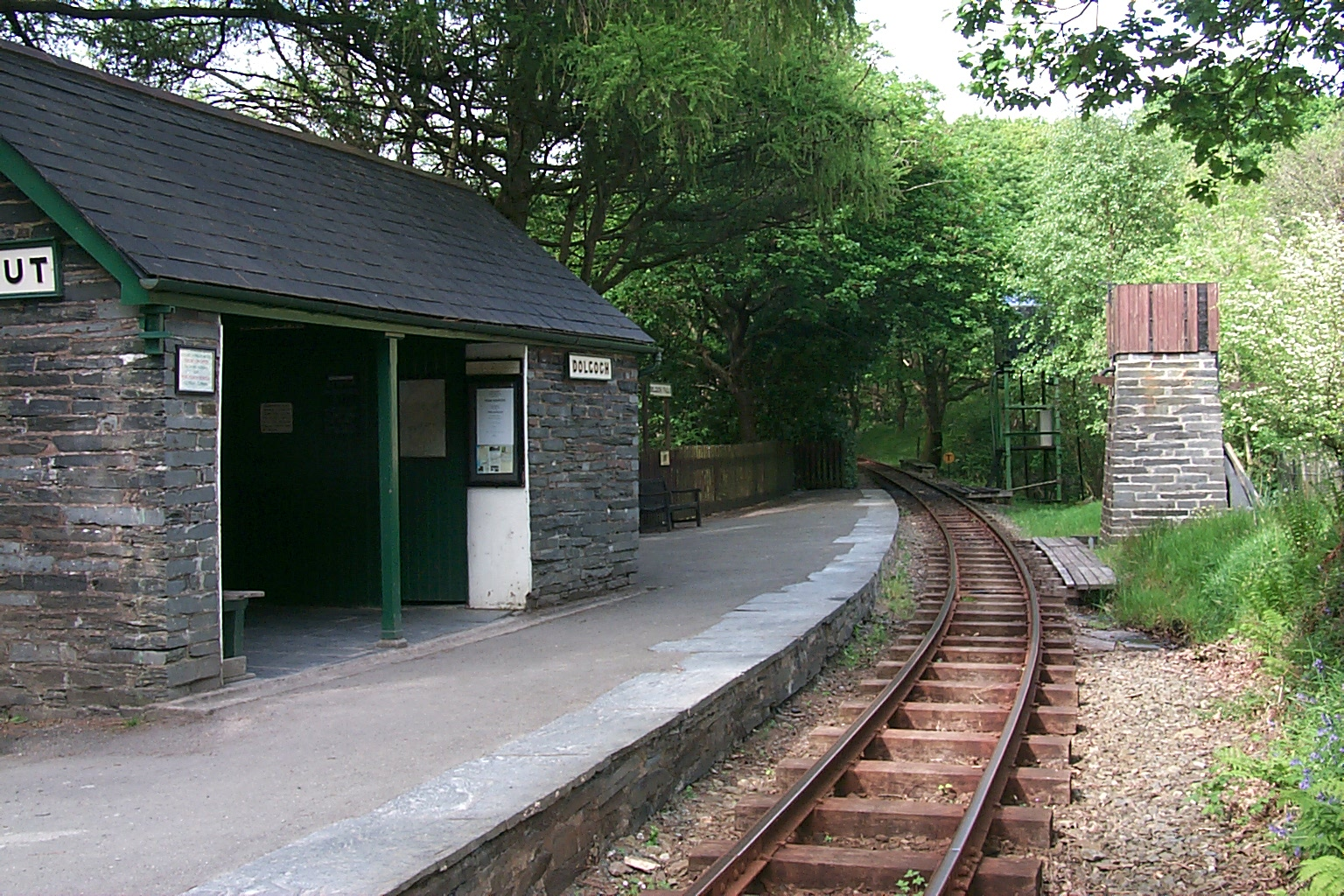
Dolgoch station, looking east, 13 May 1999.
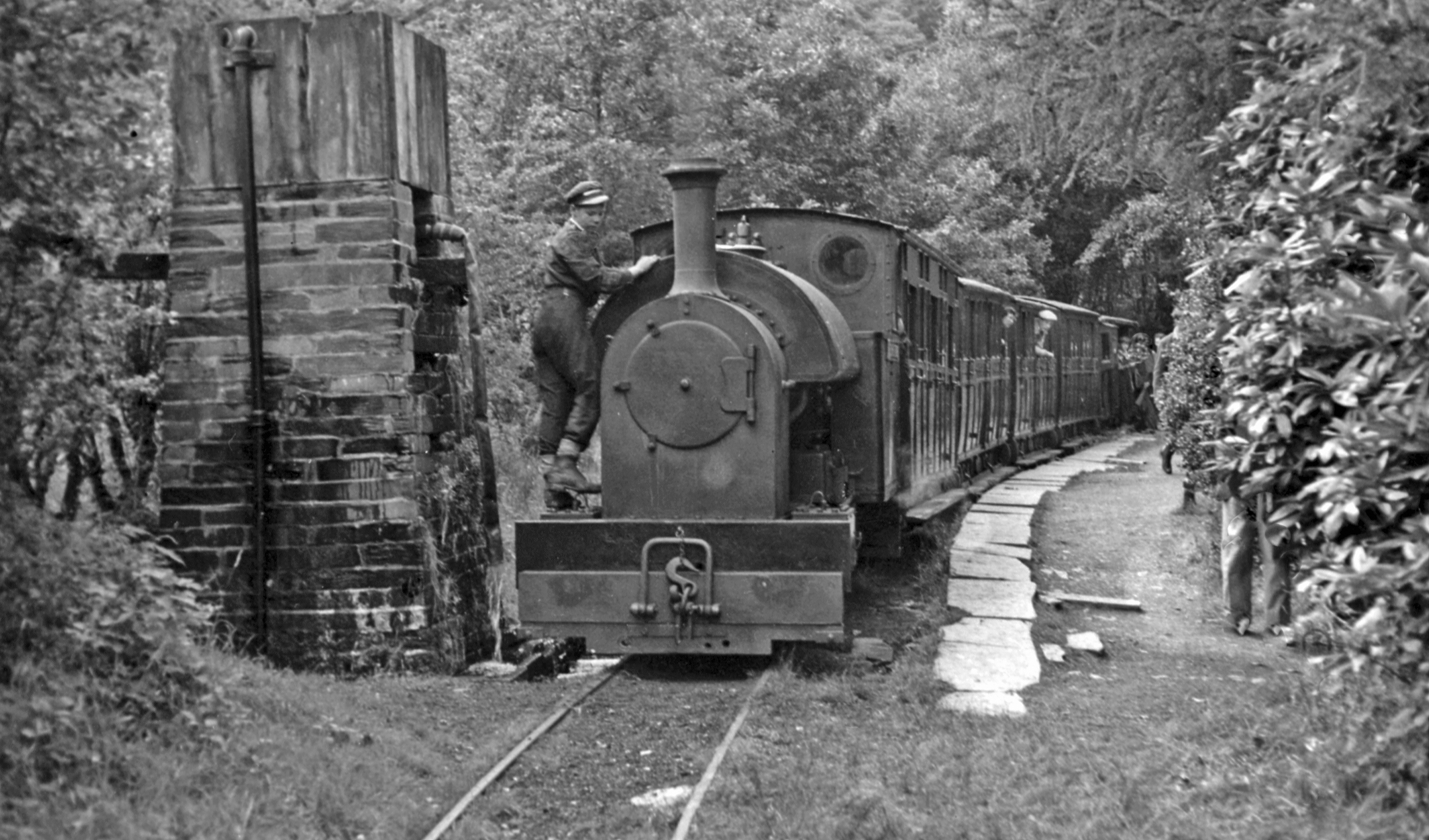
The original water tower at Dolgoch, 4 August 1952.

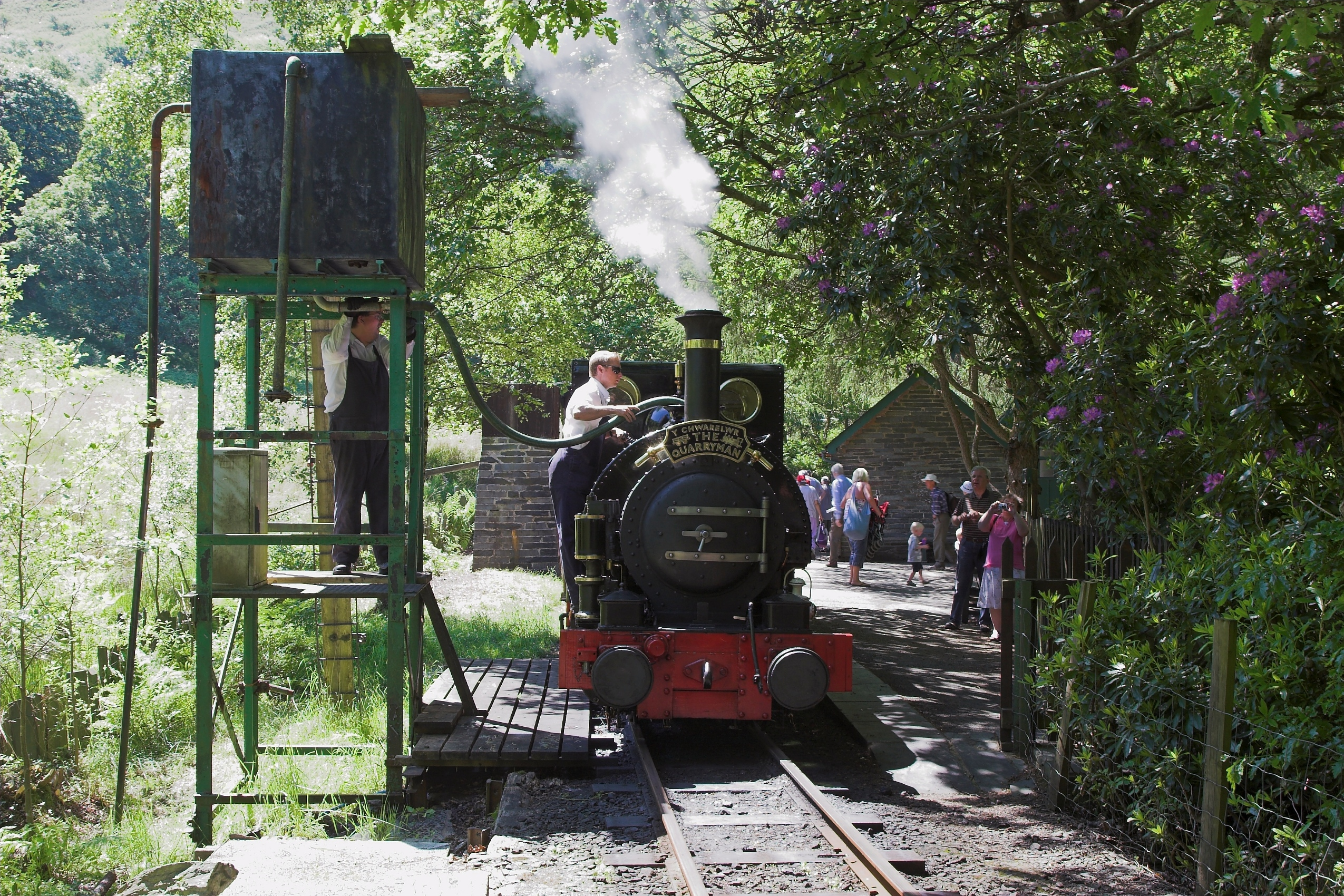
The 1961-built water tower at Dolgoch, 1 June 2009.

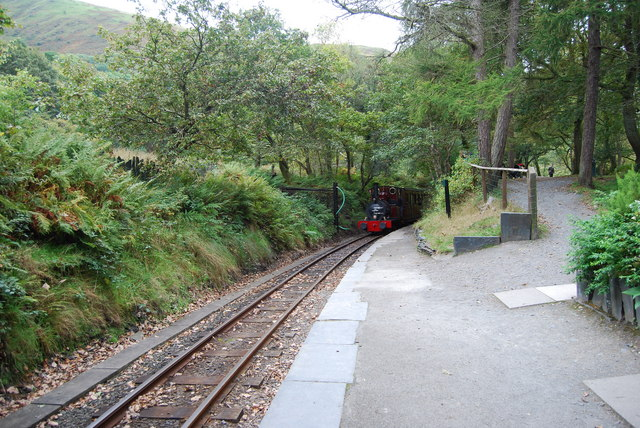
The western platform extension; the newest water tower is visible, beside the locomotive, in the distance. 26 September 2009.

Preceding station	Heritage railways	Following station
Brynglas towards Tywyn Wharf	Talyllyn Railway	Quarry Siding towards Nant Gwernol
