= Dolgoch =

Dolgoch can refer to:

- Dolgoch railway station, a station on the preserved Talyllyn Railway, Wales
- Dolgoch (locomotive), a preserved steam locomotive on the Talyllyn Railway
- Dolgoch Falls, a series of waterfalls near Tywyn in Mid Wales
- Dolgoch quarry, Gwynedd, a former slate quarry in Mid Wales
