= Brynglas railway station =

Railway station in Wales

Brynglas
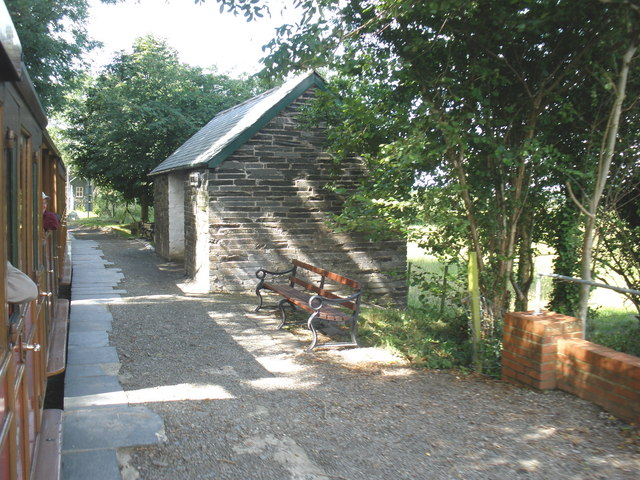
- Brynglas Station, looking west

General information
- Location: Bryncrug, Gwynedd; Wales
- Coordinates: 52.608389°N 4.027047°W
- Grid reference: SH628030
- System: Station on heritage railway
- Operator: Talyllyn Railway Preservation Society
- Platforms: 1

History
- Original company: Talyllyn Railway Company

Key dates
- July 1872: Opened
- 1951: Operation taken over by Talyllyn Railway Preservation Society
Location

Brynglas railway station (also known as Bryn-glas railway station) is a request stop on the Talyllyn Railway, serving the hamlet of Pandy near Bryn-crug, in Gwynedd, Mid-Wales. It is 3.17 miles (5.10 km) from Tywyn Wharf. A station building and platform are provided on the north side of the track, as the railway's carriages have been modified to have doors only on this side for safety reasons. The station building is a Grade II listed structure.

The name 'Brynglas' was taken from a local farm, and means 'Blue hill'.

There are level crossings on both sides of the station: one to the east, for a farm track, and on to the west, for the public road to Pandy. The road crossing was originally a brick arch bridge, which now serves as a cattle creep. There is also a bridge over the Afon Cwm-Pandy.

The station was originally situated between the two bridges, but the platform has since been extended in both directions such that it now stretches between both level crossings. The river bridge was rebuilt to carry the extended platform.

== History ==
=== Pre-preservation ===
==== Before the station ====
When the Talyllyn Railway was built in 1865, there was no station at Brynglas. The site of the station was on a smooth curve, which had two brick arch underbridges in it, crossing the road to Pandy and the Afon Cwm-Pandy river. The road bridge had a headroom of only 6 feet (1.8 m), and was replaced with a level crossing in mid-1866, after a request from local residents in that February. The alignment of the railway was slewed southwards at about the same time, to ease the gradient on the road leading to the (new) level crossing, and because it had brick arches experienced settlement, probably caused by uneven compression of the underlying soil. A new girder bridge was constructed over the road/cattle creep, with cast iron I-beam girders resting on brick abutments, and the river bridge was also replaced.

==== Construction ====
The station was opened in July 1872 (when it first appeared in Bradshaw's Guide), between the two bridges. The station is accessed off the public road, the disused northern arch being used to cross the cattle creep (former road bridge). A station building and platform, both built out of slate-blocks, being provided for waiting passengers. The platform surface is slate chippings, edged with slate slabs.

==== Slate quarrying ====
A short goods siding was provided on the west side of the western level crossing, for the Cwm-pandy slate quarry, a small slate quarry at 52°36′26.0″N 4°01′27.9″W. The quarry was short-lived, opening in 1877 and closing around 1880.

Despite the quarry's closure, the siding built for it was never removed, and was used for goods to local farms.

=== Post-preservation ===
In 1953, the goods siding was converted into a passing loop. It was extended westwards in 1961. A further siding was laid on the south side of the loop in 1975, for wagon storage. The points for the loop and siding are controlled by a six-lever ground frame by the level crossing, which was covered in the 1960s, for the comfort of blockmen. The cabin also contains the electric key token equipment to allow trains to pass here, in accordance with the railway's Block Working System.

Around 6 p.m. on 10 June 1993, a heavy, although very localised, thunderstorm in the mountains to the south of Brynglas caused a flash flood down the Cwm Pandy valley, and much debris was deposited on the Pandy hamlet and station. In the passing loop west of the station a hedge was swept away by the flood, and the embankment was severely eroded. The train service was cancelled until the afternoon of 14 June, whilst the track-work was cleared of debris. The embankment was not fully repaired until 3 July.

The platform was extended in the 1990s, which entailed rebuilding the river bridge to carry the platform (the cattle creep was crossed by the existing brick arch).

The block-cabin to the west of the station was modified around 2010, by having the southern (track-facing) wall moved northwards.

In November 2007, the level crossing to the west of the station (over the public road to Pandy) was replaced. A timber surface was provided.

In February 2010, The farm crossing to the east of the station was replaced, the new crossing being built out of concrete.

The road crossing to the west of the station was again replaced in November 2019, at the same time as the adjacent cattle creep's deck. This was because cattle creep's main girders had been found to be severely rusted, and were made of cast iron. A new bridge, made of concrete with steel girders, and a new road crossing, made of concrete, were both provided.

== In fiction ==
In The Railway Series by Rev. Wilbert Awdry, Glennock station on the Skarloey Railway was partly based on this station.

== Gallery ==
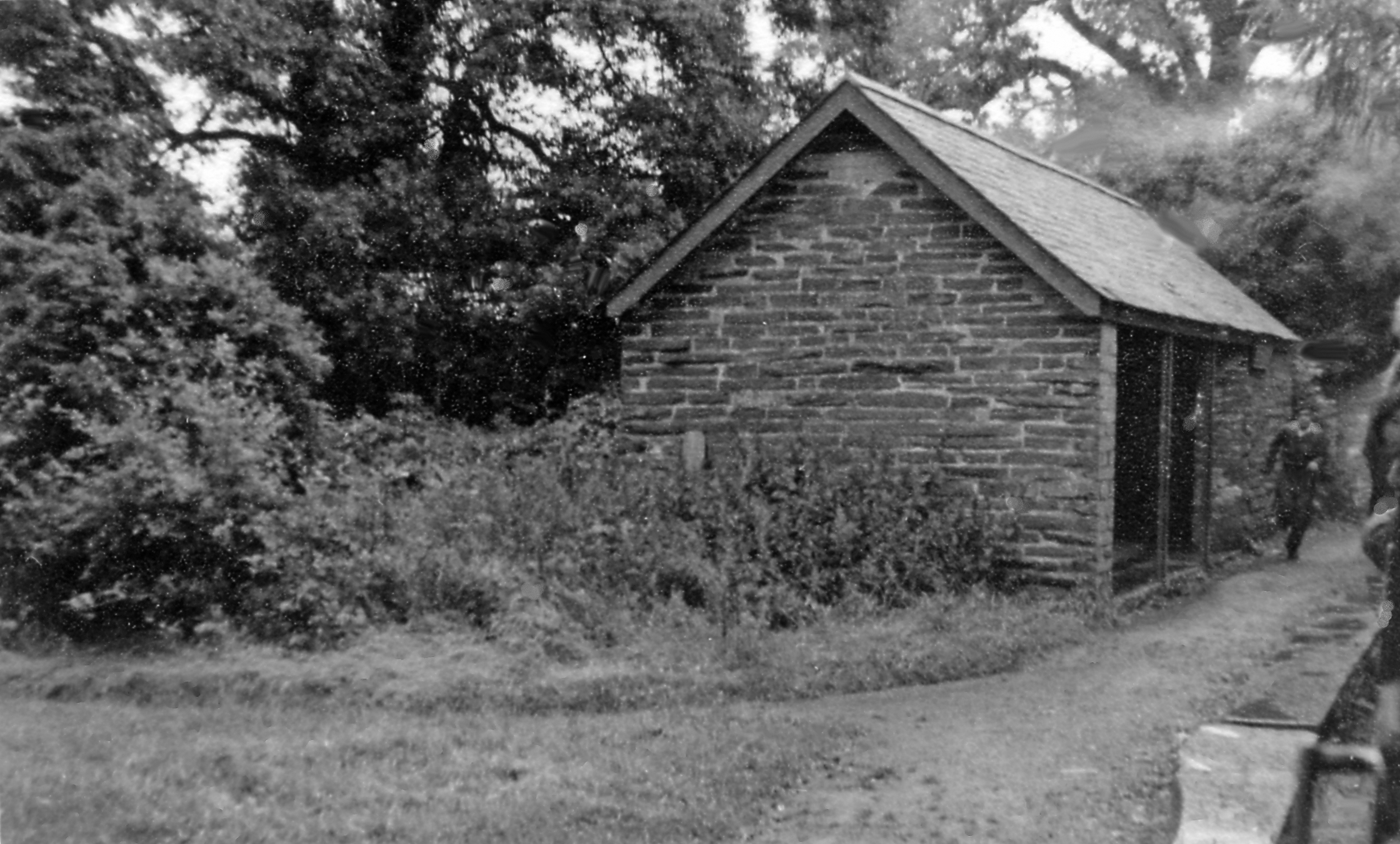
Brynglas Station, looking east. 3 August 1951.

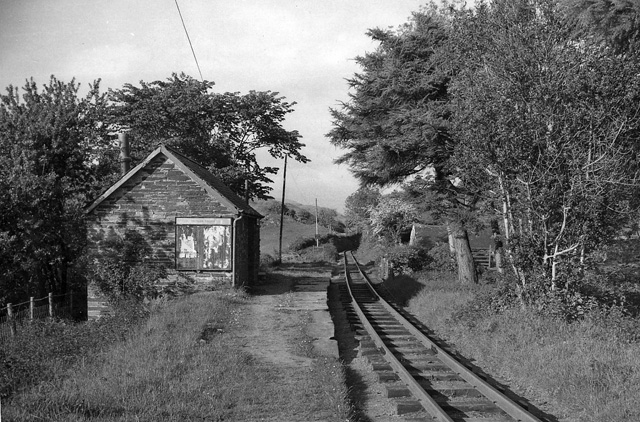
Brynglas station, looking east. 2 June 1962.

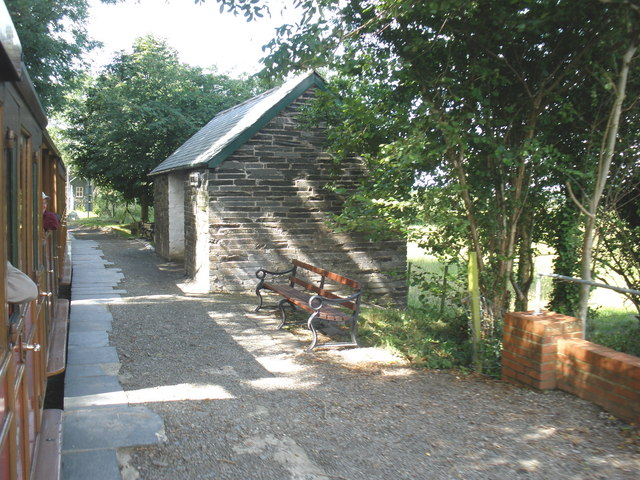
Brynglas Station, looking west. 18 July 2009.

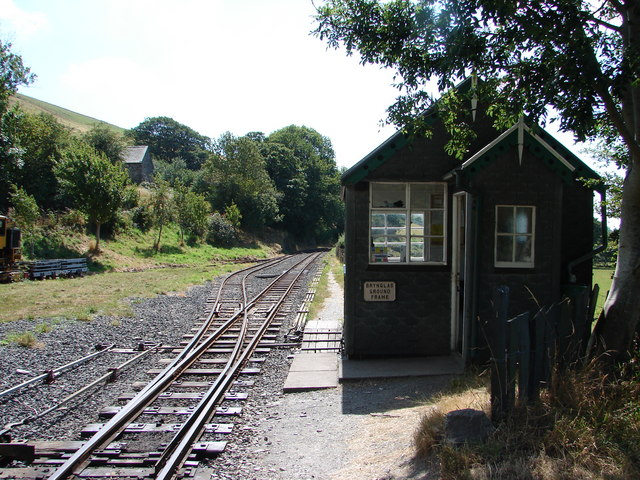
Modern view of the passing loop at Brynglas, looking west. 3 August 2006

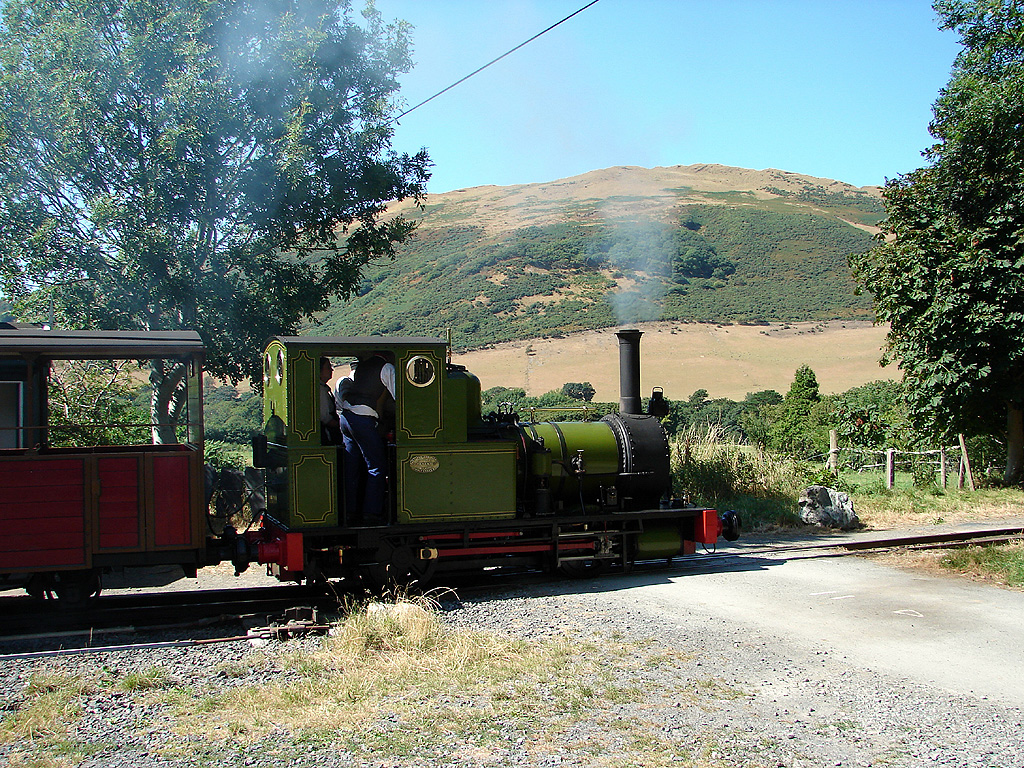
The Western Level Crossing at Brynglas, looking north. 3 August 2006

Preceding station	Heritage railways	Following station
Tynllwynhen towards Tywyn Wharf	Talyllyn Railway	Dolgoch towards Nant Gwernol
