= Pendre railway station =

Railway station in Tywyn, UK

Pendre
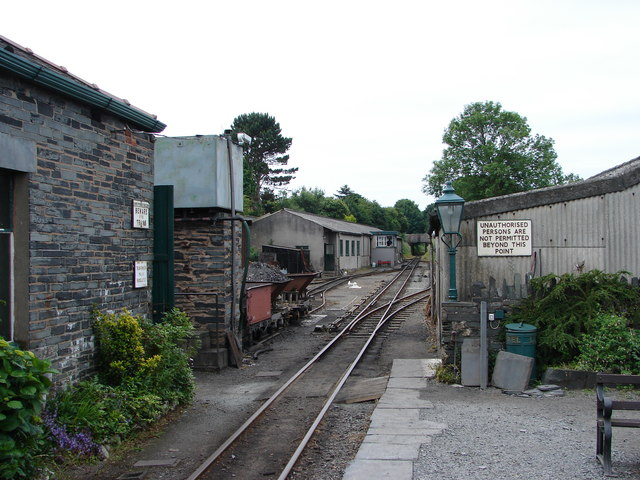
- Pendre station and works, looking west

General information
- Location: Tywyn, Gwynedd; Wales
- Coordinates: 52.587222°N 4.081111°W
- Grid reference: SH590008
- System: Station on heritage railway
- Owner: Talyllyn Railway
- Manager: Talyllyn Railway
- Platforms: 1

Key dates
- 1866: Opened
- 1951: taken over by Talyllyn Railway Preservation Society
Location

Pendre railway station (also known as Tywyn Pendre railway station, or formerly as Towyn Pendre railway station) is a station on the Talyllyn Railway in Tywyn, Gwynedd in mid-Wales. It is 0.42 miles (0.68 km) from Tywyn Wharf, which is the primary station and western terminus of the railway. Pendre is the site of the railway's locomotive and carriage sheds, and engineering works. Passenger trains stop at Pendre by request only.

'Pendre' is Welsh for 'End-of-town'.

== History ==
=== Pre-preservation ===
==== Construction ====
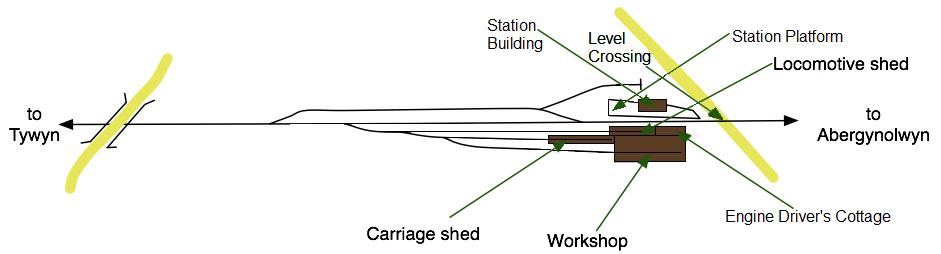
Layout of Pendre, around 1900

The wooden station building was ready for the opening of the line in November/December 1866. Building work for the workshops and sheds on this site started as soon as the railway was open to transport building materials to the site. The first buildings were completed by February 1867. The buildings consisted of an engine shed with an attached cottage on the east end, for the engine-driver (the cottage was later occupied by the crossing-keeper), an adjoining workshop, the combined length of both of these buildings, to the south; and a single road carriage shed (now known as the "south carriage shed"). All these buildings (apart from the carriage shed, which was built of timber) were built out of slate blocks, and all had slate roofs (this slate was from the Bryn-Eglwys quarry).

==== Operation ====
From February 1867, Pendre was the passenger terminus at Tywyn. By 1877, passengers were being carried from Tywyn Wharf, though these trains were not advertised until 1909 and didn't appear on timetables until 1912.

Wharf station did not have a run-round loop until 1952, so the locomotive propelled its empty carriages back to Pendre after their last train of the day. This operation continues even after the installation of the loop at Wharf, as the carriage sheds all have western entrances.

=== Post-preservation ===
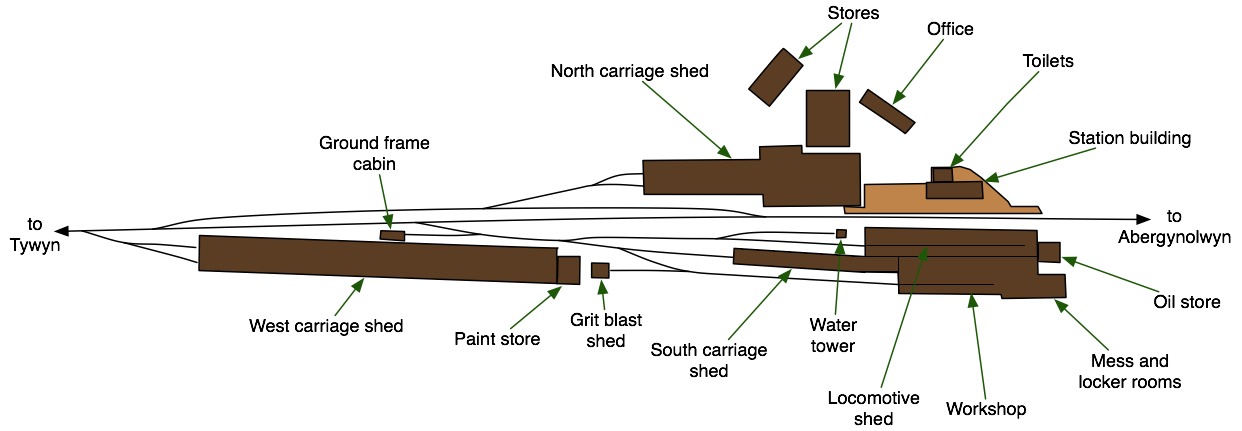
Layout of Pendre, 1999

In 1959, construction started on a 2-road carriage shed on the site of a former hay barn. This also had an attached building which houses a Joinery, admin, engineering stores, electrical stores, automatic telephone exchange, and offices. This work was completed in 1963, and is known as the "North Carriage Shed". In 1962, the south carriage shed was rebuilt with steel frames. The loop was extended in the winter of 1967/1968. In 1968, the cottage to the east end of the engine shed became unoccupied, so the engine shed was extended into the cottage.

In 1972, work commenced on a 2-road carriage-shed (known as the "west carriage shed") and paint-shop at the west end of the site, which has since been extended to 160 feet (49 m), and can accommodate ten of the railway's bogie carriages. A covered block-post was built at the same time, which controls the points in the yard, contains a 15-lever ground frame for controlling the pointwork in the yard, and also contains electric key token machines for the railway's block working system.

The final major change at Pendre came in late 1983, when the gated level crossing – which is just to the east of the station – was widened and provided with new gates. The old gates are now in the children's playground at Abergynolwyn.

In 2018, the society decided to launch a project to provide additional workshop and carriage shed facilities at Pendre. In 2019, the railway purchased a large area of land opposite the west carriage shed - known as "The Orchard" - as part of this project .

== Gallery ==
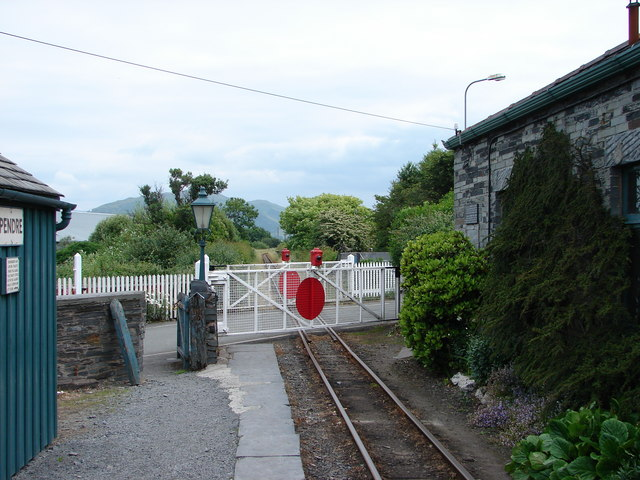
Pendre level crossing

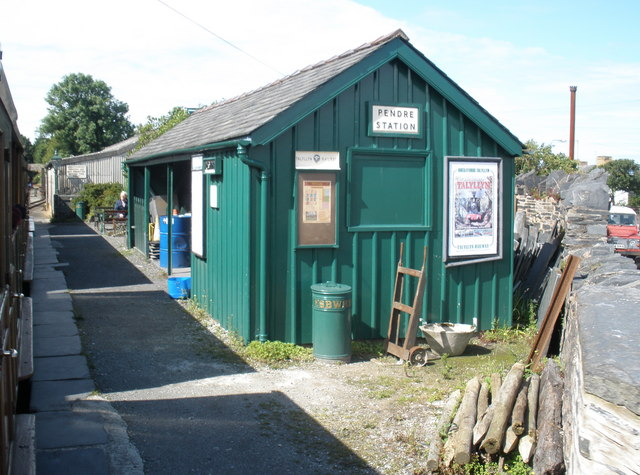
Pendre station building, taken from the east end of the platform, looking west

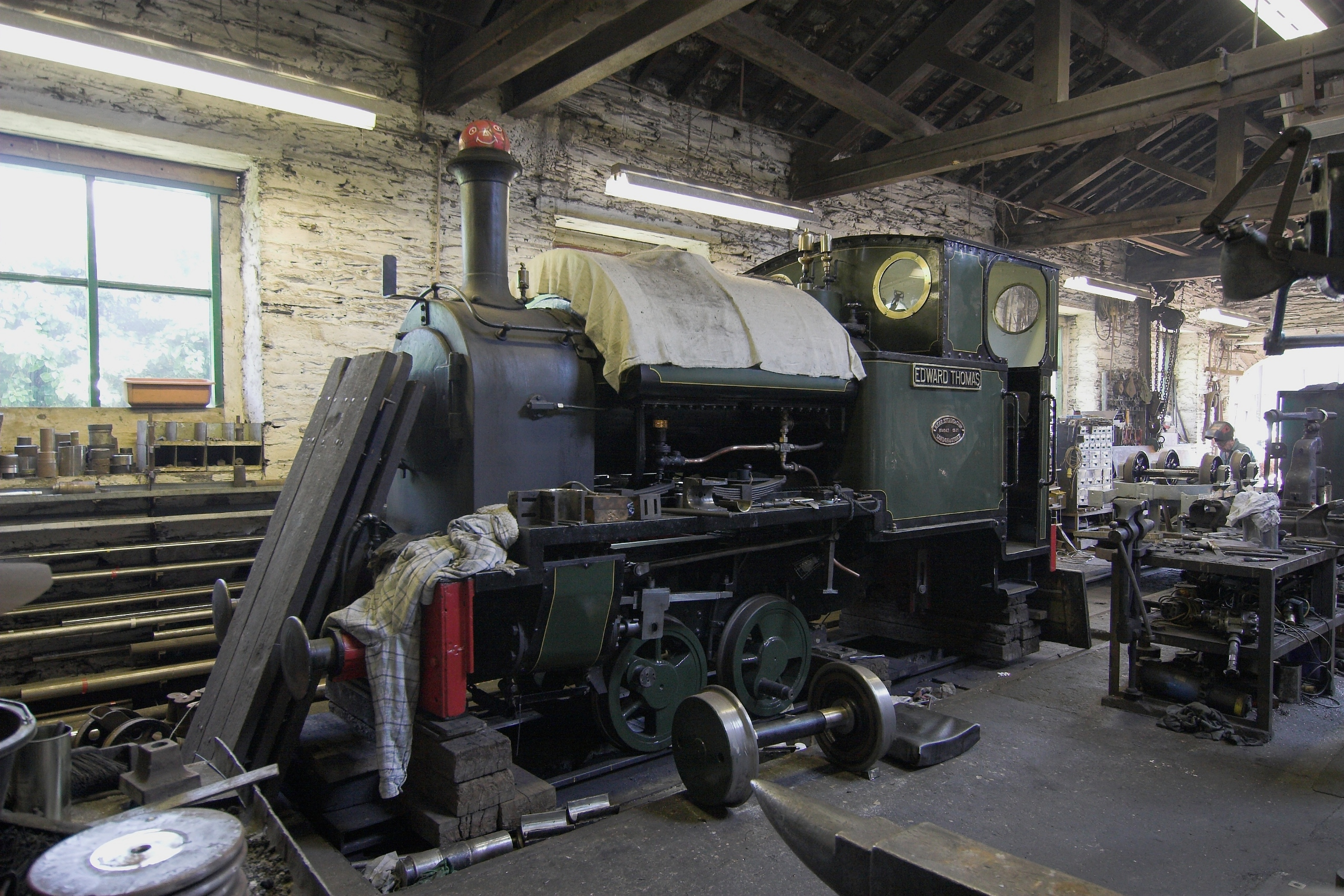
No. 4 Edward Thomas inside Pendre workshops

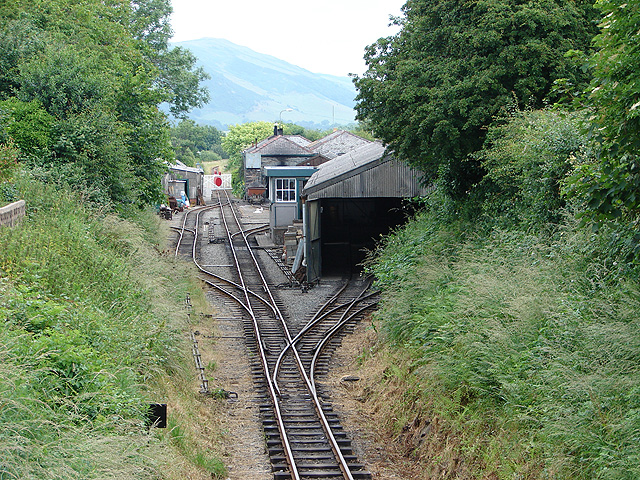
A modern view of the site from the west

== In popular culture ==
The works here are featured in The Railway Series by Rev. Wilbert Awdry, and in the fourth season of Thomas & Friends, as the works at Crovan's Gate, on the Skarloey Railway.

Preceding station	Heritage railways	Following station
Tywyn Wharf Terminus	Talyllyn Railway	Hendy towards Nant Gwernol
