= Skarloey =

Skarloey may refer to:

- Skarloey (locomotive), fictional tank engine in The Railway Series books
- Skarloey (fictional station), in The Railway Series books
- Skarloey Railway, in The Railway Series books
