= Dolgoch quarry, Gwynedd =

Disused slate quarry in Mid Wales

Dolgoch
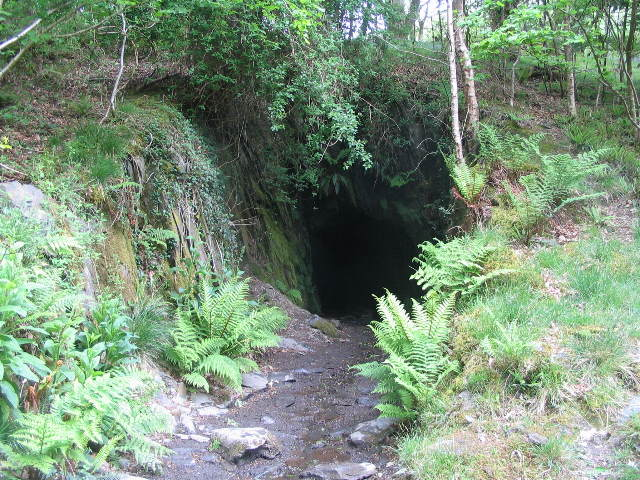
- One of the remains of the quarry's workings in 2009

- Location in Gwynedd
- Location: near Abergynolwyn, Merioneth (now Gwynedd), Wales, UK; 52°37′12.5″N 3°59′39.3″W SH 65013 04392
- Products: Slate
- Type: Quarry
- Discovered: January 1868
- Opened: January 1877
- Closed: April 1884

Dolgoch slate quarry (also spelt Dol-goch slate quarry or Dôl-goch slate quarry) was a slate quarry in Mid Wales, approximately halfway between Bryn-crug and Abergynolwyn (4 miles (6.4 km) away from each of them). The quarry was named after a nearby stream, the Nant Dôl-goch. 'Dôl goch' is Welsh for 'red meadow'.

The slate at Dolgoch is described as silver-grey in colour; this is very similar to the slate from Bryn Eglwys quarry and the quarries around Corris.

Although the quarry had favourable transportation arrangements compared to many quarries in the area, it was never worked on a significant scale, and was short-lived – opening in 1877 and closing in 1884.

== History ==
=== W. W. Jones ===
In early January 1868, William Williams Jones (c.1826–1903) leased land in Dôl-goch ravine and started trying to establish a quarry. He was a local prospector and shopkeeper who ran a draper's business at Brân House (now Geufron House) on Corbett Square in Tywyn. He was also a poet who used the bardic name 'Gwilym o Fôn'. He opened many mines in the area but, with the exception of the Tonfanau stone quarry, most of them were unsuccessful.

=== Dolgoch Slate and Slab Co. Ltd. ===
In April 1872, Jones gave up his lease to the Dolgoch Slate and Slab Company Limited. This newly formed company intended to raise £30,000 (equivalent to £2,930,000 in 2025) to build a quarry here. The landowner, Athelstan John Soden Corbet, agreed a lease for the Dolgoch Slate and Slab Co. Ltd. This allowed them to quarry slate here for 40 years, from 25 March 1872, for a rent of £30 per annum (equivalent to £2,930 per annum in 2025). At the time, Athelstan Corbet was in considerable debt, and hoped that the Dolgoch quarry would pay this off. However, the new company did not actually open a quarry in the ravine for many years, due to financial restrictions.

In November 1875, a quarry opened.

In January 1877, the ownership of the quarry was transferred to the Dolgoch Slate and Slab Co. Ltd., which further developed the quarry. Around the same time, the Cwm-Pandy quarry also opened, 1.6 miles (2.6 km) south-west of Dolgoch; many sources speculate that the openings of these quarries were related, although no evidence has been found to support these claims. A year later, Athelstan Corbet's estate was auctioned, as he had been unable to pay his debts. The Dolgoch farm, on which the quarry lies, was sold to Edward Lyon, of Scrigford, Staffordshire.

The Dolgoch quarry appears to have been successful, and in June 1880 was significant enough that the government's Chief Mines Inspector for North Wales added the quarry to the surrounding district.

In August 1880, a major storm caused significant damage to the quarry. The quarry never recovered, and closed in April 1884.

=== Revival attempts ===
In 1897, the newly formed Dolgoch Slate Limited tried to secure a 25-year lease for the land occupied by the quarry on 2 August 1897. The company intended to raise £20,000 (equivalent to £2,250,000 in 2025) to revive the quarry. The land occupied by the quarry was then owned by Robert Jones Roberts (1843–1902), a chemist from Tywyn, and rented to John Price. Roberts did not agree on the lease, so the revival attempt was abandoned.

Quarrying in the ravine was prohibited from 1902 onwards, under the terms of the sale of the ravine from Robert Jones Roberts to the Tywyn Urban District Council.

However, this did not stop two further revival attempts, both by workers from the Bryn Eglwys quarry. The first was in 1910, because of the closure of Bryn Eglwys between December 1909 and 1911. A final attempt was made to revive the quarry for a brief period in 1921, when there was a dispute between Sir Henry Haydn Jones, the manager and owner of Bryn Eglwys quarry, and a group of quarry workers. Both attempts were unsuccessful.

== Geology ==
Three parallel veins of Ordovician slate run through mid Wales, from the region north of Dinas Mawddwy through Corris and south west towards Tywyn: the Broad Vein; the Red Vein or Middle Vein (sometimes considered to be part of the Broad Vein); and the Narrow Vein. These veins are the southern edge of the Harlech Dome anticline which surfaces in the north at Blaenau Ffestiniog. The Dolgoch quarry worked the Broad Vein and the Narrow Vein; these are the same two veins that were more successfully worked at the Bryn-Eglwys quarry around 2 1/2 miles (4.0 km) west.

The widest of these veins is the 600 feet (180 m) thick Broad Vein that lies to the north of the site and consists of layers of hard, grey shale with patches of slate. The Broad Vein slate is hard and durable, but does not split into thin sections, so is generally unsuitable for use as roofing slates.

The Middle Vein (also known as the Red Vein) lies about 100 yards (91 m) south of the Broad Vein. It is about 60 feet (18 m) thick but contains low-quality, friable slate that contains a large number of fossils, predominately graptolites. This vein was not worked commercially at Dolgoch. The British Geological Survey now considers the Middle Vein to be a part of the Broad Vein, not a separate formation.

The third vein is the Narrow Vein which lies about 100 yards south of the Middle Vein and is also about 60 feet (18 m) thick. It contains the highest quality slate of the three veins and the most commercially valuable, being easy to split into roofing slates and slabs and both durable and strong. The vein is mostly a continuous bed of slate, containing only the occasional seam of quartz. However the quality of the rock varies over the depth of the vein; the best material is found nearest the surface.

== Description ==
There are four adits at Dolgoch; they are located between SH652044 and SH655043.

Adit 1 is located close to the Lower Dolgoch Falls. It is approximately 100 feet (30 m) long and dog-legs to the right slightly, ending at a chamber that is open to the sky, but fenced off for safety.

The other three adits are on the level above the Lower Falls, and along the walkway to the Middle Dolgoch Falls.

Adit 2 is very wet for most of its length, although it gets drier towards the end. It is approximately 314 feet (96 m) long and bends towards the left slightly as you go in.

Adit 3 is the shortest, as it is only 52 feet (16 m) long.

Adit 4 is the longest and most complexly-shaped. It twists and turns mostly to the left until, approximately 220 feet (67 m) away from the entrance, it divides into two. The left-hand branch goes approximately 80 feet (24 m) further from the junction. The right-hand branch goes approximately 290 feet (88 m) further after the junction. Part-way along the right-hand branch, about 90 feet from the junction, there is a narrow drive, around 16 feet (4.9 m) long, to the left.

== Transportation ==
Slate from the quarry is believed to have been hand-ported to the nearby Dolgoch station, on the Talyllyn Railway. A siding may have been provided, at the station, for the quarry.
