= Bryn Eglwys quarry =

Disused slate quarry in north Wales

Bryn Eglwys
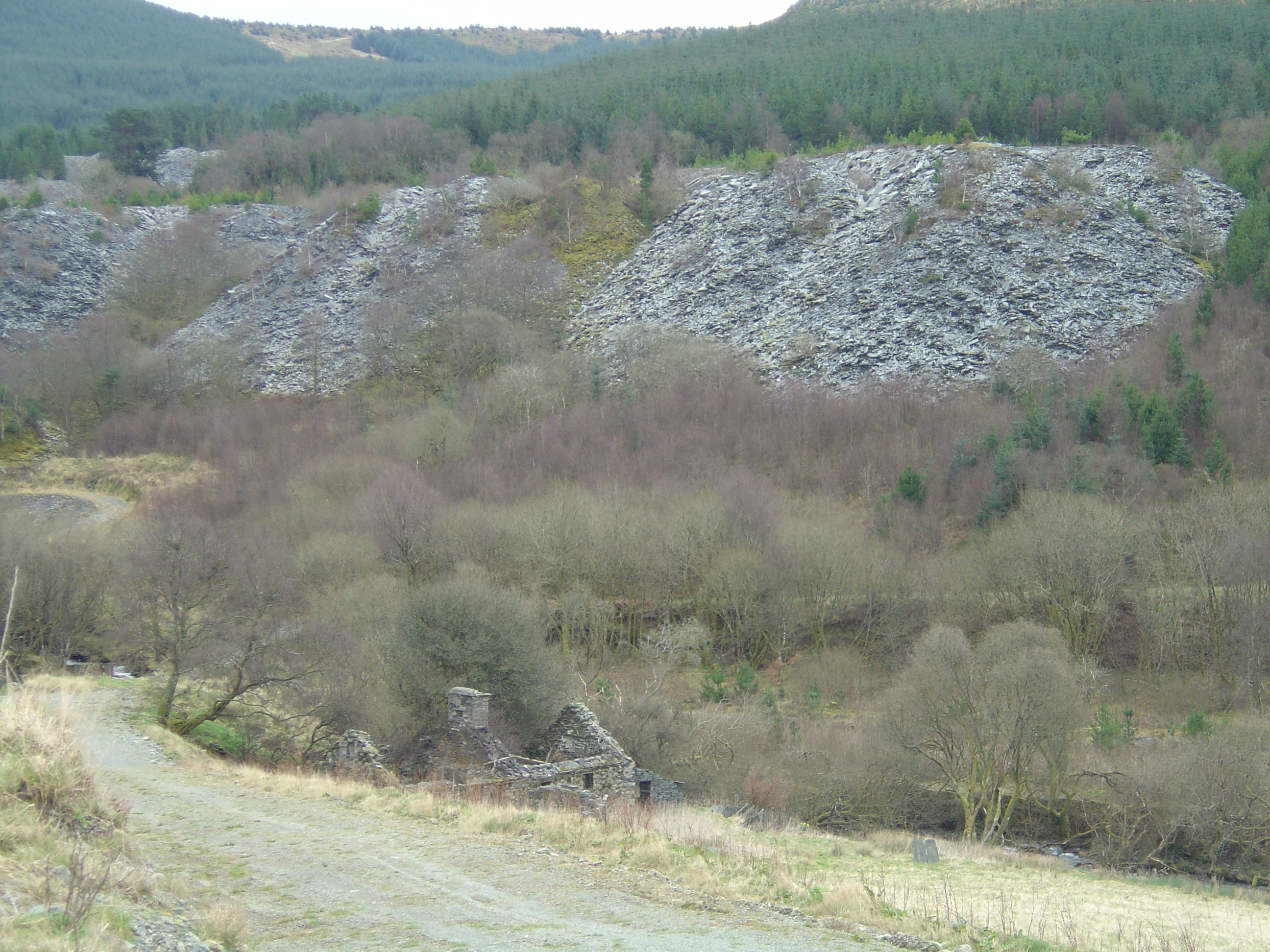
- Spoil heaps at the disused Bryn Eglwys quarry, 2008

- Location in Gwynedd
- Location: near Abergynolwyn, Merioneth (now Gwynedd), Wales, UK; 52°38′0″N 3°55′53″W SH 693 057
- Products: Slate
- Type: Quarry
- Opened: 1847
- Active: 1847-1909, 1911-1946
- Closed: 1946

UNESCO World Heritage Site
- Part of: The Slate Landscape of Northwest Wales
- Criteria: Cultural: ii, iv
- Reference: 1633-006
- Inscription: 2021 (44th Session)

Bryn Eglwys quarry was a slate quarry and mine near Abergynolwyn, in Merionethshire (now part of Gwynedd), Wales. More than 300 men worked at the site, making it the principal employer in the area. Two veins of slate, known as the Broad Vein and the Narrow Vein, were worked. The geology continues eastwards towards Corris and Dinas Mawddwy, and westwards towards Tywyn. It was one of many quarries that worked these veins.

The site, which was in operation for just over 100 years, covered almost 2 sq mi (5 km^{2}). It had several long tunnels up to 250 m (820 ft) to 350 m (1,150 ft). However, since closure all buildings have been demolished. Most of its inclines and infrastructure have become part of forestry plantations.

From 1866 until 1948, the quarry was served by the narrow gauge Talyllyn Railway, which took the slate down to Tywyn for transfer to the main line railway.

== History ==
=== John Pugh ===
In 1844 John Pugh or Pughe obtained a quarrying lease from Lewis Morris, the owner of the Bryneglwys Estate, for a term of 50 years. Pugh was a local miner from Aberdyfi, who already owned other mines in the locality, including the notable Dylife lead mine, which he owned, in association with Hugh Williams, from 1809 until 1858. In 1846 Pugh obtained another lease, for the Cantrybedd land on the opposite side of the valley. Pugh began commercial-scale quarrying in 1847 (this is recorded on a stone plaque in the quarry). He sank a shaft into the Narrow Vein, which is now known as the Daylight Adit, and built a small mill nearby, which he connected to the foot of the shaft by a level. He transported the finished slates by pack horses for onward transport by ship, originally over the mountain ridge to the port of Pennal, and later to the port of Aberdyfi via the Fathew Valley and along the coast.

=== Aberdovey Slate Co. Ltd. ===
In 1863 a group of mill owners from Manchester, led by William McConnel, leased the quarry. Cotton shortages, caused by the American Civil War, had reduced the production of the mills and they were looking for other profitable enterprises. They formed the Aberdovey Slate Company Limited, to operate and manage the quarry, and planned to increase production at Bryn Eglwys. The main barriers to the quarry's expansion at the time were the transportation arrangements for finished slates, and the lack of a workforce near Bryn Eglwys. The new owners overcame the former difficulty by building the Talyllyn Railway, a narrow gauge railway which was designed by James Swinton Spooner. The railway ran from the Cantrybedd incline, which marked the edge of Bryn Eglwys, along the Galltymoelfre Tramway to the Alltwyllt incline, and thence down the Fathew valley to Tywyn, before turning south to reach Aberdyfi. The company built the village of Abergynolwyn to house their workers. In total, the new owners invested around £160,000, equivalent to £17,600,000 in 2025, in developing the quarry, building houses for quarrymen in the village of Abergynolwyn and building the railway from the quarry to Tywyn.

When the Aberystwith and Welsh Coast Railway was opened between Aberdyfi and Tywyn in 1863, the Aberdovey Slate Company decided to terminate their own railway at Tywyn Wharf, a transshipment point to the coastal railway.

The Aberdovey Slate Co. Ltd. was renamed the Abergynolwyn Slate Company Limited in 1867.

=== McConnel era ===
Neither the quarry nor its associated railway were great commercial successes, and by 1879 the company had run out of funds. Both quarry and railway were put up for auction on 9 October 1879. After this and a subsequent auction failed to find a bidder, William McConnel personally bought both. In August 1880 a major storm burst the quarry's reservoir and required major capital to repair. Nevertheless, McConnel re-organised the quarry's finances, and there was then an upturn in the slate market which allowed the quarry to expand further.

McConnel died in 1902 and the quarry became the property of his son, W. H. McConnel. However, the leases on the land occupied by the quarry were close to running out, and the quarry was closed on 18 December 1909; the workers received only one day's notice of the closure. The remaining stocks at the quarry were sent down the railway, and the quarry's machinery began to be dismantled.

=== Henry Haydn Jones (Abergynolwyn Slate & Slab Co. Ltd.) era ===
In 1911 the local Liberal Member of Parliament, Henry Haydn Jones, purchased the quarry for equivalent to £560,131 in 2025, along with the Talyllyn Railway and the village of Abergynolwyn. He formed the Abergynolwyn Slate & Slab Company Limited, to operate the quarry, much like its predecessor, the Aberdovey Slate Company Limited. New leases were signed with the landowners and the quarry resumed production.

Haydn Jones’ leases on the quarry land expired in 1941, but he continued to own and operate the quarry, with an annual tenancy.

The quarry remained in production until a serious collapse on 26 December 1946; it had been unsafe for some time. The stocks were sent to Tywyn by rail, and had all cleared by 1948.

=== After closure ===
Despite the closure of the quarry, Haydn Jones kept a passenger service operating on the railway until his death in 1950. The railway was taken over by a preservation group, becoming the first railway in the world to be operated by volunteers.

Bryn Eglwys was sold to the Forestry Commission, and the surviving quarry buildings were demolished in the early 1980s. Some slates had already been removed from buildings in 1975–1976, and these were used as platform edging for extending the platform at Abergynolwyn. A series of footpaths was created from Nant Gwernol starting from the Alltwylt Incline and along the Galltymoelfre Tramway, though the path diverges from the Cantrybedd Incline due to a missing bridge.

== Geology ==
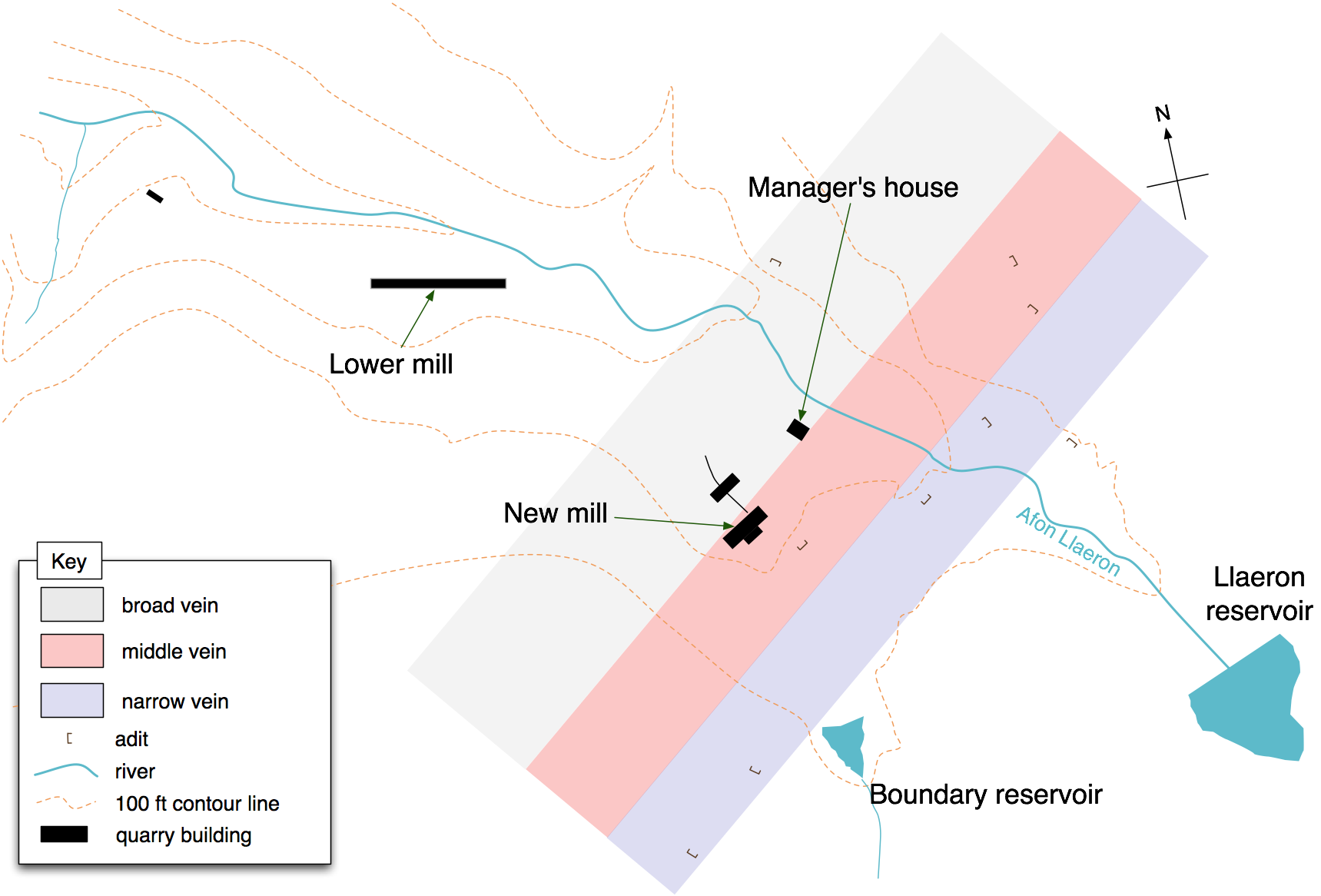
Geology of Bryn Eglwys

Three parallel veins of Ordovician slate run through mid Wales, from the region north of Dinas Mawddwy through Corris and south west towards Tywyn. These veins are the southern edge of the Harlech Dome anticline which surfaces in the north at Blaenau Ffestiniog. Where the veins pass through the site of Bryn Eglwys, they are inclined at an angle of about 30 degrees from the horizontal, sloping downwards to the south-west. The widest of these veins is the 600 feet (180 m) thick Broad Vein that lies to the north of the site and consists of layers of hard, grey shale with patches of slate. The Broad Vein slate is hard and durable, but does not split into thin sections, so is generally unsuitable for use as roofing slates.

The Red Vein (also known as the Middle Vein) lies about 100 yards (91 m) south of the Broad Vein. It is about 60 feet (18 m) thick but contains low-quality, friable slate that contains a large number of fossils. This vein was not worked commercially at Bryn Eglwys. The British Geological Survey now considers the Middle Vein to be a part of the Broad Vein, not a separate formation.

The third vein is the Narrow Vein which lies about 100 yards (91 m) south of the Middle Vein and is also about 60 feet (18 m) thick. It contains the highest quality slate of the three veins and the most commercially valuable, being easy to split into roofing slates and slabs and both durable and strong. The vein is mostly a continuous bed of slate, containing only the occasional seam of quartz. However, the quality of the rock varies over the depth of the vein, with the best material being found nearest the surface.

== Description ==
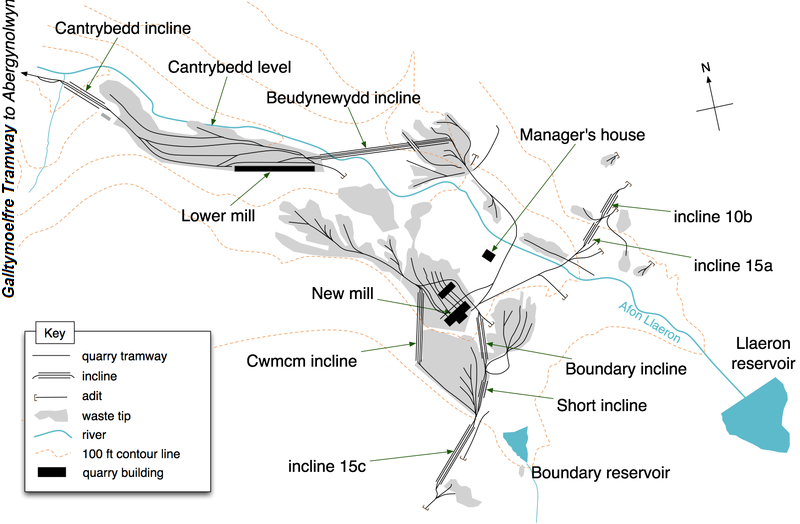
Map of Bryn Eglwys showing major tramways and workings

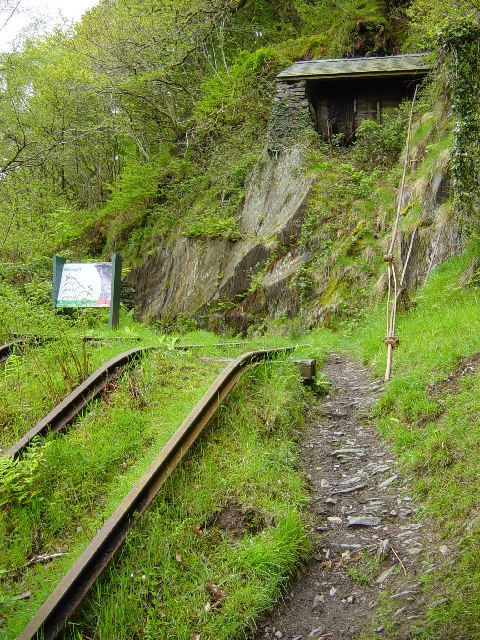
The top of The Alltwyllt Incline, the first incline leading to the quarry from Nant Gwernol station / sidings
