= Abergynolwyn =

Village in North Wales

Coordinates: 52°38′41″N 3°57′25″W

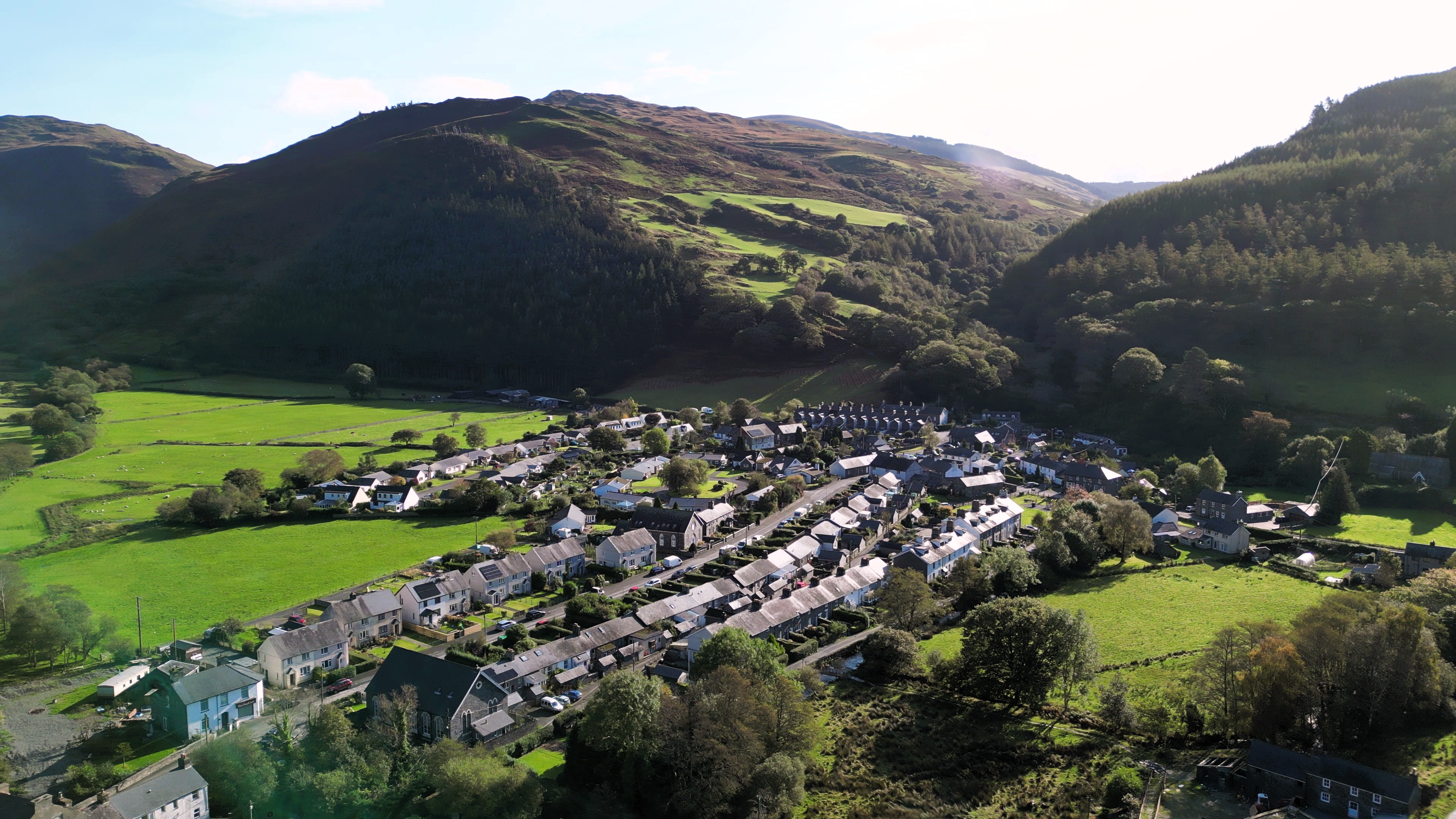
- Abergynolwyn

- Location within Gwynedd
- OS grid reference: SH679070
- Community: Llanfihangel-y-Pennant
- Principal area: Gwynedd
- Preserved county: Gwynedd
- Country: Wales
- Sovereign state: United Kingdom
- Post town: TYWYN
- Postcode district: LL36
- Dialling code: 01654
- Police: North Wales
- Fire: North Wales
- Ambulance: Welsh
- UK Parliament: Dwyfor Meirionnydd
- Senedd Cymru – Welsh Parliament: Gwynedd Maldwyn

Abergynolwyn (English: Mouth of the River with a Whirlpool) is a village in southern Gwynedd, Wales, located at the confluence of the Nant Gwernol and the Afon Dysynni. The population of the community which is named after the village of Llanfihangel-y-Pennant was 339 at the 2011 census.

== History ==
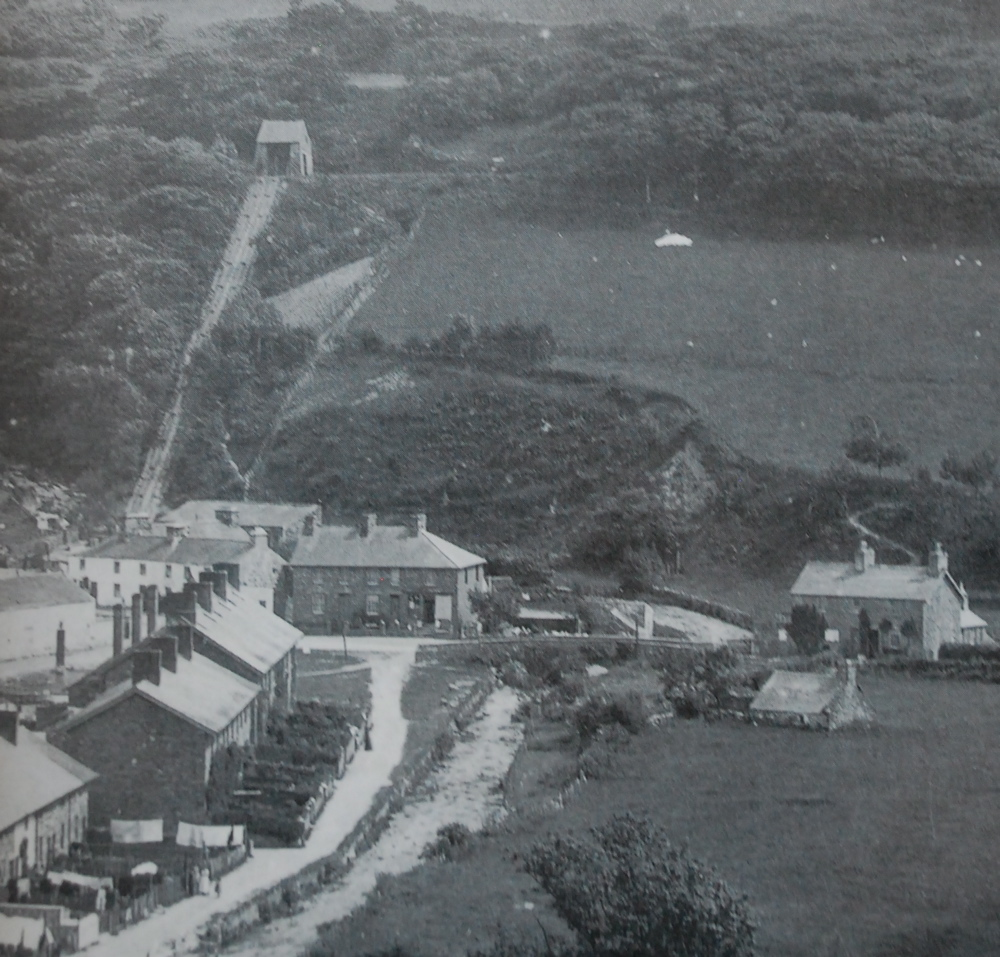
Abergynolwyn around 1880, showing the village incline

Historically, the village was part of Merionethshire and its main industry was slate quarrying. The village was founded in the 1860s to house workers at the nearby Bryn Eglwys and at one time the village had an Anglican church and three nonconformist chapels. The slate was shipped to the coast on the Talyllyn Railway. A decline in the demand for Welsh slate caused reductions in the workforce, and the quarry finally closed in 1948. Today farming, forestry and tourism are the major local industries.

== Transport ==
=== Talyllyn Railway ===
The village pub, the Railway Inn, is named after the Talyllyn Railway whose narrow gauge branch once reached into the heart of the village down an incline from a ledge on the hillside above. The railway now terminates at Nant Gwernol station above the village, although for many years the terminus was at Abergynolwyn station outside the village.

=== Road transport ===
The village is situated on the B4405 road, which passes through the centre, and is served by the G24 bus route. In 2024, there are 5 buses per day to Tywyn and Machynlleth/Dolgellau on weekdays and 3 on Saturdays.

== Local attractions ==
Llyn Mwyngil (Tal-y-llyn Lake), just upstream from Abergynolwyn is an unspoilt lake, one of the finest examples of a glacial ribbon lake in Europe, with many of the glacial features still in evidence, including a distinctive moraine, resembling a basket of eggs. Hiking trails to the summit of Cadair Idris start from here. The Iron Age fort on Craig yr Aderyn shows that the area was strategically important in prehistoric times. In 1221, the mediaeval Welsh castle of Castell y Bere near Llanfihangel-y-pennant was built by Llewellyn the Great, occupied by the Welsh and later besieged by forces under Edward I of England in 1282.
