= Nant Gwernol railway station =

Railway station near Abergynolwyn, Wales

Nant Gwernol
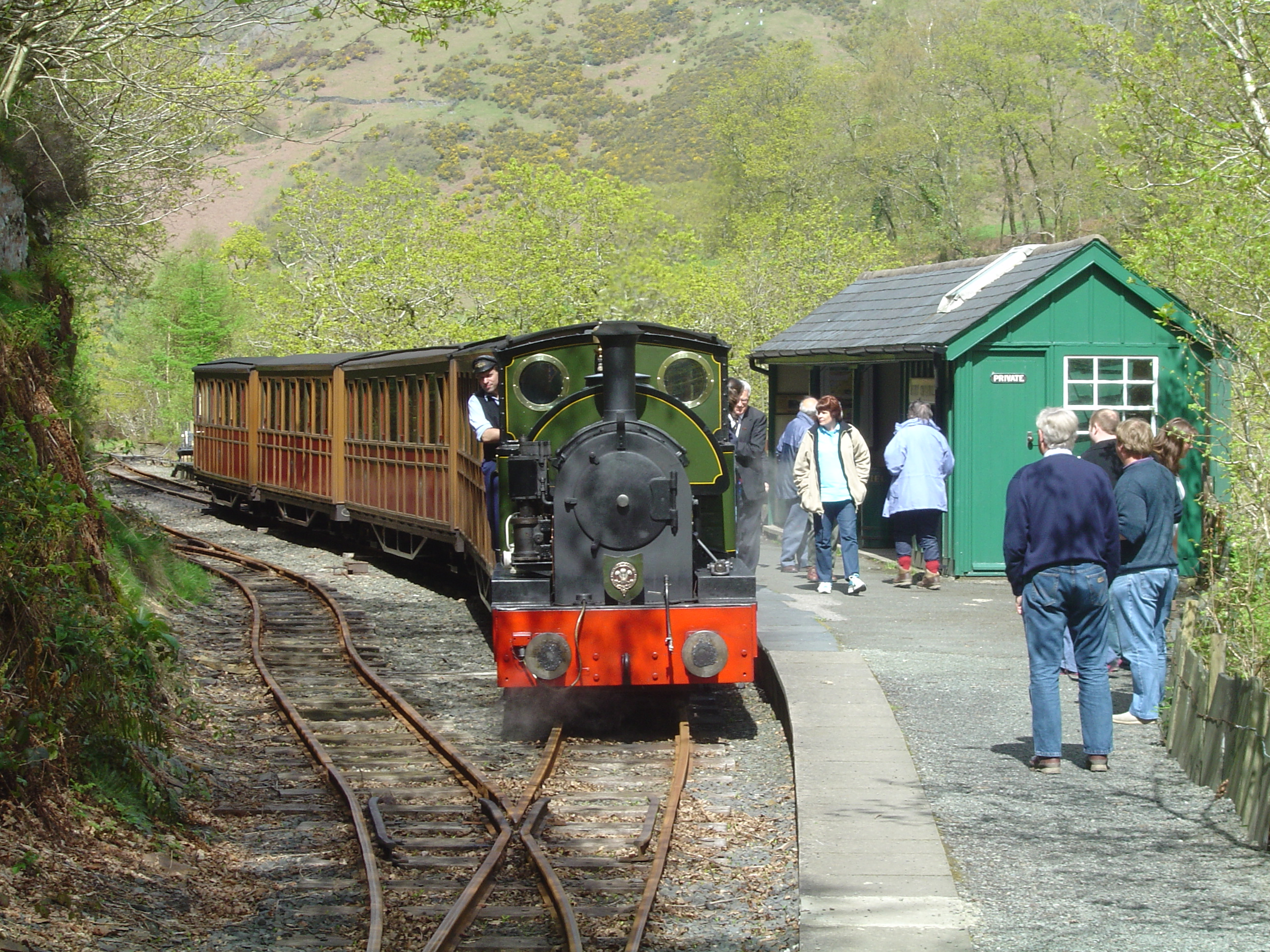
- A train in Nant Gwernol Station. 29 April 2005

General information
- Location: Abergynolwyn, Gwynedd; Wales
- Coordinates: 52°38′31″N 3°57′3″W
- Grid reference: SH680065
- System: Station on heritage railway
- Owner: Talyllyn Railway
- Manager: Talyllyn Railway
- Platforms: 1

Key dates
- 1865: Small marshalling yard built here for management of incoming traffic from the Alltwyllt incline
- 1946: Bryn-Eglwys Quarry closed, thus traffic on incline ceased and the railway here became disused
- 1976: Opened to passenger traffic with the name of 'Nant Gwernol'
Location

Nant Gwernol railway station is the eastern terminus of the Talyllyn Railway near Abergynolwyn, Gwynedd in mid-Wales. It is 7 miles, 28 chains (11.83 km) from Tywyn Wharf. Nant Gwernol station was opened in 1976; before 1976 this upper part of the line had only been used for goods services.

The station is built on the site of the former marshalling yard at the foot of the Alltwyllt incline, which was the first of the two inclines between the Talyllyn Railway and the Bryn Eglwys slate quarry. This site was chosen as the terminus of the passenger line, as it was the limit of locomotive working. The station building is of timber construction, based on the station building at Pendre and the original station building at Abergynolwyn.

Trains only wait at the station long enough for the locomotive to run round, as there are no facilities at that point. Most trains pause at Abergynolwyn station to allow passengers time for refreshments. There is no road access to the station, though several footpaths lead off up the incline or towards the road between Bryn-Eglwys and Abergynolwyn.

The station's name was taken from the nearby Nant Gwernol stream, and means "Alder Stream".

== Bibliography ==
- Caton, Peter (2018). Remote Stations. Leicestershire: Matador. ISBN 978-1-78901-408-2.
- Talyllyn Railway Guide Book

Preceding station	Heritage railways	Following station
Abergynolwyn towards Tywyn Wharf	Talyllyn Railway	Terminus
