= Tywyn Wharf railway station =

Railway station in Wales

Tywyn Wharf
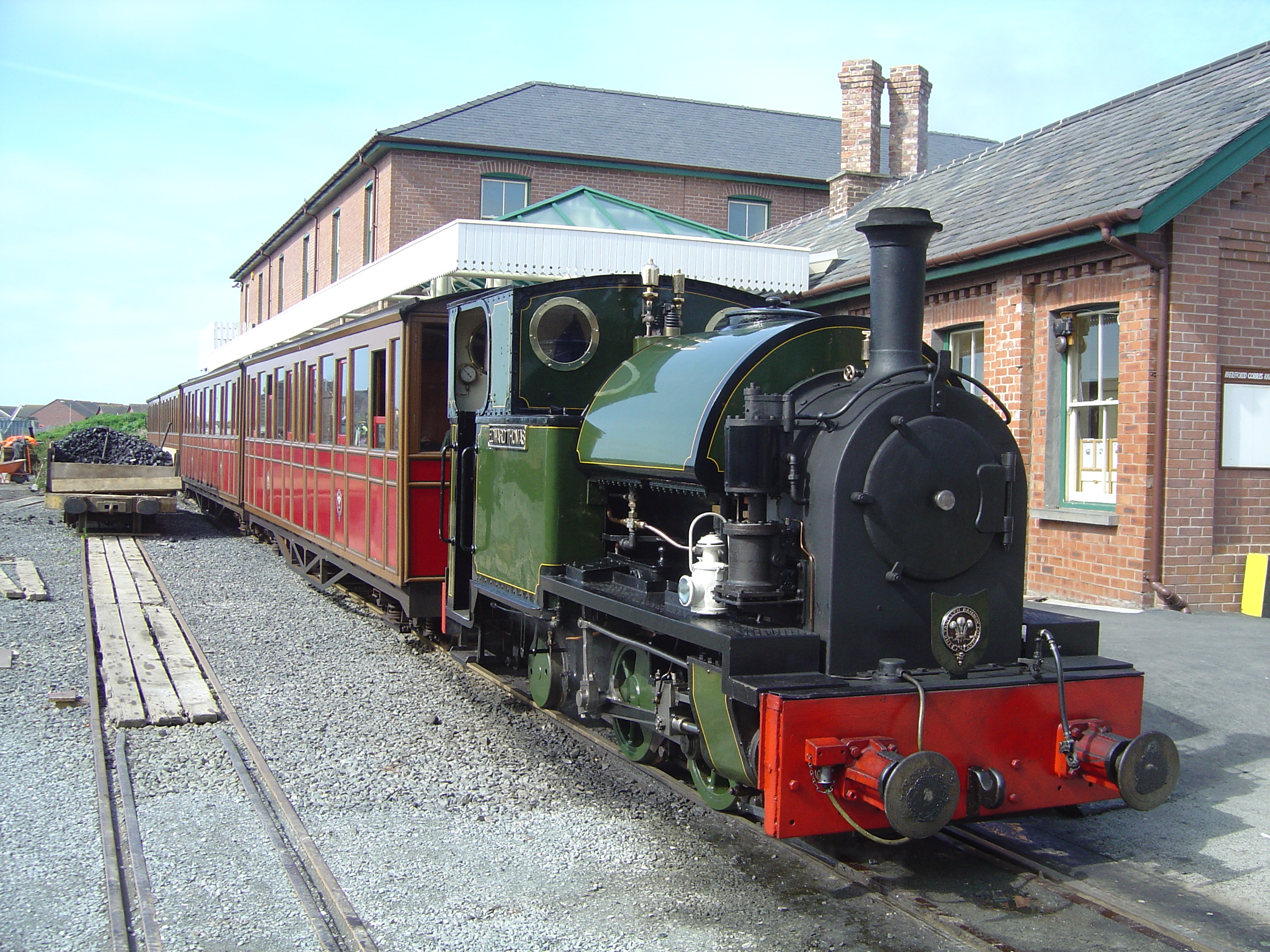
- Edward Thomas in Tywyn Wharf Station. 29 April 2005.

General information
- Location: Tywyn, Gwynedd; Wales
- Coordinates: 52.583647°N 4.088783°W
- Grid reference: SH586004
- System: Station on heritage railway
- Owner: Talyllyn Railway
- Manager: Talyllyn Railway
- Platforms: 1

Key dates
- 1866: Opened for goods as Kings
- c.1911: Opened for passengers as Towyn Wharf
- 1975: Renamed Tywyn Wharf
Location

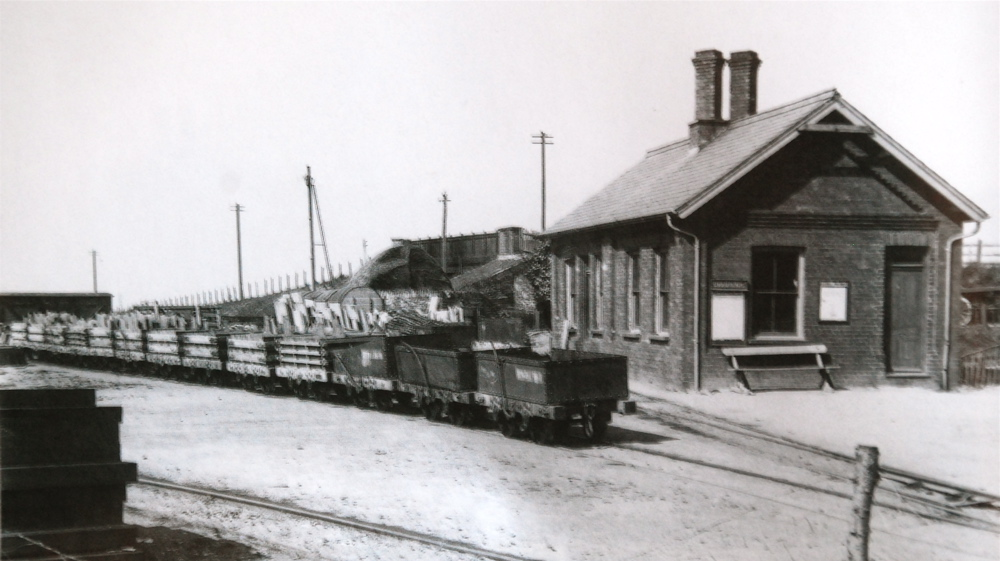
Tywyn Wharf station in 1905

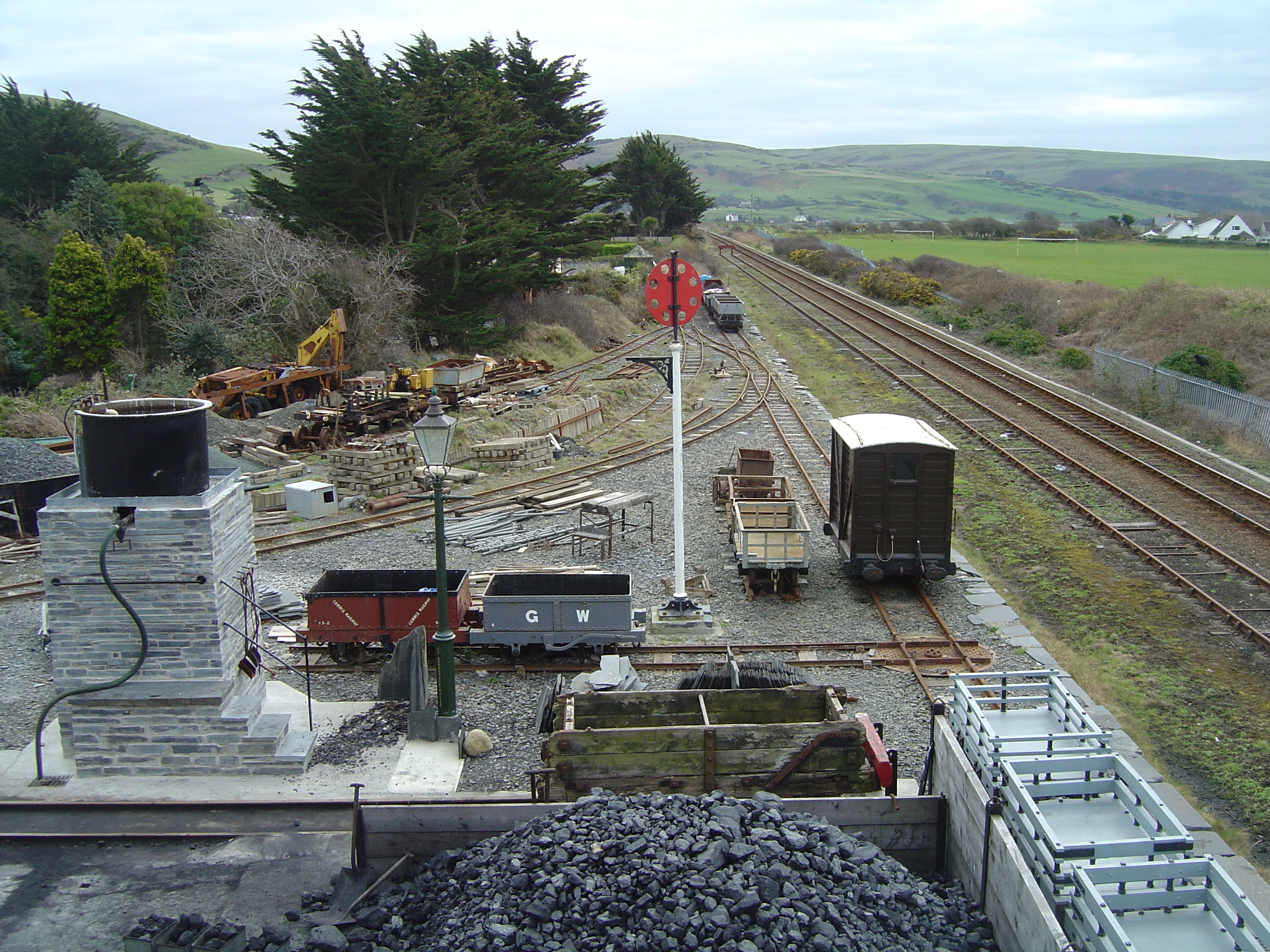
Wharf station in 2008, showing the original slate loading wharf

Tywyn Wharf railway station is the western terminus and principal station of the Talyllyn Railway in Tywyn, Gwynedd in mid-Wales.

== History ==
Originally called King's station after a local landowner, it was not a passenger station at first, but a place for transhipment of slates from the narrow gauge to the adjoining Cambrian Railway. Passenger trains started at the next station, Pendre. The original TR plans included a spur into the standard gauge station called 'Railway No 2', but in the end it wasn't necessary, traffic wasn't sufficient and the powers to build it lapsed.

The earliest recorded passenger train from Wharf was in 1877, though there is circumstantial evidence of them even earlier than that. Around 1910, the station was renamed Towyn Wharf, although the name of "King's station" continued to be used for formal occasions until at least 1915. The station had no run-round loop at the time; shunting was carried out by propelling trains up the gradient out of the station and allowing them to run in under gravity. A siding was provided in the cutting just to the east of the station, to aid this gravity working. Passenger trains were propelled to the loop at Pendre, where they were run-around. It was only after the line had been preserved in 1951 that a loop was finally provided, in the winter of 1951–1952.

As with all stations on the railway, there is only one platform, on the north side of the line, and the coaches have doors on that side only. This is due to tight clearances under the bridges. There are also sidings, a water tower and coaling stage. Llechfan, the hostel provided for volunteers on the railway, is a former private house on the opposite side of the line.

== Station environment ==
As the line leaves the station it passes under a road bridge that carries the A493 Machynlleth to Dolgellau road. This bridge was rebuilt in 1955 by Merioneth County Council, having become unsafe due to the heavier traffic passing over it. The council had argued that the Talyllyn, as builders and therefore owners of the bridge, should pay for repairs. However, the secretary of the society replied that the contribution towards repair would be "limited to the cost of putting the decking into a safe condition to carry the loads for which it was originally designed. If the council wishes the bridge to carry heavier loads than those envisaged in 1865 then it would have to be responsible for the additional strengthening required."

== Narrow Gauge Railway Museum ==
The Narrow Gauge Railway Museum was first built here in 1955 in a disused gunpowder store, housing some relics and locomotives which had been donated to the Talyllyn but for various reasons were not suitable for use. This was later moved into a separate building. Since then, the station building and museum have both been extended culminating in the opening in 2005 of a brand new museum, shop and café by the Prince of Wales and the Duchess of Cornwall, following demolition of the previous museum building.

== In popular culture ==
Tywyn Wharf served as the basis for Crovan's Gate Wharf in The Railway Series by Rev. Wilbert Awdry.

== Layout ==
Layout of King's Station in 1865	Layout of Wharf station in 1964

Preceding station	Heritage railways	Following station
Terminus	Talyllyn Railway	Pendre towards Nant Gwernol
National Rail
Change for Tywyn railway station on the Cambrian Line
