= Island of Sodor =

Fictional island

- The Railway Series and Thomas & Friends location
- A map of the Island of Sodor showing the railway system
- First appearance: The Three Railway Engines (1945)
- Created by: Wilbert Awdry

In-universe information
- Type: Island
- Location: East of Isle of Man and West of Barrow-in-Furness

The Island of Sodor, or simply Sodor, is a fictional island that is the primary setting for The Railway Series books by Wilbert Awdry and its television adaptation Thomas & Friends and other media in the Thomas franchise. It lies in the Irish Sea between Cumbria and the Isle of Man. The island has many railways, including many locomotives such as Thomas the Tank Engine.

== Inspiration and creation ==
The Railway Series author Wilbert Awdry wanted a consistent set of locations for The Railway Series. He wanted them to be in Great Britain, (Note: In The Island of Sodor: Its People, History and Railways, Awdry explained that Sodor was politically part of the United Kingdom. While the Isle of Man had retained home rule, since the 15th century, Sodor had been attached to the Duchy of Lancaster and is therefore part of England, although this has not been allowed to disturb the Sudrians' independent lives.) but sufficiently isolated from British Railways to allow him to write the stories he wanted. He was inspired during a 1950 visit to the Isle of Man, which forms the Diocese of Sodor and Man. Awdry, a Church of England cleric, noted that while there was an Isle of Man, there was no island of Sodor. (Note: "Sodor" is in fact an anglicization of Suðreyjar ("southern isles"), a Norse name for the Hebrides. The Hebrides belonged to the Diocese of Sodor and Man until the 14th century, when the two parts of the see were disjointed.) He decided to create a fictional island of "Sodor" as the setting for his books. Sodor would be between England and the Isle of Man, isolated from the British railway system, but somewhere that readers could easily imagine.

Wilbert Awdry and his younger brother George worked out Sodor's history, geography, industry and language ("Sudric"). Inspiration came from various sources. Dryaw was an anagram of Awdry. Elsbridge was named after Wilbert's parish of Elsworth in Cambridgeshire. Some place-names were Sudric equivalents or near-equivalents of those in the real world (for instance, Skarloey was a rough Sudric equivalent of the Welsh Talyllyn: logh and llyn mean "lake" in Manx and Welsh respectively). They created more details of Sodor than would ever be used in The Railway Series stories. Their abridged notes were published in 1987 in a book titled The Island of Sodor: Its People, History and Railways (republished with some minor modifications by Christopher Awdry in 2005 under the title Sodor: Reading Between the Lines).

== Language ==
The fictional native language of Sodor is "Sudric" or "Sudrian", a Goidelic language similar to Manx.

Many of the place names are based on Manx words, but often conforming to English word order, e.g. Killdane, which comes from "Keeill-y-Deighan" (Church of the Devil), and the hills, called Knock and Cronk. The names of some of the "historical" characters – used in the background but not appearing in the stories – were taken from locations on the Isle of Man, such as Sir Crosby Marown (Crosby is a village in the parish of Marown) and Harold Regaby (Regaby is a tiny hamlet on the parish boundary between Andreas and Bride).

The flag of Sodor, as depicted in Thomas & Friends: The Great Race (2016)

Below are some words and phrases, and place-names translated into English:

Sudric	English
Nagh Beurla	I do not speak English
Keeill-y-Deighan	Church of the Devil
Cronk-ny-Braaid	Hill in the Valley
Croshbyr	Cross Farm
Ballahoo	The Farm on the River Hoo
Traugh	Sandy Beach
Gob-y-Deighan	Devil's Mouth
Wick	Inlet/Creek
Gleih	Blue
Knock	Hill
Rheneas	Divided Waterfall
Scaca	Wooded Hillside
Skarloey	Lake in the Woods
Hawin	River
Faarkey	Sea
Sudragh	Sodor
Crosh	Cross
Bry	Croft/Farm
Cros-ny-Cuirn	Ford of the Mountain Ash
Faarkey-y-Sudragh	Sudrian Sea
Culdee	Companion of God
Loey	Lake
Dreeym-y-Deighan	Devil's Back
Deighan	Devil
Kirk Machan	Machan's Church
Culdee Fell	The Mountain of the Companion of God
Fell	Mountain
Shane Dooiney	The Old Man
Shen Venn	The Old Woman
Glennock	Blue Hill
Peel Godred	Godred's Fort

== Geography ==
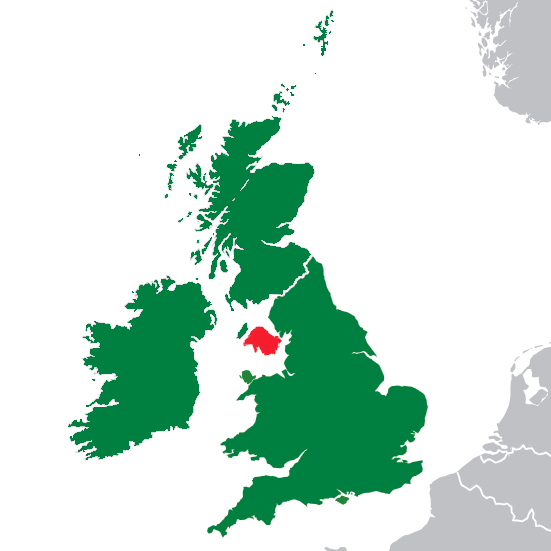
Map of Sodor depicted (in red) within the British Isles

Sodor is usually shown as much larger than the Isle of Man. The island is roughly diamond-shaped, 62 miles (100 km) wide east to west and 51 miles (82 km) long north to south, making it 3,162 square miles (8,189 square kilometres). Its north-west coast is separated from the Isle of Man by a strait called the Sudrian Sea (Faarkey-y-Sudragh), four miles (6 kilometres) wide. In the north-east, it overrides and replaces the real Walney Island. Its highest mountain is Culdee Fell, which was modelled on Snowdon: the ridge of Devil's Back copies the Clogwyn ridge on Snowdon. The summit is reached by the Culdee Fell Railway, which is based on the Snowdon Mountain Railway in Wales.

The capital and administrative centre of Sodor is the city of Suddery; Tidmouth is the largest town on the island. One of the more famous settlements on Sodor is Ffarquhar, the terminus of Thomas's branch line.

== Railways ==
The railways of Sodor include standard and narrow gauge railways, a rack railway and a 15-inch gauge railway. The first several stories concerned standard-gauge engines. Stories set around the narrow gauge railways soon followed.

The standard-gauge railway system, known as the North Western Railway, consists of a mainline and several branch lines. They are linked to and interoperable with each other and with the mainland system, so that the standard-gauge engines can visit locations in Britain under their own power. In Gordon Goes Foreign, several of the engines recount working in London when they were younger, and later in the same story, Gordon pulls the Wild Nor’ Wester to London. In the story The Fat Controller's Engines, eight of the famous engines visit London.

There are three narrow-gauge railways: the Skarloey Railway, the rack-and-pinion Culdee Fell Mountain Railway, and the 15-inch gauge Arlesdale Railway. On the west side of the island, the 15 in (381 mm) gauge Arlesdale Railway runs from Arlesdale West along the trackbed of the abandoned Mid-Sodor Railway. In the centre of the island, the Culdee Fell Mountain Railway runs west from Kirk Machan to the summit of Culdee Fell. On the eastern side of the island, the Skarloey Railway runs northwest from Crovan's Gate up the valley to its namesake, Skarloey Lake. Rolling stock is moved to and from the narrow-gauge railways on flatbed wagons on the standard-gauge system; for example, Rheneas is sent away for repairs in Skarloey Remembers and returns in Gallant Old Engine.

Each of the narrow-gauge railways links to the standard-gauge system at an interchange station:

- the Skarloey Railway at Crovan's Gate
- the Culdee Fell Railway at Kirk Machan
- the Arlesdale Railway at Arlesburgh West

=== Description of lines ===
- The North Western Railway is the main railway company featured in the books. It controls the main line and many of the branch lines on Sodor and is often referred to as "the Fat Controller's Railway".
  - The Main Line runs from Barrow-in-Furness on the mainland, joining the island at Vicarstown and transversing the island to Tidmouth. Its main traffic is the Wild Nor' Wester, an express train from Tidmouth to London, a stopping passenger service dubbed "The Local", and freight traffic.
  - The Ffarquhar Branch Line runs from Knapford to Ffarquhar. It is operated by Thomas' push-pull train and Daisy the diesel railcar. 8 trains a day are provided each way.
  - The Brendam Branch Line goes all the way to Brendam from Wellsworth. It links the china-clay works at Brendam to the main line. It is run by Edward, who manages passenger traffic and possibly more engines. At peak hours, there is an extended commuter service, during which trains run back to Tidmouth.
  - The Little Western runs along the coast from Tidmouth to Arlesburgh. It has an hourly service operated by Duck and Oliver with their GWR-style auto-coach.
  - The Peel Godred Branch runs from Killdane to Peel Godred and connects with the Culdee Fell Railway. There are 8 trains both ways hauled by electric locomotives, being the only line on Sodor that is electrified. 4 of these trains, presumably the ones in peak hours, continue to Cronk. The line also serves the Aluminium Works at Peel Godred, and has to handle heavy freight traffic of bauxite and aluminium products. The line is technically a light railway, which means trains on it are limited to 25 mph.
  - Two other North Western Railway branch lines detailed on the maps of Sodor have not featured in The Railway Series. They run from:
    - Vicarstown to Norramby, via Ballahoo. This line has hourly trains as well as a half-hourly suburban service at peak hours. The suburban trains are operated as a joint service between the NWR and The Other Railway (which was originally the London, Midland and Scottish Railway, later British Rail and currently Northern Trains).
    - Kellsthorpe Road to Kirk Ronan.
- The Arlesdale Railway (also known as Small Railway), a 15 inch gauge railway, takes waste from the mines in the hills to Arlesburgh where it could be distributed to the rest of the island. It also carries tourists.
- The Culdee Fell Railway, a narrow-gauge rack-and-pinion mountain railway, runs from the summit of Culdee Fell down to Kirk Machan where it links to the standard-gauge line from Kildane to Peel Godred.
- The Mid Sodor Railway, a narrow-gauge railway, closed in 1947. It ran from Arlesburgh to King 'Orry's Bridge in Peel Godred. Part of its route is now on the 15-inch gauge Arlesdale Railway.
- The Skarloey Railway, a narrow-gauge railway, runs from Crovan's Gate (where it links to the North Western Railway) up to Skarloey, with a loop line from Rheneas to Skarloey.

== See also ==
- United Kingdom
- Irish Sea
- Walney Channel
