= List of standardised Welsh place-names in Gwynedd =

Location of the modern county of Gwynedd in Wales.

The list of standardised Welsh place-names, for places in Gwynedd, is a list compiled by the Welsh Language Commissioner to recommend the standardisation of the spelling of Welsh place-names, particularly in the Welsh language and when multiple forms are used, although some place-names in English were also recommended to be matched with the Welsh. The list contains 317 entries, as of November 2023.

The list is based on recommendations provided by the Place-names Standardisation Panel, convened by the Commissioner, for expert advice on the standardisation of Welsh place-names. The panel bases their decisions on a set of guidelines (currently dating to June 2023), specific to Welsh settlement names (such as those of villages, towns, and cities) and topographic features (such as lakes, mountains and rivers). The panel does not cover house or building names, although similar principles could be applied to them or to names for new developments (for which the Commissioner offers their own advice to local authorities and housing developers). The panel may also have used additional guidelines.

The list was first published in 2018, and took years to put together. Upon creation, these lists were published under the Open Government Licence 3.0.

The Welsh name change of Barmouth, from Abermaw / Y Bermo to Abermo was criticised by a local historian in 2018, in the November 2023 list, it seems to have been replaced with Y Bermo in Welsh.

== List ==
Recommended standardised names		Other name/spelling not recommended	Type	Grid reference
Welsh	English	Other name/spelling not recommended	Type	Grid reference
Aberangell	Aberangell		Settlement	SH8410
Abercywarch	Abercywarch	Aber-Cywarch	Settlement	SH8615
Aberdaron	Aberdaron		Settlement	SH1726
Aberdesach	Aberdesach		Settlement	SH4251
Aberdyfi	Aberdyfi		Settlement	SN6196
Aber-erch	Aber-erch	Abererch	Settlement	SH3936
Abergeirw	Abergeirw		Settlement	SH7629
Aberglaslyn	Aberglaslyn		Man-made feature	SH5946
Abergwyngregyn	Abergwyngregyn		Settlement	SH6572
Abergynolwyn	Abergynolwyn		Settlement	SH6706
Aberllefenni	Aberllefenni		Settlement	SH7709
Aber-pwll	Aber-pwll		Area	SH5368
Abersoch	Abersoch		Settlement	SH3128
Abertrinant	Abertrinant		Settlement	SH6405
Afon-wen	Afon-wen	Afon Wen	Settlement	SH4437
Anelog	Anelog		Settlement	SH1527
Arthog	Arthog		Settlement	SH6414
Y Bala	Y Bala	Bala	Settlement	SH9236
Bangor	Bangor		Settlement	SH5771
Bangor Uchaf	Upper Bangor		Settlement	SH5772
Beddgelert	Beddgelert		Settlement	SH5948
Bethania	Bethania		Settlement	SH7045
Bethel	Bethel		Settlement	SH5265
Bethel	Bethel		Settlement	SH9839
Bethesda	Bethesda		Settlement	SH6266
Bethesda Bach	Bethesda Bach		Settlement	SH4656
Betws Garmon	Betws Garmon		Settlement	SH5357
Blaen Nanmor	Blaen Nanmor		Area	SH6348
Blaenau Ffestiniog	Blaenau Ffestiniog		Settlement	SH7045
Boduan	Boduan		Settlement	SH3237
Y Bont-ddu	Y Bont-ddu	Bontddu	Settlement	SH6618
Y Bontnewydd	Y Bontnewydd	Bontnewydd	Settlement	SH4859
Y Bontnewydd	Y Bontnewydd		Area	SH7720
Borth-y-Gest	Borth-y-Gest		Settlement	SH5637
Botwnnog	Botwnnog		Settlement	SH2631
Braichmelyn	Braichmelyn		Area	SH6265
Braichtalog	Braichtalog		Settlement	SH6067
Brithdir	Brithdir		Area	SH7618
Bronaber	Bronaber		Settlement	SH7131
Bron-y-môr	Bron-y-môr		Area	SH5700
Brynbwbach	Brynbwbach		Settlement	SH6236
Bryncir	Bryncir	Brynkir	Settlement	SH4844
Bryncoedifor	Bryncoedifor		Settlement	SH7920
Bryncroes	Bryncroes		Settlement	SH2231
Bryn-crug	Bryn-crug	Bryncrug	Settlement	SH6003
Bryneglwys	Bryneglwys	Bryn Eglwys	Settlement	SH6066
Bryn-llwyd	Bryn-llwyd		Area	SH5670
Bryn-mawr	Bryn-mawr		Area	SH4243
Brynrefail	Brynrefail		Settlement	SH5562
Bwlchderwin	Bwlchderwin		Settlement	SH4546
Bwlchtocyn	Bwlchtocyn		Settlement	SH3126
Bwlch-y-llyn	Bwlch-y-llyn		Settlement	SH5055
Caeathro	Caeathro		Settlement	SH5061
Cae-clyd	Cae-clyd	Cae Clyd	Settlement	SH7144
Caerdeon	Caerdeon		Area	SH6518
Caerhun	Caerhun		Settlement	SH5769
Caernarfon	Caernarfon		Settlement	SH4862
Caletwr	Caletwr		Area	SH9734
Camlan	Camlan		Area	SH8511
Capel Uchaf	Capel Uchaf		Settlement	SH4349
Carmel	Carmel		Settlement	SH4954
Carreg-y-gath	Carreg-y-gath		Settlement	SH5865
Cefnddwygraig	Cefnddwygraig		Area	SH9233
Cefnddwysarn	Cefnddwysarn		Settlement	SH9638
Ceidio	Ceidio		Man-made feature	SH2837
Cennin	Cennin		Settlement	SH4644
Ceunant	Ceunant		Area	SH5361
Chwilog	Chwilog		Settlement	SH4338
Cilan	Cilan		Settlement	SH2924
Cilfodan	Cilfodan		Area	SH6266
Cilgwyn	Cilgwyn		Area	SH4954
Ciltalgarth	Ciltalgarth		Area	SH8840
Clwt-y-bont	Clwt-y-bont		Settlement	SH5762
Clynnog Fawr	Clynnog Fawr		Settlement	SH4149
Coed-mawr	Coed-mawr		Settlement	SH5670
Coed-y-parc	Coed-y-parc		Settlement	SH6166
Coedystumgwern	Coedystumgwern		Settlement	SH5823
Congl-y-wal	Congl-y-wal		Settlement	SH7044
Corris	Corris		Settlement	SH7507
Corris Uchaf	Corris Uchaf		Settlement	SH7408
Cricieth	Cricieth	Criccieth	Settlement	SH5038
Croesor	Croesor		Settlement	SH6344
Croes-y-waun	Croes-y-waun		Settlement	SH5259
Cutiau	Cutiau		Settlement	SH6317
Cwmcewydd	Cwmcewydd		Settlement	SH8713
Cwm-y-glo	Cwm-y-glo		Settlement	SH5562
Cwrt	Cwrt		Settlement	SH6800
Cywarch	Cywarch		Area	SH8518
Deiniolen	Deiniolen		Settlement	SH5763
Dinas	Dinas		Settlement	SH2636
Dinas	Dinas		Settlement	SH4858
Dinas Dinlle	Dinas Dinlle		Settlement	SH4356
Dinas Mawddwy	Dinas Mawddwy		Settlement	SH8514
Dinorwig	Dinorwig		Settlement	SH5961
Dolbenmaen	Dolbenmaen		Settlement	SH5043
Dolgellau	Dolgellau		Settlement	SH7217
Dôl-goch	Dôl-goch	Dolgoch	Settlement	SH6504
Dolhendre	Dolhendre		Area	SH8531
Dôl-y-cae	Dôl-y-cae		Area	SH7211
Dolydd	Dolydd		Settlement	SH4757
Drws-y-coed	Drws-y-coed		Area	SH5453
Dyffryn	Dyffryn		Settlement	SH5823
Dyffryn Ardudwy	Dyffryn Ardudwy		Settlement	SH5823
Edern	Edern		Settlement	SH2739
Efailnewydd	Efailnewydd		Settlement	SH3535
Eisingrug	Eisingrug		Settlement	SH6134
Y Fach-wen	Y Fach-wen		Settlement	SH5761
Fairbourne	Fairbourne		Settlement	SH6113
Y Felinheli	Y Felinheli		Settlement	SH5267
Felin-hen	Felin-hen	Felin Hen	Settlement	SH5868
Y Ffôr	Y Ffôr		Settlement	SH3938
Y Friog	Y Friog	Friog	Settlement	SH6112
Y Fron	Y Fron		Settlement	SH5154
Fron-goch	Fron-goch	Frongoch	Settlement	SH9039
Gallt-y-foel	Gallt-y-foel		Settlement	SH5862
Y Ganllwyd	Y Ganllwyd	Ganllwyd	Settlement	SH7224
Garndolbenmaen	Garndolbenmaen		Settlement	SH4944
Garnfadrun	Garnfadrun	Carn Fadryn	Settlement	SH2834
Garreg	Garreg		Settlement	SH6141
Garth	Garth		Area	SH5873
Gellilydan	Gellilydan		Settlement	SH6839
Gerlan	Gerlan		Settlement	SH6366
Glan Dwyfach	Glan Dwyfach		Area	SH4843
Glanadda	Glanadda		Settlement	SH5770
Glan-y-pwll	Glan-y-pwll		Settlement	SH6946
Glanyrafon	Glanyrafon	Glan-yr-afon	Settlement	SJ0242
Glan-y-wern	Glan-y-wern		Settlement	SH6034
Glasinfryn	Glasinfryn		Settlement	SH5868
Glynllifon	Glynllifon		Man-made feature	SH4555
Golan	Golan		Settlement	SH5242
Groesffordd	Groesffordd		Settlement	SH2739
Y Groeslon	Y Groeslon	Groeslon	Settlement	SH4755
Gwastadnant	Gwastadnant		Settlement	SH6157
Gwastadros	Gwastadros		Area	SH8835
Gwydir	Gwydir		Man-made feature	SH7961
Gyrn Goch	Gyrn Goch		Topographical feature	SH4047
Harlech	Harlech		Settlement	SH5831
Hen-barc	Hen-barc		Area	SH6267
Hirael	Hirael		Settlement	SH5872
Islaw'r-dref	Islaw'r-dref		Area	SH6815
Llan Ffestiniog	Llan Ffestiniog		Settlement	SH7041
Llanaber	Llanaber		Settlement	SH6017
Llanaelhaearn	Llanaelhaearn		Settlement	SH3844
Llanarmon	Llanarmon		Settlement	SH4239
Llanbedr	Llanbedr		Settlement	SH5826
Llanbedrog	Llanbedrog		Settlement	SH3231
Llanberis	Llanberis		Settlement	SH5760
Llandanwg	Llandanwg		Settlement	SH5628
Llanddeiniolen	Llanddeiniolen		Settlement	SH5466
Llandderfel	Llandderfel		Settlement	SH9837
Llandecwyn	Llandecwyn		Settlement	SH6337
Llandwrog	Llandwrog		Settlement	SH4556
Llandygái	Llandygái	Llandygai	Settlement	SH5970
Llanegryn	Llanegryn		Settlement	SH6005
Llanelltud	Llanelltud	Llanelltyd	Settlement	SH7119
Llanenddwyn	Llanenddwyn		Settlement	SH5723
Llanengan	Llanengan		Settlement	SH2926
Llanfachreth	Llanfachreth		Settlement	SH7522
Llanfaglan	Llanfaglan		Settlement	SH4760
Llanfair	Llanfair		Settlement	SH5729
Llanfihangel-y-Pennant	Llanfihangel-y-Pennant		Settlement	SH5244
Llanfihangel-y-Pennant	Llanfihangel-y-Pennant		Settlement	SH6708
Llanfor	Llanfor		Settlement	SH9336
Llanfrothen	Llanfrothen		Settlement	SH6241
Llangelynnin	Llangelynnin		Settlement	SH5707
Llangïan	Llangïan	Llangian	Settlement	SH2928
Llangwnnadl	Llangwnnadl		Settlement	SH2032
Llangybi	Llangybi		Settlement	SH4241
Llangywer	Llangywer	Llangower	Settlement	SH9032
Llaniestyn	Llaniestyn		Settlement	SH2733
Llanllechid	Llanllechid		Settlement	SH6268
Llanllyfni	Llanllyfni		Settlement	SH4751
Llannerchfydaf	Llannerchfydaf		Area	SH9017
Llannor	Llannor		Settlement	SH3537
Llanrug	Llanrug		Settlement	SH5363
Llanuwchllyn	Llanuwchllyn		Settlement	SH8730
Llanwnda	Llanwnda		Settlement	SH4758
Llanycil	Llanycil		Settlement	SH9134
Llanymawddwy	Llanymawddwy		Settlement	SH9019
Llanystumdwy	Llanystumdwy		Settlement	SH4738
Llecheiddior	Llecheiddior		Area	SH4743
Llidiardau	Llidiardau		Area	SH8738
Llidiart y Barwn	Llidiart y Barwn		Topographical feature	SH9012
Llithfaen	Llithfaen		Settlement	SH3543
Llwyndyrys	Llwyndyrys		Settlement	SH3741
Llwyngwril	Llwyngwril		Settlement	SH5909
Llwynhudol	Llwynhudol		Settlement	SH3836
Llynpenmaen	Penmaen-pŵl	Penmaenpool	Settlement	SH6918
Machroes	Machroes		Settlement	SH3126
Maenofferen	Maenofferen		Area	SH7045
Maentwrog	Maentwrog		Settlement	SH6640
Maesgeirchen	Maesgeirchen		Settlement	SH5871
Maesglasau	Maesglasau		Area	SH8114
Mallwyd	Mallwyd		Settlement	SH8612
Manod	Manod		Settlement	SH7044
Minffordd	Minffordd		Settlement	SH5770
Minffordd	Minffordd		Settlement	SH5938
Minllyn	Minllyn		Settlement	SH8514
Moelyci	Moelyci		Topographical feature	SH5966
Morfa	Morfa		Settlement	SH1933
Morfa Bychan	Morfa Bychan		Settlement	SH5437
Morfa Nefyn	Morfa Nefyn		Settlement	SH2840
Mynydd Llandygái	Mynydd Llandygái	Mynydd Llandygai	Settlement	SH6065
Mynytho	Mynytho		Settlement	SH3030
Nanhoron	Nanhoron		Man-made feature	SH2831
Nantgwynant	Nantgwynant	Nant Gwynant	Settlement	SH6351
Nantlle	Nantlle		Settlement	SH5053
Nantmor	Nantmor		Settlement	SH6046
Nantperis	Nantperis	Nant Peris	Settlement	SH6058
Nasareth	Nasareth		Settlement	SH4750
Nebo	Nebo		Settlement	SH4750
Nefyn	Nefyn		Settlement	SH3040
Pandy	Pandy		Area	SH8729
Pant-glas	Pant-glas	Pant Glas	Settlement	SH4747
Pantperthog	Pantperthog		Settlement	SH7404
Parc	Parc		Area	SH8733
Penantlliw	Penantlliw		Area	SH8132
Penbodlas	Penbodlas		Settlement	SH2833
Pencaenewydd	Pencaenewydd		Settlement	SH4041
Pen-dre	Pen-dre		Area	SH5900
Pengilfach	Pengilfach		Area	SH5661
Pengroeslon	Pengroeslon		Settlement	SH2130
Penhelyg	Penhelyg	Penhelig	Settlement	SN6296
Penisa'r-waun	Penisa'r-waun	Penisa'r Waun	Settlement	SH5563
Pen-lan	Pen-lan		Area	SH6139
Penmorfa	Penmorfa		Settlement	SH5440
Pennal	Pennal		Settlement	SH6900
Pen-rallt	Pen-rallt		Settlement	SH3735
Penrhos	Penrhos		Settlement	SH3433
Penrhosgarnedd	Penrhosgarnedd		Settlement	SH5570
Penrhyndeudraeth	Penrhyndeudraeth		Settlement	SH6139
Pentir	Pentir		Settlement	SH5766
Pentre Gwynfryn	Pentre Gwynfryn		Settlement	SH5927
Pentrefelin	Pentrefelin		Settlement	SH5239
Pentre-uchaf	Pentre-uchaf		Settlement	SH3539
Pen-y-bryn	Pen-y-bryn	Pen y Bryn	Settlement	SH6919
Penychain	Penychain		Man-made feature	SH4335
Pen-y-ffridd	Pen-y-ffridd		Area	SH5056
Pen-y-graig	Pen-y-graig		Settlement	SH2033
Pen-y-groes	Pen-y-groes	Penygroes	Settlement	SH4653
Pistyll	Pistyll		Settlement	SH3242
Pontllyfni	Pontllyfni		Settlement	SH4352
Pontrhythallt	Pontrhythallt		Settlement	SH5463
Pont-rug	Pont-rug		Settlement	SH5163
Porth Dinllaen	Porth Dinllaen	Porthdinllaen	Topographical feature	SH2841
Porth Penrhyn	Porth Penrhyn	Port Penrhyn	Settlement	SH5972
Porthmadog	Porthmadog		Settlement	SH5638
Portmeirion	Portmeirion		Settlement	SH5837
Pren-teg	Pren-teg	Prenteg	Settlement	SH5841
Pwllheli	Pwllheli		Settlement	SH3735
Rachub	Rachub		Settlement	SH6268
Y Rhiw	Y Rhiw		Settlement	SH2227
Rhiwbryfdir	Rhiwbryfdir		Settlement	SH6946
Rhiwlas	Rhiwlas		Settlement	SH5765
Rhos Isaf	Rhos Isaf		Settlement	SH4857
Rhos-ddu	Rhos-ddu		Settlement	SH2535
Rhosdylluan	Rhosdylluan		Settlement	SH8628
Rhos-fawr	Rhos-fawr		Settlement	SH3839
Rhosgadfan	Rhosgadfan		Settlement	SH5057
Rhosgyll	Rhosgyll		Area	SH4540
Rhoshirwaun	Rhoshirwaun		Area	SH1929
Rhos-lan	Rhos-lan		Area	SH4840
Rhoslefain	Rhoslefain		Settlement	SH5705
Rhostryfan	Rhostryfan		Settlement	SH4957
Rhosygwaliau	Rhosygwaliau	Rhos-y-gwaliau	Settlement	SH9434
Rhos-y-llan	Rhos-y-llan		Settlement	SH2337
Rhyd	Rhyd		Settlement	SH6341
Rhyd-ddu	Rhyd-ddu		Settlement	SH5652
Rhydlios	Rhydlios		Area	SH1830
Rhyduchaf	Rhyduchaf	Rhyd-uchaf	Settlement	SH9037
Rhydyclafdy	Rhydyclafdy		Settlement	SH3234
Rhydygwystl	Rhydygwystl		Settlement	SH4039
Rhyd-y-main	Rhyd-y-main		Area	SH8022
Rhydyronnen	Rhydyronnen	Rhyd-yr-onnen	Settlement	SH6102
Rhyd-y-sarn	Rhyd-y-sarn	Rhyd-y-Sarn	Settlement	SH6942
Sarn Mellteyrn	Sarn Mellteyrn	Sarn Meyllteyrn	Settlement	SH2332
Sarnau	Sarnau		Settlement	SH9739
Sarn-bach	Sarn-bach		Settlement	SH3026
Saron	Saron		Settlement	SH4658
Seion	Seion		Settlement	SH5467
Sling	Sling		Settlement	SH6067
Soar	Soar		Settlement	SH6135
Tabor	Tabor		Settlement	SH7517
Taimorfa	Taimorfa		Settlement	SH2826
Talardd	Talardd		Settlement	SH8926
Talsarnau	Talsarnau		Settlement	SH6135
Talweunydd	Talweunydd		Settlement	SH6947
Tal-y-bont	Tal-y-bont		Settlement	SH5921
Tal-y-bont	Tal-y-bont	Talybont	Settlement	SH6070
Tal-y-llyn	Tal-y-llyn		Settlement	SH7109
Tal-y-sarn	Tal-y-sarn	Talysarn	Settlement	SH4853
Tan-lan	Tan-lan		Settlement	SH6142
Tanygrisiau	Tanygrisiau		Settlement	SH6845
Tan-y-maes	Tan-y-maes		Area	SH5266
Tonfanau	Tonfanau		Man-made feature	SH5603
Traeth Mawr	Traeth Mawr		Area	SH5939
Trawsfynydd	Trawsfynydd		Settlement	SH7035
Tre-faes	Tre-faes		Settlement	SH2532
Trefeini	Trefeini		Area	SH7046
Trefor	Trefor		Settlement	SH3746
Tre-garth	Tre-garth	Tregarth	Settlement	SH6067
Tremadog	Tremadog		Settlement	SH5640
Tre'r-llan	Tre'r-llan		Settlement	SH9737
Tudweiliog	Tudweiliog		Settlement	SH2336
Tŷ-nant	Tŷ-nant		Area	SH9026
Tyn-y-maes	Tyn-y-maes		Settlement	SH6363
Tywyn	Tywyn		Settlement	SH5800
Uwchmynydd	Uwchmynydd		Area	SH1525
Waun	Waun		Settlement	SH5564
Waun Pentir	Waun Pentir		Settlement	SH5766
Waunfawr	Waunfawr		Settlement	SH5359
Waun-wen	Waun-wen		Settlement	SH5768
Wenallt	Wenallt		Settlement	SH7317
Yr Wyddfa	Snowdon		Topographical feature	SH6054
Y Bermo	Barmouth		Settlement	SH6115
Ynys	Ynys		Settlement	SH5935
Ynys Enlli	Bardsey		Island	SH1221
