= Ifor Owen =

- Born: 3 July 1915 Cefnddwysarn, Wales
- Died: 22 May 2007 (aged 91) Dolgellau, Wales
- Areas: Editor, illustrator, teacher
- Notable works: Hwyl

Ifor Owen (3 July 1915 – 22 May 2007) was a Welsh educator who was notable for writing, illustrating and publishing Hwyl, the first children's comic book in the Welsh language.

== Life history ==
Owen was born in Cefnddwysarn, a small village near Bala in Wales in 1915. He was educated at the Boys' Grammar School in Bala and then Bangor Normal College. He trained at Bangor to be a teacher specialising in art and science; though initially he wanted to specialise in art, but was persuaded against it by his father, who believed the subject was 'only for girls'. At the age of 21 he gained a position as headmaster of a primary school at Croesor remaining there until 1948. From 1948 until 1954 he was headmaster of a school in Gwyddelwern, and then from 1954 to 1976 he became the headmaster of Ysgol O.M. Edwards in Llanuwchllyn. He was married to Winifred, who died before him, and together had three children. Owen died in Dolgellau in 2007.

== Career as an illustrator and editor ==
Owen began illustrating while teaching in his first headship in Croesor, after the school was shut after an outbreak of measles. The first book he illustrated was Yr Hen Wraig Bach a'i Mochyn (The little old lady and her pig) (1946), which began a demand for his work from Welsh publishers. In 1949, he and DJ Williams, published Hwyl (Fun), the first children's comic in the Welsh language. As well as running the comic, Owen wrote and illustrated many of the strips. He created several characters for the comic, including Defi John and Tomi Puw, Meri Ann, Prisila Puw and Pero Bach. Hwyl ran from 1949 until 1989, selling roughly 8,000 copies per issue.

As a child, Owen had been an early member of Urdd Gobaith Cymru, a Welsh youth movement, and as an adult he helped by designing and illustrating many of their publications. Owen was seen as one of the few people who tried to bring a professional quality to illustrations for children in Wales, and took great pride in his work.

== Awards and honours ==
Owen was awarded many times for his contributions to Welsh culture. In 1961 he was invested in the White Robe Order of Gorsedd y Beirdd. In the 1977 National Eisteddfod of Wales, held in Wrexham, he was awarded the Syr T H Parry Williams Medal by the contribution to Welsh culture; and in 1985 he became the first recipient of the Mary Vaughan Jones Award, for his contribution to the field of children's books in Wales.

He was awarded an honorary MA by the University of Wales in 1997, for his service to Welsh culture and his contributions to Urdd Gobaith Cymru.

== See also ==
- Welsh comics
