= Thomas Charles Edwards =

Welsh minister, writer and academic (1837–1900)

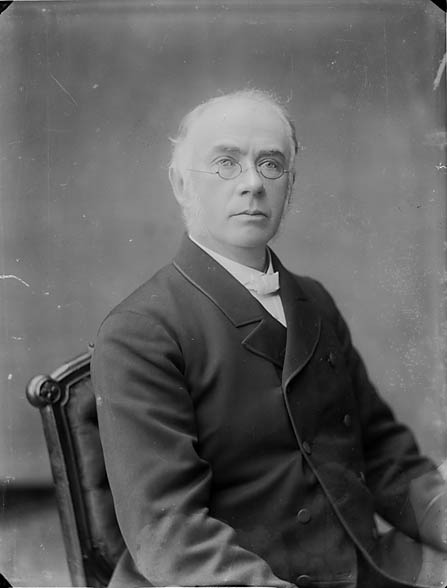
Portrait photograph by John Thomas, c. 1885

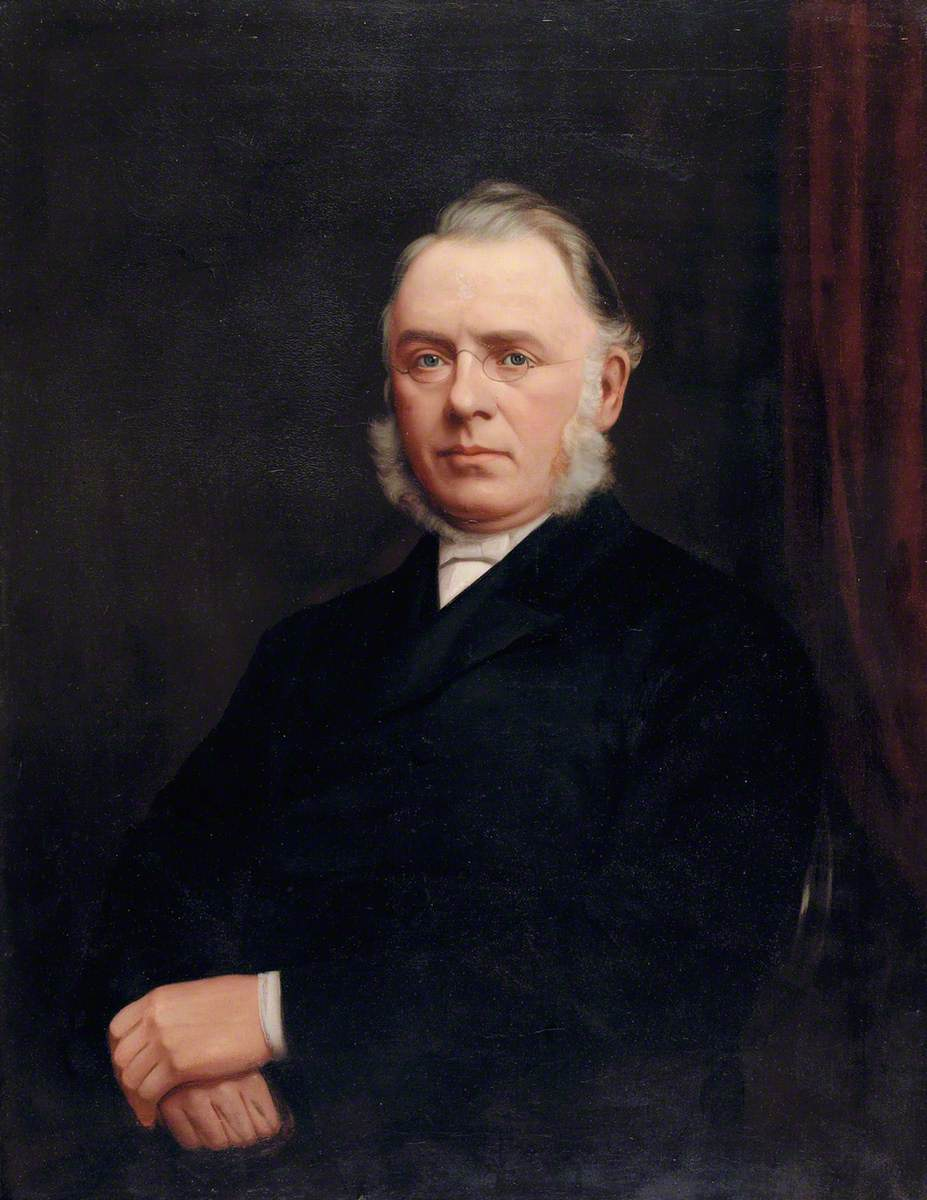
Portrait c. 1890

Thomas Charles Edwards (22 September 1837 – 22 March 1900) was a Welsh minister, writer and academic who was the first Principal of the University College of Wales, Aberystwyth.

== Life ==
Thomas Charles Edwards was born at Llanycil, Bala, Merionethshire, on 22 September 1837. Edwards was the son of Lewis Edwards, founder of the Bala Theological College. His mother was a granddaughter of Thomas Charles, the organiser of Welsh Calvinistic Methodism.

He was educated at his father's college in Bala, at St Alban Hall, Oxford and at Lincoln College, Oxford. At Oxford he was deeply influenced by Mark Pattison and Benjamin Jowett, and kept in touch with them for the rest of their lives.

He began preaching with the Presbyterian Church of Wales in 1856, and his resolve to become a minister was deepened by the revival of 1858–1859. In 1867 he became minister of the Windsor Street chapel in Liverpool, and later of the Catherine Street chapel in the same city. He was accounted one of the leading preachers of his generation.

In 1872 the new university at Aberystwyth was founded, and Edwards was appointed as the first principal. The college was opened with a staff of three professors and twenty-five students in October 1872, and for some years its career was chequered enough. Edwards, however, proved a skilful manager, and his hold on the affection of the Welsh people enabled him to raise the college to a high level of efficiency. When it was destroyed by fire in 1885 he collected £25,000 to rebuild it; the remainder of the necessary £40,000 being given by the government (£10,000) and by the people of Aberystwyth (£5,000).

Edwards resigned from the university post in 1891, partly for health reasons and partly to follow his father as head of the Bala Theological College. He was also Moderator of the General Assembly of the Presbyterian Church in 1887.

He married Mary Roberts in 1876; they had four children.

He was weakened by a stroke in 1894, but continued to work until he died at Bala on 22 March 1900.

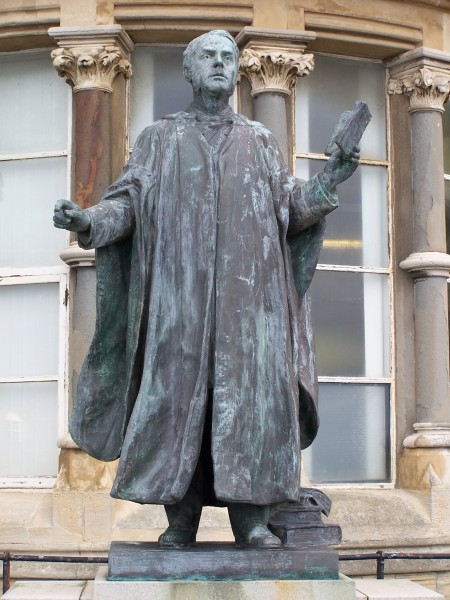
Sculpture by Goscombe John

== Publications ==
- Edwards, Thomas Charles (1885). A commentary on the First Epistle to the Corinthians. London: Hodder and Stoughton. Two editions in 1885. US publication of second edition: New York City: A. C. Armstrong & Son (1886)
- — (1885). "A Sermon". In Jones (ed.). Welsh Pulpit. ISBN 9780665293351.
- — (1887). Memoir of his father, Lewis Edwards.
- — (1888). The Epistle to the Hebrews. London: Hodder and Stoughton. Nine editions up to 1904. Also published by: New York City: A. C. Armstrong & Son, Toronto: Willard Tract Depository & Bible Depot
- — (1890). Yr Epistol at yr Hebreaid [The Epistle to the Hebrews] (in Welsh). Caernafon: D. W. Davies.
- — (1895). The God-Man. London: Hodder and Stoughton. (Davis Lecture)
- — (1901). Bywyd a Llythyrau y Diweddar Barch Lewis Edwards [Life and Letters of the Late Rev. Lewis Edwards] (in Welsh). Liverpool: Isaac Foulkes. (About his father)

He also published individual sermons.

== Statue at Aberystwyth University ==
A statue of Thomas Charles Edwards was unveiled in July 1922 in the forecourt of University College of Wales, Aberystwyth. The sculptor was Goscombe John.

== Awards ==
- Honorary Doctor of Divinity, University of Edinburgh (1887)
- Honorary Doctor of Divinity, University of Wales (1898)
