= Joseph Hughes (Baptist) =

English Baptist minister

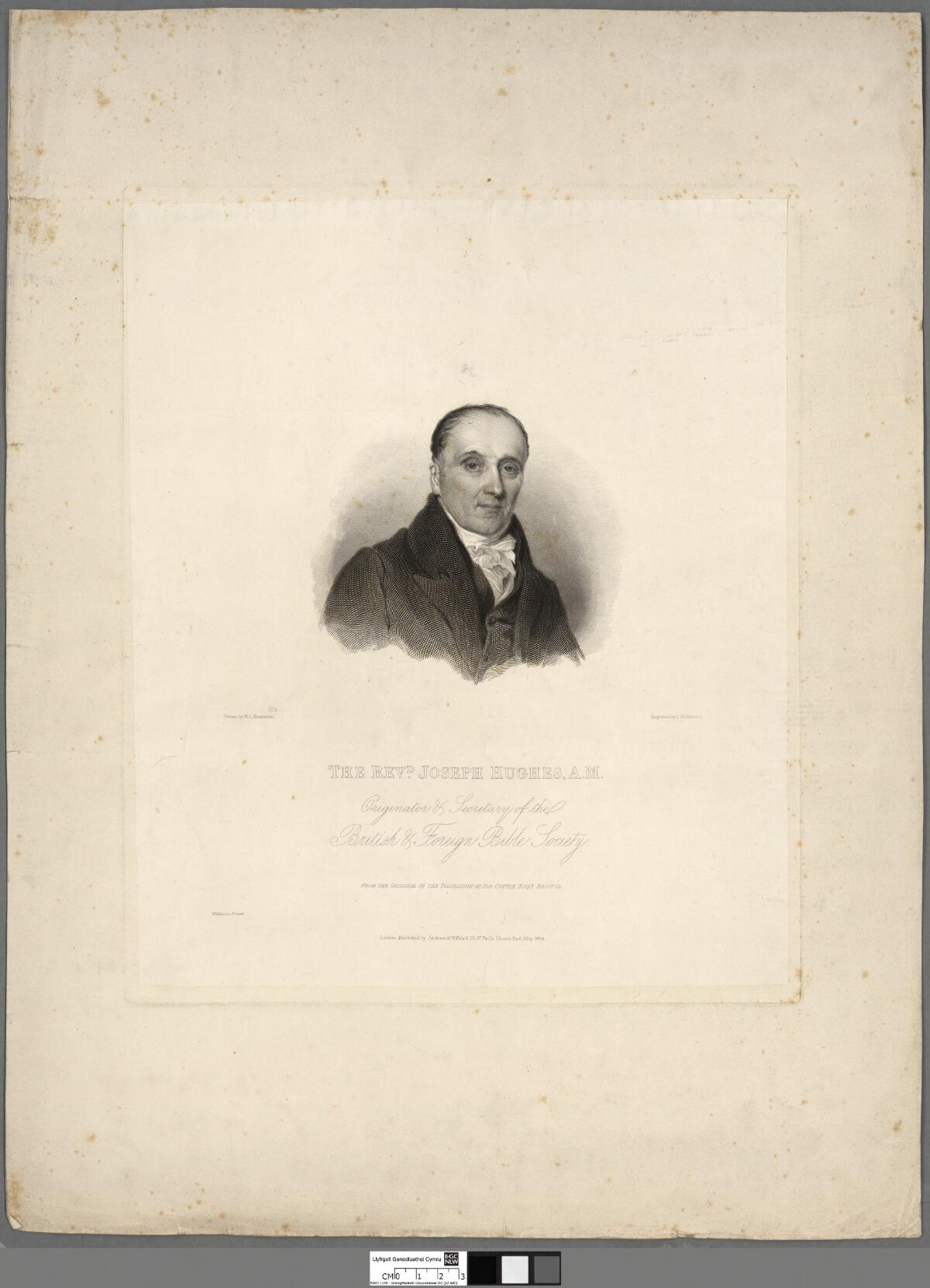
Joseph Hughes

Joseph Hughes (1769–1833) was an English Baptist minister, best known for his role as a founder of the British and Foreign Bible Society.

== Early life ==
He was born in Holborn, London to Thomas Hughes and his wife Sarah Brier, a Baptist. In a large family, many died young, and Joseph as an infant was put out to nurse at Enfield Chase.

When young, Hughes was sent from his family in London as boarder at the school run in Darwen, Lancashire by the Presbyterian minister Robert Smalley, in 1778. From there he moved in 1780 to Rivington, and the grammar school run by John Norcross. His father died when he was ten. He was baptised in London in 1784, by Samuel Stennett. From this point his education was supported by the Trust of John Ward, set up for young Dissenters, Baptists preferred, aged from 14 to 18. Through Stennett, Hughes went first to the Bristol Baptist Academy in 1794, and then in 1787 to King's College, Aberdeen, where he graduated M.A, in 1790. He then spent a short period at Edinburgh University.

In 1791 Hughes became a classics tutor, and assistant to Caleb Evans, at the Bristol Baptist Academy. Evans died shortly afterwards. Hughes then ran the academy, for a year and a half. Among his pupils there was John Foster. Hughes at this period joined the social circle of Joseph Cottle, beginning a long friendship.

== Minister at Battersea ==
John Ryland became minister at Broadmead Baptist Church at the end of 1793, and the contrast of styles with the careful Hughes in the end undermined Hughes's position in Bristol. Through Stennett and the Little Wild Street Baptist congregation he led, Hughes found that he could run a church in the old Battersea Chapel, founded 1736. (Battersea was then a village south of London, in Surrey. Hughes had work done to expand the chapel, and moved there in 1796–7.

Robert Aspland, another Ward Trust scholar, came to study with Hughes in 1797–8. In 1799 Foster joined Hughes in Battersea, to help educate a group of 20 Sierra Leoneans brought from Africa by John Campbell, and originally destined for Scotland.

Hughes drew from the story of Mary Jones and her Bible, circulated by Thomas Charles, the need for a Bible society with global reach and multilingual ambitions. He is quoted as saying "If Wales, why not the world?" When the British and Foreign Bible Society was formed in 1804, the three secretaries were Hughes, the Anglican priest John Owen (1766–1822) and Charles Francis Steinkopff, the foreign secretary.

A memoir by John Leifchild appeared in 1835.

== Works ==
- The Excellence of the Holy Scriptures: An Argument for Their More General Dispersion at Home and Abroad (1803). Published form of a position paper by Hughes, arguing the case for a Bible society.
- The Believer's Prospect and Preparation (1831), sermon on the death of Robert Hall.
