= Llidiardau =

Coordinates: 52.9292°N 3.67471°W

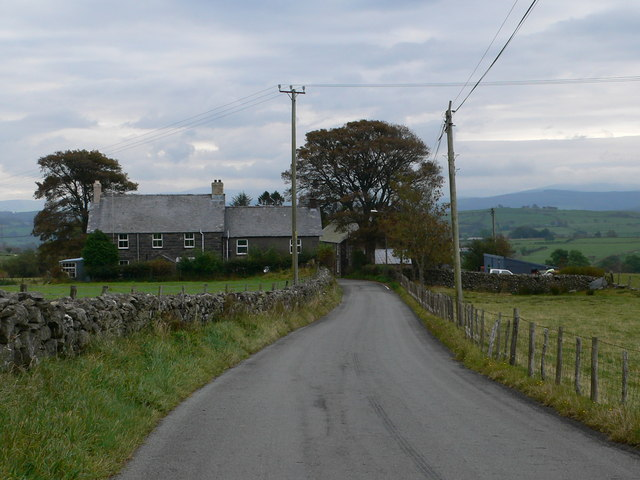

- Location within Gwynedd
- Population: 20 (2011)
- OS grid reference: SH875381
  - Cardiff: 144.6 miles
- Community: Llanycil
- Principal area: Gwynedd
- Country: Wales
- Sovereign state: United Kingdom
- Post town: BALA
- Postcode district: LL23
- Dialling code: 01678
- Police: North Wales
- Fire: North Wales
- Ambulance: Welsh
- UK Parliament: Dwyfor Meirionnydd
- Senedd Cymru – Welsh Parliament: Dwyfor Meirionnydd

Llidiardau is a small hamlet in Gwynedd, North Wales, approximately 4 miles northwest of Bala, on an unnamed road, 2.3 miles from Arenig Fawr and in the shadow of Mynydd Nodol. The community population taken at the 2011 census was 20.

== Llidiardau Chapel ==
Llidiardau Chapel was built in 1811 by the Calvinistic Methodists and enlarged in 1831. In 1860 it was rebuilt into its present form, aside from modifications in 1900. It is a Grade II listed building owing to its good state of preservation. Services are no longer held here, and are instead conducted at Talybont chapel, just over a mile and a half away in Rhyd-uchaf.

== Governance ==
Llidiardau is within the electoral ward of Llandderfel and the parish of Llanycil.
