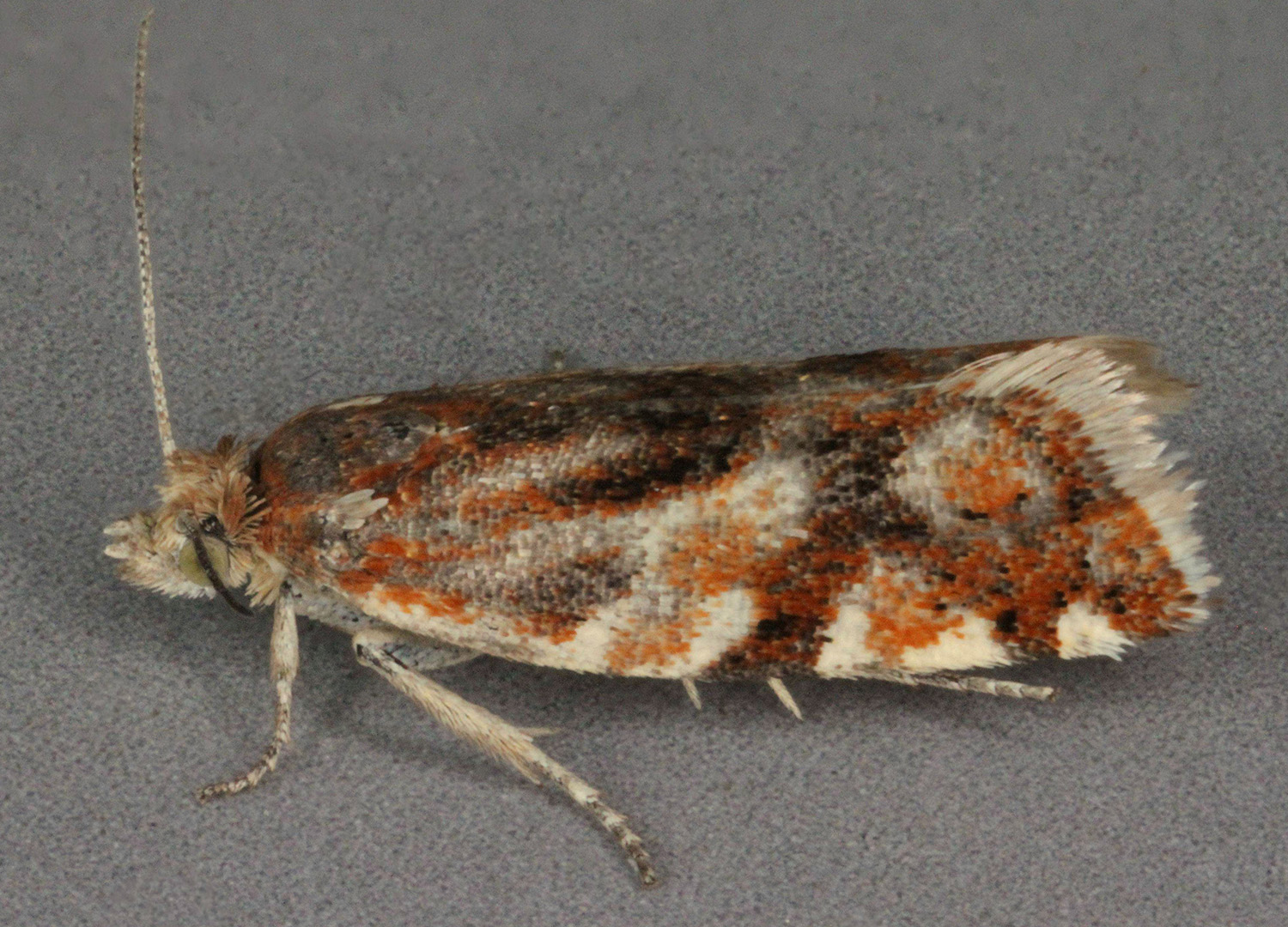
- Epinotia mercuriana, Cwm Cywarch, North Wales

Scientific classification
- Kingdom: Animalia
- Phylum: Arthropoda
- Class: Insecta
- Order: Lepidoptera
- Family: Tortricidae
- Genus: Epinotia
- Species: E. mercuriana

Binomial name
- Epinotia mercuriana (Frölich, 1828)

Synonyms
- Tortrix mercuriana Frölich, 1828; Coccyx monticolana Duponchel, in Godart, 1842

= Epinotia mercuriana =

Species of moth

Epinotia mercuriana is a moth of the family Tortricidae. It is found in most of Europe (except Iceland, the Benelux, Denmark, the Czech Republic, Hungary, the Iberian Peninsula, Ukraine, the Baltic region, and the Balkan Peninsula), east to the eastern part of the Palearctic realm.

The wingspan is about 11–14 mm. The forewings are very narrow and ferruginous in colour; The basal patch has a very oblique edge. The central fascia, and the terminal fascia are furcate on the costa and rather dark ferruginous - fuscous, edged with leaden-metallic striae which become whitish on the costa. The hindwings are grey. The larva is grey-green; head palebrown; plate of 2 grey.

Adults are on wing from July to September. They are often found in the afternoon and in the early evenings.

The larvae feed on various low-growing moorland plants, including Calluna and Vaccinium myrtillus. They spin together leaves or shoots and feed within.
