= Thomas Charles =

Welsh Nonconformist clergyman

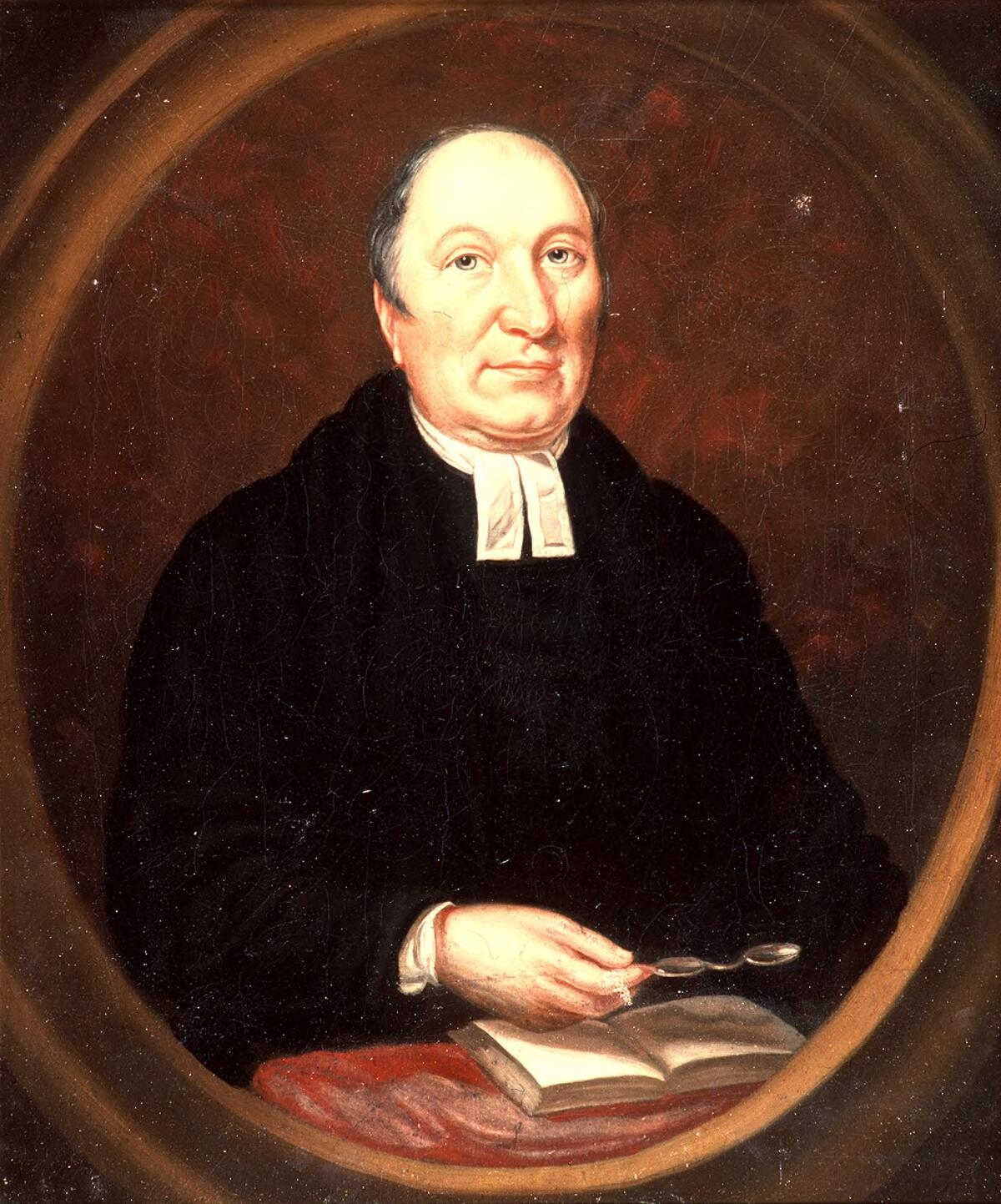
- Portrait by William Roos (1808–1878)
- Born: 14 October 1755; Llanfihangel Abercywyn, Carmarthenshire, Wales
- Died: 5 October 1814 (aged 58); Bala, Wales
- Relatives: David Charles (brother)

Thomas Charles (born Oct. 14, 1755, Pantdwin, near St. Clears, Carmarthenshire, Wales—died Oct. 5, 1814, Bala, Merionethshire) was a Welsh religious leader, a founder of Calvinistic Methodism in Wales and an inspirer of missionary activities.

== Early life ==
Charles was born in the parish of Llanfihangel Abercywyn, near St Clears, Carmarthenshire, the son of Rees and Jael Charles, and the older brother of hymn-writer David Charles. He was educated for the Anglican ministry at Llanddowror and Carmarthen, and at Jesus College, Oxford (1775–1778). In 1777 he studied theology under the evangelical John Newton at Olney. He was ordained deacon in 1778 on the title of the curacies of Shepton Beauchamp and Sparkford, Somerset; and took priests orders in 1780. He afterwards added to his charge at Sparkford, Lovington, South Barrow and North Barrow, and in September 1782 was presented to the perpetual curacy of South Barrow by John Hughes, Coln St Denys. Charles did not leave Sparkford until he resigned all his curacies in June 1783, and returned to Wales, marrying (on 20 August) Sarah Jones of Bala, the orphan of a flourishing shopkeeper.

== Methodist sympathies ==
Charles had been influenced by the great revival movement in Wales, and at the age of seventeen had been converted by a sermon of Daniel Rowland. This was enough to make him unpopular with many of the Welsh clergy, and being denied the privilege of preaching for nothing at two churches, he helped his old Oxford friend John Mayor, now vicar of Shawbury, Shropshire, from October until 11 January 1784. On 25 January he took charge of Llanymawddwy (14 miles from Bala), but was forced to leave after three months, because three influential people, including the rector of Bala, had persuaded his rector to dismiss him. His preaching, his catechizing of the children after evensong, and his connection with the Bala Methodists, his wife's stepfather being a Methodist preacher, gave great offence. After a fortnight more at Shawbury, he wrote to John Newton and another clergyman friend in London for advice. The Church of England denied him employment, and the Methodists desired his services. His friends advised him to return to England, but it was too late. In September, accompanied by Henry Newman (his rector at Shepton Beauchamp and Sparkford), he went on a tour in Caernarfonshire. In December, he was preaching at the Bont Uchel Association; and he joined the Methodists in 1784.

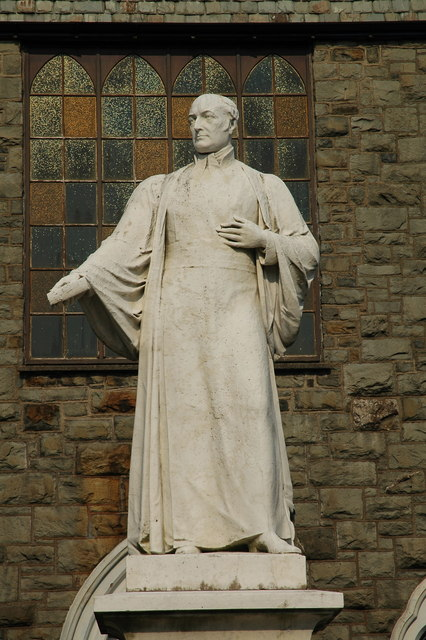
Statue of Charles by William Davies (Mynorydd) outside Capel Tegid, Bala

== Schools ==
Before taking this step, he had been in the habit of gathering the poor children of Bala into his house for instruction, and soon there were so many that he had to use the chapel. This was the origin of the Welsh Circulating Schools, which he developed on the lines adopted by Griffith Jones (died 1761), formerly vicar of Llanddowror. First one man was trained for the work by Charles himself, then he was sent to a district for six months, where he taught the children and young people reading and Christian principles. Writing was added later. The expenses were met by collections made in the Calvinistic Methodist Societies, and as the funds increased masters multiplied, until in 1786 Charles had seven masters to whom he paid £10 per annum; in 1787, twelve; in 1789, fifteen; in 1794, twenty. By this time the salary had been increased to £12; in 1801 it was £14.

He had learned of Robert Raikes's Sunday Schools before he left the Establishment, but he preferred his own system. He gave six days tuition for every one given by them, and many people not only objected to working as teachers on Sunday, but thought that the children forgot in the six days what they learnt on the one. Sunday Schools were first adopted by Charles in the case of young people in service who could not attend during the week, and even in that form much opposition was shown to them because teaching was thought to be a form of Sabbath breaking. His first Sunday School was in 1787. William Wilberforce, Charles Grant, John Thornton and his son Henry, were among the philanthropists who contributed to his funds; in 1798 the Sunday School Society (established 1785) extended its operations to Wales, making him its agent, and Sunday Schools grew rapidly in number and favour. A powerful revival broke out at Bala in the autumn of 1791, and his account of it in letters to correspondents, sent without his knowledge to magazines, kindled a similar fire at Huntly. The scarcity of Welsh Bibles was Charles's greatest difficulty in his work. John Thornton and Thomas Scott helped him to secure supplies from the Society for the Promotion of Christian Knowledge from 1787 to 1789, when the stock became all but exhausted. In 1799 a new edition was brought out by the Society, and he managed to secure 700 copies of the 10,000 issued; the Sunday School Society got 3000 testaments printed, and most of them passed into his hands in 1801. It was in 1800 that a 15-year-old girl, Mary Jones, walked 26 miles from her home to obtain one of his Bibles, and she was seen as a shining example of religious devotion, an inspiration to Charles and his colleagues.

== Welsh Bibles project ==
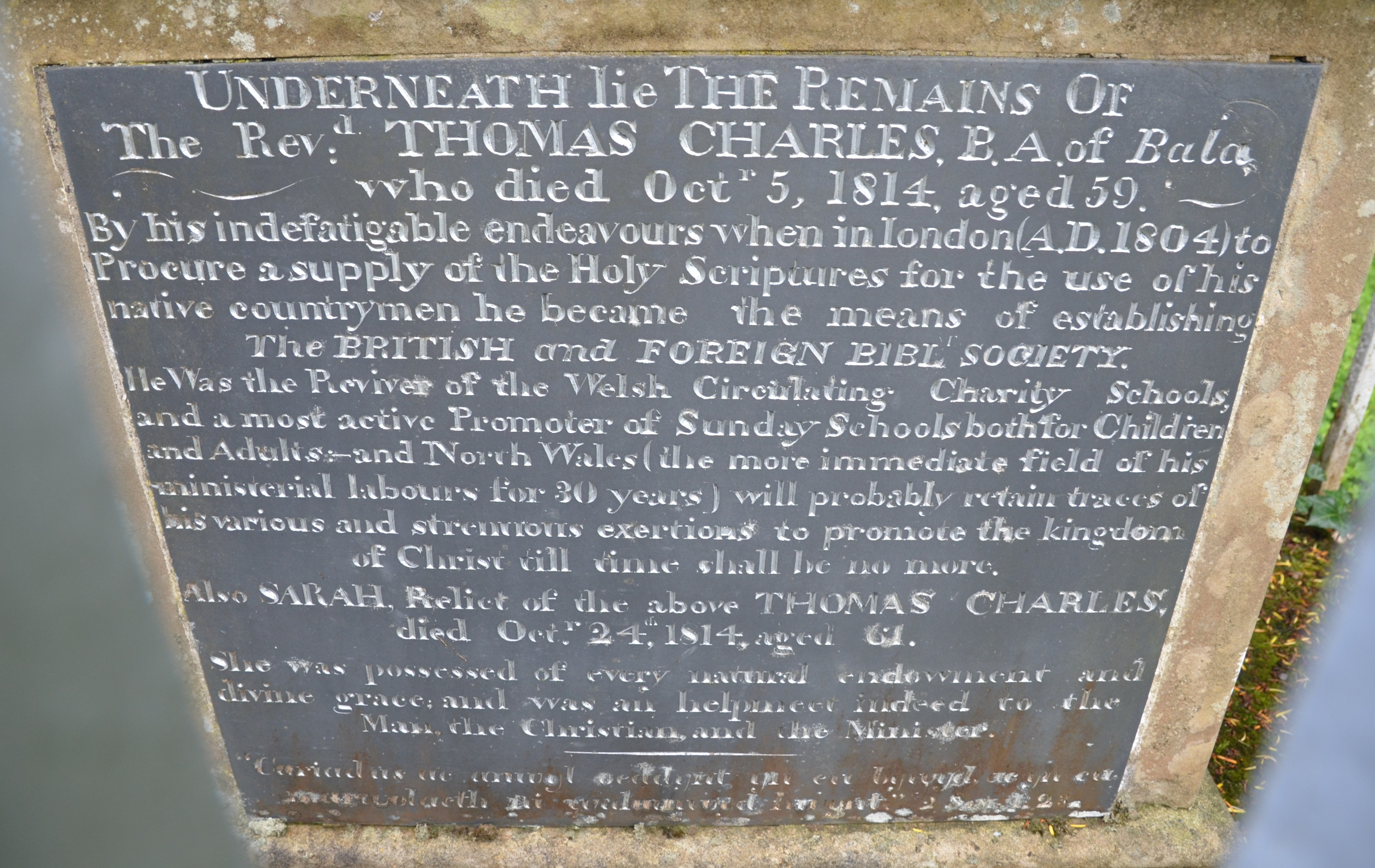
Epitaph of Thomas Charles and his widow

In 1800, when a frostbitten thumb gave him great pain and much fear for his life, his friend, Philip Oliver of Chester, died, leaving him director and one of three trustees over his chapel at Boughton; and this added much to his anxiety. The Welsh causes at Manchester and London, too, gave him much uneasiness, and burdened him with great responsibilities at this juncture. In November 1802 he went to London, and on 7 December he sat at a committee meeting of the Religious Tract Society, as a country member, when his friend, Joseph Tarn, a member of the Spa Fields and Religious Tract Society committees, introduced the subject of a regular supply of Bibles for Wales. Charles impressed the committee with his arguments in favour. When he visited London in 1803, his friends were ready to discuss the name of a new Society, whose sole object should be to supply Bibles. Charles returned to Wales on 30 January 1804 and the British and Foreign Bible Society was formally and publicly inaugurated on 7 March. The first Welsh testament issued by that Society appeared on the 6 May 1806, the Bible on the 7 May 1807, both being edited by Charles.

Between 1805 and 1811 he issued his Biblical Dictionary in four volumes, which still remains the standard work of its kind in Welsh. Three editions of his Welsh catechism were published for the use of his schools (1789, 1791 and 1794); an English catechism for the use of schools in Lady Huntingdon's Connection was drawn up by him in 1797; his shorter catechism in Welsh appeared in 1799, and passed through several editions, in Welsh and English, before 1807, when his Instructor (still the Connectional catechism) appeared. From April 1799 to December 1801 six numbers of a Welsh magazine called Trysorfa Ysprydol (Spiritual Treasury) were edited by Thomas Jones of Mold and himself; in March 1809 the first number of the second volume appeared, and the twelfth and last in November 1813.

== Later life ==
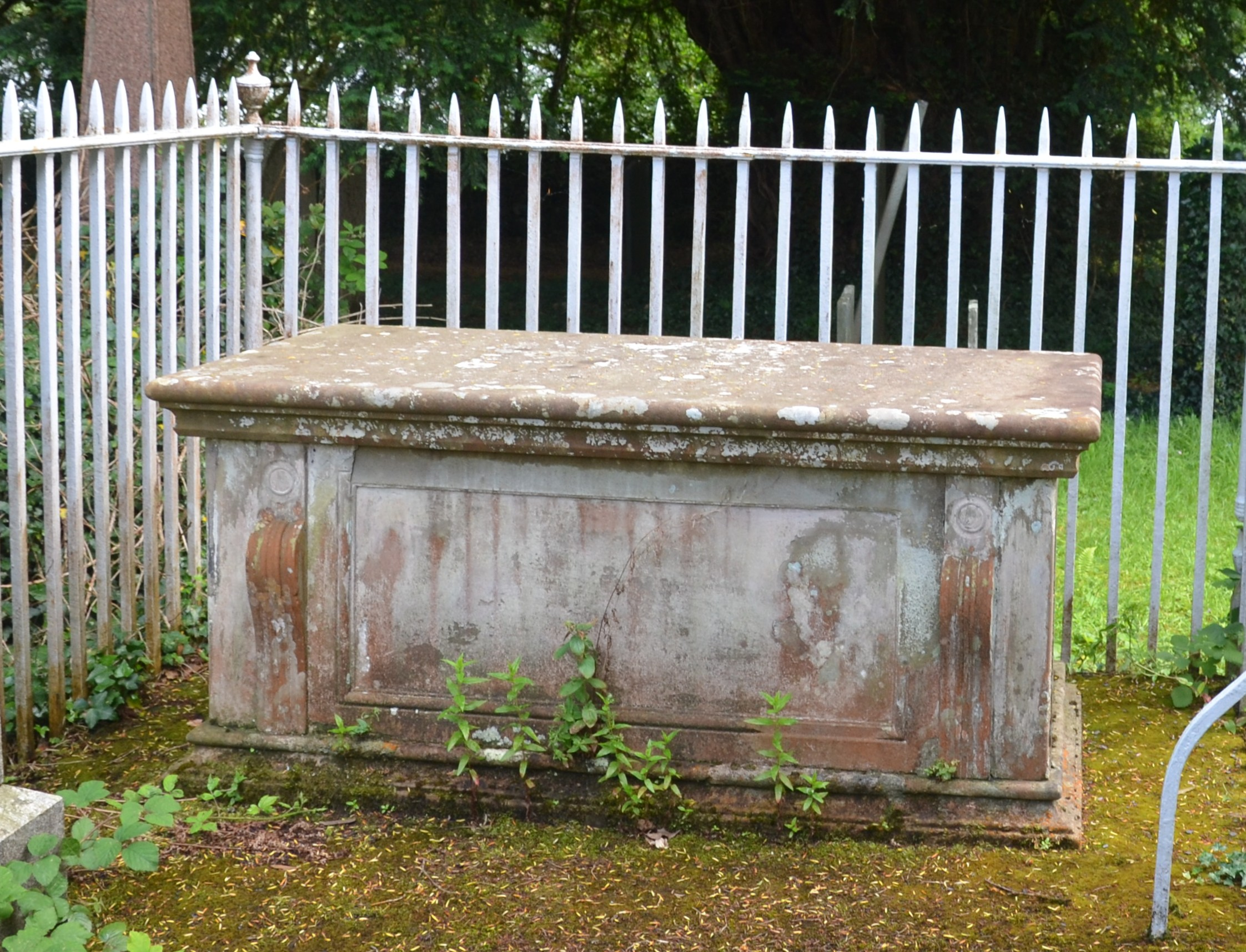
The tomb of Thomas Charles in the churchyard of St Beuno's church, now Canolfan Pererin Mary Jones Pilgrim Centre, Llanycil

The London Hibernian Society asked him to accompany David Bogue, Joseph Hughes, and Samuel Mills to Ireland in August 1807, to report on the state of Protestant religion in the country. Their report is still extant, and among the movements initiated as a result of their visit was the Circulating School system. In 1810, owing to the growth of Methodism and the lack of ordained ministers, he led the Connection in the movement for connectionally ordained ministers, and his influence was the chief factor in the success of that important step. From 1811 to 1814 his energy was mainly devoted to establishing auxiliary Bible Societies. By correspondence he stimulated some friends in Edinburgh to establish charity schools in the Highlands, and the Gaelic School Society (1811) was his idea. His last work was a corrected edition of the Welsh Bible issued in small pica by the Bible Society.

Charles died, "worn down by his activities" according to biographer Edwin Welch, in October 1814, nine days before his 59th birthday, and was buried at nearby Llanycil. His widow, who had retired from business in 1810, died two weeks later, aged 61.

As a preacher he was in great request, though possessing but few of the qualities of the popular preacher. All his work received very small remuneration; the family was maintained by the profits of a business managed by Mrs Charles a keen, active and good woman. His influence is still felt, and he is rightly claimed as one of the makers of modern Wales.

His great-grandson was Thomas Charles Edwards (1837–1900), the first principal of the University College of Wales, Aberystwyth.
