= Robert Aspland =

English Unitarian minister, editor and activist

Robert Aspland (13 January 1782 – 30 December 1845) was an English Unitarian minister, editor and activist. To be distinguished from his son Robert Brook Aspland (1805-1869).

== Life ==
Aspland was the son of Robert Aspland and his second wife, Hannah Brook. He was born at Wicken, Cambridgeshire, 13 January 1782. He attended Soham Grammar School where his relative John Aspland taught. In 1794, he was placed first at Islington, then at Highgate, and in August 1795 was sent to Well Street, Hackney, under John Eyre, where he stayed till summer 1797.

In April 1797 Aspland was publicly baptised at the Baptist chapel in Devonshire Square, and awarded a Ward scholarship at the Bristol Academy by the Baptist ministry. He was placed under Joseph Hughes, then residing at Battersea with a small Baptist congregation. Staying only a few months, but long enough to give his tutor reasons for doubting his views on doctrine, Aspland went home to Wicken in the summer of 1798, becoming popular there as the boy-preacher, and reached Bristol on 31 July to find himself assigned to Dr. Ryland, the theological tutor. He proceeded in due course, October 1799, to Marischal College, Aberdeen; but, his opinions becoming more and more manifest, he was excised from membership at the chapel at Devonshire Square 29 October 1800, and he quit the university and relinquished his scholarship at the same moment.

=== Lay preacher and editor ===
Aspland at this juncture was offered a share in a trade. He knew a prosperous dealer in artists' colours in St. Martin's Lane, London, whose daughter, Sara Middleton, he afterwards married; and taking a part in his future father-in-law's business in the week, he devoted his Sundays to preaching for any London preacher in want of sudden help. Amongst the pulpits thus opened to him was that of the General Baptists (otherwise Unitarians) in Worship Street, City; the pastor of this church, the Rev. John Evans, recommended him to the General Baptists at Newport, Isle of Wight, then unprovided with a minister; Aspland visited them 17 April 1801, and was requested to remain. His marriage followed in May; he became secretary to the South Unitarian Society in 1803; he published a sermon, entitled ‘Divine Judgments,’ in 1804; and he left Newport February 1805 to take charge of a larger congregation at Norton, Derbyshire. Passing through London on his way there, however, he was invited to be minister at the Gravel Pit chapel, Hackney; and going to Derbyshire to be honourably released from his engagement there, he returned to Hackney for 7 July 1805, taking possession on that day of a pulpit which he retained for forty years.

Aspland established, or aided in the establishment of, several Unitarian periodicals and societies. The first of these was the Monthly Repository. This contained biographical sketches, theological disquisitions, political criticism, etc. This Aspland edited, and he had the opening number ready for February 1806. In the same month he was instrumental in establishing the Unitarian Fund, with himself as secretary. He took an additional secretaryship in 1809, when he succeeded in forming the Christian Tract Society. In 1810 he brought out A Selection of Psalms and Hymns for Unitarian Worship, used subsequently in his own chapel, though not without some opposition. In 1811 he became one of the trustees of Dr. Daniel Williams's charities, and was active in opposing the alteration of the Toleration Act. In 1812 he was a member of the committee of the Protestant Society for the Protection of Religious Liberty, being one of a deputation, which had an interview with the Prime Minister Spencer Perceval 11 May, only two hours before he was shot.

In 1813 Aspland set up the Hackney Academy at Durham House for training unitarian ministers; he was helping also, by letters and sermons delivered and printed, in the agitation for an act to relieve from penalties persons who impugn the doctrine of the Holy Trinity. The Doctrine of the Trinity Act 1813 (53 Geo. 3. c. 160) received royal assent 21 July. In 1814 Aspland brought out ‘British Pulpit Eloquence,’ and some sermons of his own. In 1815 he established the Christian Reformer, or New Evangelical Miscellany, a work the editorship of which he never gave up. In July 1817 he formed the Non-con Club at his own house, Thomas Noon Talfourd, Southwood Smith, William Johnson Fox, and Walter Wilson being among the members. On 18 December of the same year he was at William Hone's side in the Court of King's Bench, Guildhall, finding authorities and furnishing hints for his six hours' speech of defence; he had previously visited Hone in prison, providing him with books from Dr Williams's Library, so that the defence might be prepared.

=== Founding of the British and Foreign Unitarian Association ===
In 1818 Aspland was compelled by ill-health to give up his Unitarian academy and the secretaryship of the Unitarian Fund. On his recovery in 1819, he brought about the formation of the Association for protecting the Civil Rights of Unitarians; and that being the year of the conviction of Richard Carlile for publishing Tom Paine's The Age of Reason, Aspland was engaged in controversy on the subject in the columns of The Times. In 1821 he became trustee of the Presbyterian Fund, and drew up the Christians' petition to parliament against the prosecution of unbelievers, sending it all over the country for signature, till it was presented to parliament, 1 July 1823, by Joseph Hume. In 1825 Aspland worked at the fusion of the three societies, the Unitarian Association, the Unitarian Fund, and the Unitarian Book Society, into one body, the British and Foreign Unitarian Association. In 1826 he broke off his connection with the Monthly Repository after an unremunerative editorship of twenty-one years; and in 1827 he edited the Test Act Reporter till, on the bill for the repeal of the Corporation and Test Acts passing, 9 May 1828, the publication was no longer needed. Aspland also presented and read an address to the throne on 28 July 1830, and another on the accession of Queen Victoria in 1837.

He was also secretary to the British and Foreign Unitarian Association from 1835 to 1841, and retained the acting editorship of the Christian Reformer till 1844. His health beginning to fail in 1843, he was provided with an associate in his pastorate. On 4 February 1844 he preached for the last time, and after being confined to his house for many months, he died 30 December 1845, aged 63. Aspland published sermons, a Catechism, Prayers, Tracts for the People, and other works, a complete list of which is given in his Memoirs.

== Legacy ==
His papers are held at Harris Manchester College, Oxford.
