= Bala Town Hall =

Municipal Building in Bala, Wales

- Neuadd y Dref Y Bala (Welsh)
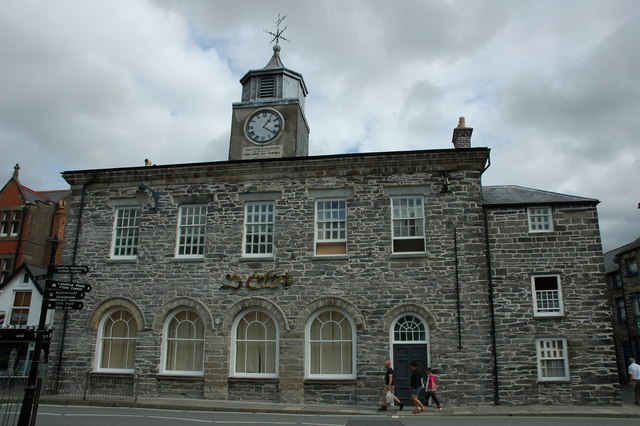
- Bala Town Hall

- Shown in Gwynedd
- 52.9105°N 3.5983°W
- Location: High Street, Bala

History
- Built: c.1800

Site notes
- Architectural style: Georgian style

Listed Building – Grade II
- Official name: Town Hall
- Designated: 21 September 1964
- Reference no.: 4916

Bala Town Hall (Welsh: Neuadd y Dref Y Bala), known in the late 19th century as the County Hall (Welsh: Neuadd y Sir Y Bala), is a municipal building in Bala, Gwynedd, Wales. The structure, which is now used as a restaurant, is a Grade II listed building.

== History ==
The first municipal building in the town was a burgess court, probably on the same site, which dated back to the 13th century. The Court of Great Sessions in Wales, which was established in 1542, met in the building regularly, and Welsh interludes i.e. plays, probably written by the great Welsh playwright, Twm o'r Nant, were performed there in 1789.

After the original structure became dilapidated in the late 18th century, the burgesses commissioned a new building. It was designed in the Georgian style, built in rubble masonry and was completed in around 1800. It was arcaded on the ground floor, so that markets could be held. The design involved a broadly symmetrical main frontage with five bays facing onto the High Street; the openings on the ground floor were all fitted with voussoirs and the right hand opening, which was shorter and narrower than the others, was fitted with a doorway with a fanlight, and gave access to the staircase up to the first floor. The first floor was fenestrated by sash windows with architraves and, at roof level, there was a moulded cornice. Internally, the principal rooms were the market hall on the ground floor and the courtroom on the first floor.

The Court of Great Sessions continued to meet in the courtroom until the court was abolished in 1830. The building continued to serve in a judicial capacity as the venue for the courts of assize, with the justices alternating their weekly hearings between Dolgellau and Bala. A small clock tower, erected in honour of John Jones of Tremynfa, who had served as the local manager of the National Provincial Bank, was installed on the roof in 1868. The borough council, which had been long extinct, was formally abolished under the Municipal Corporations Act 1883. The town was instead designated as a local government district in 1859, governed by a local board. Such districts were reconstituted as urban districts in 1894.

A public meeting was convened in the town hall by the High Sheriff of Merionethshire, Edward Evans-Lloyd, for the purpose of preparing an address to Queen Victoria on the occasion of her Golden Jubilee in 1887. Local masonic meetings also took place in the building with Lord Harlech performing the role of principal guest there in 1888. A meeting was also convened to consider the arrangements for Queen Victoria's Diamond Jubilee in 1897.

Civic celebrations organised by the urban district council included the centenary of the birth of the locally born politician and leader of Cymru Fydd, Thomas Ellis, in 1959. The building served as a civic meeting place for the urban district council for much of the 20th century but became surplus to requirements after the enlarged Meirionnydd District Council was formed in 1974. The building was sold to a private investor and went on to operate as a restaurant named Y Cwrt (English: The court) with a private residence on the first floor.
