= Abertrinant =

Coordinates: 52.628°N 4.011°W

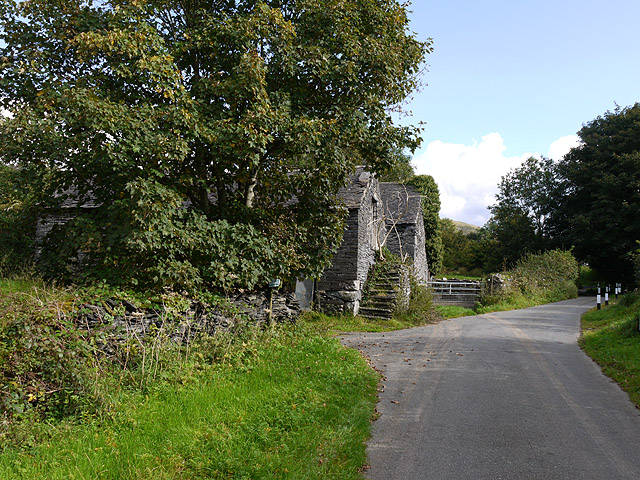
- Old farm buildings at Tyddyn-y-berllan

- Location within Gwynedd
- OS grid reference: SH639052
- Community: Llanfihangel-y-Pennant
- Principal area: Gwynedd
- Preserved county: Gwynedd
- Country: Wales
- Sovereign state: United Kingdom
- Post town: TYWYN
- Postcode district: LL36
- Dialling code: 01654
- Police: North Wales
- Fire: North Wales
- Ambulance: Welsh
- UK Parliament: Dwyfor Meirionnydd
- Senedd Cymru – Welsh Parliament: Gwynedd Maldwyn

Abertrinant is a small settlement in Gwynedd, Wales. It is 7 kilometres (4 mi) northeast of the town of Tywyn.
