= Mary Jones World =

Heritage centre in Gwynedd, Wales

Coordinates: 52°54′01″N 3°36′54″W

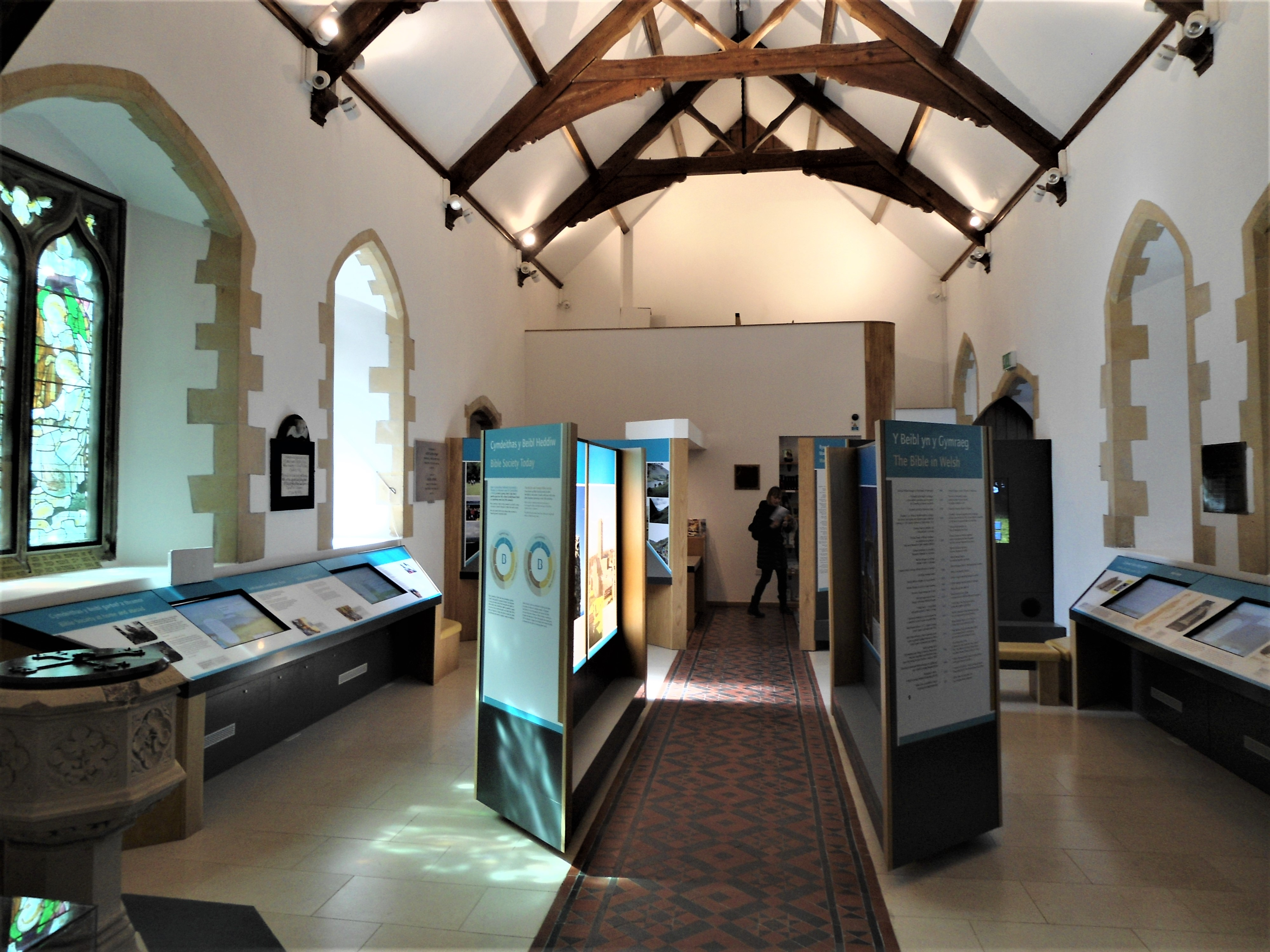
The exhibition in 2019

Mary Jones Pilgrim Centre, commonly known as Mary Jones World (Welsh: Byd Mary Jones), is a small heritage centre located in Llanycil near Bala, Gwynedd, Wales. Situated on the north shore of Llyn Tegid (Bala Lake), it provides information on Mary Jones, a fifteen-year-old girl from Llanfihangel-y-Pennant. After she had saved her money for six years, in 1800 Jones walked 26 miles to buy a copy of a Welsh-language Bible, which she thought would be available in Bala, only to find that they were sold out. The Reverend Thomas Charles was reputed to have given her his own spare copy. (Other versions of the story have Mary waiting for two days for Bibles to arrive, and Charles giving her three copies to take back to her village.)

The heritage centre is an initiative of the British and Foreign Bible Society and was opened on 5 October 2014 at a cost of £1.3 million in the former village church which was dedicated to Saint Beuno.

As well as information about Mary the centre tells about the growth of the Bible Society, and Thomas Charles who sold Mary her bible is buried in the church yard of St Beuno. School group visits are encouraged and there is a children's play area next to the centre.

The Centre reopened in March 2024 after a period of refurbishment under the new name of Canolfan Pererin Mary Jones Pilgrim Centre.
