= Welsh-language comics =

- Languages: English; Welsh

Related articles

The first Welsh-language comic was Ifor Owen's Hwyl which ran from 1949 to 1989.

Other Welsh-language comics include Hebog (founded 1968), Llinos (1972), Sboncyn (1980s), Penbwl (1989) and Wcw.

Mellten, founded in 2016, is a quarterly children's comic created by Huw Aaron and published by Y Lolfa. It features work by Jac Jones, Ben Hillman, Joe Watson, Alexander Matthews and Wilbur Dawbarn.

The first Welsh-language graphic novel was Pelydr-Ll, published by Y Lolfa, and created by Elwyn Ioan and Gareth Miles.

Y Mabinogi is a graphic novel adaptation of the 2003 film, which is in turn based on the classic Welsh tales known as The Mabinogion. It was written by Wales-based writer/artist Mike Collins.

Seren a Sbarc yn Achub (Cwpan) y Bydysawd is a comic-format children's book created by Elidir Jones and Huw Aaron, and published by Llyfrau Broga Books

Gwil Garw a'r Carchar Crisial is a 2021 children's graphic novel written and illustrated by Huw Aaron, and published by Llyfrau Broga Books.
