= Mary Jones and her Bible =

Welsh Christian tale

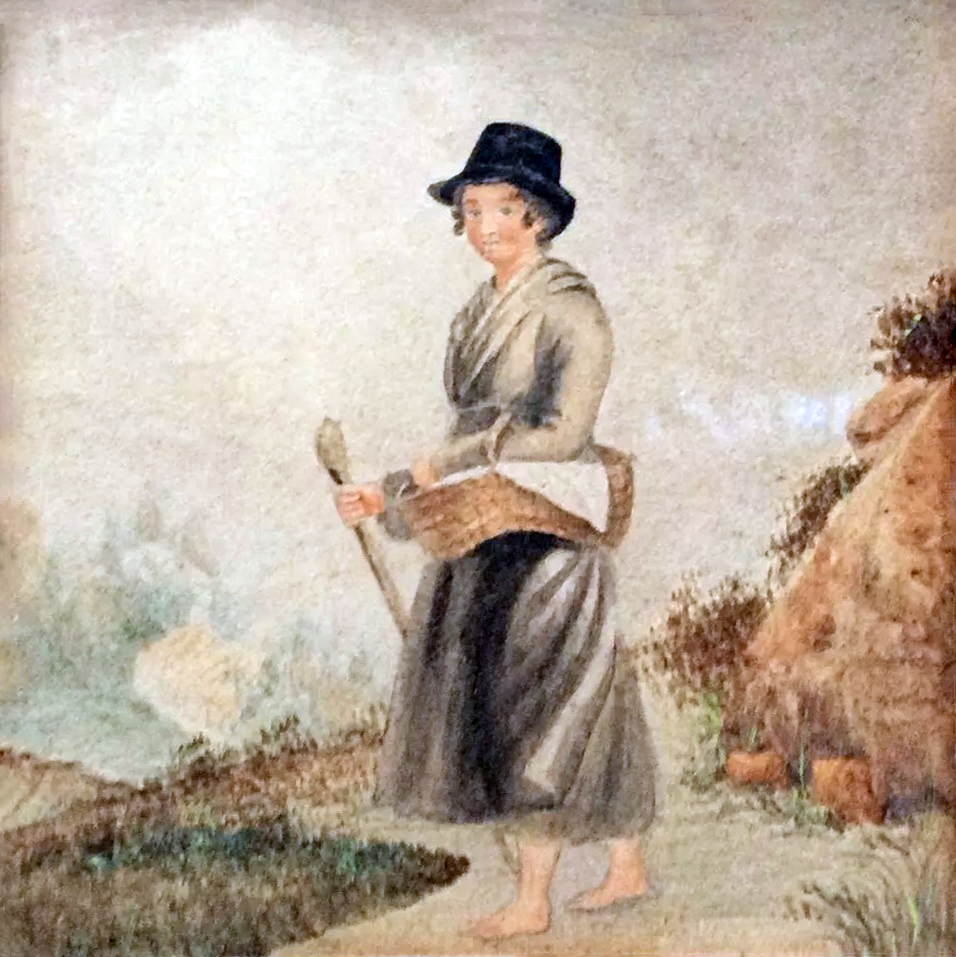
A watercolour painting of Mary Jones, painted between 1800 & 1840

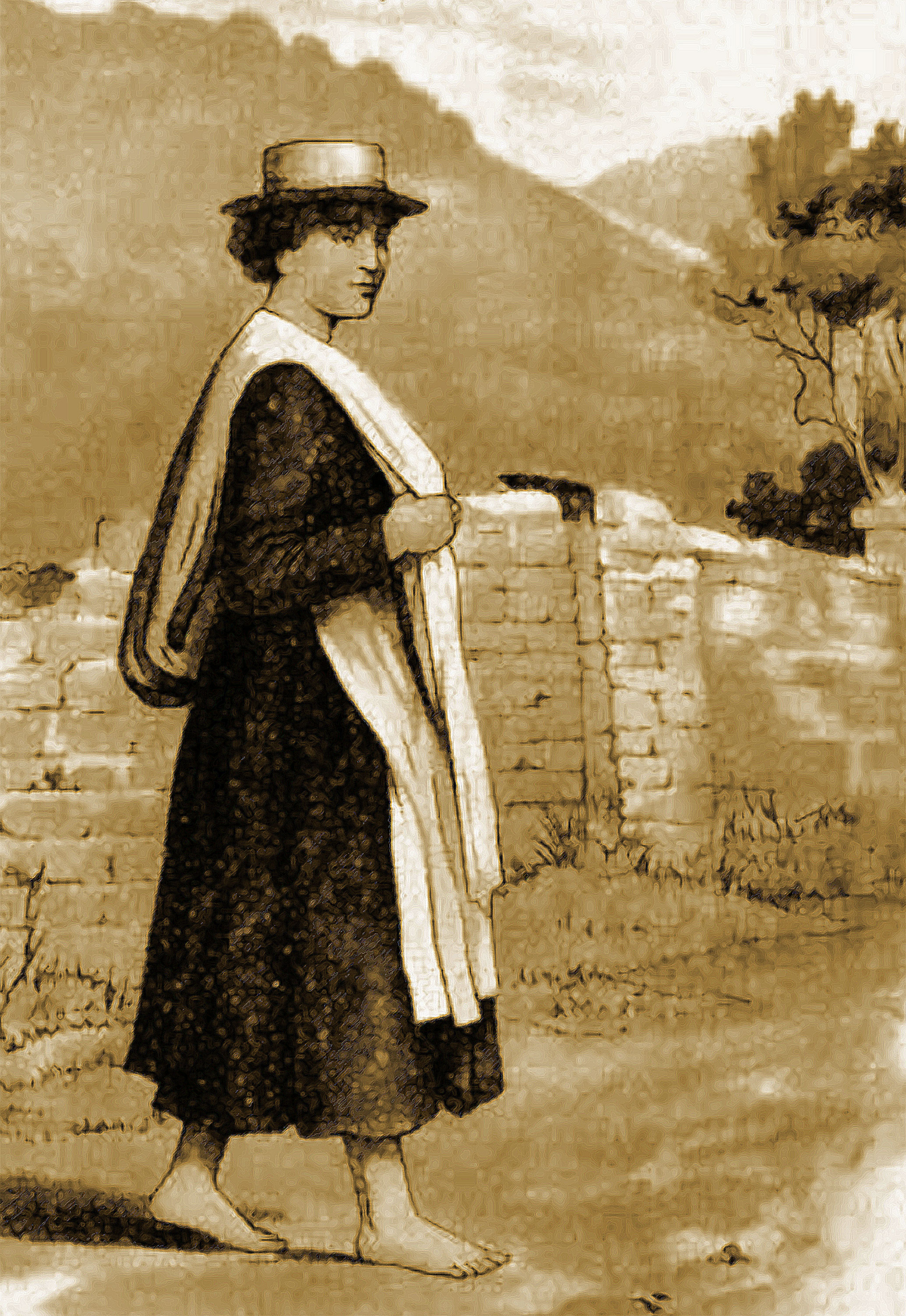
Illustration of Mary Jones (1897)

The story of Mary Jones and her Bible inspired the founding of the British and Foreign Bible Society. Mary Jones (16 December 1784 – 28 December 1864) was a Welsh girl who, at the age of fifteen, walked twenty-six miles barefoot across the countryside to buy a copy of the Welsh Bible from Thomas Charles because she did not have one. Thomas Charles then used her story in proposing to the Religious Tract Society that it set up a new organisation to supply Wales with Bibles.

Together with the Welsh hymnwriter Ann Griffiths (1776–1805), Mary Jones had become a national icon by the end of the nineteenth century, and was a significant figure in Welsh nonconformism.

== Journey ==
Beibl i bawb o bobl y byd!
("A Bible for everybody in the world!")

— Robert William of Pandy, Rhosygwalia

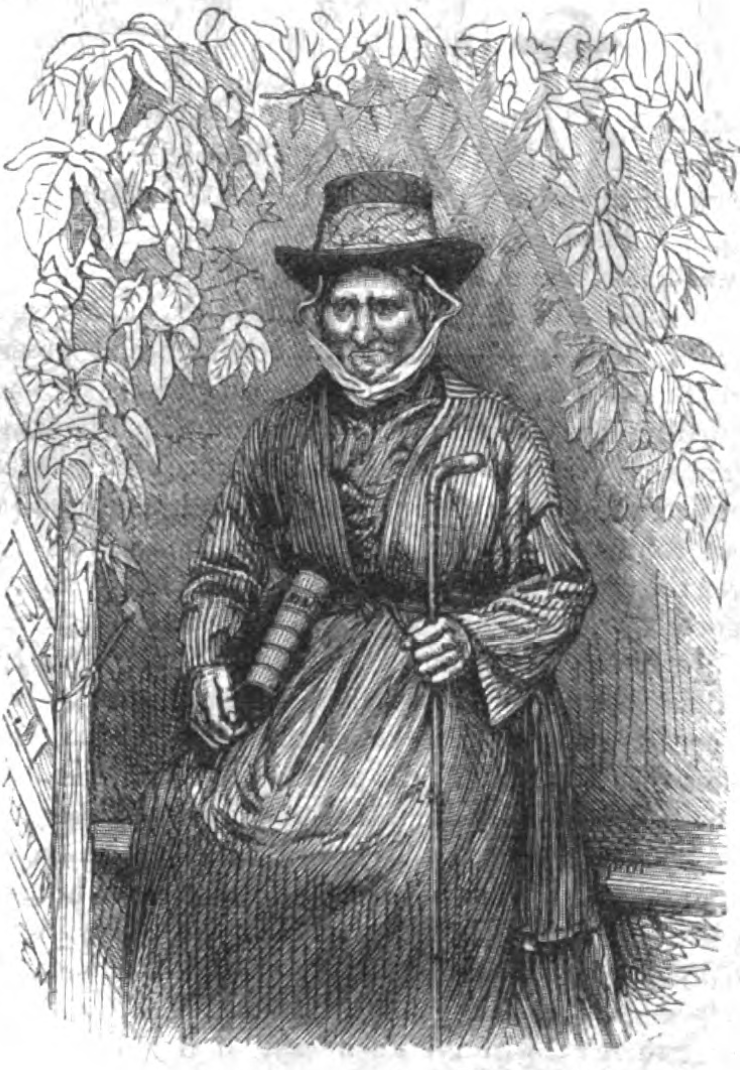
Mary Jones in her old age (engraving made from a photograph)

Mary Jones was from a poor family, the daughter of a weaver, who lived at Llanfihangel-y-Pennant, Abergynolwyn, at the foot of Cader Idris near Dolgellau. She was born in December 1784. Her parents were devout Calvinistic Methodists, called Jacob and Mary Jones. The Llanfihangel y Pennant Parish Register of Marriages records a marriage between a Jacob Jones and a Mary Jones on 25th May 1783. Mary Jones born 16th December 1784 herself professed the Christian faith at eight years of age. Having learned to read in the circulating schools organised by Thomas Charles, it became her burning desire to possess a Bible of her own. The nearest copy was at a farm two miles distant from her little cottage, and there was no copy on sale nearer than Bala – 26 miles (42 km) away; and it was not certain that a copy could be obtained there. Welsh Bibles were scarce in those days. Having saved for six years until she had enough money to pay for a copy, she started one morning in the Spring of 1800 for Bala, and walked the 26 miles over mountainous terrain, barefoot as usual, to obtain a copy from Thomas Charles, the only individual with Bibles for sale in the area. According to one version of the story, Charles told her that all of the copies which he had received were sold or already spoken for. Mary was so distraught that Charles spared her one of the copies which was already promised to another. In another version, she had to wait two days for a supply of Bibles to arrive, and was able to purchase a copy for herself and two other copies for members of her family. According to tradition, it was the impression that this visit by Mary Jones left upon him that impelled Charles to propose to the Council of the Religious Tract Society the formation of a Society to supply Wales with Bibles.

Mary later married a weaver named Thomas Jones. She died in 1864 aged 80 and was buried at the graveyard of Bryn-crug Calvinistic Methodist Chapel.

== The Bibles ==
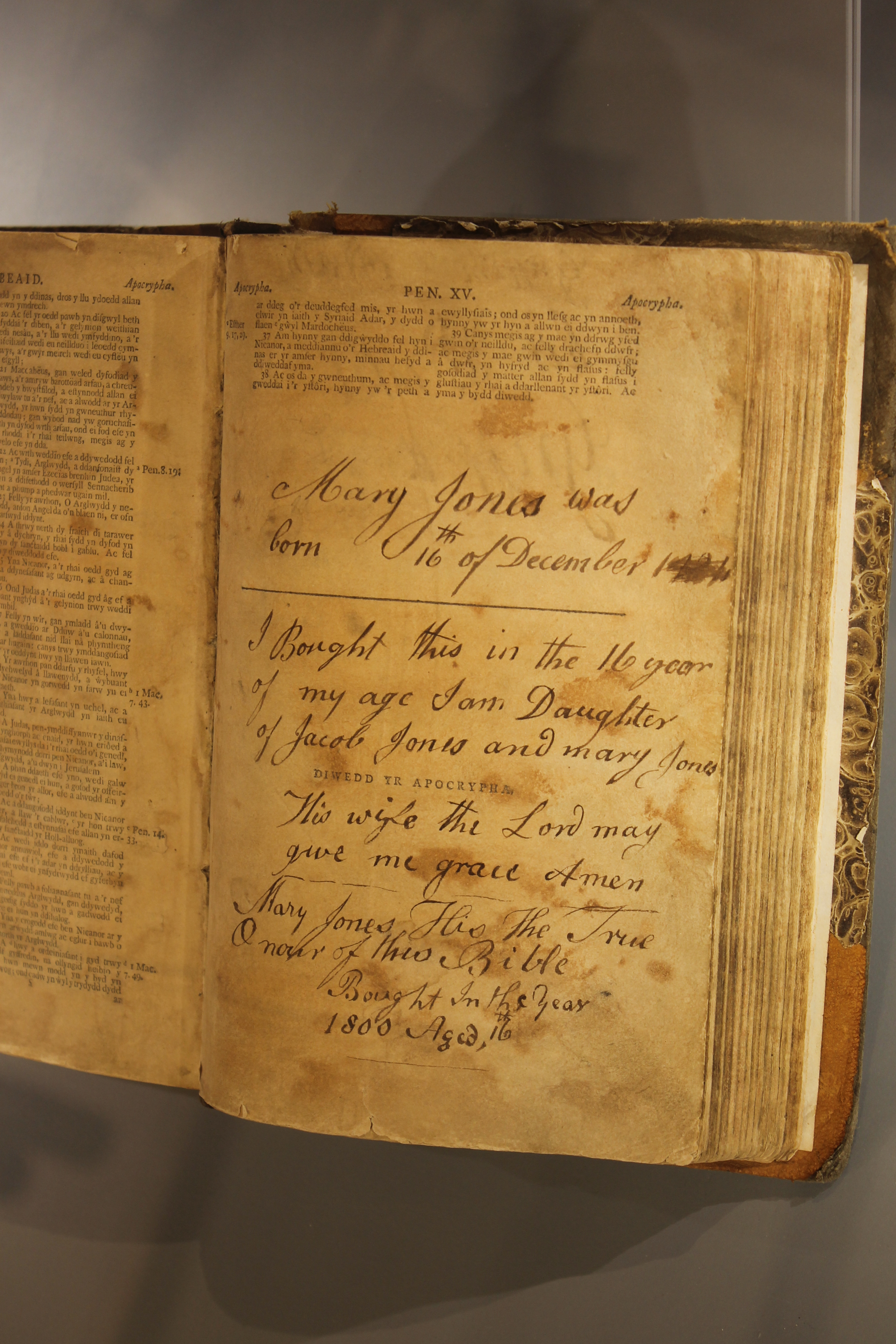
Mary Jones' Bible in Cambridge UL

Two of Mary Jones' Bibles are known, supporting the version of the story where she buys three books from Thomas Charles. One Bible is in the British and Foreign Bible Society's Archives in Cambridge University Library and one in the National Library of Wales. They are copies of the 1799 edition of the Welsh Bible, ten thousand copies of which were printed at Oxford for the Society for the Propagation of Christian Knowledge. In addition to the Old and New Testaments and the Apocrypha, the volume contains the Book of Common Prayer (in Welsh) and Edmwnd Prys's Welsh metrical Psalms.

In the copy now in Cambridge, Mary Jones wrote the following (in English) on the last page of the Apocrypha (spelling is her own):

Mary Jones was born 16th of December 1784.

I Bought this in the 16th year of my age. (Note: Her age was fifteen; "...in the sixteenth year of my age" means that she was in the year leading up to her sixteenth birthday.) I am Daughter of Jacob Jones and Mary Jones His wife. the Lord may give me grace. Amen.

Mary Jones His [is] The True Onour [owner] of this Bible. Bought In the Year 1800 Aged 16th.

The Cambridge copy of the Bible was exhibited in Bala for 3 days in March 2016.

== Published versions ==
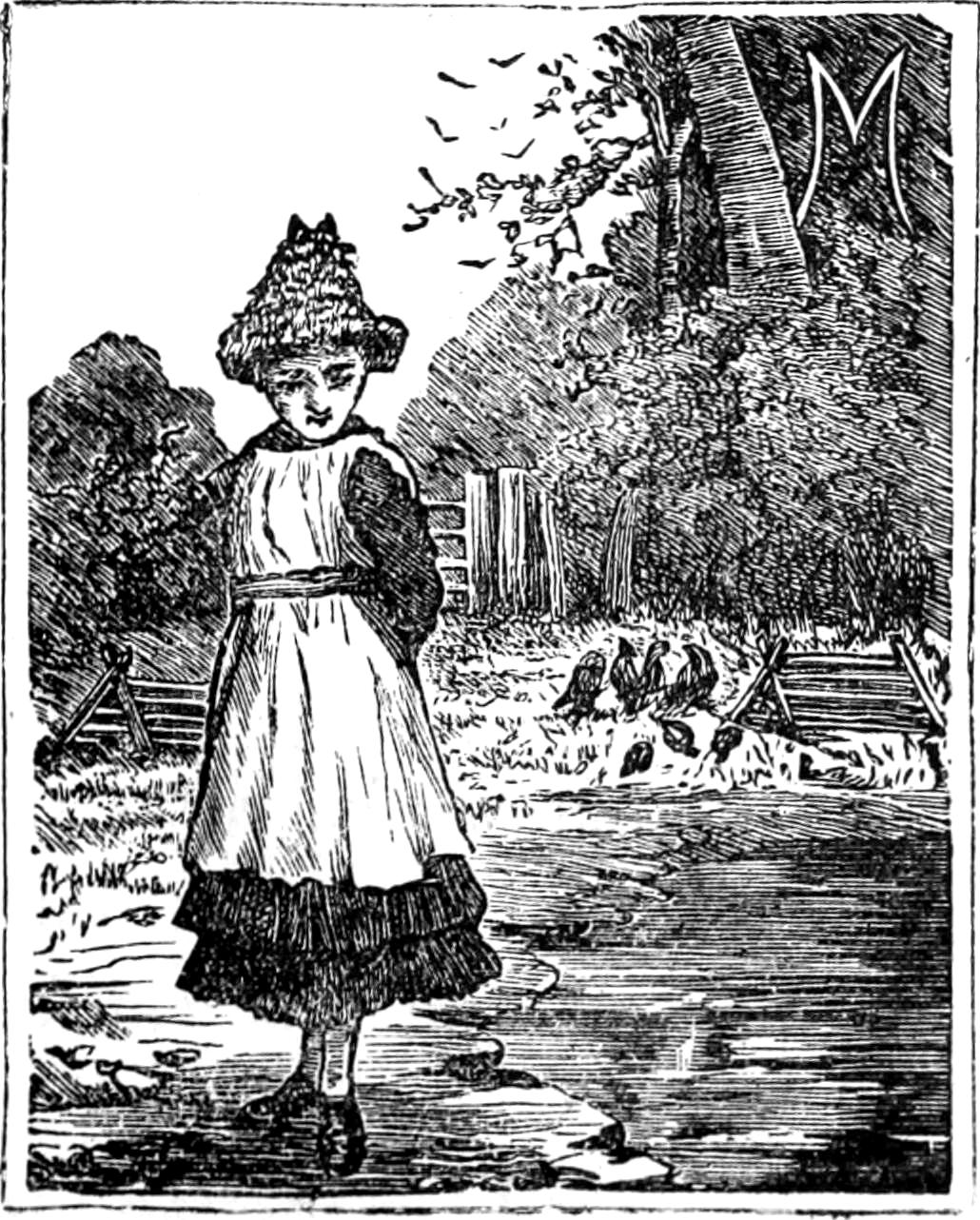
Mary Jones as a young girl walking to a farm to read the Bible, before she bought her own copy. Illustration from 1919 edition of The story of Mary Jones and her Bible

The story of Mary Jones was published in the 7 December 1878 edition of The Sunday at Home: a family magazine for Sabbath reading. Robert Oliver Rees told the story in his 1879 Welsh-language book Mary Jones, y Gymraes fechan heb yr un Beibl : a sefydliad y Feibl-Gymdeithas (Mary Jones, the Welsh girl without a Bible : The organisation of the Bible Society). In 1882 an English version of the story was published, The story of Mary Jones and her Bible by Mary Emily Ropes (credited as "M.E.R."). This was reprinted several times, was translated into Japanese, Māori and Russian and is still in print.

== Memorial in Llanfihangel-y-Pennant and legacy ==
Incised on front lower part of a memorial obelisk erected over the ruin of the cottage where she lived (near north end of Pont Ty'n-y-fach)is this inscription:

ER CÔF AM MARI JONES

YR HON YN Y FLWYDDYN 1800,
PAN YN 16 OED A GERDDODD O'R
LLE HWN I'R BALA, I YMOFYN BEIBL
GAN Y PARCH. THOMAS CHARLES, B.A.
YR AMGYLCHIAD HWN FU
YN ACHLYSUR SEFYDLIAD Y
GYMDEITHAS FEIBLAIDD
FRUTANAIDD A THRAMOR.

IN MEMORY OF MARY JONES, WHO IN
THE YEAR 1800, AT THE AGE OF 16 (Note: Her age is incorrectly stated as 16, rather than 15, on the memorial.) WALKED
FROM HERE TO BALA, TO PROCURE FROM THE
REVD. THOMAS CHARLES, B.A.
A COPY OF THE WELSH BIBLE, THIS INCIDENT
WAS THE OCCASION OF THE FORMATION OF
THE BRITISH AND FOREIGN BIBLE SOCIETY.

ERECTED BY THE SUNDAY SCHOOLS OF MERIONETH

Inscribed on the outer wall is 'Tyn y Ddol. Cartref Mari Jones' (in English: ‘The House in the Meadow. Home of Mary Jones’)

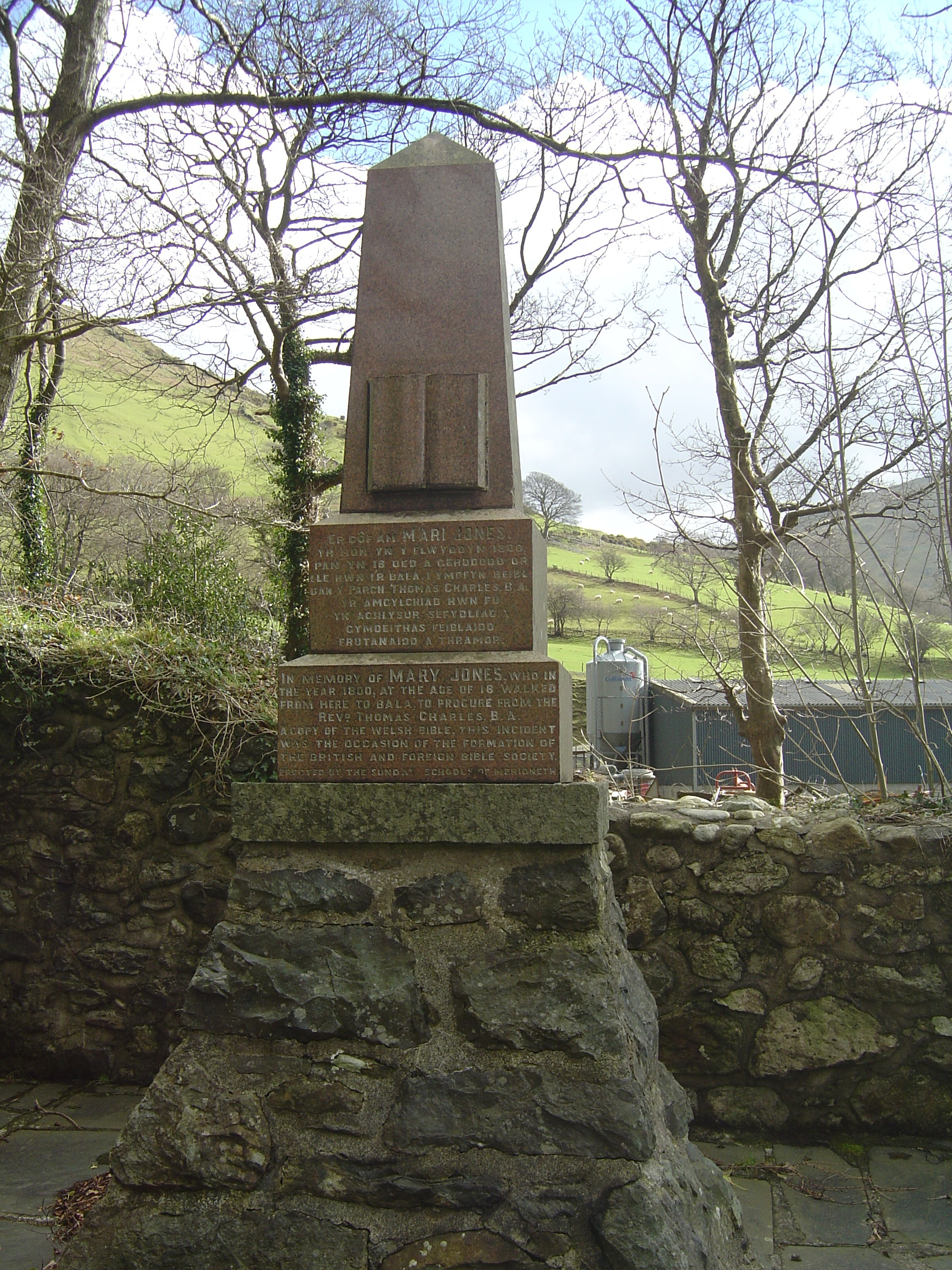
Memorial to Mary Jones

A "Mary Jones Walk" was held in the year 2000 to commemorate Mary's journey, and has been repeated several times. Mary Jones World is a heritage centre open in the summer months which tells her story.
