= Rhyd-uchaf =

Coordinates: 52.927086°N 3.637794°W

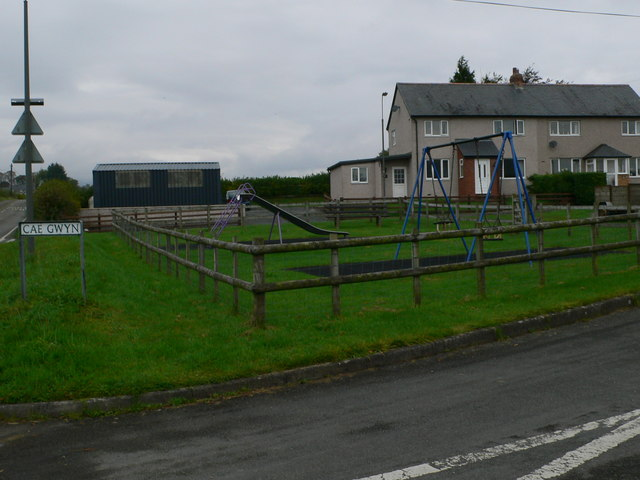
- Cae Gwyn, Rhyd-uchaf

- Location within Gwynedd
- Population: 78 (2011)
- OS grid reference: SH900378
  - Cardiff: 143.3 miles
- Community: Llanycil
- Principal area: Gwynedd
- Country: Wales
- Sovereign state: United Kingdom
- Post town: BALA
- Postcode district: LL23
- Dialling code: 01678
- Police: North Wales
- Fire: North Wales
- Ambulance: Welsh
- UK Parliament: Dwyfor Meirionnydd
- Senedd Cymru – Welsh Parliament: Dwyfor Meirionnydd

Rhyd-uchaf is a hamlet in Gwynedd, Wales, approximately 2.4 miles (3.9 km) northwest of Bala and 1.4 miles (2.3 km) south of Frongoch (by footpath), on an unnamed road which provides access to Arenig Fawr. The community population taken at the 2011 census was 78.

== Talybont Chapel ==
Talybont Chapel was built in 1837, with services held on behalf of the Presbyterian Church of Wales.

== Governance ==
Rhyd-uchaf is within the electoral ward of Llandderfel and the parish of Llanycil.
