= Llanfihangel-y-Pennant =

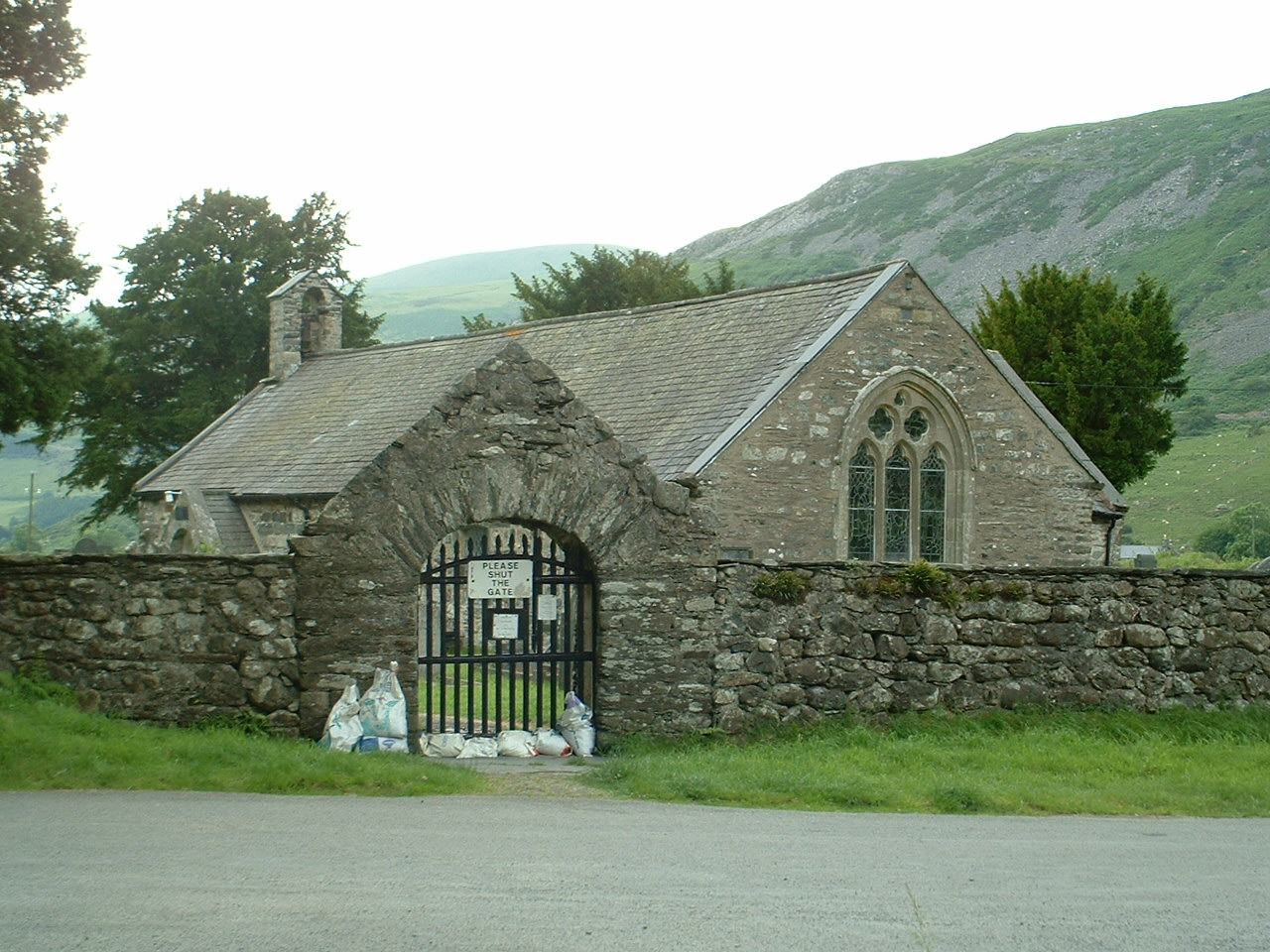
- St Michael's Church

- Location within Gwynedd
- Area: 77.5 km^{2} (29.9 sq mi)
- Population: 339 (2011)
  - Density: 4/km^{2} (10/sq mi)
- OS grid reference: SH671088
- Community: Llanfihangel-y-Pennant
- Principal area: Gwynedd
- Preserved county: Gwynedd
- Country: Wales
- Sovereign state: United Kingdom
- Post town: TYWYN
- Postcode district: LL36
- Dialling code: 01654
- Police: North Wales
- Fire: North Wales
- Ambulance: Welsh
- UK Parliament: Dwyfor Meirionnydd
- Senedd Cymru – Welsh Parliament: Dwyfor Meirionnydd
- List of places UK Wales Gwynedd 52.661°N 3.965°W Map of the community

Llanfihangel-y-Pennant is a hamlet and wider, very sparsely populated community (which includes Abergynolwyn and Tal-y-llyn) in the Meirionnydd area of Gwynedd in Wales. It is located in the foothills of Cadair Idris, and has a population of 402, reducing to 339 at the 2011 Census.

Nearby is the ruined castle of Castell y Bere, a stronghold of the Welsh princes of Gwynedd in the 13th century.

== History ==
In 1800, Mary Jones walked barefoot 26 miles (42 km) from the village to Bala to buy a Welsh Bible. This led to the formation of the British and Foreign Bible Society. Mary Jones World, a heritage centre about her life is located near Bala.
