= Llanycil =

Village in Gwynedd, Wales

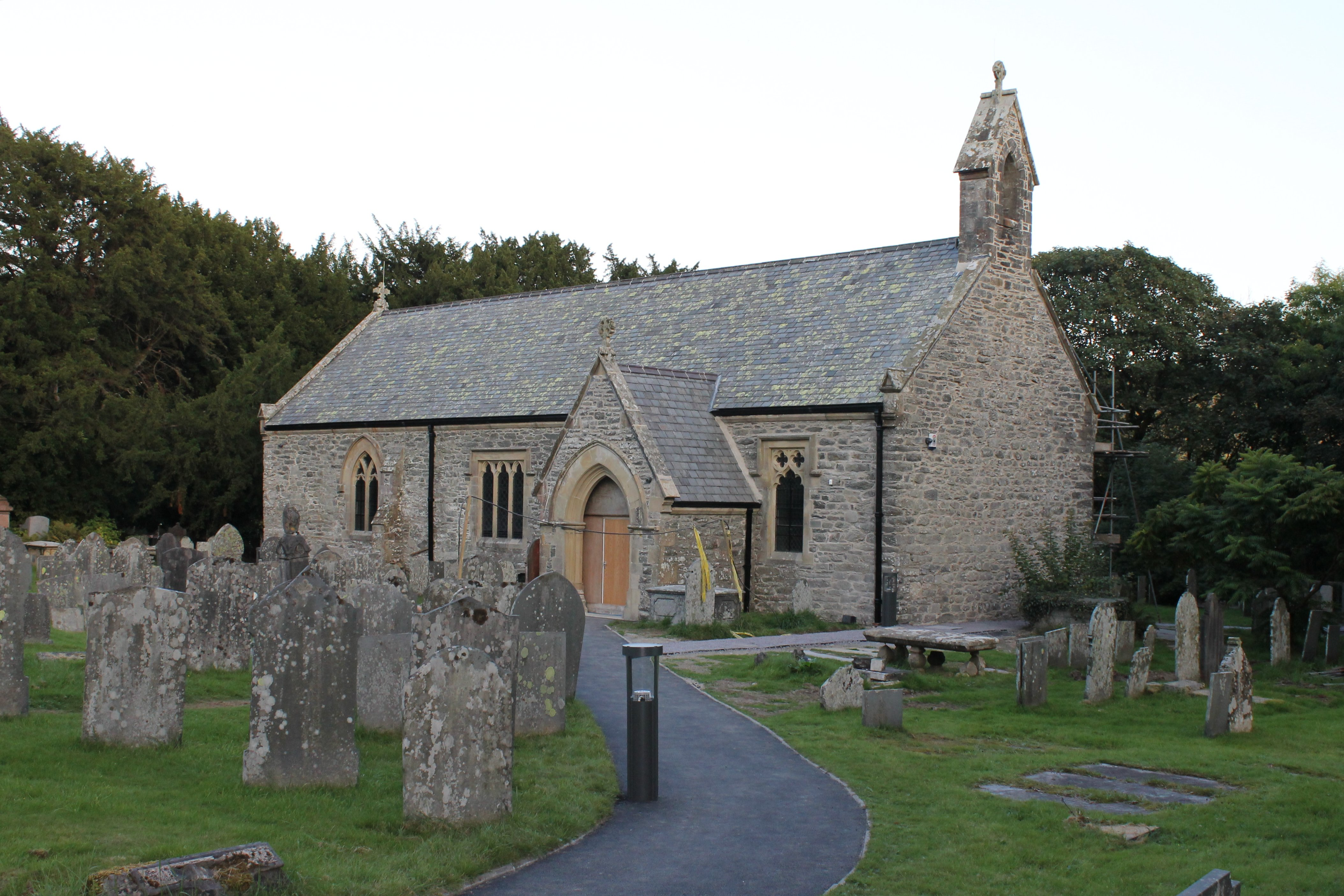
- St Beuno's Church, now Mary Jones World

- Location within Gwynedd
- Area: 83.51 km^{2} (32.24 sq mi)
- Population: 416
  - Density: 5/km^{2} (13/sq mi)
- OS grid reference: SH 9149 3489
  - Cardiff: 99.9 mi (160.8 km)
  - London: 176.2 mi (283.6 km)
- Community: Llanycil
- Principal area: Gwynedd
- Country: Wales
- Sovereign state: United Kingdom
- Post town: Y Bala
- Police: North Wales
- Fire: North Wales
- Ambulance: Welsh
- List of places UK Wales Gwynedd 52.90°N 3.61°W Map of the community

Llanycil is a community in the county of Gwynedd, Wales, near Bala; it is 99.9 miles (160.7 km) from Cardiff and 176.2 miles (283.6 km) from London. In 2011 the population of Llanycil was 416, with 80.4% able to speak Welsh. The community includes the small settlements of Parc, Rhyd-uchaf and Llidiardau.

It is a very sparsely populated community covering about 83 square kilometres. The mountain Arenig Fawr is within the community.

The former church in the community was dedicated to Saint Beuno and now houses the Mary Jones World heritage centre. Thomas Charles (1755–1814) of Bala, the Calvinistic Methodist minister and founder of the British and Foreign Bible Society, is buried in the village churchyard. The hamlet of Parc is known for the branch of the Women's Institute which in 1967 broke away when the movement began to insist on the English language, and founded Merched y Wawr, which uses solely Welsh.

== Notable people ==
- Betsi Cadwaladr (1789–1860), a Welsh nurse who nursed in the Crimean War alongside Florence Nightingale.

== See also ==
- List of localities in Wales by population
