= Cywarch =

Area in Gwynedd, Wales

Coordinates: 52.7278°N 3.6773°W

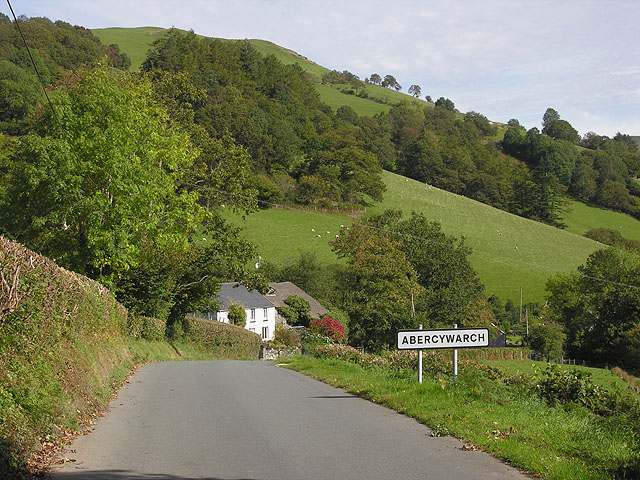

Cywarch (also known as Aber-Cywarch or Aber Cywarch) is a location at the head of Cwm Cywarch in the Snowdonia National Park, in Gwynedd, Wales. Several streams flow through the area, uniting to form Afon Cywarch, a tributary of the River Dyfi.

The area is entirely agricultural, based on sheep farming, with some tourism generated by scenery and hill-walking. Until the end of the 19th century there were lead workings that gave rise to a mining village and works. A mining company office remains, mining buildings have been incorporated into local farms and some earthworks remain, otherwise the buildings, including the village, have vanished. An explanatory sign has been sited at a new car park near the end of the public road.

Prior to mining, the area was isolated and during the 16th century it was home to a band of outlaws known as Cochion Cywarch (The Reds of Cywarch), said to be named for the colour of their leader's hair. The "Brigand’s Inn" in Mallwyd, is named after them.
