= Cefnddwysarn =

Coordinates: 52.934°N 3.540°W

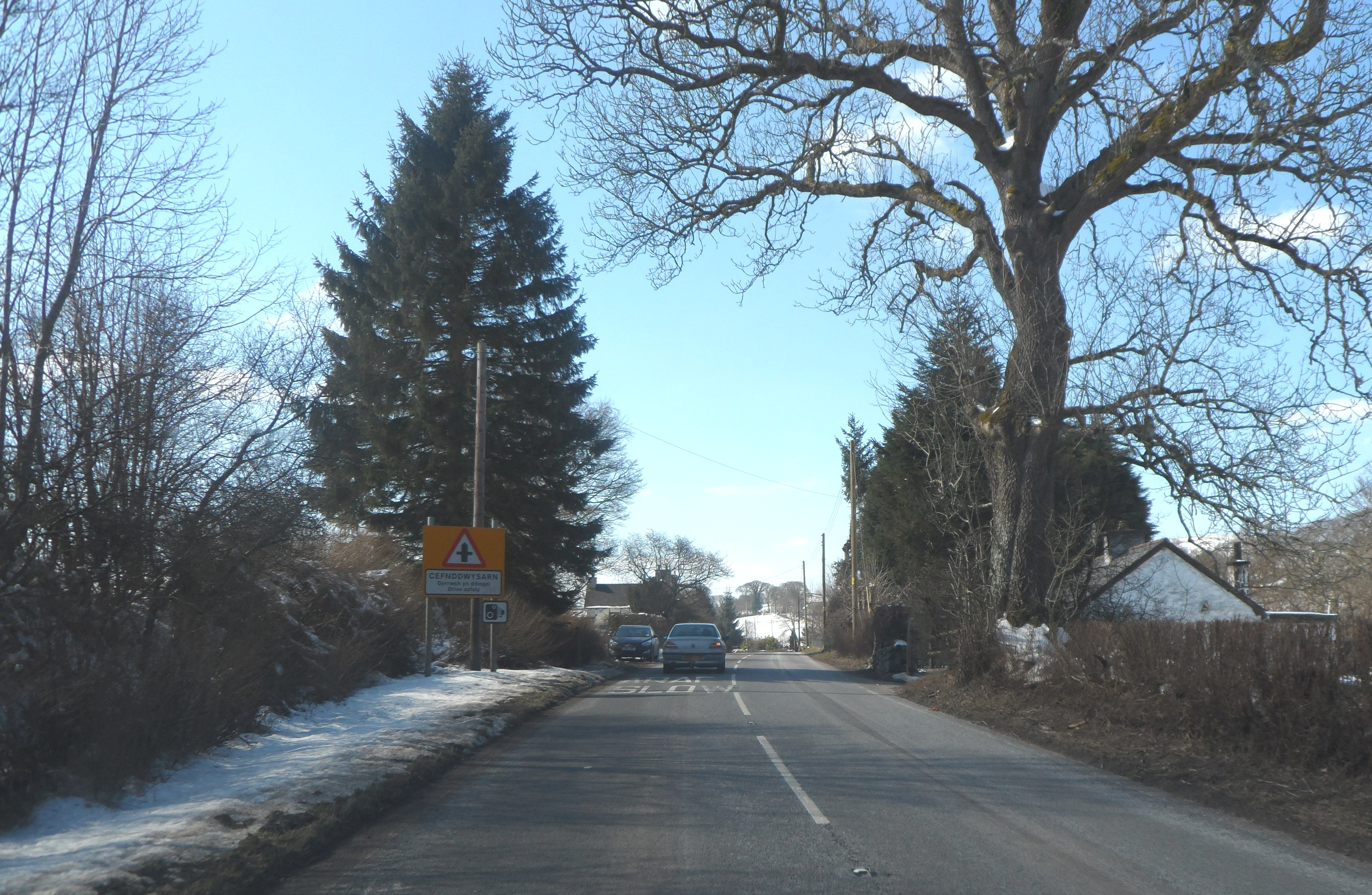
- Entering Cefnddwysarn

- Location within Gwynedd
- OS grid reference: SH965385
- Community: Llandderfel
- Principal area: Gwynedd
- Country: Wales
- Sovereign state: United Kingdom
- Post town: BALA
- Postcode district: LL23
- Dialling code: 01678
- Police: North Wales
- Fire: North Wales
- Ambulance: Welsh
- UK Parliament: Dwyfor Meirionnydd
- Senedd Cymru – Welsh Parliament: Dwyfor Meirionnydd

Cefnddwysarn (Welsh pronunciation) is a small village in Gwynedd, Wales.

It is located on the A494 road approximately 3 miles east of the town of Bala and 8 miles west of Corwen. The village is situated within the traditional county of Merionethshire, and the community of Llandderfel.
