= Bala, Gwynedd =

Town in Gwynedd, Wales

Y Bala
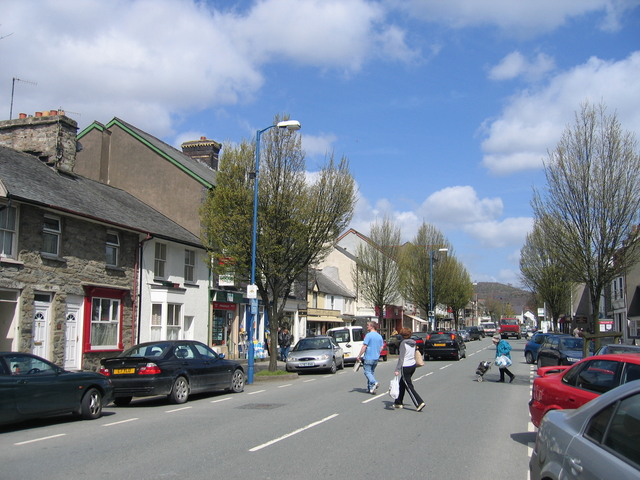
- Bala High Street

- Location within Gwynedd
- Population: 1,999 (2021)
- OS grid reference: SH925359
  - Cardiff: 142.3 miles
  - London: 207 miles
- Community: Bala
- Principal area: Gwynedd
- Preserved county: Gwynedd
- Country: Wales
- Sovereign state: United Kingdom
- Post town: BALA
- Postcode district: LL23
- Dialling code: 01678
- Police: North Wales
- Fire: North Wales
- Ambulance: Welsh
- UK Parliament: Dwyfor Meirionnydd
- Senedd Cymru – Welsh Parliament: Gwynedd Maldwyn
- Councillors: Dilwyn Morgan (Plaid Cymru)
- List of places UK Wales Gwynedd 52.911°N 3.596°W Map of the community

Bala (Welsh: Y Bala) is a town and community in Gwynedd, Wales. Formerly an urban district, Bala lies in the historic county of Merionethshire, at the north end of Llyn Tegid. According to the 2021 census, Bala had a population of 1,999 and 72.5 per cent of the population could speak Welsh.

== Toponym ==
The Welsh word "bala" refers to the outflow/efflux of a lake, specifically Llyn Tegid. In Welsh, it is preceded by the definite article y, as "Y Bala" (or "y Bala" in running text), and since at least 2018, is recommended by the Welsh Language Commissioner to be used in English too (unless part of a sentence).

== History ==
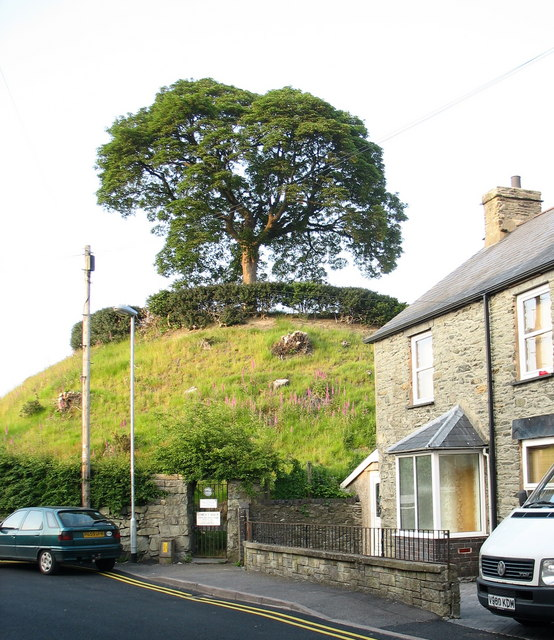
Tomen y Bala

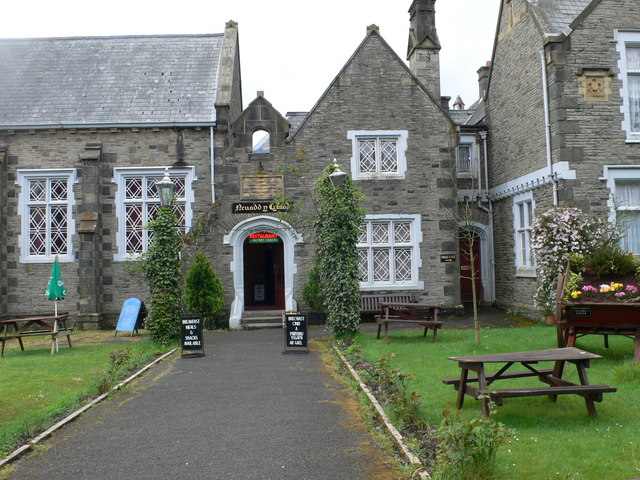
Neuadd y Cyfnod (English: Period Hall. Formerly the grammar school)

Tomen Y Bala (30 feet (9 m) high by 50 feet (15 m) diameter) is a tumulus or "moat-hill", formerly thought to mark the site of a Roman camp.

In the 18th century, the town was well known for the manufacture of flannel, stockings, gloves and hosiery.

The large stone-built theological college, Coleg y Bala, of the Calvinistic Methodists and the grammar school (now Ysgol y Berwyn), which was founded in 1712, are the chief features, together with the statue of the Rev. Thomas Charles (1755–1814), the theological writer, to whom was largely due the foundation of the British and Foreign Bible Society. In 1800 a 15-year-old girl, Mary Jones, walked the 25 miles (40 km) from her home village Llanfihangel-y-Pennant to purchase a Welsh Bible in Bala. The scarcity of the Bible, along with the determination of Mary to get one (she had saved for six years), was a major factor in the foundation of the British and Foreign Bible Society in 1804.

Betsi Cadwaladr, who worked with Florence Nightingale in the Crimea, and who gave her name to the Health Board, came from Bala. Other famous people from the Bala area include Michael D. Jones, Christopher Timothy, Owen Morgan Edwards, born in Llanuwchllyn, and T.E. Ellis, born in Cefnddwysarn.

Bala hosted the National Eisteddfod in 1967, 1997 and 2009. The 2009 Eisteddfod was notable because the chair was not awarded to any of the entrants as the standard was deemed to be too low. Bala hosted the Eisteddfod Genedlaethol yr Urdd Gobaith Cymru, National Eisteddfod for the Welsh League of Youth, in 2014. On 16 June 2016, Bala's name was changed to Bale temporarily in honour of Real Madrid forward Gareth Bale. This was only for the duration of UEFA Euro 2016.

In the 1910s, Bala and the nearby Arenig Fawr mountain became a focal point for a group of artists including Welsh painters James Dickson Innes and Augustus John, and Australian Derwent Lees. Inspired by the local landscape, they painted the mountain and surrounding scenery repeatedly. This period marked the emergence of the "Arenig School" of painting, which brought Post-Impressionist and Fauvist influences to Wales.

== Twinning ==
Bala, Ontario, Canada, was named after the town in 1868. They have become twin towns.

== Demographics ==
=== Languages ===
According to the 2021 United Kingdom census, 72.5 per cent of all usual residents aged 3+ in Bala can speak Welsh.

The 2011 census noted 78.5 per cent of all usual residents aged 3 years and older in the town could speak Welsh. The Welsh-language skills of Bala residents were as follows in 2011 and 2021:

Welsh language skill	Number and % of persons aged 3+ (2011)	Number and % of persons aged 3+ (2021)	Change (percentage points)
One or more Welsh language skills	1,607 (85.1%)	1,550 (79.6%)	-5.5
Can understand spoken Welsh	1,472 (77.9%)	1,424 (73.2%)	-4.7
Can speak, read or write Welsh	1,503 (79.6%)		
Can speak Welsh	1,482 (78.5%)	1,410 (72.5%)	-6.0
Can read Welsh	1,367 (72.4%)	1,294 (66.5%)	-5.9
Can write Welsh	1,287 (68.1%)	1,256 (64.6%)	-3.5
Can speak, read and write Welsh	1,271 (67.3%)	1,209 (62.1%)	-5.2
Total aged 3+	1,889	1,945	

=== Identity ===
According to the 2011 census, 70.5 per cent of the population noted that they had Welsh-only national identity, with 22.2 per cent noting that they had no Welsh national identity at all. According to the 2021 census, 64.8 per cent of the population noted that they had Welsh-only national identity.

== Geography ==
Set within the Bala Fault, Llyn Tegid (Bala Lake) is the largest natural lake in Wales at 3.7 miles (6.0 km) in length and 800 metres (870 yards) wide. At 35 metres (115 feet), its depths could hide the tower of St Giles Church in Wrexham and still have 1 metre (3.3 feet) of water above. The lake has occasionally been known to freeze over, most recently in the severe winters of 1947 and 1963. The rare Gwyniad fish—trapped in the lake at the end of the last ice age, some 10,000 years ago—is in danger because its natural home is increasingly unsuitable. A member of the whitefish family, it is found only in the lake.

Cwm Hirnant, a valley running south from Bala, gives its name to the Hirnantian Age in the Ordovician Period of geological time.

The closest major urban areas to Bala are Wrexham at 30 miles (48 km), Chester at 40 miles (64 km), and Liverpool, 52 miles (84 km) to the northeast. Nearby villages include Llanfor, Llandderfel, Llanycil, Llangower, Llanuwchllyn, Rhyd-uchaf and Rhos-y-gwaliau.

=== Climate ===
As with the rest of the UK, Bala benefits from a maritime climate, with limited seasonal temperature ranges, and generally moderate rainfall throughout the year.

Climate data for Bala (1991–2020 normals, extremes 1970-present)
Month	Jan	Feb	Mar	Apr	May	Jun	Jul	Aug	Sep	Oct	Nov	Dec	Year
Record high °C (°F)	16.4 (61.5)	20.0 (68.0)	21.1 (70.0)	25.2 (77.4)	30.8 (87.4)	32.1 (89.8)	34.9 (94.8)	32.2 (90.0)	28.7 (83.7)	26.3 (79.3)	19.1 (66.4)	16.5 (61.7)	34.9 (94.8)
Mean daily maximum °C (°F)	7.3 (45.1)	7.6 (45.7)	9.5 (49.1)	12.3 (54.1)	15.3 (59.5)	17.7 (63.9)	19.3 (66.7)	18.9 (66.0)	16.9 (62.4)	13.4 (56.1)	10.0 (50.0)	7.6 (45.7)	13.0 (55.4)
Daily mean °C (°F)	4.3 (39.7)	4.4 (39.9)	5.7 (42.3)	7.8 (46.0)	10.5 (50.9)	13.1 (55.6)	15.0 (59.0)	14.7 (58.5)	12.7 (54.9)	9.7 (49.5)	6.8 (44.2)	4.6 (40.3)	9.1 (48.4)
Mean daily minimum °C (°F)	1.4 (34.5)	1.2 (34.2)	2.0 (35.6)	3.3 (37.9)	5.8 (42.4)	8.6 (47.5)	10.7 (51.3)	10.5 (50.9)	8.4 (47.1)	6.0 (42.8)	3.5 (38.3)	1.6 (34.9)	5.3 (41.5)
Record low °C (°F)	−16.5 (2.3)	−5.6 (21.9)	−10.5 (13.1)	−8.0 (17.6)	−4.5 (23.9)	−3.2 (26.2)	0.1 (32.2)	0.7 (33.3)	−1.8 (28.8)	−5.7 (21.7)	−12.4 (9.7)	−16.0 (3.2)	−16.5 (2.3)
Average precipitation mm (inches)	153.6 (6.05)	130.1 (5.12)	100.9 (3.97)	77.4 (3.05)	77.4 (3.05)	75.8 (2.98)	75.4 (2.97)	87.5 (3.44)	96.8 (3.81)	139.4 (5.49)	144.6 (5.69)	176.6 (6.95)	1,335.5 (52.58)
Average precipitation days (≥ 1.0 mm)	16.9	13.8	14.0	12.1	12.2	11.5	12.2	13.3	12.8	15.6	17.7	18.3	170.3
Mean monthly sunshine hours	31.0	53.5	94.8	142.0	168.6	157.2	152.5	135.8	109.3	76.2	41.0	23.6	1,185.5
Source 1: Met Office
Source 2: Starlings Roost Weather

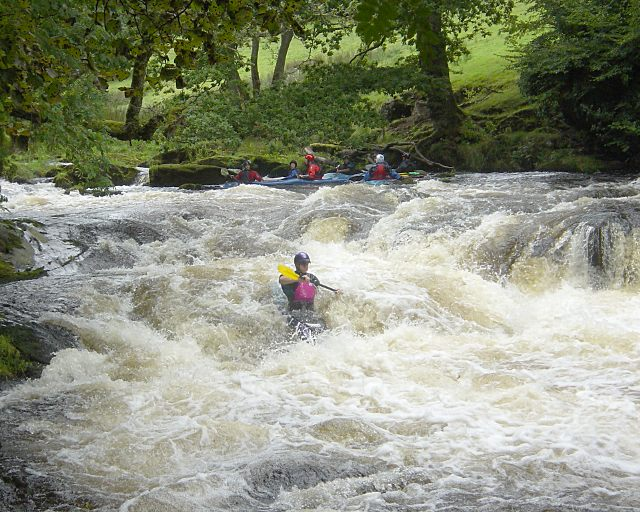
Bala Mill Falls (lower Tryweryn)

== Attractions ==
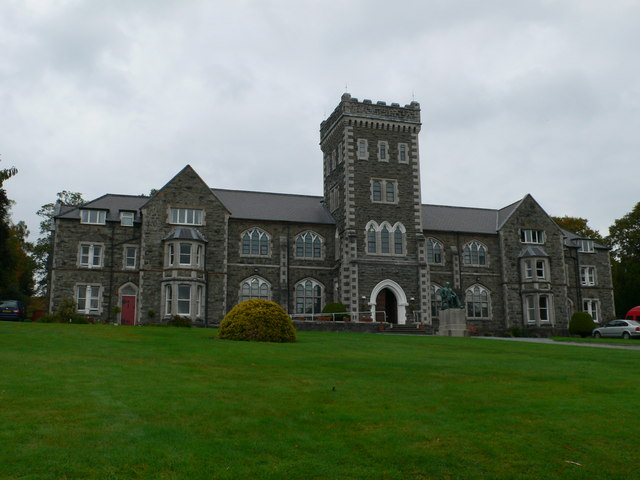
Coleg y Bala

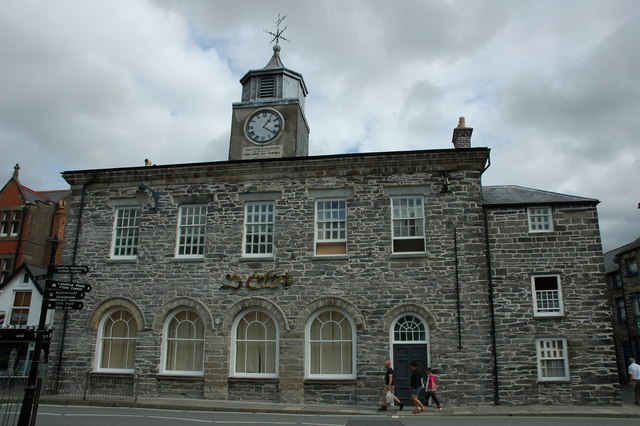
Bala Town Hall

Afon Tryweryn, a river fed from Llyn Celyn which runs through Bala, is world-famous for its white water kayaking. International governing bodies, the International Canoe Federation, the European Canoe Union and the British Canoe Union all hold national and international events there. The Canolfan Tryweryn National Whitewater Centre has its home in Bala. There are at least three local campsites that cater for the influx of canoeists from many parts of the world.

An annual music festival known as 'Wa Bala' is also held in the town. The venue hosts local Welsh bands and is similar in format to Dolgellau's Sesiwn Fawr.

Nearby are the mountains Aran Fawddwy and Arenig Fawr.

Coleg y Bala is at the top of the hill on the road towards Llyn Celyn. The Victoria Hall is a small old cinema, that had been a community hall. There are several chapels, notably Capel Mawr and Capel Bach. The livestock market on Arenig Street is still going strong. Bro Eryl estate was built just after World War II. Mary Jones World, a heritage centre about Mary Jones and her Bible is located just outside the town in nearby Llanycil. Caerau Gardens, near Bala, ranks as "the highest garden open to the public in North Wales".

Bala Town Hall, which now operates as a restaurant, dates back to circa 1800.

== Transport ==
Bala has been served by various railway stations on the Great Western Railway:

- Bala Lake Halt railway station was Bala's first station, on the Bala and Dolgelly Railway (open 1868 to 1882; 1934 to 1939)
  - Bala (Penybont) railway station is the name of the Bala Lake heritage railway's station on the site of the Bala Lake Halt
- Bala (New) railway station - Bala's second station, on the Festiniog and Blaenau Railway (open 1882 to 1965)
- Bala Junction railway station - The meeting point of the Bala and Dolgellau Railway, Corwen and Bala Railway and the Bala and Festiniog Railway (open 1882 to 1965)

The Bala Lake Railway (Welsh: Rheilffordd Llyn Tegid) runs for 4.5 miles (7.2 km) from Llanuwchllyn to the edge of the town, along a section of the former trackbed of the Great Western Railway's line between Ruabon and Barmouth. It terminates at Bala (Penybont) railway station, which opened in 1976 on the site of the former Lake Halt station. As of 2020, work is being undertaken to extend the line along the lake foreshore to a new station in the town centre.

Bus services are provided by Lloyds Coaches, as part of the Welsh Government funded TrawsCymru network. Services operate westbound to Barmouth via Dolgellau, and eastbound to Wrexham via Corwen and Llangollen. Through ticketing is available for onward connections at Dolgellau, to Bangor, Machynlleth and Aberystwyth.

The town lies on the A494, a major trunk road that leads to Dolgellau, 18 miles to the southwest, and to Ruthin, Mold and Queensferry to the northwest. The A4212 starts in the town, and crosses the Migneint to Trawsfynydd. Heading southeast, the B4391 crosses the Berwyn range to the English border and the town of Oswestry.

== Sport ==
Bala is home to Cymru Premier football club Bala Town F.C. who play at Maes Tegid. Bala's local rugby club is Bala RFC.

With Pontypridd, Pontefract and Pontypool, Pont y Bala forms a group of parkruns known as “The Full Ponty”, a pun on The Full Monty.

== Notable people ==
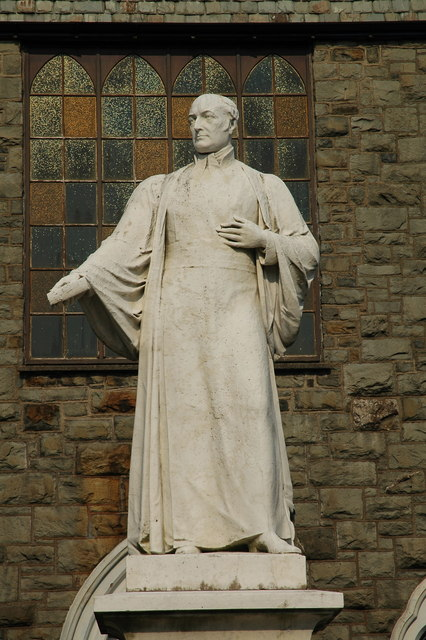
Rev. Thomas Charles

- Thomas Charles (1755 – 1814 in Bala), a Welsh Calvinistic Methodist clergyman.
- Betsi Cadwaladr (1789–1860), nurse, eponym for Betsi Cadwaladr University Health Board
- Michael D. Jones (1822 in Llanuwchlyn – 1898), a Welsh Congregationalist minister, principal of Bala theological college, a founder of the Welsh settlement in Patagonia and one of the fathers of modern Welsh nationalism
- John Hugh Jones (1843–1910) a Welsh Roman Catholic priest, translator and tutor.
- Richard John Lloyd Price (1843–1923), squire, journalist, author and judge at field trials
- T. E. Ellis (1859–1899), politician and leader of Cymru Fydd
- Robert Thomas Jenkins (1881–1969), historian and academic, brought up in Bala.
- Jack Evans (1889–1971), footballer, played 354 games for Cardiff City F.C.
- Christopher Timothy (born 1940), actor
- Actavia (born 2002), drag queen who appeared as a contestant on the sixth series of RuPaul's Drag Race UK

== Gallery ==
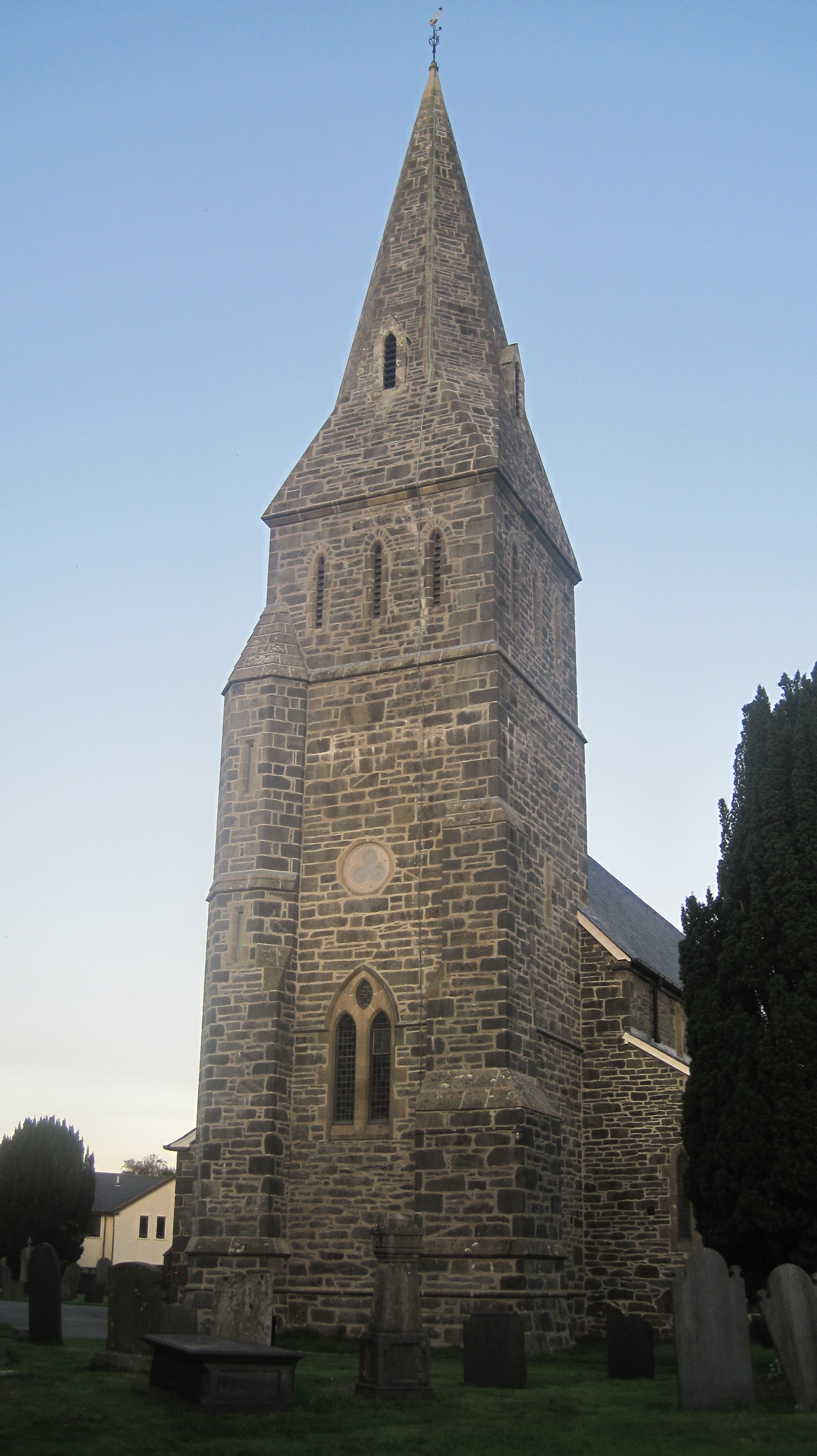
Christ Church

== See also ==
- Bala Series of geologic beds in Bala
- Bala Cynwyd, Pennsylvania
- Bala Town F.C., local football team.
- Bala RFC, local rugby union club.
