= Drumlemble =

Coordinates: 55°24′49″N 5°41′22″W

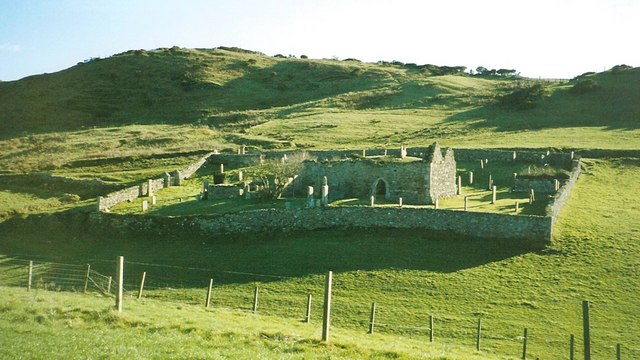
Kilkivan Cemetery and Chapel, by Wester Drumlemble

Drumlemble (Scottish Gaelic: Druim Leamhan, pronounced [t̪ɾumˈlãũ.an]) is a small village on the Kintyre peninsula in Argyll and Bute, Scotland.

The village of Drumlemble is approximately 4 miles to the west of the nearest town, Campbeltown, on the B843.

Drumlemble Halt was a small station on the Campbeltown and Machrihanish Light Railway, opening in 1906 and closing in 1932.

The village consists of the main settlement of Drumlemble and the two outlying settlements of Easter and Wester Drumlemble. The local school, Drumlemble Primary School, caters for the people of Drumlemble, Machrihanish and other settlements in the southern part of the Laggan plain.

The historic Tirfergus House was located one mile south of Drumlemble.
