= Campbeltown railway station =

Disused railway station in Scotland

Campbeltown Railway Station
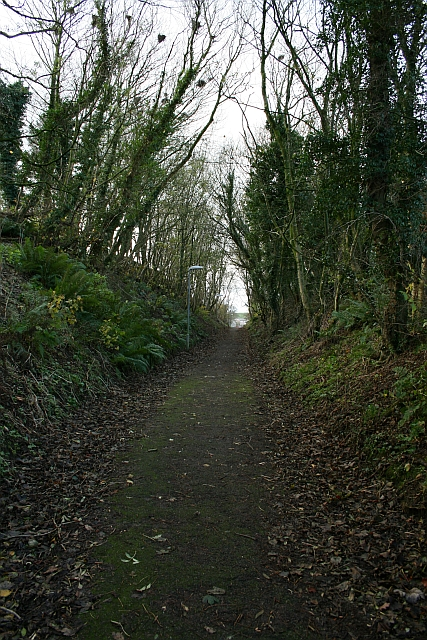
- A railway cutting in Campbeltown near the old station

General information
- Location: Campbeltown, Argyll and Bute; Scotland
- Coordinates: 55.4243°N 5.6031°W
- Grid reference: NR7209320402
- Platforms: None

Other information
- Status: Disused

History
- Original company: Campbeltown and Machrihanish Light Railway

Key dates
- 16 August 1906: Station opened
- November 1931: Station closed
- January 1932: Station re-opened
- May 1932: Station closed to passengers
- 1934: Track lifted
Location

Campbeltown was a railway station in the town of Campbeltown, Argyll and Bute, serving the town and ferry terminal. The Campbeltown and Machrihanish Light Railway was a 2 ft 3 in (686 mm) narrow gauge railway in Kintyre, Scotland, between the towns of Campbeltown and Machrihanish. Plantation Halt was the next stop on the line.

== History ==
The station on Hall Street had no platforms and only a run round loop for the locomotive between the Old and New Quays. Upgraded from a coal carrying mineral line and opened for passenger traffic in 1906, the railway did not have stations as such, just places where the train halted to pick up passengers. Many of the passengers were day trippers from Glasgow as a turbine steamer would bring passengers to Campbeltown early enough to catch a train to Machrihanish and allow a return journey all in one day.

Only three other passenger-carrying lines in the UK operated on the same gauge, all of them in Wales - the Corris Railway, the short-lived Plynlimon and Hafan Tramway and the Talyllyn Railway.

Preceding station	Disused railways	Following station
Plantation	Campbeltown to Machrihanish; Campbeltown and Machrihanish Light Railway	Terminus
