= Talybont =

Talybont (otherwise Tal-y-bont) may refer to:

== Places in Wales ==
- Tal-y-bont, Ceredigion
- Tal-y-bont, Conwy
- Talybont, Bangor
- Tal-y-bont, Dyffryn Ardudwy
- Talybont-on-Usk, Powys
- Talybont Reservoir, Brecon Beacons
- Llys Talybont Halls of Residence, Cardiff University

== Other uses ==
- "Talybont", a song on the 1975 Free Hand album by Gentle Giant
- Talybont, a former name of Rheidol (locomotive)
