= Moss Road Halt railway station =

Former railway station in Scotland

Moss Road Halt

General information
- Location: Campbeltown, Argyll and Bute; Scotland
- Coordinates: 55.4243°N 5.6535°W
- Grid reference: NR 68906 20570
- Platforms: None

Other information
- Status: Disused

History
- Original company: Campbeltown and Machrihanish Light Railway

Key dates
- 16 August 1906: Station opened
- November 1931: Station closed
- January 1932: Station re-opened
- May 1932: Station closed to passengers
- 1934: Track lifted
Location

Moss Road Halt was a railway station situated at the road crossing on the road that runs across Aros Moss. Argyll and Bute.

The Campbeltown and Machrihanish Light Railway was a 2 ft 3 in (686 mm) narrow gauge railway in Kintyre, Scotland, between the towns of Campbeltown and Machrihanish.

== History ==
The station had no platforms and was located at a site where the train had to slow before crossing the lane.

Upgraded from a coal carrying mineral lined and opened for passenger traffic in 1906, the railway did not have stations as such, just places where the train halted to pick up passengers. Many of the passengers were day trippers from Glasgow as a turbine steamer would bring passengers to Campbeltown early enough to catch a train to Machrihanish and allow a return journey all in one day.

Only three other passenger-carrying lines in the UK operated on the same gauge, all of them in Wales - the Corris Railway, the short-lived Plynlimon and Hafan Tramway and the Talyllyn Railway.

Preceding station	Disused railways	Following station
Plantation Halt	Campbeltown to Machrihanish; Campbeltown and Machrihanish Light Railway	Lintmill Halt
