= Lintmill Halt railway station =

Former railway station in Scotland

Lintmill Halt railway Station

General information
- Location: Machrihanish, Argyll and Bute; Scotland
- Coordinates: 55.4235°N 5.6601°W
- Grid reference: NR6848320499
- Platforms: None

Other information
- Status: Disused

History
- Original company: Campbeltown and Machrihanish Light Railway

Key dates
- 16 August 1906: Station opened
- November 1931: Station closed
- January 1932: Station re-opened
- May 1932: Station closed to passengers
- 1934: Track lifted
Location

Lintmill Halt was a railway station about two miles (3 km) from Campbeltown, Argyll and Bute, serving the rural locale and the nearby lint mill. The Campbeltown and Machrihanish Light Railway was a 2 ft 3 in (686 mm) narrow gauge railway in Kintyre, Scotland, between the towns of Campbeltown and Machrihanish.

== History ==
The station had no platforms, but a passing loop was present with signals and a small signal box structure.

Upgraded from a coal carrying mineral lined and opened for passenger traffic in 1906, the railway did not have stations as such, just places where the train halted to pick up passengers. Many of the passengers were day trippers from Glasgow as a turbine steamer would bring passengers to Campbeltown early enough to catch a train to Machrihanish and allow a return journey all in one day. The next stop on the railway was Drumlemble Halt. Edmonson style tickets were issued for journeys to and from this halt.

Only three other passenger-carrying lines in the UK operated on the same gauge, all of them in Wales - the Corris Railway, the short-lived Plynlimon and Hafan Tramway and the Talyllyn Railway.

Preceding station	Disused railways	Following station
Moss Road Halt	Campbeltown to Machrihanish; Campbeltown and Machrihanish Light Railway	Drumlemble Halt
