= Ruth Jên =

Welsh artist

Ruth Jên (born 1964) is a Welsh artist, working in the old shoe shop in the village of Tal-y-bont, Ceredigion.

== Biography ==
Born Ruth Jên Evans at Cefn Llwyd, she studied on an Art Foundation Course at Carmarthen before completing a degree in fine art in Cardiff (1983–1987), specialising in printmaking. She returned to Aberystwyth having completed her studies, and worked for Yr Academi Gymreig, and doing book cover illustration work on a freelance basis for the local publishers, Y Lolfa.Wales She painted the first mural in Tal-y-bont in 1991.

Evans' illustration work is often in mixed media, combining painting, collage and printmaking techniques.

At the 2023 National Eisteddfod she won the People's Choice Award at Y Lle Celf, for an exhibit of 600 ceramic creatures.

== Awards and honours ==
- Bilingual Design Awards, Welsh Language Board 2002
- People's Choice Award, Y Lle Celf, National Eisteddfod 2023
