= List of shipwrecks in June 1858 =

The list of shipwrecks in June 1858 includes ships sunk, foundered, wrecked, grounded, or otherwise lost during June 1858.

== 1 June ==
List of shipwrecks: 1 June 1858
Ship	State	Description
Alma	United Kingdom	The schooner ran aground on Harry's Furlong, in Liverpool Bay.
Caroline	Norway	The brig ran aground on the Goodwin Sands, Kent, United Kingdom. She was on a voyage from Trondheim to Caen, Calvados, France. She was refloated.
Minerva	United Kingdom	The ship departed from Malta for a British port. No further trace, presumed foundered with the loss of all hands.
Temperance	United Kingdom	The ship was wrecked 9 nautical miles (17 km) north east of Bude, Cornwall with the loss of all hands.

== 2 June ==
List of shipwrecks: 2 June 1858
Ship	State	Description
HMS Haughty	Royal Navy	Second Opium War: The Albacore-class gunboat ran aground in the Yangtze.
Jenny Lind	(United Kingdom of Great Britain and Ireland) British North America	The steamship ran aground on the Long Sault, in the Saint Lawrence River, and sank.

== 3 June ==
List of shipwrecks: 3 June 1858
Ship	State	Description
Alma	United States	The brig was wrecked on Mayaguana, Bahamas. She was on a voyage from Gonaïves, Haiti to New York.

== 4 June ==
List of shipwrecks: 4 June 1858
Ship	State	Description
Royal Sovereign	United Kingdom	The barque was wrecked in St. George's Bay. She was on a voyage from Miramichi, New Brunswick, British North America to Belfast, County Antrim.

== 6 June ==
List of shipwrecks: 6 June 1858
Ship	State	Description
Indiana	United States	The steamship was wrecked at the Crisp Point Lighthouse, Michigan.
Peri	(United Kingdom of Great Britain and Ireland) British North America	The ship was driven ashore on Big Tusket Island, Nova Scotia. She was on a voyage from Sydney, Nova Scotia to Saint John, New Brunswick. She was consequently condemned.

== 7 June ==
List of shipwrecks: 7 June 1858
Ship	State	Description
Oliver Van Noord	Netherlands	The barque was wrecked on Keen's Reef, in the Torres Strait. Her crew were rescued by Sea Park (United Kingdom). She was on a voyage from Melbourne, Victoria to a port in India.
Rodney	United Kingdom	The ship ran aground on Keen's Reef, in the Torres Straits and capsized. She was on a voyage from Melbourne to Bombay, India.

== 8 June ==
List of shipwrecks: 8 June 1858
Ship	State	Description
Darmstadter	Flag unknown	The ship was lost in the Thanlwin. She was on a voyage from Moulmein, Burma to Falmouth, Cornwall, United Kingdom.
Raphael	France	The ship ran aground and capsized at South Shields, County Durham, United Kingdom. She was on a voyage from Dunkirk, Nord to South Shields. She was righted.

== 9 June ==
List of shipwrecks: 9 June 1858
Ship	State	Description
Medallion	United Kingdom	The ship capsized at South Shields, County Durham, United Kingdom.
Richard Brown	United Kingdom	The ship was driven ashore at Demerara, British Guiana.

== 10 June ==
List of shipwrecks: 10 June 1858
Ship	State	Description
Antonio	Spain	The schooner ran aground on the Goodwin Sands, Kent, United Kingdom. She was on a voyage from a Norwegian port to Torrevecchia Teatina, Papal States.
Arabia	United Kingdom	The ship was wrecked in Table Bay. All on board were rescued.
Bonne Mathilde	France	The schooner was run into by an American barque and foundered in the Mediterranean Sea 30 nautical miles (56 km) west of Casablanca, Morocco. Her crew survived. She was on a voyage from Gibraltar to a Moroccan port.
Cahuzac	United States	The schooner was driven ashore in Machrihanish Bay. She was on a voyage from New York to Glasgow, Renfrewshire, United Kingdom.
Princess Royal	United Kingdom	The ship ran aground at the mouth of the Mississippi River. She was refloated on 25 June and resumed her voyage.

== 11 June ==
List of shipwrecks: 11 June 1858
Ship	State	Description
Busy	United Kingdom	The ship struck the Mixon Sand in the Bristol Channel and foundered. She was on a voyage from Beaumaris, Anglesey to Neath, Glamorgan.
Hannibal	Denmark	The ship was in collision with the schooner Leontine (Sweden) and sank in the North Sea. Her crew were rescued. She was on a voyage from London, United Kingdom to Königsberg, Prussia.

== 12 June ==
List of shipwrecks: 12 June 1858
Ship	State	Description
Blorenge	United Kingdom	The barque ran aground and sank at Mazatlan, Cuba. Her crew were rescued.
Eliza	France	The ship foundered at sea. Six crew were rescued.
New York	United States	The steamship ran ashore on the Mull of Kintyre, Argyllshire. All on board were rescued. She was on a voyage from Greenock, Renfrewshire to New York, United States. New York floated off on 15 July and sank.
Zebron	(United Kingdom of Great Britain and Ireland) British North America	The brig was wrecked on Hawe's Shoal. Her crew were rescued.

== 13 June ==
List of shipwrecks: 13 June 1858
Ship	State	Description
Pennsylvania	United States	The steamboat suffered a boiler explosion and sank in the Mississippi River near Memphis, Tennessee with the loss of about 450 lives.

== 14 June ==
List of shipwrecks: 14 June 1858
Ship	State	Description
Sparkling Wave	United Kingdom	The ship was driven ashore at Punta de Maya, Cuba. She was on a voyage from Matanzas to Havana. She was refloated the next day and resumed her voyage.

== 15 June ==
List of shipwrecks: 15 June 1858
Ship	State	Description
Matilda	United Kingdom	The ship struck a sunken rock in Algoa Bay. She was on a voyage from Cape Town, Cape Colony to London. She was consequently condemned.

== 16 June ==
List of shipwrecks: 16 June 1858
Ship	State	Description
Indian Empire	United Kingdom	The paddle steamer ran aground on St. Margaret's Rocks, off the coast of County Galway. She was on a voyage from Southampton, Hampshire to Galway.
Sea Witch	United Kingdom	The ship was wrecked on Île Plate, Mauritius. She was on a voyage from Bombay, India to London.
St. Louis	France	The steamship was destroyed by fire at Singapore, Straits Settlements. She was on a voyage from Calcutta, India to Hong Kong.

== 17 June ==
List of shipwrecks: 17 June 1858
Ship	State	Description
Isabel Beurmann	United States	The brig was in collision with the whaler Spartan (United States and was abandoned in the Atlantic Ocean. All on board were rescued by Spartan. Isabel Beurmann was on a voyage from New York to Port-au-Prince, Haiti. She was discovered on 19 June by the brig Caroline (United States, which put three crew on board. She was taken in to New York.
Joseph and Hannah	United States	The barque was wrecked on Bimini, Bahamas. She was on a voyage from Newport, Rhode Island to Havana, Cuba.

== 18 June ==
List of shipwrecks: 18 June 1858
Ship	State	Description
Avon	United Kingdom	The ship was driven ashore at Harbour Grace, Newfoundland, British North America. She was on a voyage from Liverpool, Lancashire to Harbour Grace. She was refloated.

== 19 June ==
List of shipwrecks: 19 June 1858
Ship	State	Description
Southampton	United Kingdom	The ship ran aground on Neckman's Ground, in the Baltic Sea. She was on a voyage from Newcastle upon Tyne, Northumberland to Kronstadt, Russia. She was later refloated and taken in to Kronstadt, arriving on 24 June.

== 20 June ==
List of shipwrecks: 20 June 1858
Ship	State	Description
Elizabeth Sarah	United Kingdom	The ship foundered. Her crew were rescued. She was on a voyage from Newcastle upon Tyne, Northumberland to Quebec City, Province of Canada, British North America.

== 21 June ==
List of shipwrecks: 21 June 1858
Ship	State	Description
Australia	United Kingdom	The ship caught fire at Milford Haven, Pembrokeshire. She was scuttled on 25 June.
Caroline	United Kingdom	The ship ran aground on the Cork Bank, in the Irish Sea off County Cork. She was refloated and put back to Queenstown, County Cork.
Edinburgh	United Kingdom	The steamship ran aground at Reval, Russia.
Good Intent	United Kingdom	The ship ran aground in the Somme. She was on a voyage from South Shields, County Durham to Abbeville, Somme. She was refloated.

== 22 June ==
List of shipwrecks: 22 June 1858
Ship	State	Description
Cambronne	France	The barque was driven ashore east of Tangiers, Morocco. Her crew survived.
Caroline	United Kingdom	The ship ran aground on the Camden Bank, in the Irish Sea off the County Cork.

== 24 June ==
List of shipwrecks: 24 June 1858
Ship	State	Description
Albatros	France	The brig was wrecked on the Longsand, in the North Sea off the coast of Essex, United Kingdom. Her crew were rescued. She was on a voyage from Newcastle upon Tyne, Northumberland, United Kingdom to Nantes, Loire-Inférieure.
Ateos	France	The ship was wrecked on the Kentish Knock.
Julia	Norway	The ship was driven ashore at Stavanger. She was on a voyage from Stavanger to Newcastle upon Tyne.

== 25 June ==
List of shipwrecks: 25 June 1858
Ship	State	Description
Honorine	France	The lugger ran aground on the Longsand, in the North Sea off the coast of Essex, United Kingdom. She was on a voyage from Sunderland, County Durham, United Kingdom to Nantes, Loire-Inférieure. She was refloated the next day and taken in to Calais in a leaky condition.
Oscar	Norway	The ship was driven ashore in Åland, Grand Duchy of Finland. She was refloated the next day and towed in to Stockholm, Sweden in a waterlogged condition.
Themis	(United Kingdom of Great Britain and Ireland) British North America	The ship was abandoned 28 nautical miles (52 km) south east of Egg Harbour, New Jersey, United States. She was on a voyage from Havana, Cuba to Falmouth, Cornwall.

== 26 June ==
List of shipwrecks: 26 June 1858
Ship	State	Description
Cairnsmore	United Kingdom	The ship struck a rock between The Saddles and Raffles Island (30°42′10″N 122°34′40″E). She broke in two and sank. Her crew were rescued. Cairnsmore was on a voyage from Hong Kong to Shanghai, China.
Escape	France	The ship ran aground on the Bowmeal Rocks. She was on a voyage from Nantes, Loire-Inférieure to Belfast, County Antrim, United Kingdom. She was later refloated and taken in to Belfast, arriving on 29 June.
Leda	Kingdom of Hanover	The barque was wrecked on Boronga Island. Her crew were rescued. She was on a voyage from Akyab, British Burma to Singapore, Straits Settlements.
Louise	Denmark	The ship foundered in the North Sea. Her crew were rescued by Johanna and Heinrich ( Stettin). Louise was on a voyage from Newcastle upon Tyne, Northumberland, United Kingdom to Copenhagen.
Lustre, and Ocean	United Kingdom	The brigs became jammed together at the entrance to the East India Docks, London and were both wrecked. The collier Lustre was on a voyage from South Shields, County Durham to London. Ocean was on a voyage from London to Swansea, Glamorgan.
Two Friends	United Kingdom	The ship ran aground at Bideford, Devon.

== 27 June ==
List of shipwrecks: 27 June 1858
Ship	State	Description
Nancy Dawson	United Kingdom	The schooner ran aground at Lowestoft, Suffolk. She was refloated.
Rœlfina Gerardina	Netherlands	The schooner foundered in the Atlantic Ocean 220 nautical miles (410 km) south west of Lisbon, Portugal (41°08′N 14°12′W). Her six crew were rescued by Utopia (United Kingdom). Rœlfina Gerardina was on a voyage from St. Ubes, Portugal to Hellevoetsluis, Zeeland.

== 28 June ==
List of shipwrecks: 28 June 1858
Ship	State	Description
Her Majesty	United Kingdom	The steamship ran aground off Seaview, Isle of Wight. Her passengers were taken off. She was on an excursion from Ryde to Alum Bay and return. Her Majesty was refloated.
Vanguard	United Kingdom	The paddle tug collided with Ross D. Mangles and sank in the River Thames opposite Denton Windmill, Gravesend, Kent.

== 29 June ==
List of shipwrecks: 29 June 1858
Ship	State	Description
Annie	United Kingdom	The barque was driven ashore and wrecked at North Head, New South Wales. Her crew were rescued. She was on a voyage from Sydney, New South Wales to Point de Galle, Ceylon.
Harriet	United Kingdom	The steamship ran aground at the mouth of the Swine. She was on a voyage from Middlesbrough, Yorkshire to Stettin.
Silence	United Kingdom	The schooner ran aground on the Newcombe Sand, in the North Sea off the coast of Suffolk. She was refloated with assistance from the schooner Great Britain (United Kingdom) and resumed her voyage.

== 30 June ==
List of shipwrecks: 30 June 1858
Ship	State	Description
Florenge	Spain	The ship was wrecked at Mazatlan, Cuba.
Manuela	Spain	The ship ran aground in Queendale Bay. She was on a voyage from Bilbao to the Shetland Islands, United Kingdom.

== Unknown date ==
List of shipwrecks: Unknown date in June 1858
Ship	State	Description
Arkansas	United States	The 107-foot (33 m), 240.43-gross register ton two-masted schooner was wrecked without loss of life on the coat of Wisconsin while attempting to enter the harbor at Kenosha. Her cargo of lumber was salvaged.
Amazon	United Kingdom	The ship was wrecked at Arklow, County Wicklow before 11 June.
Auguste	Norway	The brig ran aground in the English Channel before 9 June. She was refloated and completed her voyage to Nieuwpoort, West Flanders, Belgium.
Bombay	United Kingdom	The ship was wrecked off Nassau, Bahamas. She was on a voyage from the Canary Islands to Matanzas, Cuba.
Clara	France	The ship foundered in the Atlantic Ocean. Her crew were rescued. She was on a voyage from Troon, Ayrshire, United Kingdom to Málaga, Spauin.
Elizabeth	United Kingdom	The ship was holed by her anchor and sank in the Restronguet Creek, Cornwall.
Fortuna	Netherlands	The ship was driven ashore and wrecked on the Maaasdroogte. Her crew survived. She was on a voyage from Brielle, South Holland to Newcastle upon Tyne, Northumberland, United Kingdom.
Julie	France	The ship was wrecked on the "Isle of Serpents", in the Danube before 20 June. Her crew were rescued by Averne (French Navy).
L'Oeuil d'Agde	France	The ship ran aground in the Danube 30 nautical miles (56 km) from Sulina, Ottoman Empire before 20 June. She was refloated with the assistance of Averne (French Navy).
Magee	Imperial Brazilian Navy	The steamship foundered off the mouth of the River Plate with the loss of about 400 lives.
Mary Pretty	United Kingdom	The schooner was wrecked off the mouth of the Courantyne River before 9 June with the loss of five lives.
Penny Coed	United Kingdom	The barque foundered off the mouth of the River Plate. Her crew were rescued by the barque Peruvian (United Kingdom).
Pierre	United Kingdom	The ship ran aground, capsized and sank at Sulina before 20 June. She was refloated a day later with the assistance of Averne (French Navy).
Port Royal	(United Kingdom of Great Britain and Ireland) British North America	The ship was wrecked at Tangier, Morocco. Her crew were rescued. She was on a voyage from "Annapolis" to Sydney, Nova Scotia.
Sarah	United Kingdom	The barque ran aground on the Longsand, in the North Sea off the coast of Essex. She was refloated with assistance from Alfred, Emma Jane, John and William and Marco Polo (all United Kingdom).
Sarah	United Kingdom	The ship ran aground on the Arklow Bank, in the Irish Sea off the coast of County Wicklow. She was on a voyage from Liverpool, Lancashire to Beypore, India. She was refloated and put back to Liverpool, where she arrived on 15 June.
Sultan	United Kingdom	The barque was wrecked in the Red Sea. Her crew were rescued. She was on a voyage from Aden to Suez, Egypt.
Tenasserim	(United Kingdom of Great Britain and Ireland) Straits Settlements	The ship foundered in the Indian Ocean with the loss of all hands. She was on a voyage from Singapore to Calcutta, India.
