= Tirfergus House =

Coordinates: 55.404°N 5.690°W

- Scottish Gaelic: Tir Fearghais; English: Fergus' land
- south of Drumlemble, Kintyre, Scotland

Tirfergus House was a mansion house south of Drumlemble, Kintyre, Argyll and Bute, Scotland. The house has been demolished. Blockwork incorporated into a farm outhouse has a commemorative panel bearing the date 1677.

It was owned by the MacNeal family of Lossit House.
