= Stewarton, Argyll =

Coordinates: 55°24′54″N 5°38′32″W

Stewarton: Scottish Gaelic: Baile nan Stiùbhartach
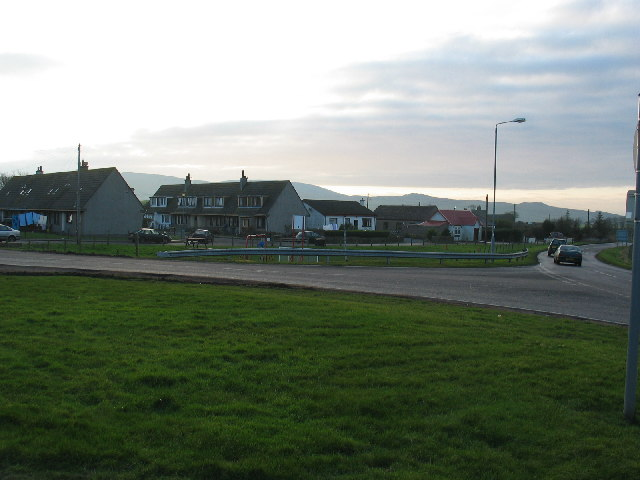
- Stewarton

- Location within Argyll and Bute
- OS grid reference: NR696198
- Council area: Argyll and Bute
- Lieutenancy area: Argyll and Bute
- Country: Scotland
- Sovereign state: United Kingdom
- Post town: CAMPBELTOWN
- Postcode district: PA28
- Police: Scotland
- Fire: Scottish
- Ambulance: Scottish
- UK Parliament: Argyll, Bute and South Lochaber
- Scottish Parliament: Argyll and Bute

Stewarton (Scottish Gaelic: Baile nan Stiùbhartach, pronounced [ˈpalə nəɲ ˈʃtʲuː.ərˠʃt̪əx]) is a hamlet on the junction of the B842 and B843 roads, in Kintyre, Argyll and Bute, Scotland, located around 1.5 miles (2.4 km) west of Campbeltown.

Plantation Halt was a nearby station on the Campbeltown and Machrihanish Light Railway that opened in 1906 and closed in 1932.
