= Machrihanish railway station =

Former railway station in Scotland

Coordinates: 55.4225°N 5.7332°W

Machrihanish railway Station

General information
- Location: Machrihanish, Argyll and Bute; Scotland
- Grid reference: NR 6505 2078

Other information
- Status: Disused

History
- Original company: Campbeltown and Machrihanish Light Railway

Key dates
- 16 August 1906: Station opened
- November 1931: Station closed
- January 1932: Station re-opened
- May 1932: Station closed to passengers
- 1934: Track lifted
Location

Machrihanish was a railway station in the village of Machrihanish, Argyll and Bute, serving the town. The Campbeltown and Machrihanish Light Railway was a 2 ft 3 in (686 mm) narrow gauge railway in Kintyre, Scotland, between the towns of Campbeltown and Machrihanish.

== History ==
The station had a small wooden station building with a corrugated iron roof that slightly projected at the front to provide shelter, no platforms and only a run round loop for the locomotive. It was situated near the seaside village and the local hotel, now largely built over. The station site remains largely undeveloped.

Upgraded from a coal carrying mineral lined and opened for passenger traffic in 1906, the railway did not have stations as such, just places where the train halted to pick up passengers. Many of the passengers were day trippers from Glasgow as a turbine steamer would bring passengers to Campbeltown early enough to catch a train to Machrihanish and allow a return journey all in one day. The next stop on the railway was Trodigal Halt.

Only three other passenger-carrying lines in the UK operated on the same gauge, all of them in Wales - the Corris Railway, the short-lived Plynlimon and Hafan Tramway and the Talyllyn Railway.

Preceding station	Disused railways	Following station
Trodigal Halt	Campbeltown to Machrihanish; Campbeltown and Machrihanish Light Railway	Terminus
