= Lewis Cozens =

British railway author and historian

Henry Lewis Cozens
- Born: 1909; Edmonton, London, England
- Died: 24 April 1968; Newtown, Powys, Wales
- Occupations: Author, historian

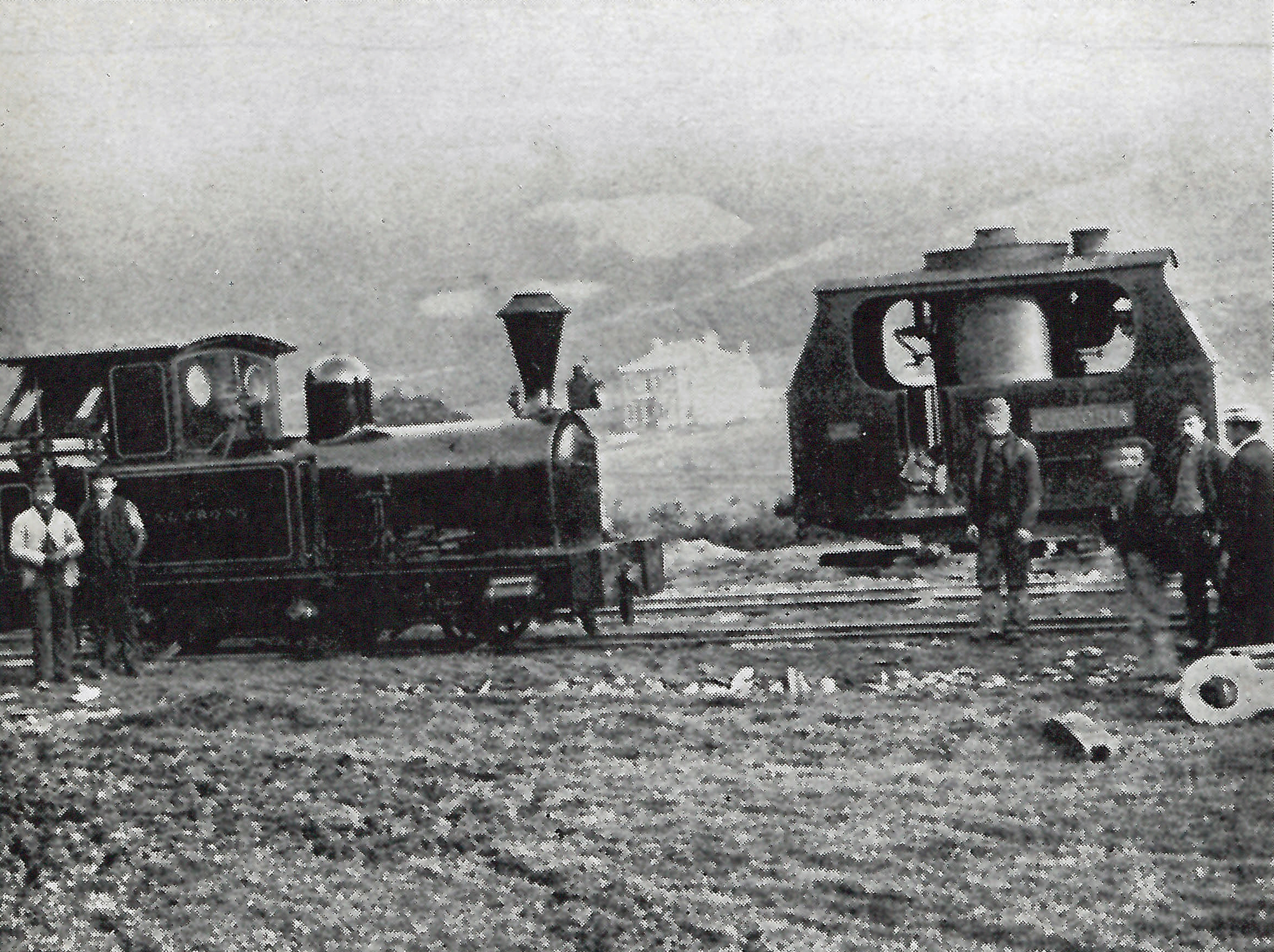
Plynlimon and Hafan Tramway locomotives Talybont and Victoria, this photograph first appeared in Cozens' book on the Tramway

Lewis Cozens (full name Henry Lewis Cozens) was a British railway author and historian, notable as one of the earliest writers on Welsh narrow gauge and light railways.

== Biography ==
Cozens was born in Edmonton, Middlesex in 1909, the son of James Henry Theodore Charles Cozens and Mary Margarite Cozens (née Jones). He was a bank clerk by profession and his family came from the Welsh county of Montgomeryshire. He married Elizabeth Kindlberger in London in 1939.

In 1935, Cozens' mother Mary died, leaving £145 to Lewis and his brother David. In 1939, his father a civil servant also died, leaving Lewis £150 in his will. The unusual declaration in the will was reported in the Birmingham Daily Post, it said the bequest was "in view of the fact that I paid no premium for his career and he was no charge to me from the age of eighteen".

During his holidays in Wales before and after World War II, he explored the many minor railways of mid Wales. As early as 1944, Cozens was actively researching the history of the Plynlimon and Hafan Tramway. In that year he began a correspondence with Selwyn Pearce Higgins about the discovery of historical records of the Tramway. This led to the publication of Cozens' 1955 book on the Plynlimon and Hafan.

In 1949, he published the first of his histories on Welsh railways, about the Talyllyn Railway. These early books were self-published and were slim volumes, as printing paper was still rationed in the immediate post-war years. He soon followed with books on the Corris Railway, the Mawddwy Railway and other local lines. His books were the first serious attempt to publish histories of these railways and they introduced many early railway enthusiasts to them. Cozens was a friend of other notable early railway historians, including James Boyd, and R. W. Kidner. Cozens and Boyd have been described as the "eminent authors on the minor railways of North- and Mid-Wales".

Several of Cozen's early books were later expanded and republished. While many of his books have been superseded by more detailed histories, his work was influential on later authors and provided important early coverage of the subject.

== Works ==
- Cozens, Lewis (1949). The Tal-y-llyn Railway. self-published.
- —— (1949). The Corris Railway. self-published.
- —— (1950). The Vale of Rheidol Railway. self-published.
- —— (1951). The Welshpool and Llanfair Light Railway. self-published.
- —— (1952). The Axminster & Lyme Regis Light Railway with complementary road passenger services. self-published.
- —— (1953). The Van and Kerry Railways and the Kerry Tramway. self-published.
- —— (1954). The Mawddwy Railway with the Hendre-Ddu Tramway. self-published.
- —— (1955). The Plynlimon and Hafan Tramway. self-published.
- —— (1957). Aberayron Transport. self-published.
- —— (1959). The Llanfyllin Railway. self-published.
- —— (1972). The Mawddwy, Van and Kerry Railways (Combination of Cozen's Mawddwy and Van & Kerry books ed.). The Oakwood Press.
- —— (1980) [1949]. The Tal-y-llyn Railway (reprint of 1949 book ed.). Talyllyn Railway Preservation Society.
- —— (1992) [1949]. The Corris Railway (reprint of 1949 book ed.). Corris Railway Society.
- Cozens, L; Kidner, RW; Poole, B (2004). The Mawddwy, Van and Kerry Branches (version of Cozen's 1972 book with new material by Poole and Kidner ed.). The Oakwood Press.
