= David Adams (Congregationalist divine) =

Welsh Congregationalist (1845–1922)

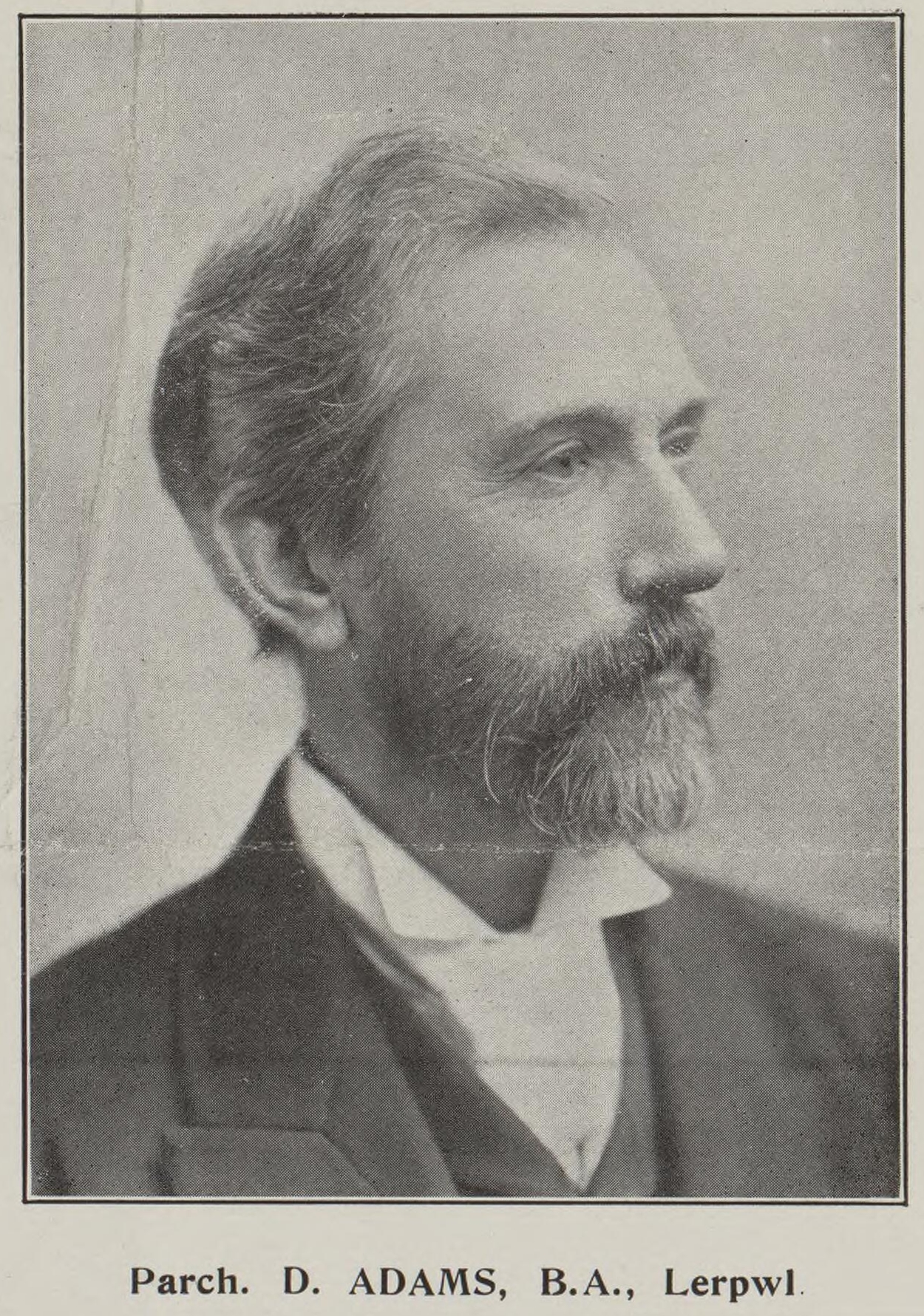
David Adams

David Adams (1845–1922) of Cardiganshire, Wales was a Congregationalist minister and schoolmaster. He promoted temperance, and stressed the ethical rather than the controversial aspects of Christianity. His published works include Paul yng Ngoleuni'r Iesu (1897) and Yr Eglwys a Gwareiddiad Diweddar (1914).

== Early life and education ==
David Adams was born at Tal-y-bont, Cardiganshire on 28 August 1845. His parents were Margaret and John Adams, who made boots and was a lay preacher. He attended the Llanfihangel grammar school. His education was interrupted when students were required to attend the Church of England. We worked in the lead mines for three years and then returned to school as a pupil teacher at Tal-y-bont. He attended Normal Colleges in Bangor and Swansea in the 1860s. He received a B.A. from University College Wales, Aberystwyth in 1877.

== Career ==
Adams began teaching at Bryn, Llanelly in 1867 and then was schoolmaster at Ystradgynlais from 1870 to 1872. He was ordained in 1878 at Hawen and Bryngwenith, Cardiganshire. Early in his career as a minister, he was a Sunday school catechist, promoted temperance, and won a prize for his essay on Georg Wilhelm Friedrich Hegel at the National Eisteddfod in Liverpool in 1884. He eschewed Calvinism and endeavored to "do away with the idea of contingency in theology and to substitute for it inevitability" and became a leader in the development of Welsh theology, according to E. Keri Evans, his biographer.

He moved to Bethesda, Caernarfonshire in 1888. Grounded in philosophy, poetry, and theology, his sermons focused on ethics. He wrote the prize-winning essay "Evolution in its relation to the Fall, the Incarnation, and the Resurrection" by 1893. He moved to Liverpool in 1895. Two years later his book Paul yng Ngoleuni'r Iesu, which further explored his viewpoints about ethics, was published. In 1914, he published his last book, Yr Eglwys a Gwareiddiad Diweddar.

He became chairman of the Union of Welsh Independents in 1913 and in 1922 learned that he would receive an honorary Doctorate in Divinity from the University of Wales. He died 5 July of that year, before he could receive the degree, and was buried at Tal-y-bont.

Author John Morgan-Guy said, "Morality was primary for Adams, and the Spiritual Christ more important than the Jesus of history."
