= List of 2 ft 3 in gauge railways =

An illustration of 2 ft 3 in (686 mm) track, in comparison with some other gauges used in Great Britain

In railway terminology, track gauge indicates the distance between the inside edges of the running rails. Standard gauge is defined as 1,435 mm (4 ft 8 1/2 in), and narrow gauge as any gauge less than that distance.

In Britain, standard gauge is used for all main line routes and the majority of urban light rail. Narrow gauge railways were constructed mainly where there was a need for tighter curves, smaller structure gauges, and lighter rails, as they could be less costly to build, equip and operate than standard gauge railways (particularly in mountainous or difficult terrain).

Narrow gauge railways in Britain used various gauges. 2 ft 3 in (686 mm) was relatively uncommon; in his book Railway Adventure, L. T. C. Rolt states that apart from the Talyllyn, the only public railways to use the gauge were the Corris and Campbeltown and Machrihanish railways. (Note: The Plynlimon and Hafan Tramway was also a public railway. Whether Rolt was unaware of this line, or chose to ignore it is unknown.) However there were several private railways, including mine and quarry railways, which used the gauge.

== List of 2 ft 3 in gauge railways ==
This list, whilst incomplete, details all railways that are believed to have used 2 ft 3 in (686 mm) gauge at some point during their existence.

=== United Kingdom ===
Name	Opened	Closed	Length	Location	Notes
Campbeltown and Machrihanish Light Railway	1877	1932	6 miles (9.7 km)	Mull of Kintyre, Scotland	Remote line serving coal mines and passengers on the Kintyre peninsula.
Caphouse Colliery	1988	present	c. 2,000 yards (1,800 m)	National Coal Mining Museum, Wakefield	Demonstration funicular railway.
Corris Railway (original)	1859	1948	12 1/4 miles (19.7 km)	Machynlleth, Wales	Built to carry slate from the Corris district. Closed after flooding of the Afon Dyfi.
Corris Railway (preserved)	2002	present	c. 1 mile (1.6 km)	Corris, Wales	Runs from Corris to Maespoeth Junction with new build steam locomotives based on two of the original locomotives.
Galltymoelfre Tramway	c. 1865	c. 1946	c. 1/2 mile (0.8 km)	Abergynolwyn, Wales	A horse-drawn tramway that connected Bryn Eglwys quarry to the Talyllyn Railway via an incline at each end.
Glasgow Royal Infirmary Railway	c. 1910	c. 1920	c. 400 feet (120 m)	Glasgow, Scotland	Railway underground in the basement of the Glasgow Royal Infirmary. Operated by a battery-electric locomotive, and carried laundry. Closed following an accident in 1920, but sections of rail are still visible in the basement.
Glyn Valley Tramway	Under construction	present	unknown	Chirk	Part of the former 2 ft 4 1/2 in (724 mm) tramway is being rebuilt as a 2' 3" gauge line at Chirk in North Wales.
Hendra China Stone Quarry	1860s	after 1967	Unknown	Nanpean, England	Internal quarry tramway system with cable hauled inclines.
Huncoat Colliery	Unknown	1968?	Unknown	Huncoat, England	National Coal Board mine railway. One diesel was sold to the Talyllyn Railway, and runs as No. 9 Alf.
Lord quarry	c. 1820s	Unknown	Unknown	Blaenau Ffestiniog	There is evidence that Lord quarry (later part of the Votty & Bowydd quarry complex) and other North Wales slate quarries used 2 ft 3 in gauge tramways in the 1820s.
Plynlimon and Hafan Tramway	1897	1899	7 miles (11.3 km)	Talybont, Wales	Short-lived line serving the lead mines around Hafan.
Ratgoed Tramway	1864	1952	1 3/4 miles (2.8 km)	Aberllefenni, Wales	A horse-drawn tramway connected to the Corris Railway.
Quarry Close China Stone Works	1863	1973	Unknown	Nanpean, England	A network of lines connecting several quarries to the GWR branch line from Drinnick Mill.
Talyllyn Railway	1865	present	7 1/4 miles (11.7 km)	Tywyn, Wales	Built to carry slate from Bryn Eglwys quarry to the coast.
Upper Corris Tramway	1859	1927	1.9 miles (3.1 km)	Corris, Wales	A horse-drawn tramway connected to the Corris Railway.
York Gasworks Company	1915	1959	c. 400 feet (120 m)	York, England	Electrified railway, operated by a locomotive built by Dick, Kerr & Co.

=== United States ===
Name	Opened	Closed	Length	Location	Notes
Jazwieck’s Golfette and Trainland	1955	1994	unknown	Everett, Washington	Attraction at a mall, built using ex-mining equipment.

== Similar gauges ==
A number of 700 mm (2 ft 3 9/16 in) gauge railways existed in Latvia, the Netherlands and Romania, as well as on several Cuban sugar cane railways.

Other British railways of similar, but not identical, gauge were:

- Snailbeach District Railways, 2 ft 4 in (711 mm) gauge
- Welbeck Colliery, Nottinghamshire, 2 ft 4 in (711 mm) gauge, which closed in 2010.
- Glyn Valley Tramway, 2 ft 4 1/2 in (724 mm) gauge

== See also ==
- British narrow-gauge railways
