= Rheidol (locomotive) =

Former narrow gauge steam locomotive

Treze de Maio; Talybont; Rheidol
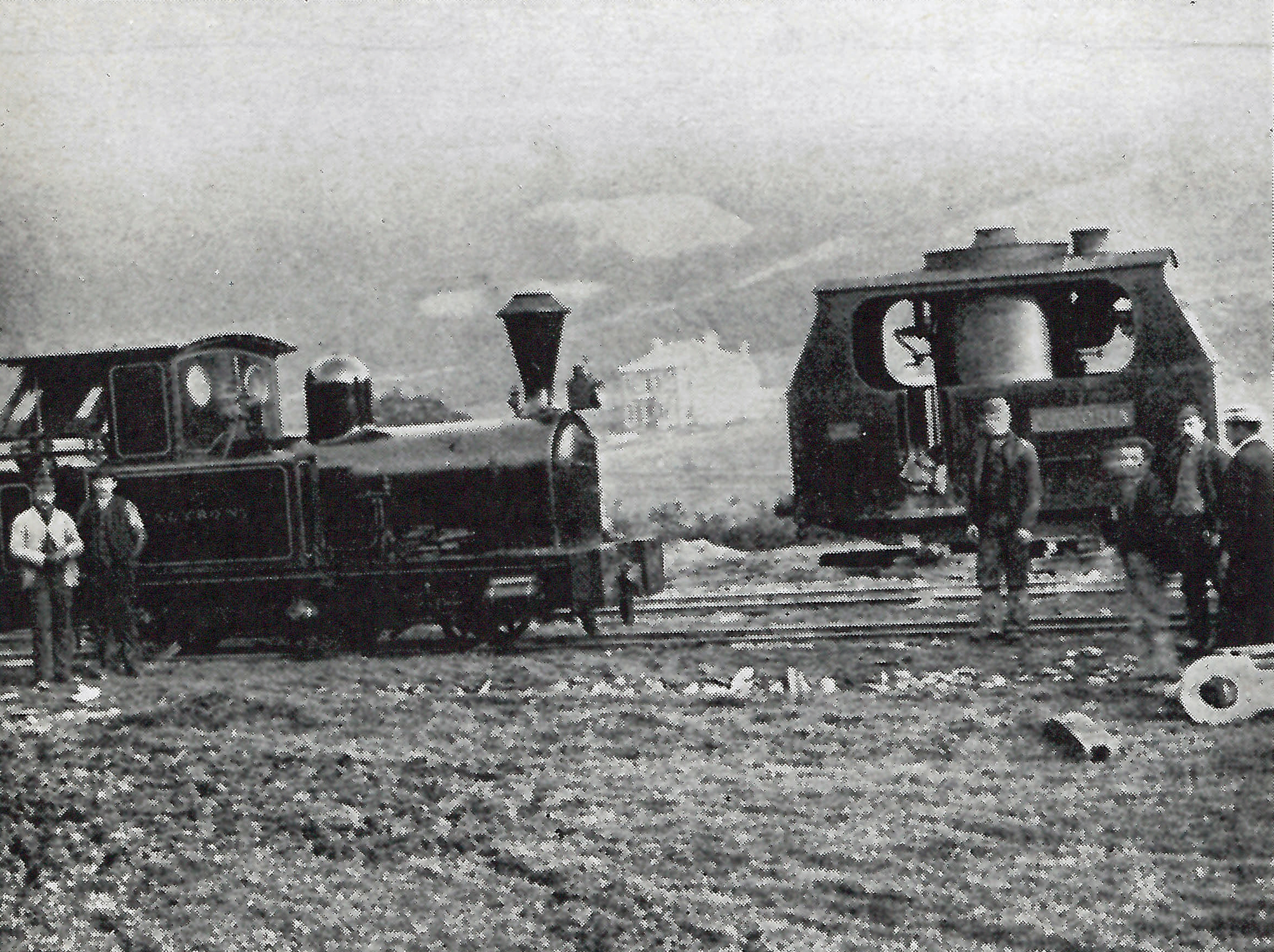
- Talybont (left) with Victoria on the Plynlimon and Hafan Tramway
Type and origin
- Power type: Steam
- Builder: W. G. Bagnall
- Serial number: 1497
- Build date: 1896
- Total produced: 1
- Rebuilder: W. G. Bagnall
- Rebuild date: 1897; 1900
Specifications
- Configuration
  - Whyte: 2-4-0T
- Gauge: 2 ft 5 1/2 in (750 mm) (1896–1897); 2 ft 3 in (686 mm) (1897–1899); 1 ft 11 3/4 in (603 mm) (1900–1924)
- Leading dia.: 1 ft 3 1/3 in (0.389 m)
- Coupled dia.: 2 ft 2 1/2 in (0.673 m)
- Wheelbase: 9 ft 6 in (2.90 m)
  - Coupled: 5 ft (1.5 m)
- Length: 16 ft 9 in (5.11 m)
- Width: 6 ft 4 in (1.93 m)
- Frame type: Inside plate frames
- Loco weight: 10 long tons (10.2 t)
- Fuel type: Coal
- Water cap.: 225 imp gal (1,020 L; 270 US gal)
- Firebox
  - Type: Round-topped
  - Grate area: 5 3/8 sq ft (0.50 m^{2})
- Boiler
  - Tube plates: 6 ft 9 in (2.06 m)
- Boiler pressure: 140 lbf/in^{2} (0.97 MPa)
- Cylinders: Two, outside
- Cylinder size: 8 in × 11 1/2 in (200 mm × 290 mm) (formerly 12 in (300 mm) stroke)
- Valve gear: Baguley
- Valve type: Slide
- Train brakes: Vacuum (1904–1924)
Performance figures
- Tractive effort: 3,245 lbf (14.43 kN) (1897–1899); 2,863 lbf (12.74 kN) (1900–1923)
Career
- Operators: Plynlimon and Hafan Tramway (1897–1899); Vale of Rheidol Railway (1900–1924)
- Number in class: 1
- Numbers: 3 (1900–1923); 1198 (not carried, allocated for 1923–1924)
- Locale: Ceredigion
- Delivered: 1897
- Withdrawn: 1923
- Scrapped: 1924

Rheidol, formerly named Treze de Maio and Talybont, was a one-off 2-4-0T steam locomotive built by W.G. Bagnall in Staffordshire, England, in 1896. Originally built to a gauge of 2 ft 5 1/2 in (750 mm), it was for a Brazilian sugar plantation, however the order was cancelled before it was exported. The locomotive was then regauged and renamed for the 2 ft 3 in (686 mm)-gauge Plynlimon and Hafan Tramway, in Wales, where it worked from August 1897 until 1899. It was then regauged and renamed a second time for 1 ft 11 3/4 in (603 mm)-gauge Vale of Rheidol Railway, in 1900. It worked on the Vale of Rheidol until 1924, when it was scrapped.

== Construction ==
The locomotive was originally built by W. G. Bagnall in 1896, following an order for a 2 ft 5 1/2 in (750 mm) gauge locomotive for a sugar plantation in Brazil. The locomotive was named Treze de Maio (Portuguese for "Thirteenth of May"), the date in 1888 that Brazil abolished slavery. It was a 2-4-0T locomotive with outside frames, and fitted with a spark arresting chimney. It was completed and named by February 1897, but the order was cancelled before the loco was exported. This may have been due to a political uprising in Brazil, though this is disputed by railway historian E. A. Wade.

== Plynlimon and Hafan Tramway ==
The Plynlimon and Hafan Tramway was a short-lived 2 ft 3 in (686 mm) gauge railway built in 1897, operating from Llanfihangel via Talybont to serve lead mines on the western slopes of Plynlimon. The railway's first locomotive, Victoria, was of an unusual design, and not sufficiently powerful to operate on the railway, and the owners of the line approached Bagnall to provide a new locomotive urgently. Bagnall also supplied their works number 1510, Hafan, to work the upper section of the tramway. As Treze de Maio was available, it was regauged and renamed Talybont, and delivered to the Plynlimon and Hafan Tramway in August 1897, still with its spark arresting chimney.

The Plynlimon and Hafan Tramway was not an economic success, and closed in 1899, just two years after opening. Talybont was then sold back to Bagnalls.

== Vale of Rheidol Railway ==
The Vale of Rheidol Railway is a 1 ft 11 3/4 in (603 mm) railway that operates between Aberystwyth and Devil's Bridge, a few miles south of the Plynlimon and Hafan Tramway. Construction started in 1900, and Talybont was sold to Pethick Bros of Plymouth, the contractors working on the railway. The locomotive underwent a second change of gauge, and modification work was also carried out to its cylinders. After completion of the Vale of Rheidol in 1902, the locomotive was returned to Bagnalls for further modifications, before it was named Rheidol and became the railway's No. 3. It was the only locomotive small enough to work the railway's Harbour Branch.

In 1904, Rheidol was fitted with a conventional chimney, and at some point was fitted with a steel cab back. The Vale of Rheidol Railway was taken over by the Great Western Railway (GWR) in 1923 and the locomotive was allocated the number 1198. It was withdrawn in 1923 and scrapped at Swindon Works in 1924, having never carried its GWR number.

== See also ==
- List of Vale of Rheidol Railway rolling stock
