= Wynne Davies =

Welsh pony breeder, judge, author and historian

Wynne Davies MBE
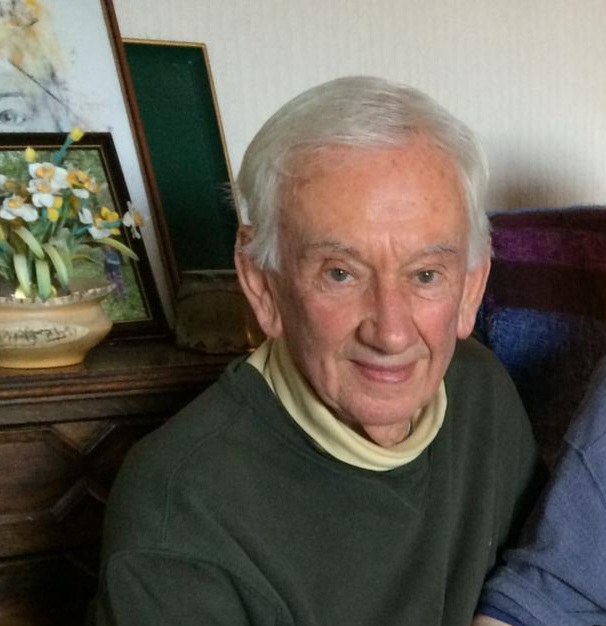
- Born: Edgar Wynne Davies; 19 March 1932; Tal-y-bont, Ceredigion, Wales
- Died: 7 December 2021 (aged 89)
- Other names: Dr Wynne; The Doc
- Education: Aberystwyth University
- Occupations: Author, pony breeder, judge, historian, teacher
- Spouse: Ruth Williams (m. 1961)
- Children: 2

Edgar Wynne Davies MBE (19 March 1932 - 7 December 2021) was a Welsh author, teacher, historian, judge and breeder of Welsh ponies. His book Welsh Ponies and Cobs (1980) was the first major publication on the subject. He was the first Welsh person to receive The Showing World's lifetime outstanding achievement award at the Horse of the Year Show in 2012. He set a new record for the oldest person to "trot up at horse" at the Royal Welsh Show in 2015.

== Personal life, education and career ==
Davies was born in Tal-y-bont, Ceredigion to Evan Samuel Davies and Janet Mary née Williams. He earned a PhD in spectrophotometric and kinetic studies of complex salt solutions from Aberystwyth University in 1957. He married Ruth Williams in 1961. They moved to Ceulan Farm in Miskin, Pontyclun in 1962. They had two children.

Davies taught chemistry at Rhondda Grammar School, Llandaff College and South Glamorgan Institute of Higher Education, which became the University of Wales Institute of Science and Technology, where he was head of chemistry and deputy head of department. He retired in 1989.

== Welsh ponies ==
Davies was a third-generation breeder of Welsh mountain ponies, Welsh ponies, Welsh ponies of cob type and Welsh cobs. He owned the Ceulan Stud in Pontyclun. Several of his ponies became champions, including:

- Dinarth What Ho – 1947 champion at Royal Welsh Show (RWS)
- Coed Cch Serliw – 1949 champion
- Ceulan Cariad – double RWS winner
- Ceulan Calon Lan – 2015 reserve supreme equine champion at RWS

=== Welsh Pony and Cob Society (WPCS) ===
Davies joined the Welsh Pony and Cob Society (WPCS) in 1948. He served on its council from 1955 to 2007, including being its president in 1984. He was also its publicity officer and historian. He served as a judge, both in the UK and abroad - including New Zealand, Australia, South Africa, Canada, USA and Europe.

=== Royal Welsh Show (RWS) ===
Davies became a commentator at the Royal Welsh Show (RWS) in 1976, moving to the main ring in 1980. He won the progeny class at the show a "record" 11 times. In 2015 he set a further record by being the "oldest person to trot up at horse" in the main ring, aged 83.

== Writing and publications ==
Davies wrote for Horse & Hound magazine from 1951 for 58 years. He edited the Welsh Pony and Cob Society Journal from 1992 to 2002. He also contributed to international Welsh Pony and Cob Society magazines.

Davies authored the following books:

- Welsh ponies and cobs. Wiltshire, UK: Crowood Press. 1980. ISBN 9780851313610.
- Welsh champions. Wiltshire, UK: J A Allen. 1984. ISBN 9780851313962.
- Welsh cob champions. Wiltshire, UK: J A Allen. 1985. ISBN 9780851314105.
- Welsh pony champions. Wiltshire, UK: J A Allen. 1988. ISBN 9780851314587.
- An introduction to Welsh ponies and cobs. Essex, UK: Whittet Books. 1993. ISBN 9781873580073.
- The Welsh Cob. Wiltshire, UK: J A Allen. 1998. ISBN 9780851317212.
- The Welsh Mountain Pony. Wiltshire, UK: J A Allen. 1999. ISBN 9780851315713.
- One hundred glorious years: The Welsh pony and cob society 1901-2001. Lampeter, UK: The Welsh Pony and Cob Society. 2001. ISBN 9780900439957.
- The early years: A collection of articles from the early Welsh stud book (Vol 1-15). Lampeter, UK: Welsh Pony and Cob Society. 2002.
- The Welsh Pony. Wiltshire, UK: J A Allen. 2006. ISBN 9780851318707.
- Sixty years of Royal Welsh Champions: A celebration of Welsh pony and cob champions. Wiltshire, UK: J A Allen. 2009. ISBN 9780851319551.
- Welsh ponies and cobs: Ceredigion champions. Llandysul, UK: Gomer Press. 2010. ISBN 9781848512030.
- From the horse's mouth: Dr Wynne's diaries. Llandysul, UK: Gomer Press. 2015. ISBN 9781785620362.

== Honours ==
Davies received the following honours:

- 1986: Fellow of the Royal Agricultural Society (FRAgS), in recognition of his service to the WPCS
- 1995: MBE
- 2002: Sir Bryner Jones Memorial Trophy, for his service to the RWS
- 2003: Honorary life governorship of the RWS
- 2012: The Showing World's Lifetime Outstanding Achievement Award, Horse of the Year Show
- 2021: Honorary life vice-president of the RWS
- 2021: RWS silver medal

== Other roles ==
Davies was chairman of the Welsh Agricultural Equine Association.
