= Lossit House =

- Location within Argyll and Bute
- 55.4191°N 5.7407°W
- Location: Machrihanish, Kintyre, Scotland

Listed Building – Category B
- Designated: 20 July 1971
- Reference no.: LB4917

Lossit House is a 19th-century house, located just to the south of Machrihanish on the Kintyre peninsula, Argyll and Bute, Scotland.

The house is the seat of the MacNeals of Lossit and Ugadale, and is protected as a category B listed building. Located in the grounds is an armorial stone that bears the arms and initials of Lachlan MacNeil and is dated 1683.
