= Y Lolfa =

Welsh printing and publishing company

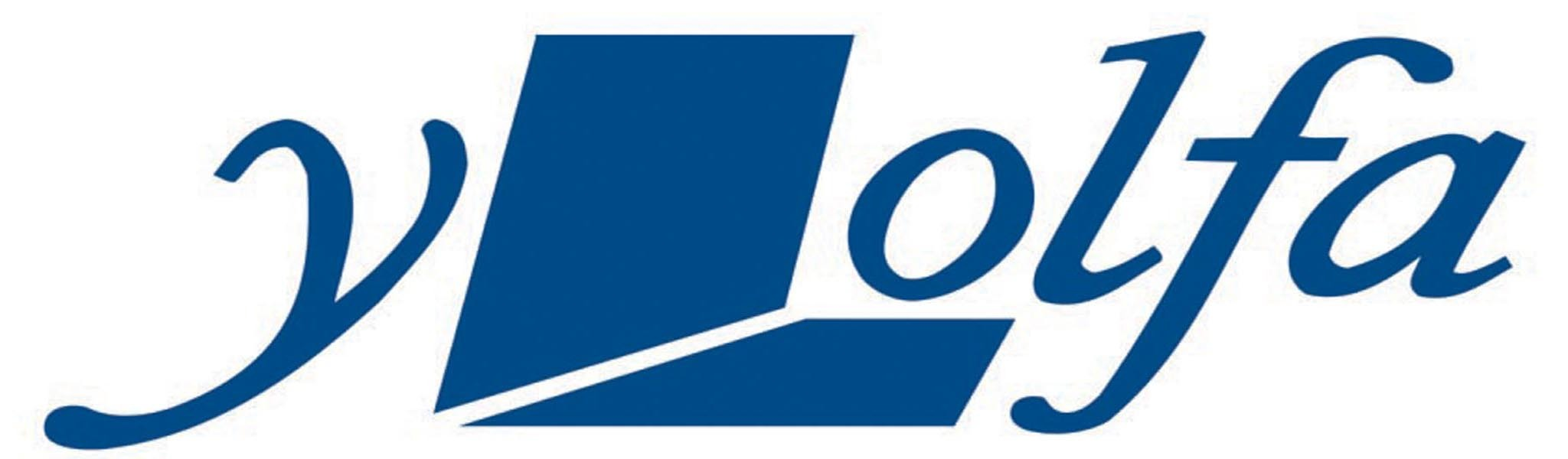
- Founded: 1967
- Founder: Robat Gruffudd
- Country of origin: United Kingdom
- Headquarters location: Tal-y-bont, Ceredigion, Wales
- Distribution: Welsh Books Council (Wales); Gardners Books (UK); Dufour Editions (US)
- Publication types: Books
- No. of employees: 22
- Official website: www.ylolfa.com

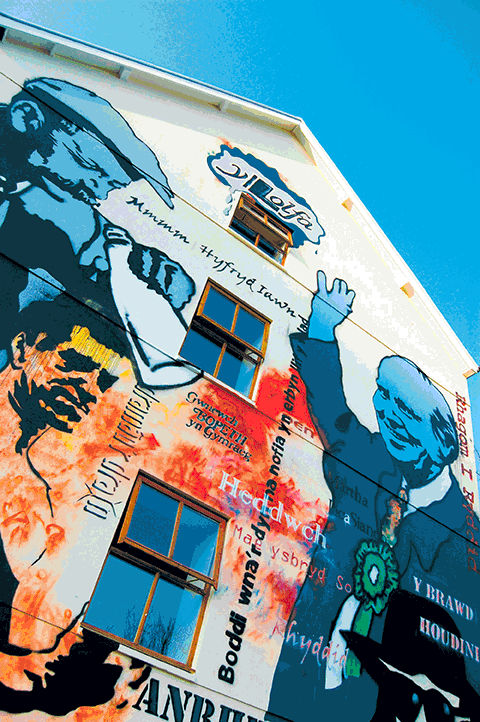
Y Lolfa building in Tal-y-bont with mural by local artist Ruth Jên

Y Lolfa (Welsh for The Lounge, Welsh pronunciation: [ə ˈlɔlva]) is a Welsh printing and publishing company based in Tal-y-bont, Ceredigion, in Mid-Wales. It publishes a wide variety of books in Welsh and English. It also provides a commercial print service. Y Lolfa was established in 1967 by Robat Gruffudd. It is now an independent, limited company run by the founder's sons, Garmon Gruffudd (managing director) and Lefi Gruffudd (head of publishing), with Paul Williams as production manager.

Using the new small offset printing method, the company began by producing material both for the activist Cymdeithas yr Iaith Gymraeg (The Welsh Language Society), with which it was loosely associated, and for its own publications which included Lol, the satirical magazine from which the company's name, meaning 'the lounge', was derived.

The company gradually expanded its range of publications to include popular series for children, contemporary novels, diaries, humorous courses for Welsh learners, a range for tourists to Wales and a line in Welsh sports titles. It has adopted a deliberate policy of not adapting books from other languages in order to support Welsh artists and authors.

It was involved with the publication of Papur Pawb, one of the first Welsh community papers, in 1974. It was also the first Welsh publishing company to launch its own website.

In 1999 Y Lolfa published Llyfr y Ganrif (The Book of the Century) in association with the National Library of Wales and in 2007 won the Welsh-language Book of the Year for the third consecutive year. In 2012 it bought out the Gomer Press list for adults in both languages, and now publishes around 80 titles annually, employing twenty-two full-time staff.

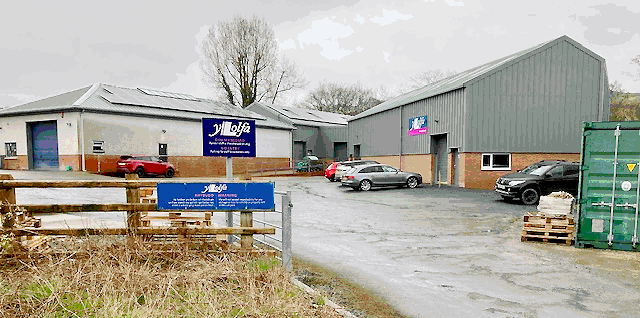
Y Lolfa warehouses in Tal-y-bont
