= Machrihanish Bay =

Embayment within Argyll and Bute, Scotland

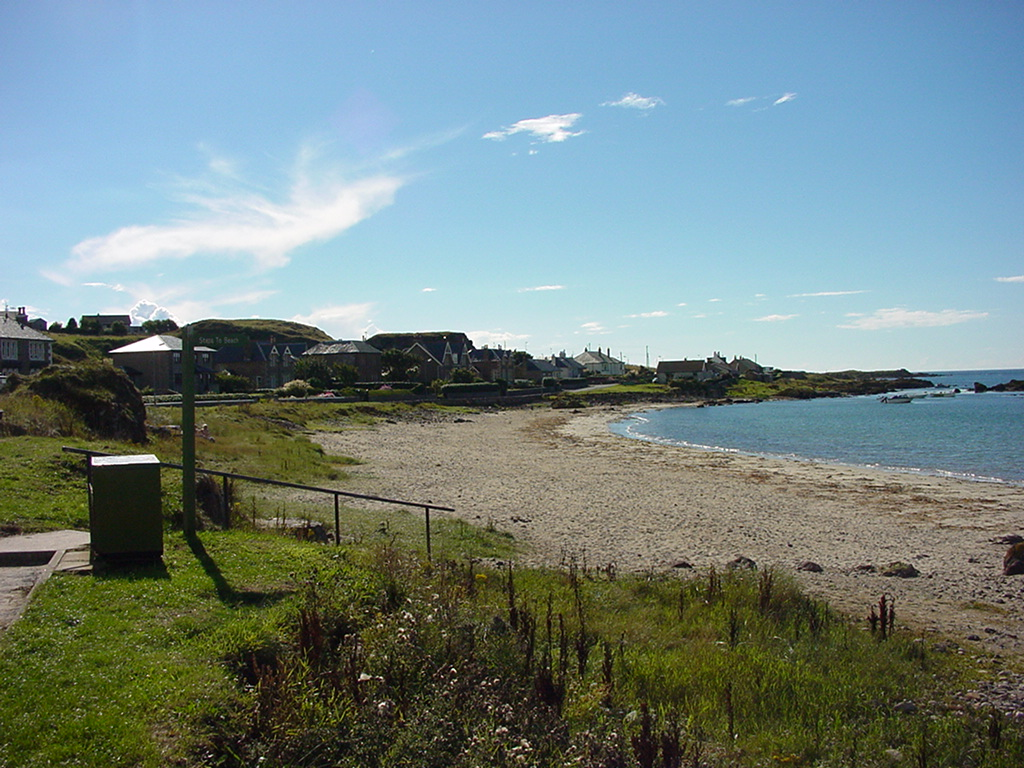
- Machrihanish Bay with headland of Machrihanish village.

- Location within Argyll and Bute
- Location: Argyll and Bute, Scotland
- Coordinates: 55°26′07.9296″N 5°44′1.1364″W
- Ocean/sea sources: Atlantic Ocean
- Basin countries: Scotland
- Max. length: 4 mi (6.4 km)
- Max. width: 3 mi (4.8 km)
- Average depth: 40 ft (12 m)

Machrihanish Bay is a large remote tidal north by northeast coastal facing embayment, located next to the Campbeltown Airport within Argyll and Bute, Scotland. It is located on the west coast of the Kintyre peninsula. Machrihanish Bay has the longest continuous stretch of sand in Argyll.

== Settlements ==
The closest settlement to Machrihanish Bay is the small village of Machrihanish which sits on the headland at the south end of the bay. Directly east of the bay sits Campbeltown Airport (RAF Machrihanish) and further east on the other side of the peninsula, a distance of 3 nautical miles (5.6 km; 3.5 mi) sits the town of Campbeltown. To the north of the airport and close to the northern shore of the bay, is the village of West Darlochan. The main A83 Road follows the west coast of the Kintyre peninsula, when traveling south, until it reaches the north coast of the bay, where it cuts east through the peninsula, to miss the airport, cutting through the small villages of Kilchenzie, Glencraigs, Drumore before finally meeting Campbeltown. The B842 road leaves Campbeltown traveling in a westerly direction, and passes through the small village of Stewarton, before reaching the bay as the B843.

== Geography ==
To the north of the bay, around 2.3 nautical miles (4.3 km; 2.6 mi) lies Bellochantuy Bay. To the south of the bay, 1 nautical mile (1.9 km; 1.2 mi), lies Earadale Point, where the peninsula starts to curve inwards to the east. To the south of the bay lies the forested hill of The Slate, with the larger hill of Cnoc May which overlooks the bay, 4 miles to the northeast. The river Machrihanish Water flows into the bay.

== Gallery ==
Images of Machrihanish Bay

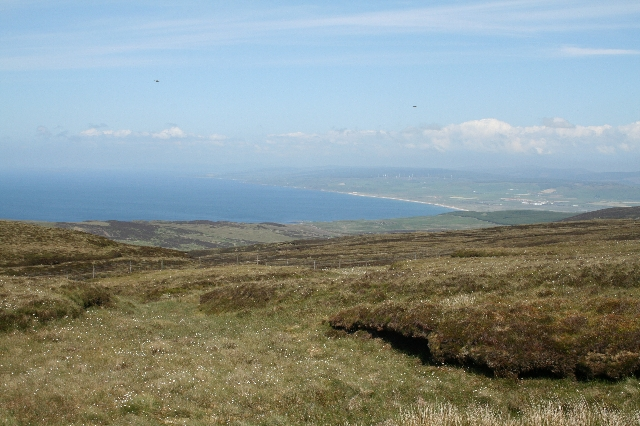
Machrihanish Bay. Looking on from Cnoc Moy.

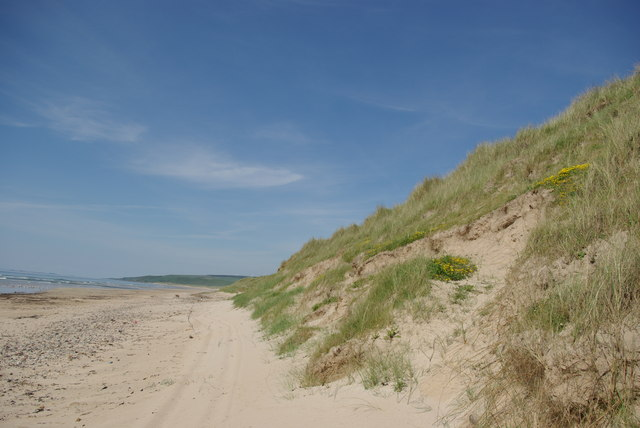
Beach & dunes at Machrihanish Bay.

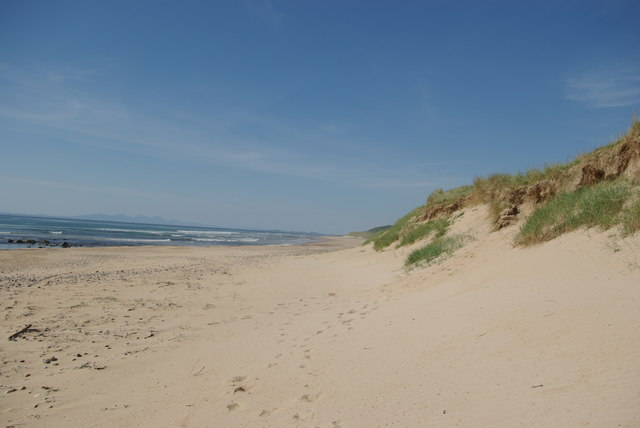
Beach & dunes.

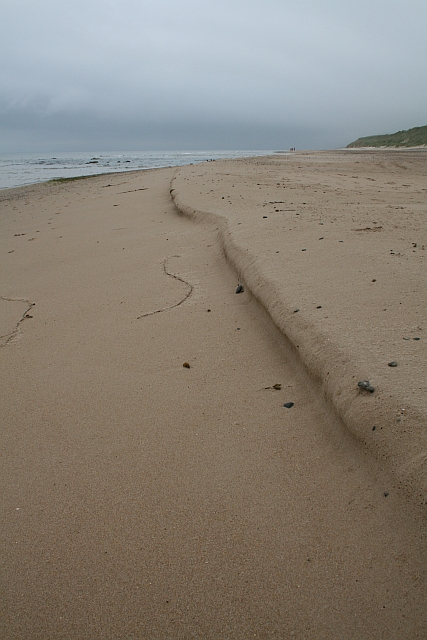
Beach at Machrihanish Bay, looking north.

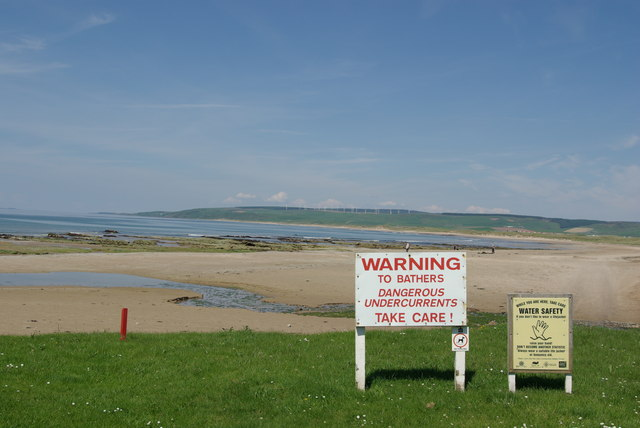
Information boards at Machrihanish Bay
