= Campbeltown and Machrihanish Light Railway =

Former railway line in Scotland

Coordinates: 55.42093°N 5.67718°W

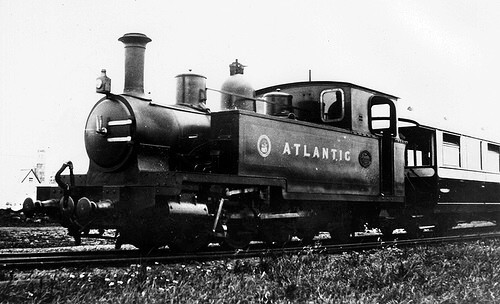
- 'Atlantic', the last locomotive built for the railway, Andrew Barclay 0-6-2T, builder's photograph, 1907

Overview
- Headquarters: Campbeltown
- Locale: Scotland
- Dates of operation: 1876–1932
- Successor: abandoned

Technical
- Track gauge: 2 ft 3 in (686 mm)

The Campbeltown and Machrihanish Light Railway was a 2 ft 3 in (686 mm) narrow-gauge railway in Kintyre, Scotland, between Campbeltown and the coalmining village of Machrihanish. Only three other passenger-carrying lines in the UK operated on the same gauge, all of them in Wales - the Corris Railway, the short-lived Plynlimon and Hafan Tramway and the Talyllyn Railway.

== History ==
Coal has been mined on the Kintyre peninsula since 1498 or before. Although not the highest quality, the coal found there was abundant and relatively cheap to extract. In the middle of the eighteenth century the collieries of the area were kept busy supplying the many whisky distilleries in the Campbeltown area.

=== Canal ===
In 1773, James Watt surveyed a canal to connect the coal mines to Campbeltown to reduce the costs of transport. The 3-mile (4.8 km) Campbeltown and Machrihanish Canal was opened in 1791.

The canal fell into disuse and had been virtually abandoned by 1856. In 1875, the Argyll Coal and Canal Co. acquired the main colliery and found the canal in a state of disrepair. They decided a better transport system was required and began to investigate the building of a railway to Campbeltown.

=== Colliery railway ===
As rail transport developed in the 19th century, the colliery owners sought to build a tramway to replace the canal. In 1876 a lightly constructed industrial railway was built connecting Kilkivan Pit to Campbeltown, a distance of 4 1/2 miles (7.24 km). For a short length the line ran on the formation of the canal before reaching Campbeltown, where it ended on a pier.

The colliery railway only ever carried coal traffic and used two locomotives, Princess and Chevalier to haul the trains of mine tubs.

=== Light railway ===
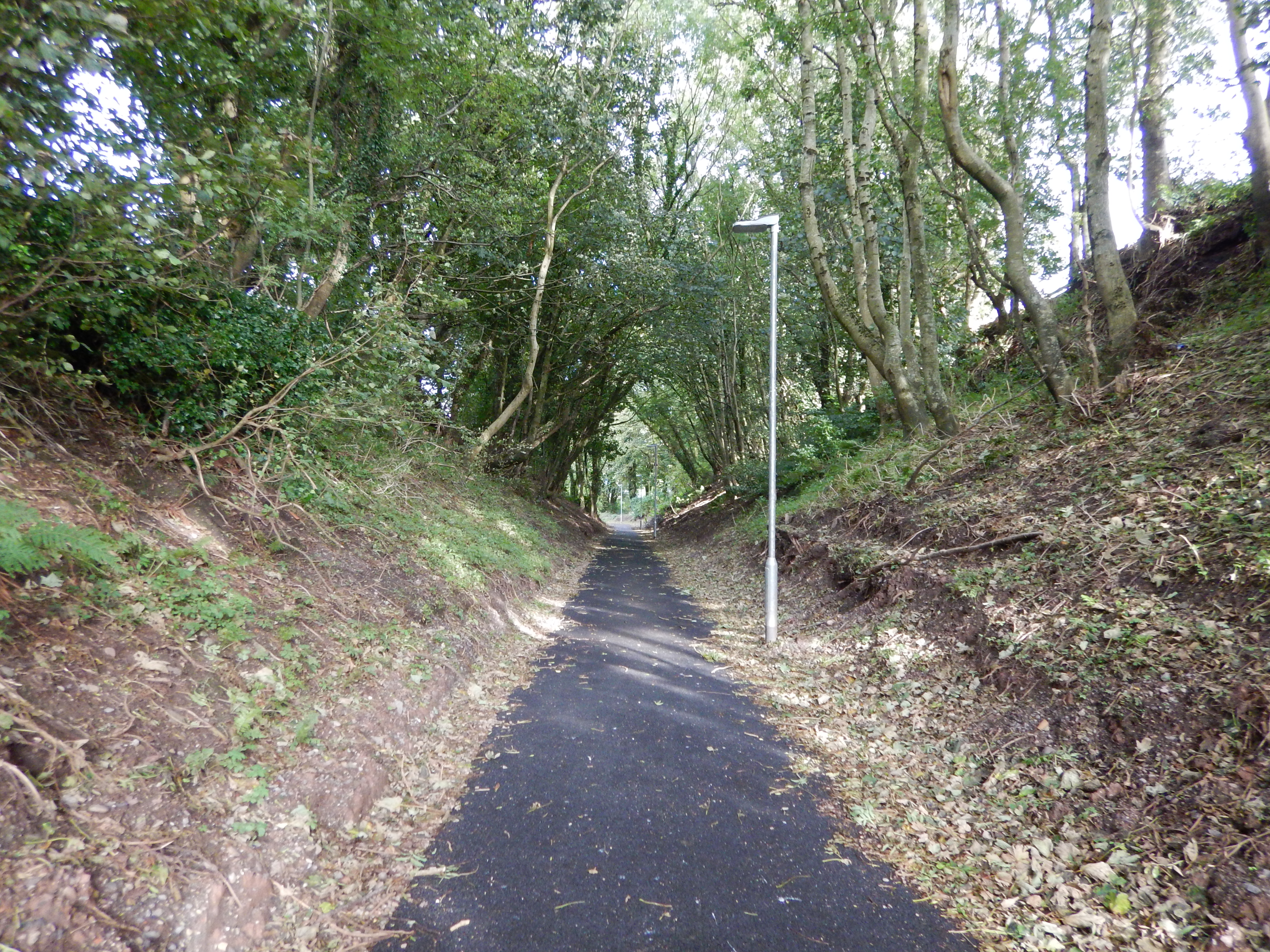
Former railway cutting in Campbeltown

The colliery railway's traffic was largely seasonal as most of the colliery output was consumed locally. Around the turn of the century the mine owners began to search for additional traffic for the summer season. At the same time, new steam ships made travel to the Kintyre peninsula more convenient. This led to the formation of the Association of Argyll Railway Co. Ltd. which applied for an order under the Light Railways Act 1896 to build a railway connecting Campbeltown with Machrihanish, on the west coast of the peninsula, and were granted the Campbeltown and Machrihanish Light Railway Order 1905.

Construction of the Campbeltown and Machrihanish Light Railway began in November 1905. The majority of the route of the new railway followed the colliery tramway, but with several of the steeper gradients and sharper curves eased. The colliery line was also extended west to the new terminus at Machrihanish. The work was completed in 1906 and the railway opened on 18 August 1906. It was an immediate success, attracting 10,000 passengers in its first three weeks of operation and replacing the horse-drawn tourist charabanc traffic in Campbeltown.

In the years leading up to the First World War, the railway thrived on a mixture of coal and passenger traffic. After the war, competition from new motor buses began to reduce the railway's profitable tourist trade. By 1931 the summer tourist trade had dwindled significantly. Passenger trains ran in early 1932, but the railway was failing and it abandoned passenger services in May 1932. By November 1933 the railway had been wound up and in May 1934 the last trains ran, assisting in the scrapping of the line.

=== Maisel Oil Company ===
According to Davies, both the railway and the colliery were acquired about 1929 by the Maisel Oil Company, which had a patent for a process to produce oil from coal. This concern was not successful and the line closed to passengers in September 1931 and to all traffic in November 1932.

Macmillan gives a slightly different version:

"In June (1928) the Franco British Co. acquired the Argyll colliery and at a Campbeltown Town Council meeting on 13th August, Mr. Maisel, a director, said that gas could be got from a proposed coal distillation plant and bought by the town. A report to the shareholders stated that a testing plant of the Aicher low temperature carbonisation process had been in operation for a fortnight, under the supervision of Mr. Aicher. Tests gave yields of between 34½ and 74 gallons of crude oil per ton of coal [154–331 L/t or 37–79 US gal/short ton]. In addition 2350 cubic feet/ton [65.5 m^{3}/t or 2,100 cu ft/short ton] of gas and the residual coke were available from the process. In June 1929 the Franco British Company re-emerged as the Coal Carbonisation Trust and their prospectus mentioned carbonising 1,000 tons [1,016 t or 1120 short tons] of coal per day yielding 11 cwt of coke per ton [550 kg/t]. Almost immediately afterwards the pit at Kilkivan was abandoned and the whole project 'melted like snow aff a dyke'."

It seems that there was some concern about the company's conduct and a question was asked about the matter in Parliament on 14 February 1933.

=== Accident ===
On 9 August 1910, there was a fatal accident when a train being stabled in the Linecraigs engine sidings collided with an engine already in the sidings. A cleaner, G. Jamieson, engaged in cleaning the standing engine, was knocked down by his engine, run over, and killed. The cause of the accident was the irregular use of a key to unlock the electric token instruments. This practice was authorised by A. Black, the superintendent of the line. He stated at the Board of Trade Inquiry into the accident that the reason for this practice was a desire to save the expense connected with the wear of the batteries that supplied power to the tablet instruments. This was achieved by suspending tablet working until 9 am, as prior to that hour, there was only one engine in steam in use on the line, and the suspension of tablet working enabled the batteries to be overhauled and cleaned.

== Rolling stock ==
=== Locomotives ===
Name	Photograph	Builder	Wheel arrangement (Whyte notation)	Works Number	Built	Notes
Pioneer		Andrew Barclay & Sons Co.	0-4-0WT (converted to 0-4-2WT)	unknown	1876	Delivered for the original colliery railway; never ran on the C&MLR.
Chevalier		Andrew Barclay & Co	0-4-0ST (converted to 0-4-2ST)	269	1885	Rebuilt in 1926 using parts from Princess
Princess		Kerr, Stuart & Co.	0-4-2T	717	1900	Skylark class, scrapped before 1931
Argyll		Andrew Barclay & Sons Co.	0-6-2T	1049	1906	
Atlantic		Andrew Barclay & Sons Co.	0-6-2T	1098	1907	Identical design to Argyll.

=== Passenger stock ===
R. Y. Pickering and Co. of Wishaw supplied four passenger bogie carriages for the line in 1906. Each carriage had a central saloon with wooden tramway style seating for 64 passengers and open end platforms. Two further carriages were supplied by Pickering in 1907, the second of which had a central luggage compartment.

The carriages survived the closure of the line and in 1934 were moved to Trench Point on the other side of Campbeltown Loch where they were used as holiday homes. During the Second World War, they were used by the Admiralty. After the war they were left to deteriorate until the remaining underframes were finally scrapped in 1958.

There are six saloon coaches on the 15 in (381 mm) gauge Ravenglass & Eskdale Railway in Cumbria which are based on the exterior designs of the Campbeltown passenger stock, built in 1989 and 1990 for the Gateshead Garden Festival.

=== Freight stock ===
==== Colliery railway ====
The colliery railway likely used mine tubs from the collieries' internal lines when it opened in 1876. By 1902, 18 four-wheeled flat wagons were in use, each of which carried four "mine hutches". The hutches were small mine tubs, each of which carried 9 1/2 long hundredweight (480 kg) of coal. The hutches were mounted transversely on short lengths of rail on the main railway wagons.

==== Light railway ====
With the rebuilding of the colliery line in 1906, the opportunity was taken to replace the hutch carrying wagons with more conventional stock. A set of 3 1/4-long-ton (3.6-short-ton; 3.3 t) four-wheel open-sided coal wagons were purchased from Hurst Nelson & Co. Ltd. of Motherwell. Like the earlier colliery wagons, these had dumb buffers and centre couplings. Later batches of wagons were built to a 4 1/2-long-ton (5.0-short-ton; 4.6 t) design. In all the railway used approximately 150 coal wagons, all owned by the Campbeltown Coal Co. rather than the railway.

In addition to the coal wagons, the railway company also had other freight stock. A 7-long-ton (7.8-short-ton; 7.1 t) brake van was supplied by R.Y. Pickering. The same company supplied an open-sided milk wagon based on the design for the 4 1/2-long-ton (4.6 t) wagon but with open spars extending above the sides to provide extra support for carrying milk churns. The railway also had a detachable snow plough and a small platelayers' trolley for maintenance work.

== Stations ==
None of the stations had platforms, however a small wooden shed with a corrugated iron roof was present at Machrihanish. The stations and halts were located at Campbeltown, Plantation Halt, Moss Road Halt, Lintmill Halt, Colliery Road, Drumlemble Halt, Machrihanish Farm Halt, Trodigal Halt and Machrihanish.

== See also ==
- List of 2 ft 3 in gauge railways
- British narrow gauge railways
