= Tal-y-bont, Ceredigion =

Village in Ceredigion, Wales

Coordinates: 52.486°N 3.982°W

Tal-y-bont
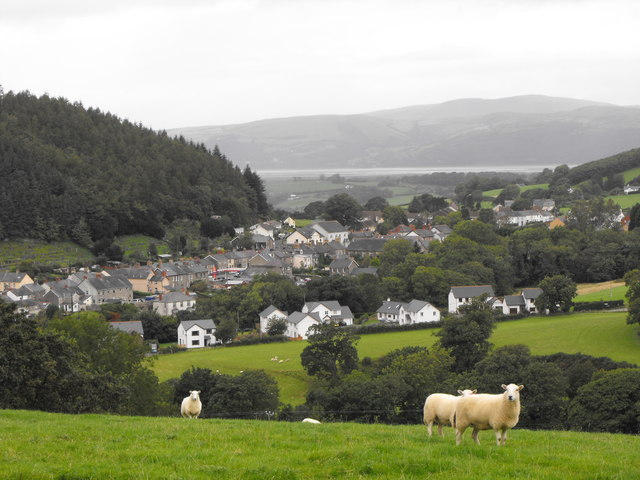
- Tal-y-bont, looking towards the Dyfi estuary

- Location within Ceredigion
- Population: 662
- OS grid reference: SN6589
  - Cardiff: 90 mi (140 km)SE
- Principal area: Ceredigion
- Preserved county: Dyfed
- Country: Wales
- Sovereign state: United Kingdom
- Post town: TALYBONT
- Postcode district: SY24
- Dialling code: 01970
- Police: Dyfed-Powys
- Fire: Mid and West Wales
- Ambulance: Welsh
- UK Parliament: Ceredigion Preseli
- Senedd Cymru – Welsh Parliament: Ceredigion Penfro

Tal-y-bont (Welsh pronunciation: [ˌtal ə ˈbɔnt]; also spelled as Talybont) is a village in Ceredigion, Wales, located on the A487 road about halfway between Aberystwyth and Machynlleth. At the 2011 census the population was 662 with 63% born in Wales. Tal-y-bont is in the community of Ceulanamaesmawr.

== History ==
The village stands on the Afon Leri and the Afon Ceulan in the area of Genau'r Glyn, at the foot of Ceulan Maes-mawr (383 m (1,257 ft)). There are old silver and lead mines and woolen mills surrounding the village. Although silver and lead had been mined in the area since Roman times, it was not until the 19th century that the village began to grow dramatically; the terraces were built during this period for workers who migrated to the area. Many of the houses, for example the pharmacy, are listed buildings and maintain original features such as sliding sash windows. There were only 35 houses in Tal-y-bont in 1835; the majority were thatched roof cottages.

At one time, there were 15 shops, a garage, two banks and three Nonconformist chapels. The Tabernacl was built in 1812, Eglwys Dewi Sant (St David's Church) was built in 1909, and there is a Bethel, Capel yr Annibynwyr (Independent chapel). The Memorial Hall was officially opened on 6 August 1924 in remembrance of those who died during the First World War. Since 1966 the village has been home to Y Lolfa printers and publishers, which is a local employer, as well as to a garage, a pharmacy, a hairdresser and a SPAR convenience store.

There are two pubs in Tal-y-bont: Y Llew Gwyn (The White Lion) and Y Llew Du (The Black Lion). The Tal-y-bont annual agricultural show has been held in the Black Lion's old fields for several decades.

The village was briefly served by Tal-y-bont railway station on the Plynlimon and Hafan Tramway.

The village was twinned with Woodbridge near Ipswich, Suffolk in 1922.

== Education ==
The Welsh-medium primary school, Ysgol Gynradd Gymunedol Tal-y-bont, is located in the north of the village. It has about 100 pupils between 4 and 11 years old. There is also a part-time nursery school, and a Ti a Fi ("You and Me") group every Friday afternoon.

== Other industry and organisations ==
The village has an old people's society, a Young Farmers Club, Merched y Wawr (a women's organisation, literally "Daughters of the Dawn", and a branch of Plaid Cymru.

The Papur Bro Papur Pawb ("Everyone's paper") serves the Tal-y-bont, Taliesin and Tre'r Ddôl area, and is edited and printed in the village.

== Notable residents ==
- Lewis Thomas, (1832–1913), known as 'The Coal King of Queensland', Australia
- David Adams (1845–1922), a Congregationalist minister and schoolmaster.
- John James Williams (1869 in Taigwynion – 1954), a Welsh poet and Archdruid of the National Eisteddfod from 1936 to 1939.
- Thomas Richards MA, D.Litt., F.R.Hist.S (1878–1962), a Welsh historian, author and librarian.
- Wynne Davies MBE (1932-2021) author, teacher, historian, judge and breeder of Welsh ponies
- Mihangel Morgan (born 1955), novelist, lives near the village
- Ruth Jên (born 1964), a Welsh artist, works in the old shoe shop in the village, painted the Y Lolfa mural
- Dewi Jenkins, (born circa 1975), sheepdog trials Supreme Champion.

== Gallery ==
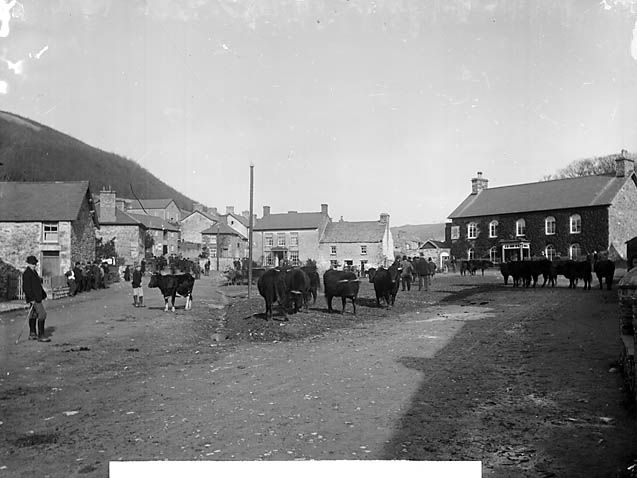
Cattle fair Tal-y-bont c. 1885

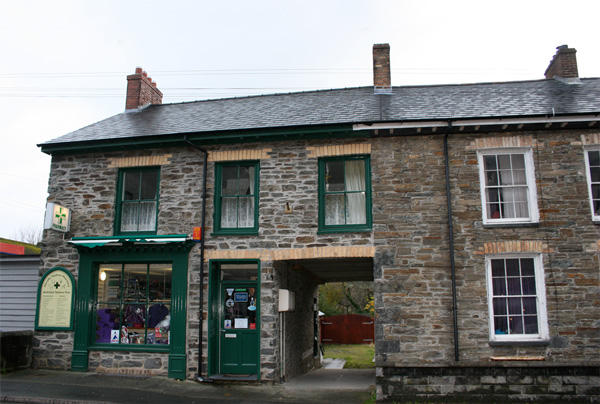
Tal-y-bont pharmacy (listed building)

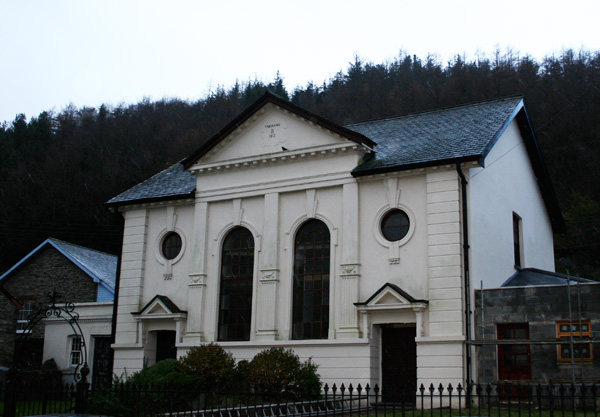
Tabernacl, Tal-y-bont

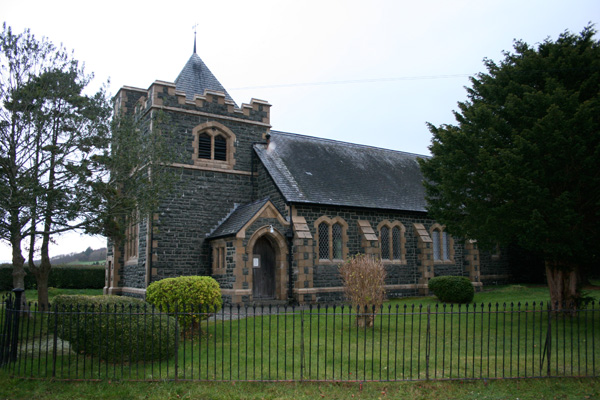
Eglwys Dewi Sant
Tal-y-bont

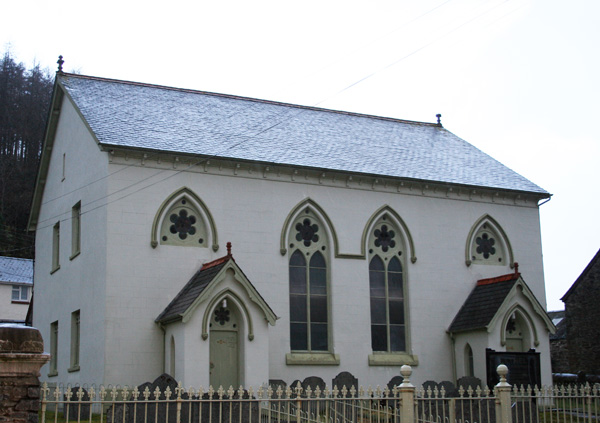
Bethel, Capel yr Annibynwyr, Tal-y-bont

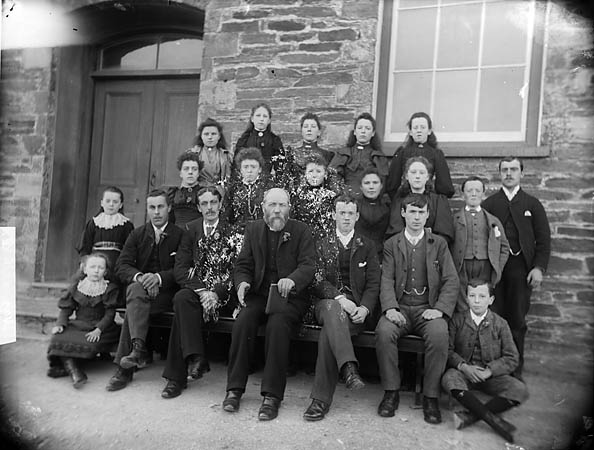
Bible class at Nazareth (CM) chapel, c. 1885
