= Machrihanish =

Coordinates: 55.423°N 5.736°W

Machrihanish: Scottish Gaelic: Machaire Shanais
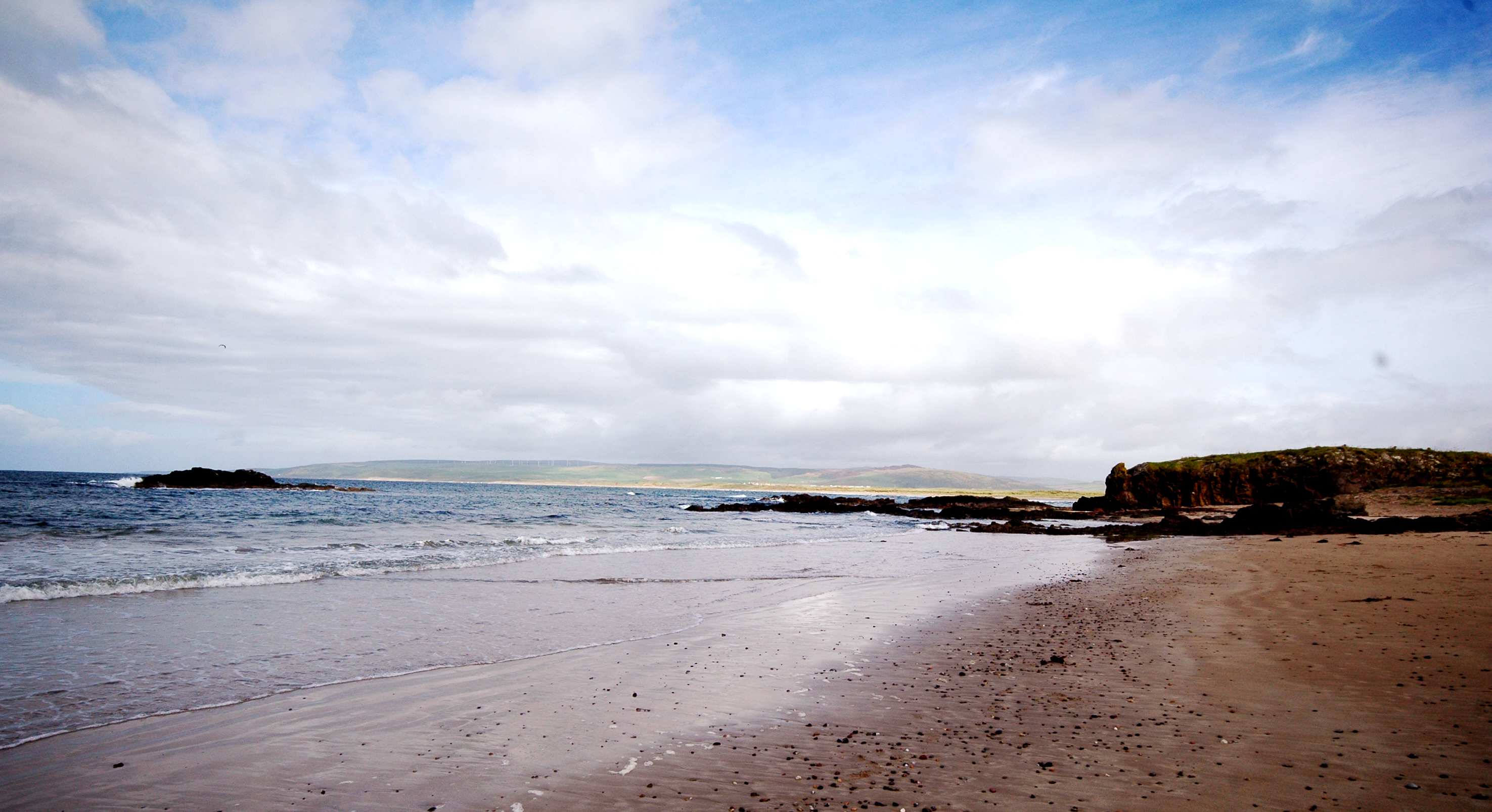
- Machrihanish Beach

- Location within Argyll and Bute
- OS grid reference: NR635207
- Council area: Argyll and Bute
- Country: Scotland
- Sovereign state: United Kingdom
- Post town: CAMPBELTOWN
- Postcode district: PA28
- Police: Scotland
- Fire: Scottish
- Ambulance: Scottish
- UK Parliament: Argyll, Bute and South Lochaber
- Scottish Parliament: Argyll and Bute

Machrihanish (Scottish Gaelic: Machaire Shanais, pronounced [ˈmaxɪɾʲə ˈhanɪʃ]) is a village in Argyll and Bute, on the west coast of Scotland. It is a short distance north of the tip of the Mull of Kintyre, which faces out towards Northern Ireland and the Atlantic.

== Machrihanish bay ==
The main sandy beach of Machrihanish Bay runs 3 miles (5 km) north to Westport, providing opportunities for surfing. Basic accommodation is available for surfing groups in the Machrihanish village hall. There are static caravans, wooden wigwams and camping spaces at the Machrihanish Holiday Park. The village is one of the start/finish points of the Kintyre Way, one of Scotland's Great Trails. The Scottish Wildlife Trust's Largiebaan nature reserve lies to the south, about 11 km (7 mi) along the Kintyre Way.

== Features ==
Campbeltown Airport, formerly RAF Machrihanish, is located near the village. Although still available to the Royal Air Force, the former airfield has been taken over by the specially-formed Machrihanish Airbase Community Company.

Coal was mined near the village; the Machrihanish Coalfield was one of Britain's smallest coalfields. A canal to Campbeltown was constructed between 1773 and 1794, later replaced by the narrow-gauge Campbeltown and Machrihanish Light Railway. Machrihanish railway station opened in 1906 and finally closed in 1932.

Machrihanish has a classic links golf course designed by Old Tom Morris, with views towards the islands of Gigha, Islay and Jura. A second, newer course has been built nearby called Machrihanish Dunes. This course is part of a multimillion-pound development by an American company, which has renovated the previously-dilapidated Ugadale Hotel in the village and owns the Royal Hotel on the sea front in nearby Campbeltown.

Weather data is collected from Machrihanish and broadcast in the Shipping Forecast.

== Notable people ==
Reginald Aubrey Fessenden built a radio transmitting station with a 415-foot (126 m) high mast there in 1905 to transmit Wireless Telegraphy to a similar station at Brant Rock in Massachusetts, United States. An exchange of messages took place on 1 January 1906 but the mast blew down in a gale on 5 December 1906 and was never rebuilt.

Cadets from the Air Training Corps recreated this historic trans-atlantic transmission in Easter of 2006. Edinburgh and South Scotland Wing, who were on camp at the nearby airfield, contacted the Civil Air Patrol cadets in Brant Rock on 14 April 2006.

The views and skies seen from the beach and Lossit Point to the west were a subject for the Scottish marine and landscape painter William McTaggart, who had a house in the village.

== See also ==
- Lossit House
