= Plynlimon and Hafan Tramway =

Former narrow gauge railway in Wales

Coordinates: 52.744°N 3.360°W

Overview
- Headquarters: Talybont
- Locale: Wales
- Dates of operation: 1897–1899
- Successor: abandoned

Technical
- Track gauge: 2 ft 3 in (686 mm)
- Length: 7 3/4 miles (12.47 km)

The Plynlimon and Hafan Tramway was a 2 ft 3 in (686 mm) gauge narrow gauge railway in Cardiganshire (now Ceredigion) in Mid Wales. It ran from Llanfihangel station (later renamed Llandre station) on the Cambrian Line, through the village of Tal-y-bont and the valley of the Afon Leri, into the foothills of Plynlimon Fawr. It was built to serve the lead mines at Bwlch Glas and stone quarries around Hafan and opened in 1897, closing just two years later. The line was a little over 7 miles (11 km) long and, despite running a short-lived passenger service, it served no communities of more than 100 people.

== History ==
=== Background: before 1895 ===
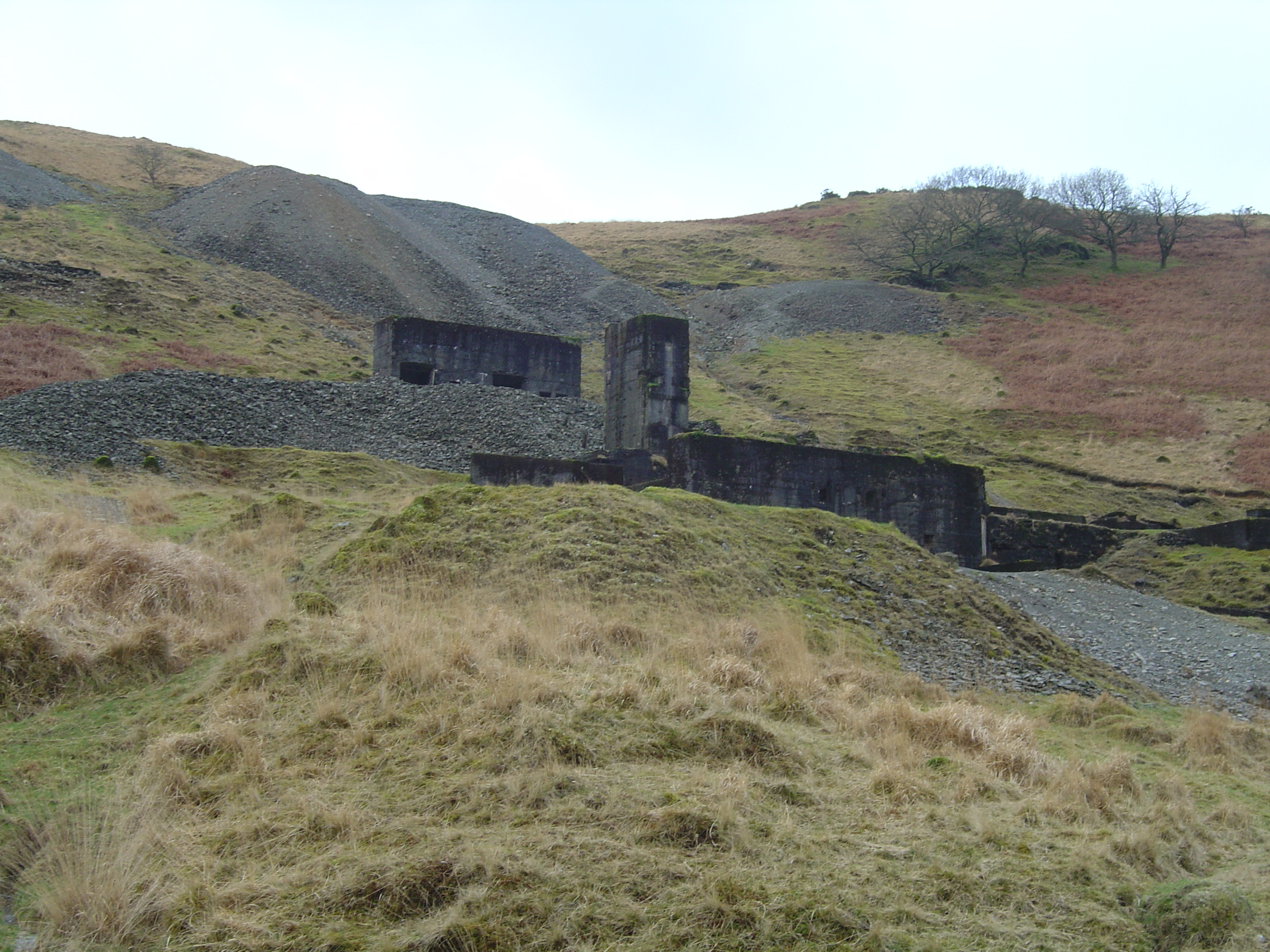
Bwlch-glâs mine was one of the reasons for the existence of the tramway.

Mining of minerals in the hills east of Tal-y-bont dates back as far as 1698, with the Hafan Mine, which principally produced lead, but also copper and zinc ores.

In 1890, Captain John Davis of Tal-y-bont and Thomas Molyneux, an industrialist of Earlestown in Lancashire, joined forces to exploit minerals from local mines including Hafan Mine, and to develop grit stone quarries on Hafan mountain. Molyneux proposed building a tramway from Hafan to the coast at Ynyslas along the Leri Valley from Hafan through Talybont to Dolybont, and then running down and across Cors Fochno using the canalised embankment of the Leri diversion constructed by the Aberystwith and Welsh Coast Railway, to a Dock suitable for coasters at Ynyslas. However the Cambrian Railways would not permit the tramway to cross its line at any point between Machynlleth and Aberystwyth, leaving no alternative but to unload into barges to get under the bridge at Ynyslas, and then tranship to coasters on the other side.

Much thinking went on as to how to get to the sea elsewhere: in frustration, Clarach Bay was considered but ship loading would have been very difficult. A tramway under Ynyslas bridge was considered but discounted due to obvious tide problems, even a line alongside the main line to Aberystwyth Harbour was considered. Transhipping at Ynyslas was discounted as too costly a procedure. In the end it was decided the only option was to go to the Cambrian Railways' Llanfihangel station, even though Mr Molyneaux had previously stated that much benefit would be lost by their not having direct access to a port.

=== Construction: 1896 to May 1897 ===
Construction commenced on 11 January 1896, but was briefly brought to a halt by the Gogerddan Estate as agreements for the final route had not been signed. Some months afterward construction resumed. The mines and tramway to this point had been funded by Molyneaux, but on 24 October 1896 he sold his holdings to the Plynlimon & Hafan Co. Ltd. for £14,000 of the new company's ordinary shares – meaning he held 46.6% of the new company, and became its Managing Director – with his son holding the post of General Manager and Engineer (having been involved for some while).

By late 1896, the trackbed of the line was largely complete. After much delay, track materials were delivered in January 1897, with the first rails being laid at Tal-y-bont on 11 January by contractor Mr. Price of Newtown. Tracklaying progressed quickly and in May the first locomotive Victoria arrived on site. During December, Molyneaux had asked Sir P. P. Pryse "...to try to get Sir James Szlumper to adopt the P&H gauge of 27in for the proposed Devils Bridge line". Szlumper decided to build the Vale of Rheidol Railway to a gauge of 1 ft 11 3/4 in (603 mm) due to the sharp curves required for the line.

=== Testing and opening: June 1897 to August 1897 ===
The first test run of Victoria was a limited success. On 5 June, another attempt was made with the locomotive propelling two trollies and pulling a third. Just before Glanfred Lane level crossing a piece of timber was spotted lying across the rails. One of the men on the leading trolley, Richard Owen Roberts, tried to kick the timber away while the train was in motion, but he slipped and fell underneath the train and was killed when the locomotive ran over him. Three other men on the trollies were severely injured in the accident. The railway had suffered a spate of stones and timbers being laid across the tracks, though this was by far the most serious outcome of this vandalism.

In August 1897, the second locomotive Talybont arrived along with the line's first passenger carriage. On 19 August a trial train was run as far as the bottom of the Hafan incline, although the track between Llanfihangel and Tal-y-bont was not laid to a high enough quality to permit passenger services to begin immediately.

=== Services and closure: September 1897 to 1899 ===
From late 1897, freight service began on the line. The formal opening to passengers took place on 28 March 1898, although trains only ran on Mondays, connecting with the Cambrian Railway's Market Day Special to Aberystwyth. The majority of passenger trains in the line's short history stopped at Tal-y-bont as there were few houses to be served further east of that village.

The passenger service only ran until the summer of 1899 and the entire company went into voluntary liquidation on 19 December 1899 the last train having run sometime before that date.

=== Re-opening attempts: 1900 and later ===
Not long after closure, the company operating the Bryn-yr-Afr Mine attempted to reopen the line to serve their needs, but nothing came of it.

In 1910, Cardiganshire County Council suggested to the company that they explore re-opening the tramway as a standard gauge branch of the Cambrian Railways. However, this also came to nothing. The track remained in place until 1914 when it was taken up, though the stretch of line through the Bwlchglas Farm property remained intact until scrapped by the landlord in 1926.

== Route ==
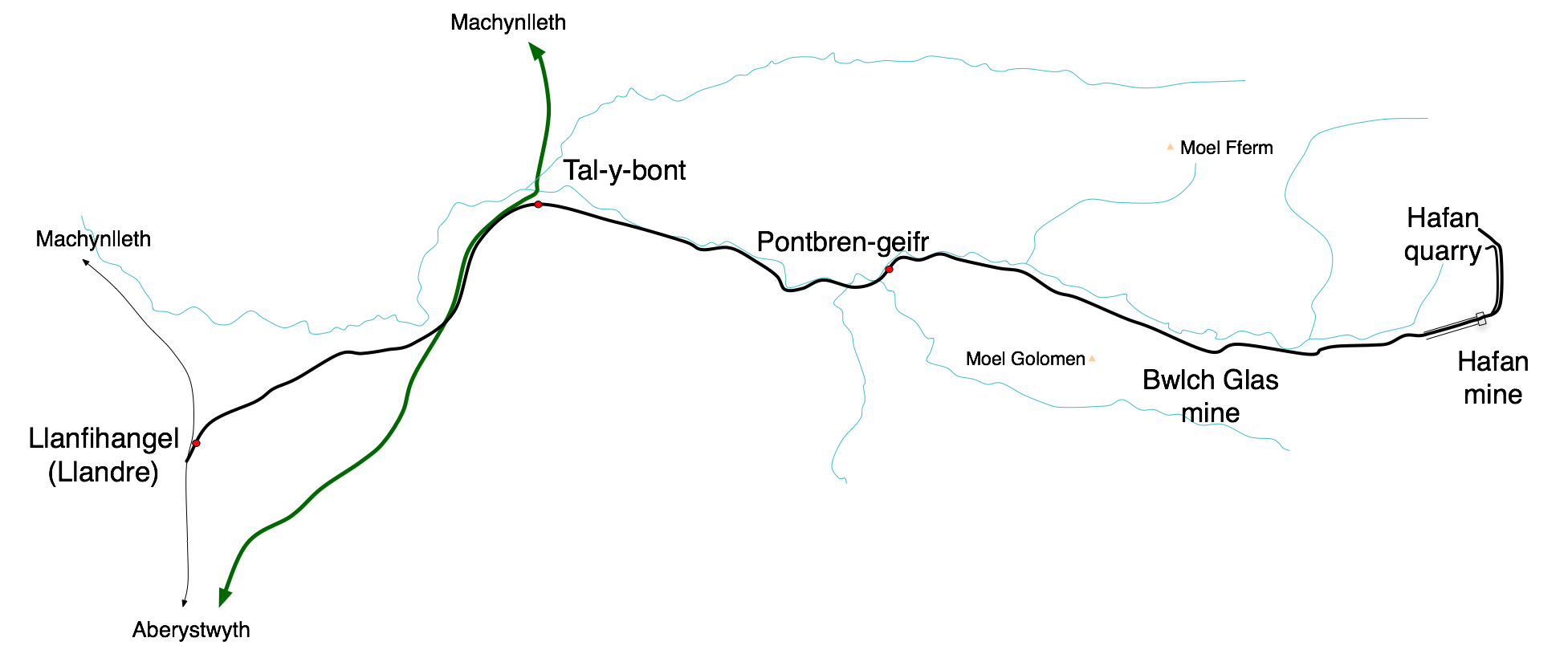
Route of the tramway

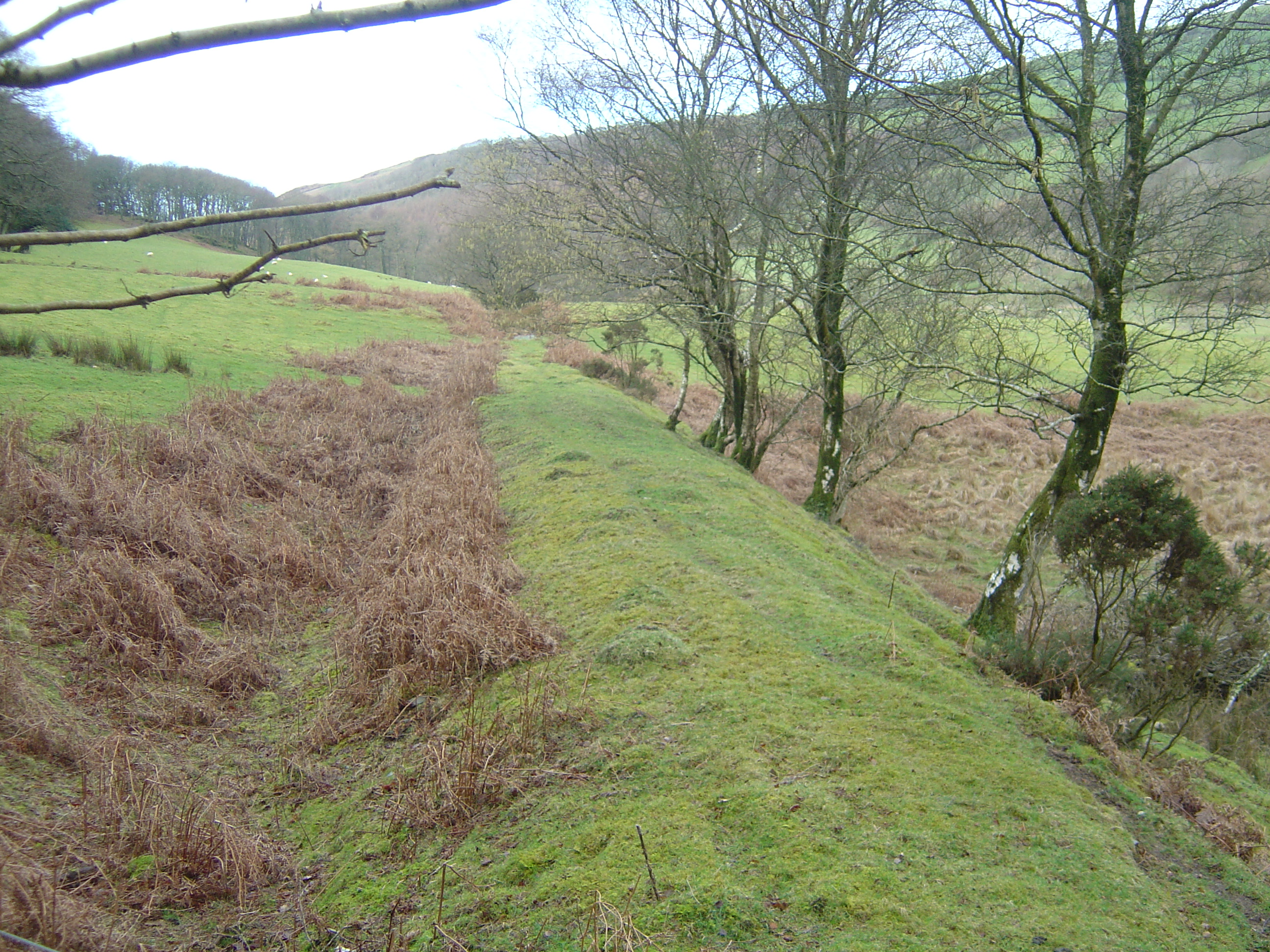
In some places, the trackbed is clearly visible, even a century after closure. This photo was taken above Pontbren-geifr.

The main line (which was marked by steep gradients) terminated at the foot of the Hafan Incline, while a mineral extension led from the top of the incline to a granite sett quarry operated by the Bagnall locomotive Hafan.

Molyneaux had proposed a tunnel under Hafan so to serve the Bryn-yr-Afr Mine, but this was only a dual step in the 'grand plan' for a connection south to the Devils Bridge line and the other northerly connections that were on Mr Molyneaux's mind.

=== Passenger stations ===
During the railway's brief operation of a passenger service, there were two stations served by the line; these were:

- Llanfihangel, the interchange station with the Cambrian Coast Line serving the village of Llandre (Welsh name Llanfihangel Genau'r Glyn). The Cambrian station both pre-dated it and out-lived it, opening on 23 June 1864 and closing on 14 June 1965. The station was renamed to Llandre in 1916, after the Plynlimon and Hafan Tramway closed.
- Pen-Rhiw or Tal-y-bont, serving the village of Tal-y-bont. This was situated to the south of the village, on the hillside. There was a passing loop in the station, and the railway's engine shed was situated at east end of the station. This was the railway's primary station.

Although regular passenger trains terminated at Tal-y-bont, occasional services ran further east for approximately 5 miles (8 km) to the foot of the incline.

== Remains ==
Today the trackbed formation from Pontbrengeifr to the Hafan incline remains largely open and intact and can be walked; much of the formation of the mineral extensions at the top of the incline is also traceable. Between Pontbrengeifr and Tal-y-bont sections of the trackbed remain intact, but others have been eroded away by the Afon Leri and are heavily overgrown which makes walking it more difficult. There is now little to see of the former exchange sidings at Llandre, this is a playground adjacent to the former standard gauge station.

Starting at the former Llanfihangel/Llandre station, the route between the Llandre station and today's A487 road has been obliterated by road widening in Llandre village on the B4353 road, and with houses and gardens along Glan-Fred Lane before reaching the A487 road. Road widening (in the late 1970s) of the A487 buried another section of trackbed, but a short distance still exists prior to Tal-y-bont on the east side of the road, now used as a short segregated cycle path between two hedges.

Traveling further to the north alongside the A487 before turning eastward, Tal-y-bont station and engine shed has been buried by several houses. The trackbed turns east and re-appears as a prominent shallow embankment alongside a narrow road. This narrow road eventually merges with the trackbed before disappearing into a field. Then trackbed crossed some fields before crossing the Afon Leri near the road junction with the unclassified road to the Cyneiniog valley. The trackbed closely follows this road between Pontbren-geifr on a prominent trackbed on the north side of the road to a level crossing of the road to Ty Nant farm.

The trackbed then moves to the south side of the road into a wooded section and can easily be followed for some distance before it rejoins the road at a white cottage. It then moves to the north of the road and adjacent to a sharp bend in the road is a deep cutting. Beyond this, the trackbed again moves to the south side of the road and can be easily followed to the remains of Bwlch Glas mine. Part of the mine structures were built over the remains of the trackbed as the mine was expanded and operated after the tramway closed.

Beyond the mine, the trackbed rises on an embankment with a missing under bridge. It gradually climbs eastward on the south side of the Cyneiniog valley before reaching the foot of the Hafan incline. This section had the remains of wooden sleepers that could be seen in the 1990s.

None of the passenger stations or any buildings or structures have survived to the present day.

== Choice of gauge ==
The Plynlimon and Hafan was one of the most obscure common carrier railways in Britain. It shared its unusual gauge with only three other public railways in Britain: the nearby Corris Railway and Talyllyn Railway and the Campbeltown and Machrihanish Light Railway in Scotland.

Molyneaux's had long-term ambitions to connect the Plymlimon and Hafan to the Corris Railway, and he also unsuccessfully pressed the promoters of the Vale of Rheidol Railway to adopt the same gauge, which if adopted would have created a 2 ft 3 in (686 mm) system in the area to rival the 2 ft (610 mm) gauge lines around Porthmadog. Since the Corris Railway had originally had access under the Cambrian line at Machynlleth for its horse-worked extension to Morben, it might have been possible to revive this section of line as a linking route, but it was another step again to link to the Talyllyn. However, the P&H's loading gauge was both taller and wider than its two northern neighbours, and so none of its rolling stock could have been used on either Corris or Talyllyn, suggesting that no link was seriously contemplated. This also meant that neither line were interested in buying any of the P&H rolling stock after it closed.

== Locomotives ==
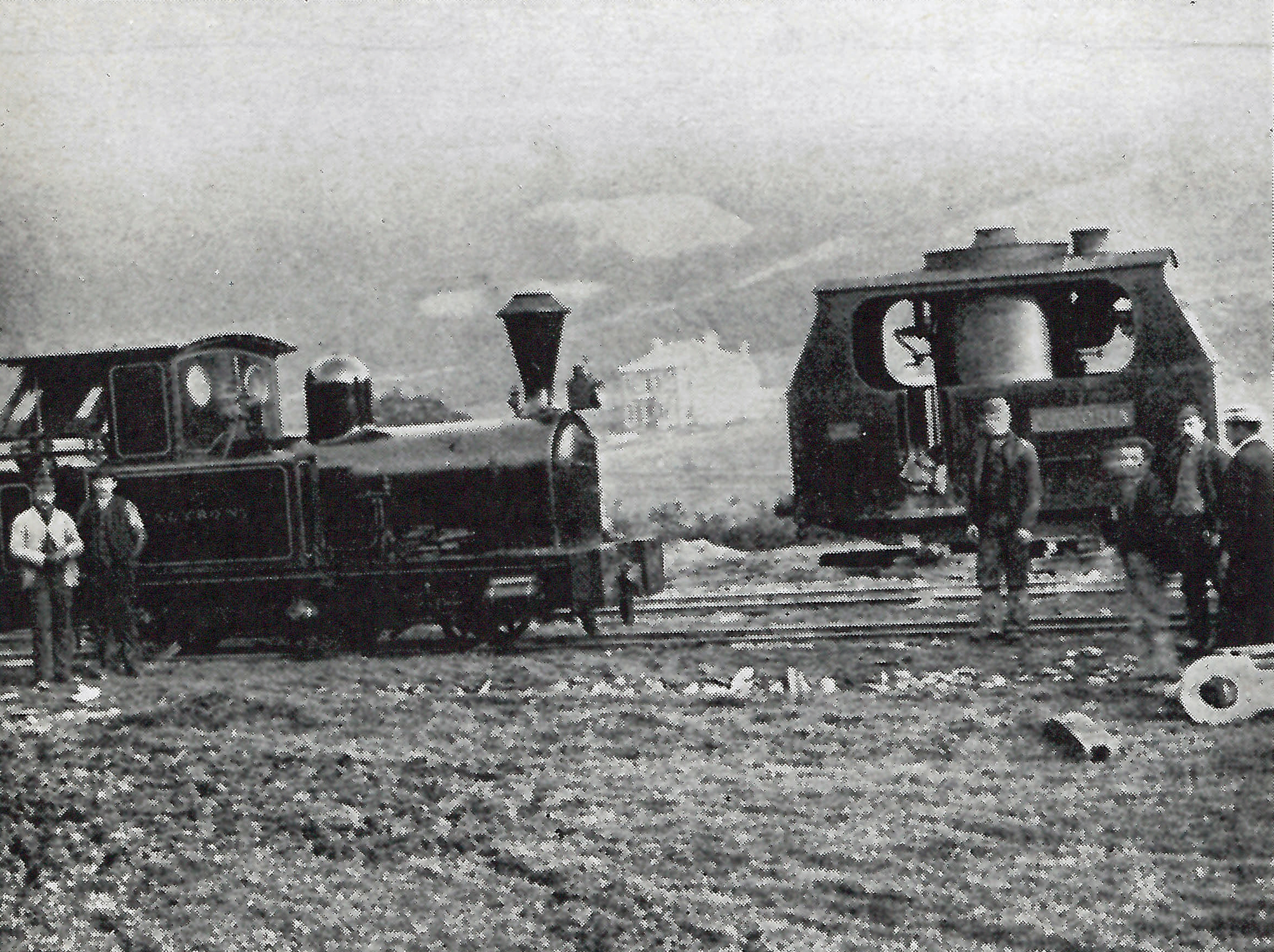
Talybont (left) and Victoria pictured at Tal-y-bont station

The tramway owned three steam locomotives; these were:

- Victoria, an 0-4-0VB of highly unusual design, with a vertical boiler and tram-like bodywork. The locomotive was built by Messrs John Slee & Co of Earlestown; it was the only locomotive that company made. The locomotive originally had four cylinders, later reduced to two as the boiler could not supply enough steam for four. Victoria was delivered to Llanfihangel on 12 May 1897. The locomotive performed poorly and is not known to have run in revenue-earning service. Its intended main line duties were taken over by Talybont.
- Talybont, a 2-4-0T of a conventional design built by W. G. Bagnall, carrying the works number 1497. The locomotive was originally intended for a customer in Brazil, who cancelled the order. Talybont worked the main line from Llanfihangel via Tal-y-bont to the foot of the Hafan incline. The locomotive was repurchased by Bagnall after the line closed, who regauged it for sale to the 1 ft 11 3/4 in (603 mm)-gauge Vale of Rheidol Railway, where the locomotive became their No.3 Rheidol. It continued to work on that railway until 1924, when it was scrapped.
- Hafan, an 0-4-0ST also built by Bagnall, carrying the works number 1510. Hafan ran on the quarry section above the Hafan incline. The locomotive was repurchased by Bagnall in 1901 and subsequently worked on the Halifax Corporation's Walshaw Dean Reservoirs construction contract for which she was regauged to 3 ft (914 mm). After several further reservoir construction contracts it was last noted working at the Bedley Timber Company at Nairn, Scotland in 1920.

== Passenger Carriage ==
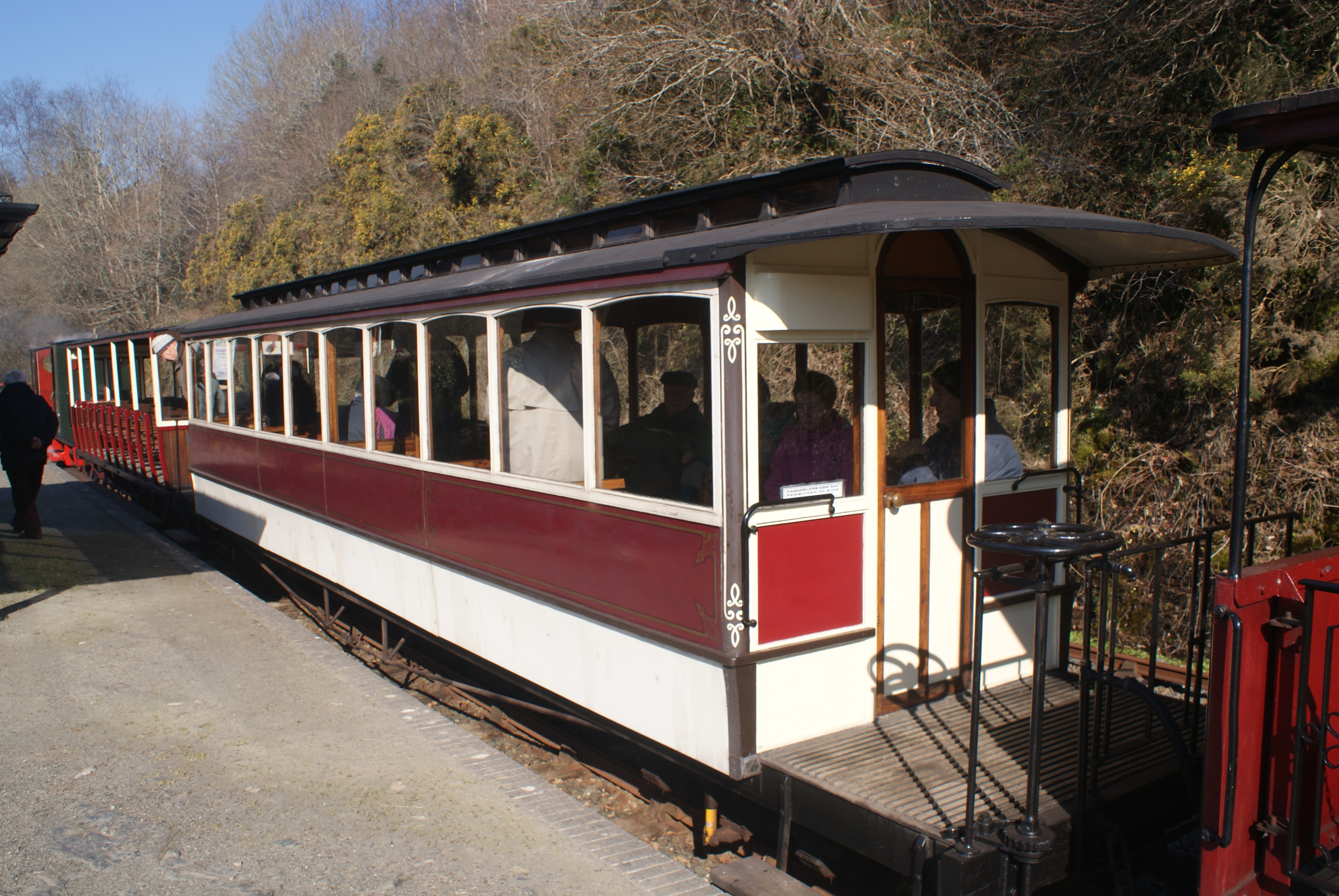
Replica carriage on the Launceston Steam Railway

The tramway had only one passenger carriage, a rather ornate vehicle with end balconies and clerestory roof. After the tramway closed the coach was transported to Llanbadarn Fawr near Aberystwyth for use as a summer house, but decayed many years ago. A replica has been built and is running on the Launceston Steam Railway in Cornwall.

== Goods Vehicles ==
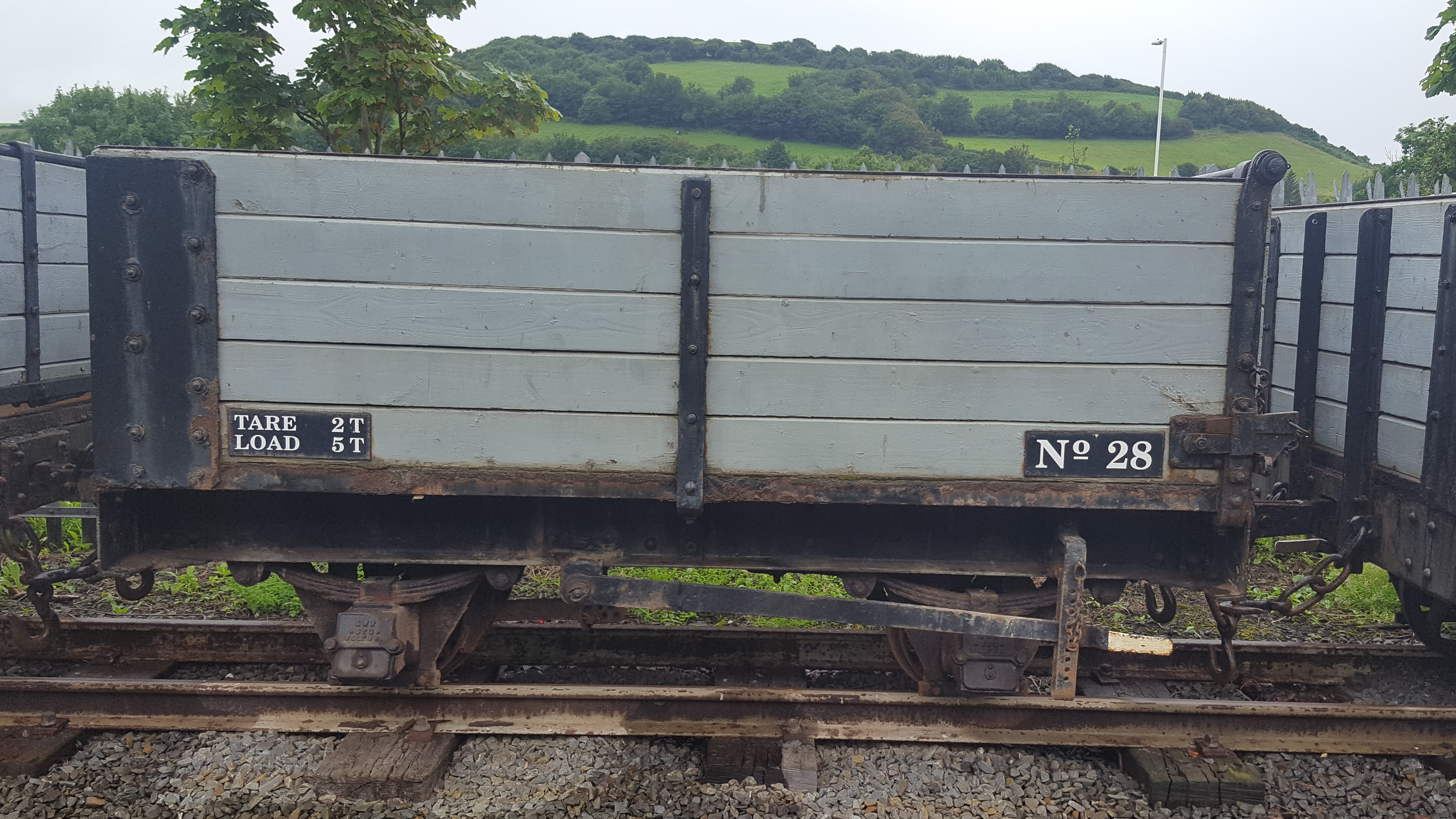
A former Plynlimon and Hafan Tramway wagon, now rebuilt as Vale of Rheidol wagon No. 28.

Some of the tramway's wagons accompanied Talybont to the Vale of Rheidol, and, much rebuilt, remain there to this day.

== See also ==
- List of 2 ft 3 in gauge railways
- British narrow-gauge railways

== Bibliography ==
- Cozens, Lewis (1955). The Plynlimon & Hafan Tramway.
- Boyd, J.I.C. (1986). Narrow Gauge Railways in Mid Wales. The Oakwood Press.
- Wade, E.A. (1997). The Plynlimon & Hafan Tramway (2 ed.). Twelveheads Press. ISBN 9780906294383.
