= Cliff Thomas =

Cliff Thomas may refer to:

- Cliff Thomas (writer)
- Cliff Thomas (kickboxer)
