= Talyllyn Railway =

Narrow-gauge railway in north Wales

Talyllyn Railway Rheilffordd Talyllyn
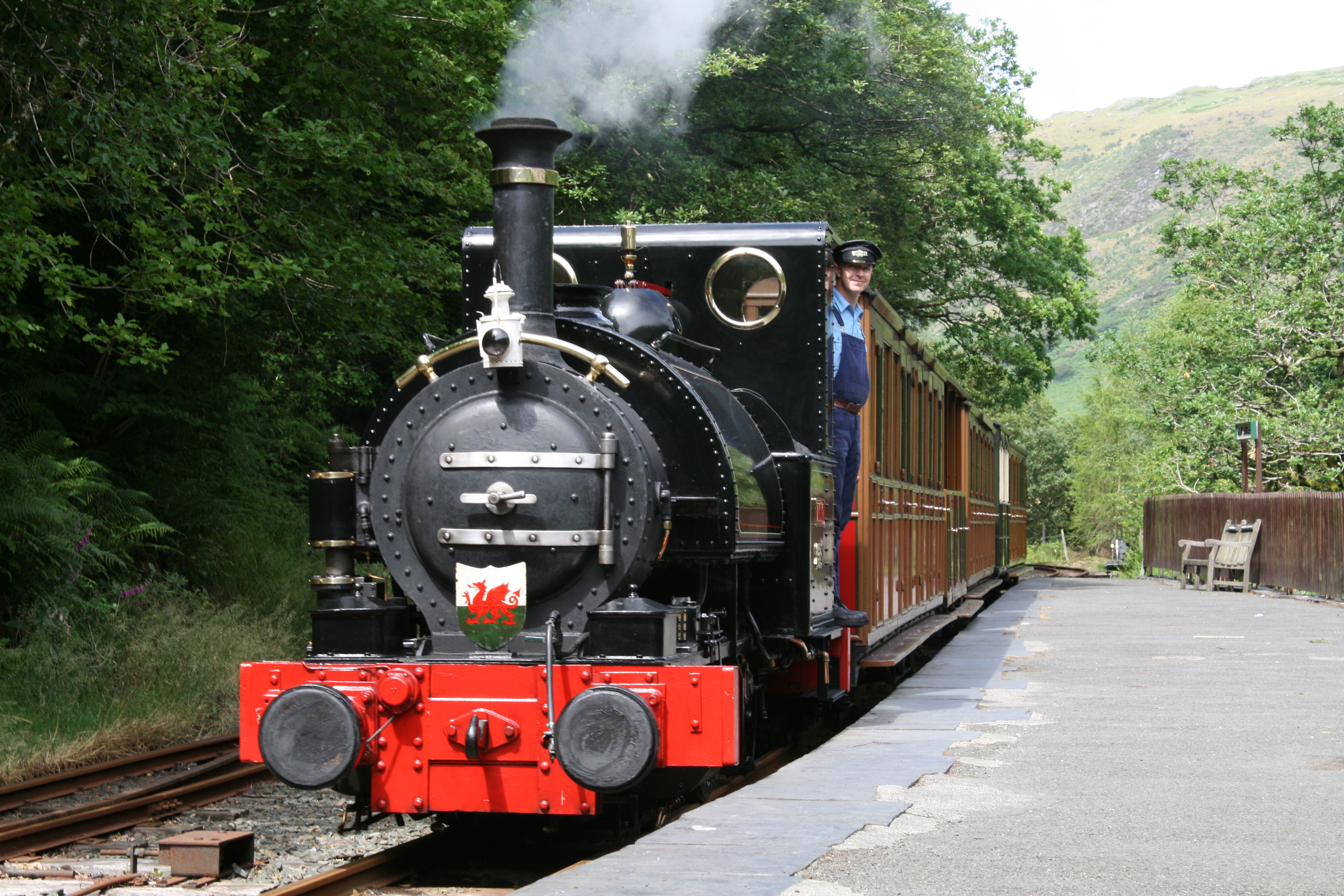
- Locomotive No. 1 Talyllyn arrives at Nant Gwernol terminus.
- Locale: Wales
- Terminus: Tywyn Wharf
- Coordinates: 52.5837°N 4.0887°W
- Map showing location of Talyllyn Railway

Commercial operations
- Name: Talyllyn Railway
- Original gauge: 2 ft 3 in (686 mm)

Preserved operations
- Operated by: Talyllyn Railway Company, supported by Talyllyn Railway Preservation Society
- Stations: 7 and 5 halts
- Length: 7.25 miles (11.67 km)
- Preserved gauge: 2 ft 3 in (686 mm)
- 1865: Royal Assent achieved
- 1866: Opened for passenger services
- 1911: Sold to Henry Haydn Jones
- 1946: Quarry closed

Preservation history
- 1951: Taken over by the Preservation Society
- 1976: Opening of extension to Nant Gwernol
- 2005: New station building and museum opened at Tywyn
- 2021: Railway designated part of a World Heritage Site
- 2026: Railway celebrated 75 years of preservation

UNESCO World Heritage Site
- Part of: The Slate Landscape of Northwest Wales
- Criteria: Cultural: ii, iv
- Reference: 1633-006
- Inscription: 2021 (44th Session)

The Talyllyn Railway (Welsh: Rheilffordd Talyllyn) is a narrow-gauge railway in Wales, which runs for 7 1/4 miles (12 km) from Tywyn (Note: The spelling of local place names has changed during the history of the railway; for example Tywyn was generally spelled as "Towyn" until 1975. Modern place name spellings are used throughout this article.) on the Mid-Wales coast to Nant Gwernol near the village of Abergynolwyn. Opened in 1865 to carry slate from the quarries at Bryn Eglwys to Tywyn, it was the first narrow-gauge railway in Britain authorised by Act of Parliament to carry passengers using steam haulage. Despite severe underinvestment, the line remained open, and in 1951 it became the first railway in the world to be preserved as a heritage railway by volunteers.

Since preservation, the railway has operated as a tourist attraction, expanding its rolling stock through acquisition and an engineering programme to build new locomotives and carriages. In 1976, an extension was opened along the former mineral line from Abergynolwyn to the new station at Nant Gwernol. A major rebuilding and extension of Tywyn Wharf station took place in 2005, including a much-expanded facility for the Narrow Gauge Railway Museum, and in 2021 the railway was designated a World Heritage Site as part of the Slate Landscape of Northwest Wales.

The fictional Skarloey Railway, which formed part of The Railway Series of children's books by the Rev. W. Awdry, was based on the Talyllyn Railway. The preservation of the line inspired the Ealing Comedy film The Titfield Thunderbolt.

== Name ==
The origin of the railway's name is uncertain: it may refer to the parish of Tal-y-llyn, which contains its eastern terminus, or it may come from Tal-y-llyn, (Note: According to the Ordnance Survey, the name of the lake is hyphenated. In the early days of the preservation society, it was decided that the name of the railway would be unhyphenated. This convention has been applied to the railway ever since, and is used throughout this article.) a large glacial ribbon lake at the foot of Cadair Idris 3 miles (4.8 km) further east.

== Gauge ==
The 2 ft 3 in (686 mm) gauge of the track is unusual, and was shared by only three other public railways in the United Kingdom: the Corris Railway and the Plynlimon and Hafan Tramway both a few miles from the Talyllyn, and the Campbeltown and Machrihanish Light Railway in Scotland. Only the Corris Railway is still in operation.

== History ==
=== Commercial history ===
==== Origins and construction: up to 1866 ====
Slate quarrying began in the hills above Tywyn in the 1830s, but although many small quarries and test levels were established, only one major quarry was developed in the region, the Bryn Eglwys quarry, 7 miles (11 km) north-east of the town. Underground working began in the early 1840s, and by 1847 the quarry was being worked by local landowner John Pughe. The finished slates were sent by packhorse to the wharf at Pennal, transferred to boats for a river trip to Aberdyfi (also spelled as Aberdovey), and then finally loaded into seagoing vessels, a complex and expensive transportation arrangement which limited the quarry's output. In 1861 the outbreak of the American Civil War cut off supplies of cotton to the mills of the north west of England and as a result a number of prosperous mill owners looked for new business opportunities to diversify their interests. One such owner was William McConnel of Lancashire who, in 1859, had purchased Hengwrt Hall near Dolgellau, north of Tywyn. In January 1864, McConnel formed the Aberdovey Slate Company, which leased the land including Bryn Eglwys from the landowner, Lewis Morris of Machynlleth.

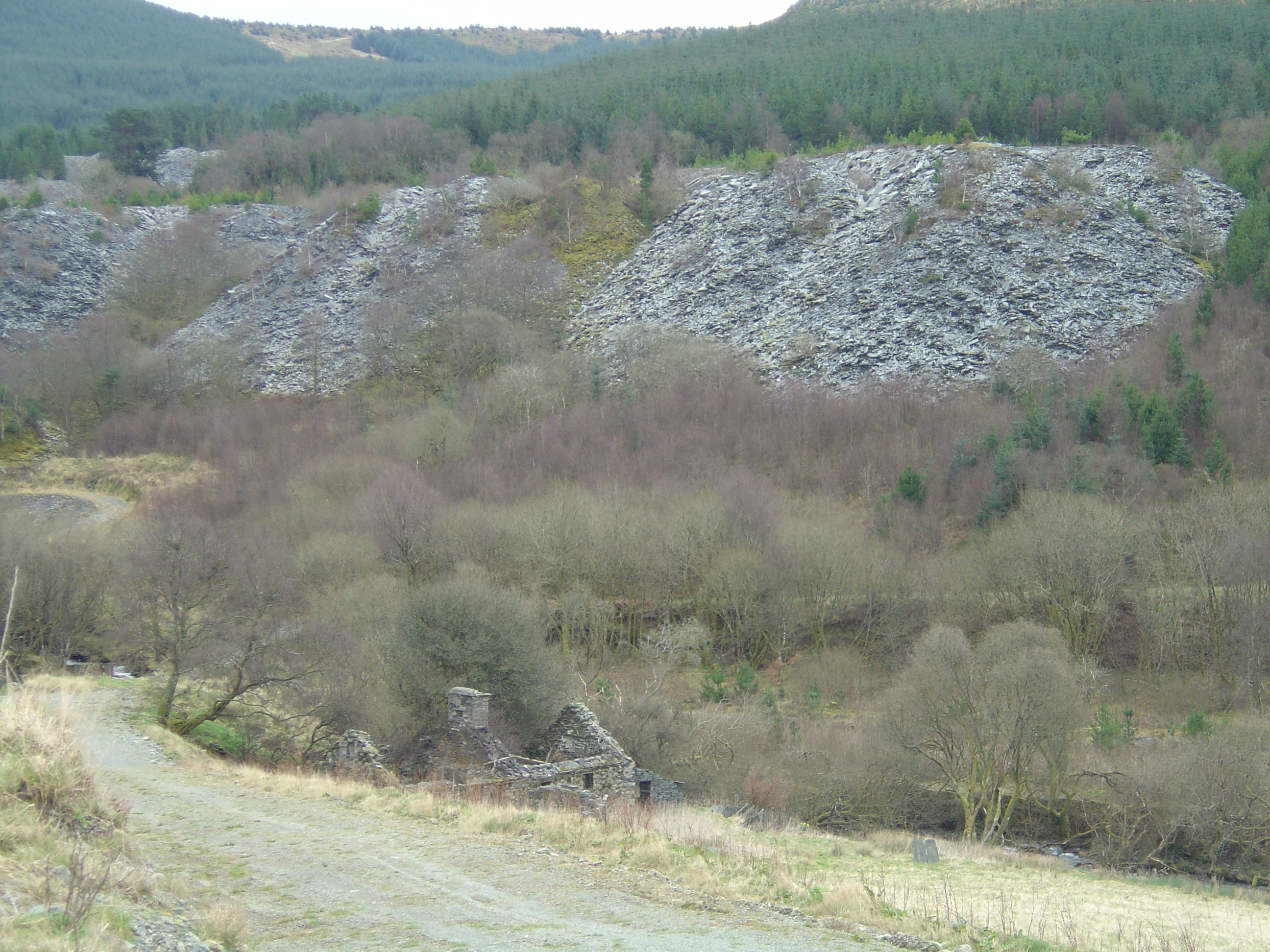
The remains of Bryn Eglwys quarry in 2008

McConnel set about improving Bryn Eglwys to increase its output. He focused on providing rail transport for the isolated quarry, and in April 1864 he reached an agreement with local landowners to purchase the land necessary to build a railway towards Tywyn and onwards to the port of Aberdyfi. Construction was well underway by July 1864. The standard gauge Aberystwith and Welsh Coast Railway was expanding rapidly from its base at Machynlleth, however, and in 1863 had reached Tywyn, so McConnel decided to build his line from the quarry to Tywyn, as the nearest point where slate could be transferred to the standard gauge railway. This was despite the line's initial isolation from the rest of the system because of difficulties in bridging the estuary of the Afon Dyfi to the south. An act of Parliament, the Talyllyn Railway Act 1865 (28 & 29 Vict. c. cccxv) allowing the company to operate passenger trains as a public railway, was given royal assent on 5 July 1865, and the company appointed James Swinton Spooner as engineer for the construction. He laid out plans for a relatively straight line climbing steadily from Tywyn to the quarry and work quickly got underway. By September 1866 construction had advanced to the point where the Board of Trade inspector Captain Henry Tyler could make an initial inspection and report.

Tyler's report led to an unusual alteration, as it was discovered that the internal width of the overbridges was only 9 ft 1 in (277 cm), but the railway's passenger carriages were 5 ft 3.5 in (161.3 cm) wide, leaving only 1 ft 10 3/4 in (57.8 cm) clearance on either side, which was 7 3/4 in (19.7 cm) less than the minimum required clearance of 2 ft 6 in (76 cm). To alleviate this problem, McConnel proposed that the doors on one side of each carriage be permanently barred and the track slewed off-centre beneath the bridges to allow adequate clearance at least on the side with doors, which would allow passengers to get out of the carriages if the train stopped underneath a bridge. Tyler agreed to this arrangement, and to this day all carriages on the Talyllyn have doors on one side only, an unusual feature for a public railway which is shared (albeit for different reasons) with the neighbouring Corris Railway. Tyler also required improvements to be made to the railway's first two steam locomotives, as locomotive No. 1 suffered from excessive "vertical motion" and No. 2 was said to suffer from "horizontal oscillation". No. 1 was returned to its manufacturer where a set of trailing wheels was added to reduce the rear overhang, and the springs on No. 2 were adjusted and the crank pins shortened to reduce its oscillation.

Tyler did not approve the opening until his listed improvements were completed, although slate trains and unofficial passenger trains were running in 1865. During November of 1866, Tyler returned to Tywyn and re-inspected the railway following which, subject to some further minor improvements, he approved its formal opening for passenger service. The first public passenger timetable was issued in December 1866, and the first purpose-built, steam-worked, narrow gauge public railway in Britain opened for service.

==== Prosperity under McConnel: 1866–1880s ====
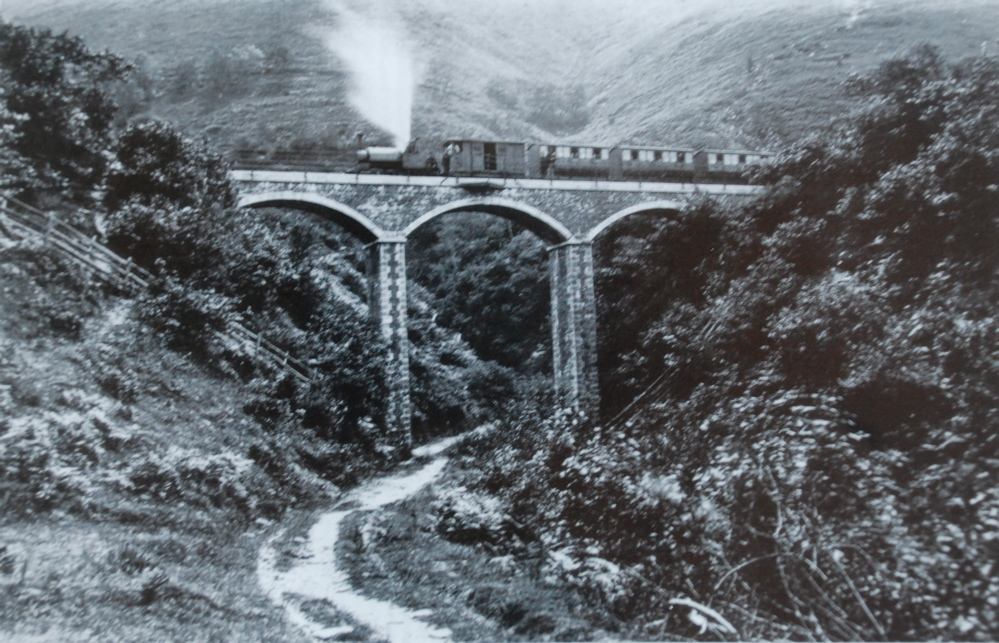
Talyllyn posed on Dolgoch Viaduct around 1867, the earliest known photograph of the Talyllyn

The railway opened with two locomotives, one carriage and several goods vehicles in use and was operated under a "one engine in steam" policy to ensure that two trains could not collide. Initially the working locomotive was housed in a wooden shed at Ty Dwr on the mineral line above Abergynolwyn station, while the main engineering works at Pendre were constructed. The Pendre works opened on 17 February 1867 and from then on trains began working from Pendre instead of Abergynolwyn.

At the time of the line's opening, stations were provided at Pendre and Abergynolwyn. In 1867, the halt at Rhydyronen opened, followed by Dolgoch later that year and Brynglas in 1872. Some time shortly after the opening of the railway, a branch to Abergynolwyn village was provided. A steep incline dropped from the mineral line east of Abergynolwyn station to the village below, where a series of tram lines radiated. Coal, building materials and general goods were delivered down the incline, and the contents of the village cesspits were hauled back up for disposal along the lineside.

The railway used steam locomotives from the start, unlike its neighbour the horse-drawn Corris Railway. The original two locomotives, although of entirely different design, were both purchased from Fletcher, Jennings & Co. of Whitehaven in Cumbria, and both are still in service, 150 years on, although so many of their parts have been replaced down the years that much of their present-day component metal is not original. The Talyllyn's rare gauge is thought to have been adopted to match that of the Corris Railway, and the line's two original steam locomotives were among the earliest locomotives built for such a narrow gauge. No. 1 Talyllyn is an 0-4-2ST and No. 2 Dolgoch is an 0-4-0WT. The line carried slate from the quarry to the wharf at Tywyn and general goods along its length. Public passenger trains initially ran between Abergynolwyn, Dolgoch and Pendre stations only; quarrymen were carried on unofficial trains that continued on from Abergynolwyn to the foot of the Alltwyllt incline in Nant Gwernol gorge.

The line operated successfully during its early years, serving the quarry and the local district. By 1880, Bryn Eglwys employed 300 workers and was producing 8,000 long tons (8,100 t) of finished slate per year, all shipped via the railway. Passenger traffic was substantial, rising from 11,500 passengers carried in 1867 to over 23,000 (roughly equivalent to 40,000 passenger journeys) in 1877.

==== Declining fortunes: 1880s–1910 ====
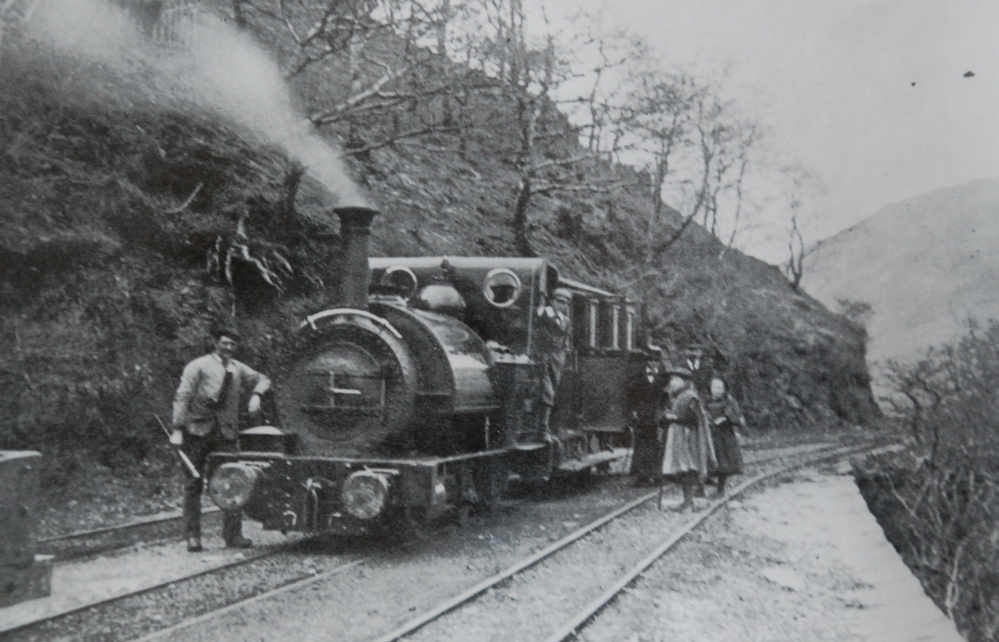
Talyllyn at the foot of the Alltwyllt incline, the present site of Nant Gwernol station, 1890

In 1879, McConnel bought out the other shareholders of the Aberdovey Slate Company, and became the sole owner of the railway, the quarry and much of Abergynolwyn village.

From the 1880s onwards the "Grand Tour" was a popular option with tourists. This used charabancs to link the Talyllyn and Corris railways via Tal-y-llyn Lake and Cadair Idris, returning on Cambrian Railways trains. The last two decades of the 19th century saw a decline in the demand for slate, and many smaller quarries fell on hard times, including Bryn Eglwys, where by 1890 production had halved to 4,000 long tons (4,100 t) a year. In 1896, production at the Penrhyn Quarry in north Wales, one of the largest producers of slate, was stopped due to labour disputes, resulting in a temporary increase in demand at other quarries. McConnel expanded production at Bryn Eglwys to take advantage of the sudden demand, but only with the aim of maximising profits during the remainder of his lease, which was to expire in 1910. He built new trial levels without proper provision for the removal of overburden and pushed the limits of safe working in the existing chambers. As McConnel's lease drew to its close, there was no prospect of a further lessee coming forward and work began on dismantling the quarry's equipment.

==== Haydn Jones era: 1911–1950 ====
The Bryn Eglwys quarry was the primary employer in the Abergynolwyn district, so its closure caused significant distress. In 1910, local landowner Henry Haydn Jones was elected the Member of Parliament (MP) for Merioneth. He understood the importance of Bryn Eglwys, and at the end of the year he purchased the quarry company for just over £5000. The quarry re-opened in January 1911, though Haydn Jones did not have capital to invest in the quarry. The first workings reopened were on the Broad Vein, which yielded relatively hard slate that was less popular and therefore difficult to sell. The lack of an available market for this output forced the quarry to switch to extracting softer slate from the Narrow Vein but, because Haydn Jones could not afford to open new workings into the Narrow Vein, he resorted to the dangerous practice of narrowing the columns that supported the roofs of the underground chambers. This practice had begun under McConnel's ownership and Haydn Jones continued it throughout his ownership of the quarry. A brief construction boom after the First World War saw production return to around 4,000 long tons (4,100 t) per year.

The 1920s also saw an upsurge in holiday traffic, as Britain recovered from the war and tourism gained in popularity. The Talyllyn saw summer passenger numbers grow significantly and regularly had to supplement its formal passenger stock with slate wagons fitted with planks as seats. An unusual tourist service offered by the railway was to hire a slate wagon, which would be left at Abergynolwyn. At the end of the day the tourists would return to Tywyn in the wagon, powered by gravity. This service was discontinued in the early 1930s. The additional income from the tourist trade defrayed some of the costs of operating the railway, but never enough for it to make a profit during Haydn Jones' ownership.

The lease on Bryn Eglwys expired in 1942, but was extended on an annual basis. The October 1942 Bradshaw's Guide shows two return passenger trains operating only on Monday, Wednesday and Fridays, taking 45 minutes in each direction. No passenger service was provided on other days. Overnight on 26 December 1946, several weakened support columns in the quarry gave way, resulting in a significant collapse; the quarry was deemed unsafe and closed immediately. Haydn Jones had promised to continue operating the railway as long as he was alive and so, despite the closure of the quarry, the railway continued to run trains on a shoestring budget. In 1947 the British railway system was nationalised and the Talyllyn was one of the few operating railways not included. The reasons for this are unclear, but it is significant that all official mention of the railway had ceased several decades before and it is likely that the line was simply forgotten by officialdom. Between 1947 and 1949 the railway ran a passenger service two days a week. In 1949 Haydn Jones, who leased the Aberllefenni Slate Quarry, purchased 10 tons of rail from the recently lifted Corris Railway. On 2 July 1950 Haydn Jones died and closure of the railway seemed inevitable, but the line continued to operate for the remainder of the summer season, ending on 6 October.

=== Preservation ===
==== Rescue: 1951–1960 ====
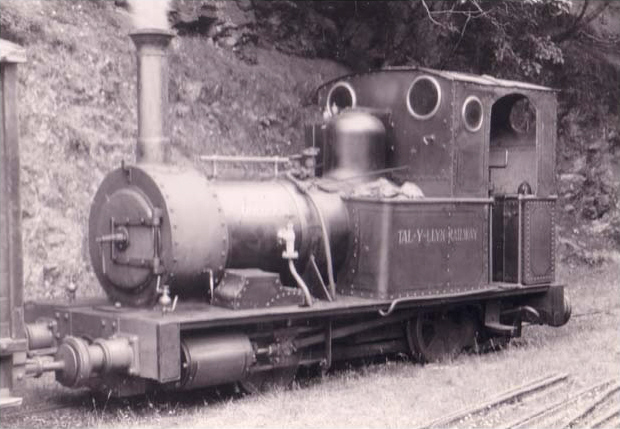
Locomotive No. 2 Dolgoch at Abergynolwyn in 1951, early in the preservation era

The author and biographer Tom Rolt visited the line in 1949, along with the locomotive engineer David Curwen. In the summer of 1950, Rolt wrote a letter to the Birmingham Post suggesting that a rescue of the Talyllyn be undertaken. He received sufficient positive response for a meeting of interested enthusiasts to be held on 11 October 1950 at the Imperial Hotel in Birmingham. Around 70 people, including Patrick Whitehouse, attended the meeting, with Rolt proposing the formation of a committee to look into the acquisition of the railway. With the support of the meeting, the committee – with Rolt as chairman and Whitehouse as secretary – met for the first time on 23 October and immediately entered into negotiation with Haydn Jones' executors.

The transfer of ownership to the committee was legally complex, but both parties agreed that all shares in the railway company would be transferred from Haydn Jones' estate to a new company called Talyllyn Holdings Ltd., whose board consisted of two directors from the executors and two from the committee. The transfer took place on 8 February 1951, at which point the newly formed Talyllyn Railway Preservation Society effectively took control of the railway. The Society immediately began to publicise its efforts, hoping to raise funds and find further volunteers to help reopen the railway, and by May nearly 650 members had joined the society. The railway re-opened under the control of the Society for the first time on the Whit Monday bank holiday, 14 May 1951, with trains running between Wharf and Rhydyronen stations. Regular trains began to run on 4 June and continued through the summer, with David Curwen acting as the first Chief Mechanical Engineer. One of the volunteers who worked on the railway that month was Vic Mitchell.

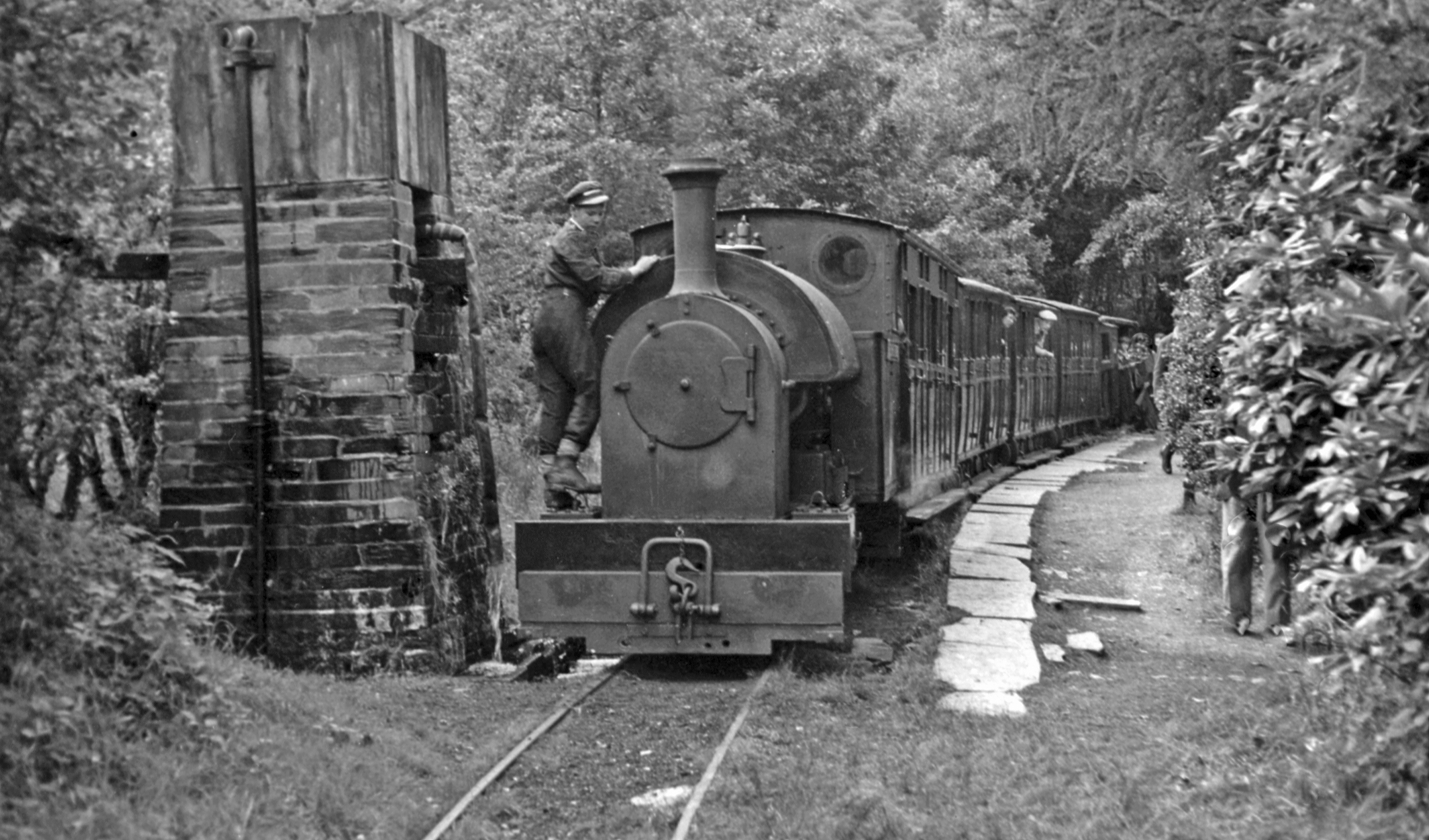
Locomotive No. 4 Edward Thomas with a train at Dolgoch in 1952

In the early years of preservation, the line struggled to operate using the original rolling stock. When the line was taken over in 1950 Dolgoch was the only operating locomotive and it was apparent that it was in need of a major overhaul. To enable operations to continue, two further steam locomotives, Nos. 3 and 4, were purchased from the recently closed Corris Railway in 1951 and named Sir Haydn and Edward Thomas respectively. Because both railways were built to the unusual gauge of 2 ft 3 in (686 mm) it was relatively easy to adapt the Corris locomotives to work on the Talyllyn. No. 3 became the first new locomotive to travel on the railway for over 80 years in 1951, but it frequently derailed, and on inspection it turned out that the Talyllyn track was laid approximately half an inch (13 mm) wider than the official gauge, a deliberate policy by the old company to accommodate the long wheelbase of Talyllyn. Both Talyllyn and Dolgoch had unusually wide wheel treads that allowed them to stay on the wide-of-gauge track. This problem was eventually cured by relaying the railway to its correct gauge and altering Talyllyn's trailing wheels to allow them to swivel horizontally, shortening the locomotive's fixed wheelbase. No. 4 was unserviceable when it arrived, but John Alcock, the chairman of the Hunslet Engine Company, was a member of the Preservation Society and had No. 4 overhauled free of charge at his works. No. 4 then began service on the railway in 1952 and worked the majority of the trains that season.

Another early addition to the locomotive fleet was No. 6 Douglas, donated to the society by the Birmingham engineering firm Abelsons Ltd. This locomotive was built for the depot railway serving RAF Calshot where it worked until 1945, and after rebuilding from its original 2 ft (610 mm) gauge, it entered service in 1954. Through the 1950s the volunteers and staff members of the TRPS rebuilt the line and rescued it from its state of decay, during a period characterised by a "Boy's Own comic spirit of adventure, involving enthusiasm, ingenuity and a fair degree of irresponsibility".

On 22 May 1957 the BBC produced a live outside broadcast from the railway, during which Wynford Vaughan Thomas and Huw Weldon commentated on a trip from Dolgoch to Abergynolwyn. The publicity from this broadcast drew substantial numbers of visitors to the railway that summer, with more than 57,500 passengers carried, and this increase in revenue in turn enabled the railway to continue to improve its infrastructure and provide tourists with a better experience. The following year locomotive No. 1 Talyllyn returned to steam after an extensive overhaul.

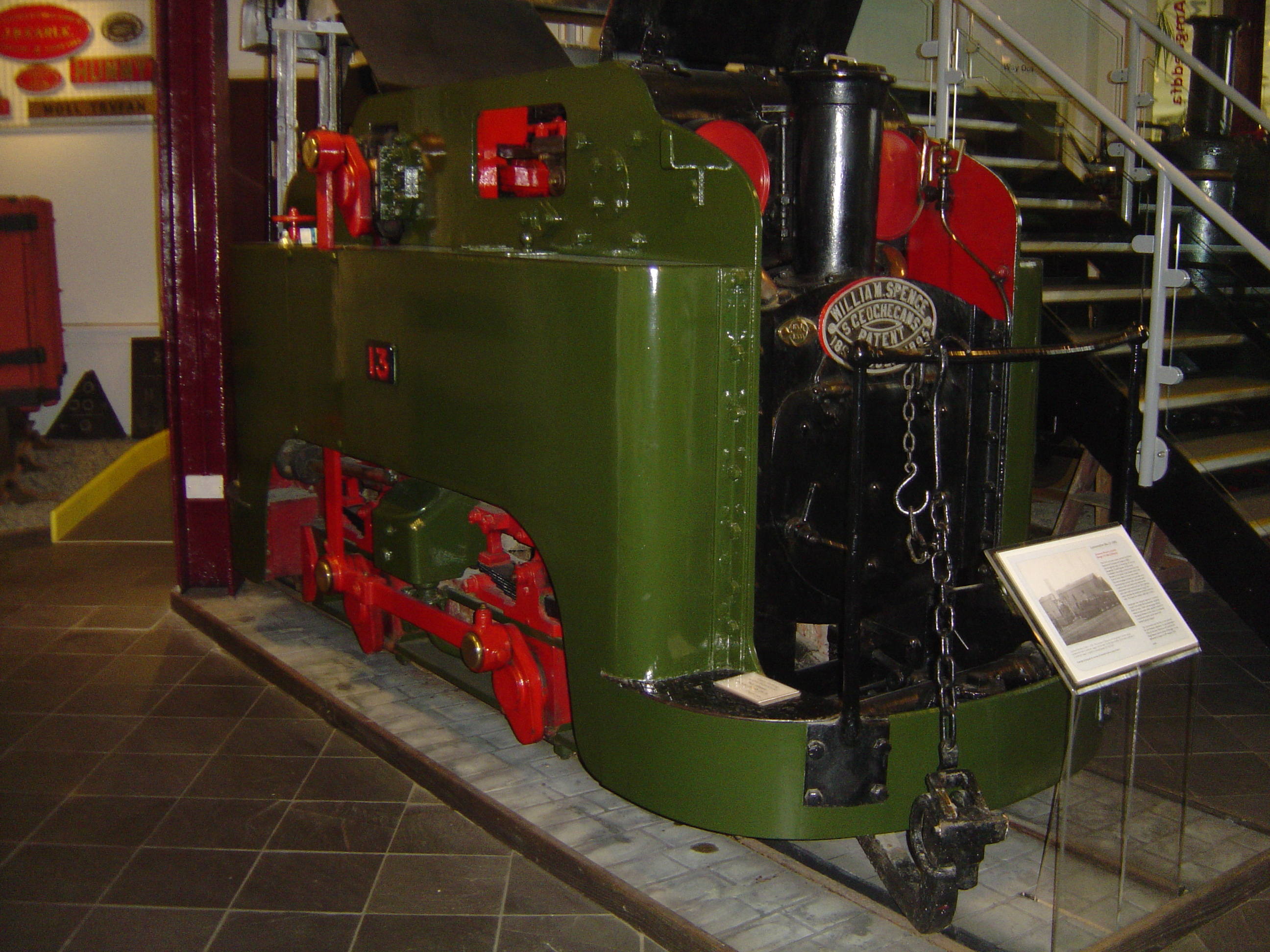
The Guinness brewery locomotive, the first exhibit donated to the Narrow Gauge Railway Museum

An important development during this period was the establishment of the Narrow Gauge Railway Museum at Tywyn Wharf station. The first exhibit for what was to become the museum was a locomotive donated in 1952 by Guinness from their recently closed St. James's Gate Brewery railway. In 1954 the Preservation Society agreed to start work on a formal museum, and exhibits from around the United Kingdom were acquired to form the nucleus of the collection. In 1955 work started on converting the old gunpowder store at Wharf station into a temporary museum building, and in 1956 the first exhibit arrived at Tywyn.

==== Securing the infrastructure: 1960–1969 ====
Tywyn Wharf station in 1964, after layout improvements

The 1960s proved to be a decade of consolidation for the Talyllyn. Pendre works underwent several much-needed expansions, adding additional covered storage for carriages and more workshop room. Modern machine tools, along with proper lighting and a new power supply, were added. Substantial improvements to Tywyn Wharf station were also made, along with continued relaying and upgrading of the track to Abergynolwyn. Passenger numbers continued to climb after the 1957 BBC broadcast; in 1960, 67,000 passenger journeys were made, increasing to 78,500 in 1964. In response to this growing popularity, the railway undertook a programme of new rolling stock construction.

By the early 1960s Tywyn Wharf station was in need of major improvements. Before preservation, the station had contained only a fan of sidings, which meant that there was no way for the locomotive of an arriving train to run round the carriages. As a result, trains were pushed from behind as far as Pendre, where the locomotive could be moved past the carriages to the front of the train. A loop was installed at Wharf in 1952, being used from the start of the 1952 season, to avoid having to propel trains to Pendre, but in the winter of 1964/65 a major upgrade of the station was carried out. This improved the track layout and extended the original office building to provide covered accommodation for passengers and a shop.

As passenger numbers continued to grow during the late 1960s it became clear that further motive power was needed, especially as the rebuilt No. 1 was not performing well. The Talyllyn's unusual track gauge and restricted loading gauge meant that it was unlikely that a locomotive could be found that could work on the line unaltered, so in 1969 a 3 ft (914 mm) gauge steam locomotive was purchased from the Bord na Mona (Irish Peat Board) with a view to rebuilding it for use on the Talyllyn. This locomotive was unofficially known as Irish Pete, a nod to its original use.

==== Extension to Nant Gwernol: 1969–1980 ====
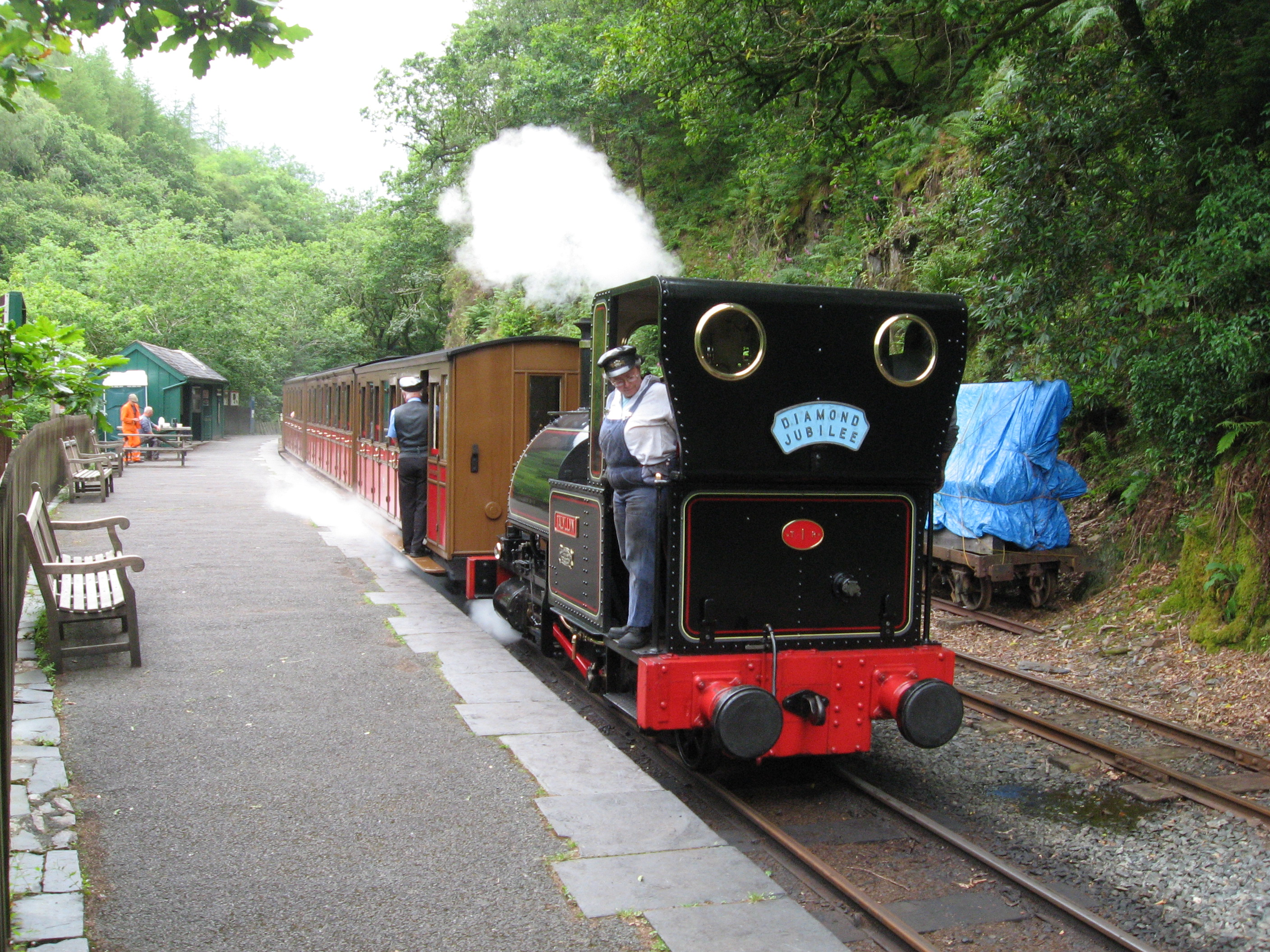
Nant Gwernol station

The preservation society had long held ambitions to extend the railway along the former mineral extension from Abergynolwyn to the foot of the Alltwyllt incline, and as early as 1959 work had begun to trace the owners of the land that the extension traversed. Planning began in the mid-1960s, but construction did not start until 1968 when the winding house for the Abergynolwyn village incline was demolished. To bring the line up to passenger standards some of the curves needed to be eased, and this required blasting work, as the line runs on a narrow ledge on the hillside at this point. The extension and new station at Nant Gwernol were opened on 22 May 1976 by Wynford Vaughan Thomas, who drove in the ceremonial "golden spike" to complete the extension. Despite this official opening ceremony, minor work still remained to bring the extension to the standard required to run regular passenger trains, but regular train services began on 29 May 1976.

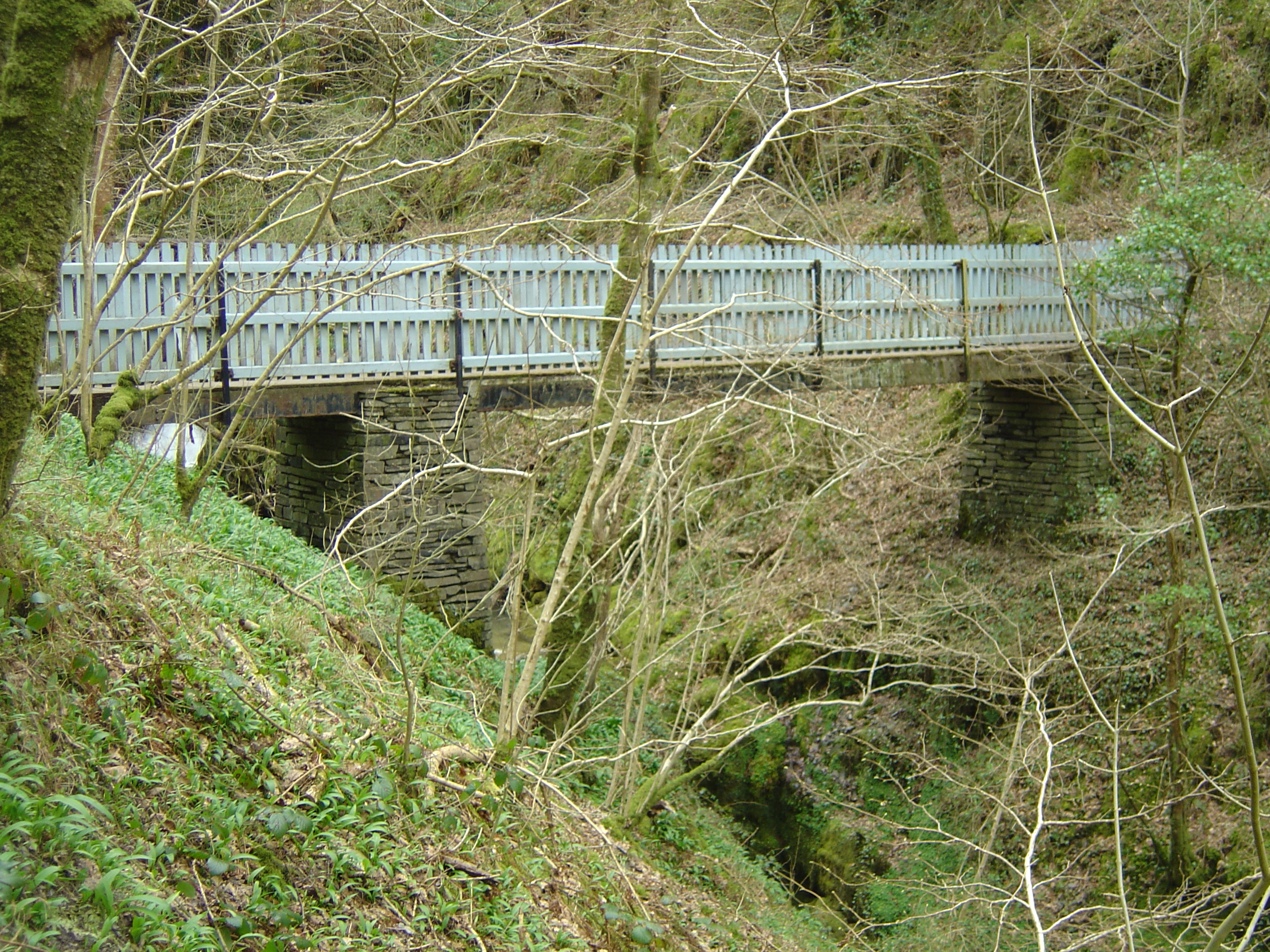
The footbridge across the Nant Gwernol

Although the extension of the railway was completed in 1976, work in the vicinity continued with the creation of footpaths connecting to the new station. A new footbridge was built crossing the Nant Gwernol gorge and connecting the station with the existing path on the east side of the river. The bridge and paths were opened on 3 May 1980 by Lord Parry, the chairman of the Wales Tourist Board. By the mid-1970s, it had become clear that passenger numbers were no longer increasing. After 1973, the peak year for passengers on the Talyllyn with 186,000 passenger journeys made, numbers were to decline consistently until the 1990s. Preliminary work on the conversion of Irish Pete for use on the Talyllyn, which had begun in the early 1970s, was put on hold in 1975 and the chassis and boiler were put into storage at Pendre.

==== Consolidation: 1980–2001 ====
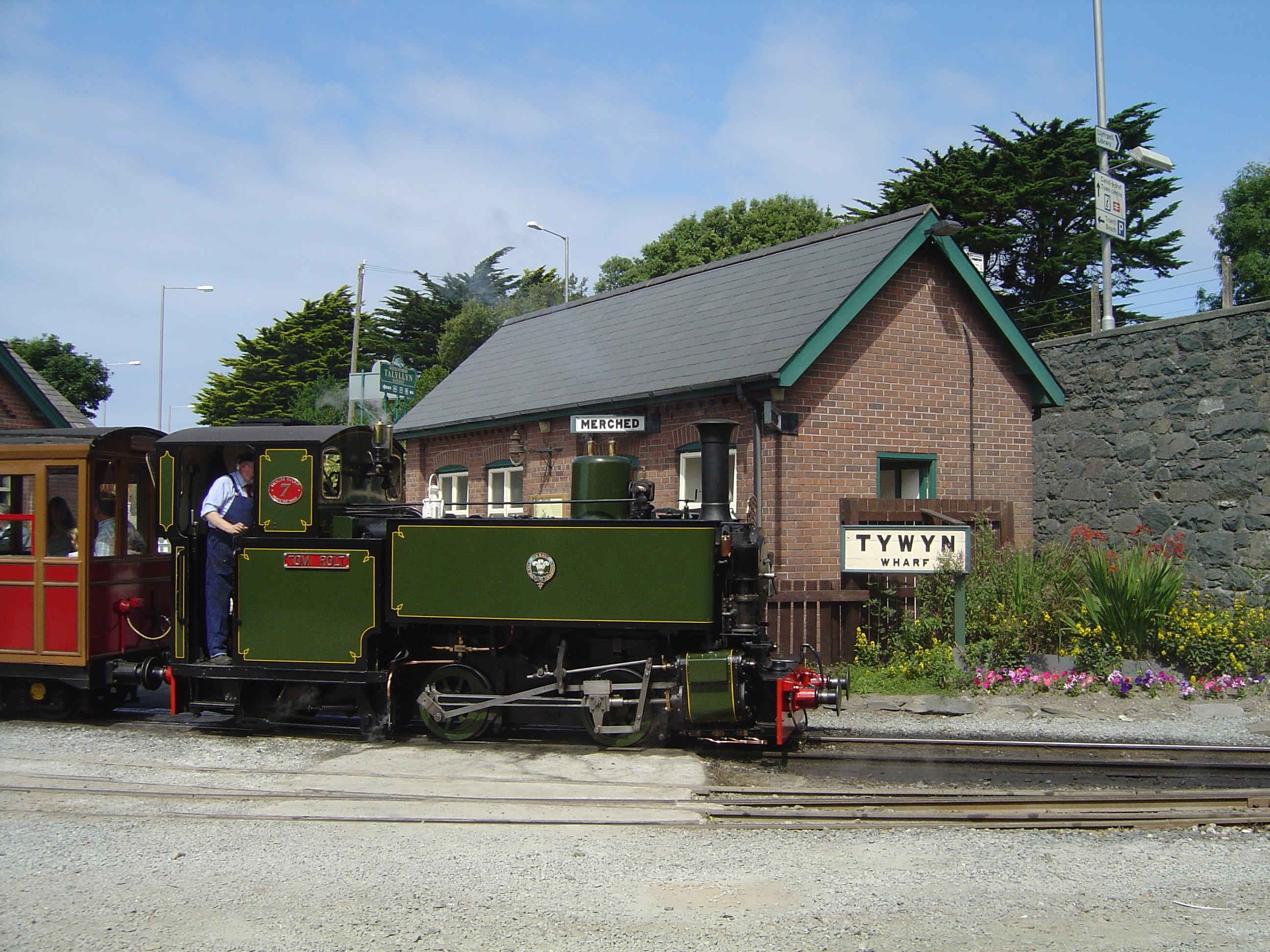
Locomotive No. 7 Tom Rolt at Tywyn Wharf station

With passenger numbers falling and the line extended to Nant Gwernol, the railway entered a period of consolidation. By 1987, the boiler on locomotive No. 6 Douglas was life expired and in need of replacement. Consideration was given to reviving the project to build a new locomotive from the components of Irish Pete instead of purchasing a new boiler for Douglas, and in early 1988 work recommenced on the rebuilding of the ex-Bord na Mona locomotive. A new design for an 0-4-2 side tank locomotive was prepared by the railway's Chief Engineer John Bate, which reused the chassis and boiler from the locomotive with a new superstructure and the addition of trailing wheels, and the new locomotive, officially named Tom Rolt after the Preservation Society's first chairman, was put into service on 6 May 1991. During this period further expansions of both Tywyn Wharf and Pendre stations were undertaken, and Abergynolwyn station, which had been rebuilt as part of the Nant Gwernol extension in the 1970s, was expanded further to provide an additional attraction at the eastern end of the line.

One major anomaly remained in the railway's operations: the Regulation of Railways Act 1889 had required, amongst other measures, that all British passenger trains be fitted with continuous brakes. McConnel had secured an exemption for the Talyllyn Railway, on the basis that the low speed of operation meant they were unnecessary and that the cost of compliance would bankrupt the enterprise, but by the end of the 1990s the Railway Inspectorate was insisting that the Talyllyn be brought into compliance with the act, a little over 100 years after it had passed. By 2001, the railway had fitted its entire passenger fleet with the necessary equipment, operated by air brake pumps mounted on the locomotives.

==== New museum: 2001–2019 ====
The Preservation Society celebrated its 50th anniversary in 2001, and as part of the year of celebrations a major new project was launched to once more extend and improve facilities at Tywyn Wharf station. For many years the station had been home to semi-permanent buildings housing the Narrow Gauge Railway Museum, but the new plans for the station included the construction of a new two-storey building to house the museum and the extension of the existing station building to house a new cafe and booking office. Work began on the first phase of the project in January 2002. In 2003 the railway received a £682,500 Heritage Lottery grant towards the £1,170,000 cost of redeveloping Wharf station, and the new station and museum were officially opened by Prince Charles (later King Charles III) and Camilla, then Duchess of Cornwall, on 13 July 2005. The railway has seen a steady increase in passengers carried since the turn of the millennium, with nearly 51,000 passenger bookings and 95,500 passenger journeys recorded in 2006, although this figure is still only around half the peak figure carried in 1973. In 2011, the railway celebrated 60 years of preservation, and received an Engineering Heritage Award from the Institution of Mechanical Engineers in recognition of its importance in Welsh industrial heritage. In 2011 the railway celebrated the 60th anniversary of its rescue by the volunteers of 1951.

In April 2012 locomotive No.2 Dolgoch appeared at the Steel Steam and Stars Gala at the Llangollen Railway, running on a temporary section of narrow gauge track. This was the first time that Dolgoch had operated away from its home railway in 146 years. In June 2013 the railway was awarded the Queen's Award for Voluntary Service. 2015 was the 150th anniversary of the official opening of the railway, and this was celebrated with a series of events throughout the year.

==== COVID-19 and World Heritage Site: 2020–present ====
Like many other tourist attractions, the railway was badly affected by the world-wide COVID pandemic in 2020, losing 60% of its annual revenue. The railway recovered the following year, nearly matching its pre-COVID revenue from 2019. The railway introduced a subscription-based control centre with webcams, enabling users to view the location of trains in real time. This won the Internal Communications Award at the Heritage Railway Association annual awards ceremony in 2021.

In 2021, the Slate Landscape of North-west Wales, which includes the Talyllyn Railway and Bryn Eglwys Quarry, was designated a World Heritage Site. As part of the bid for World Heritage status, the Talyllyn formed a Heritage Working group, aimed at restoring the water tower at Ty Dwr, on the extension between Abergynolwyn and Nant Gwernol. This was completed in 2022. Other restoration projects include the restoration of the winding drum on the village incline, in progress as of 2024, and the building of a replica of the original diesel No. 5. In 2024, a standard gauge wagon was positioned beside the transshipment siding at Tywyn Wharf, to demonstrate how slates were transferred from narrow gauge to standard gauge.

== Today ==
The Talyllyn Railway remains a successful and popular tourist attraction. The original 1860s locomotives and passenger stock still run regularly alongside the roster of more modern rolling stock. The railway is promoted as one of The Great Little Trains of Wales, a joint marketing scheme launched in 1970 that encompasses ten narrow gauge railways in the country, mostly found in north and mid Wales.

=== Special events ===
The railway operates a programme of special events throughout the year. These have included in the past the Anything-Goes Gala, Have-A-Go Gala, Tom Rolt Steam and Vintage Rally and Victorian Week. Occasional events are based on locomotives masquerading as their fictional counterparts from the Skarloey Railway. Since 1984 there has been an annual running event called Race the Train, which follows the railway track 7 miles (11 km) from Tywyn to Abergynolwyn and back again. The challenge is for runners to complete the 14-mile (23 km) cross country route faster than the train, which takes around 1 hour 47 minutes.

=== Young Members Group ===
The Young Members Group (YMG) are members and volunteers of the Talyllyn Railway Preservation Society who are between the ages of 14 and 25. On occasions during the peak season, the Railway has held Young Members Days in which the youngest qualified people available that day run the railway.

== Route ==
Map of the Talyllyn Railway

Map of the Talyllyn Railway.

=== Original passenger line ===
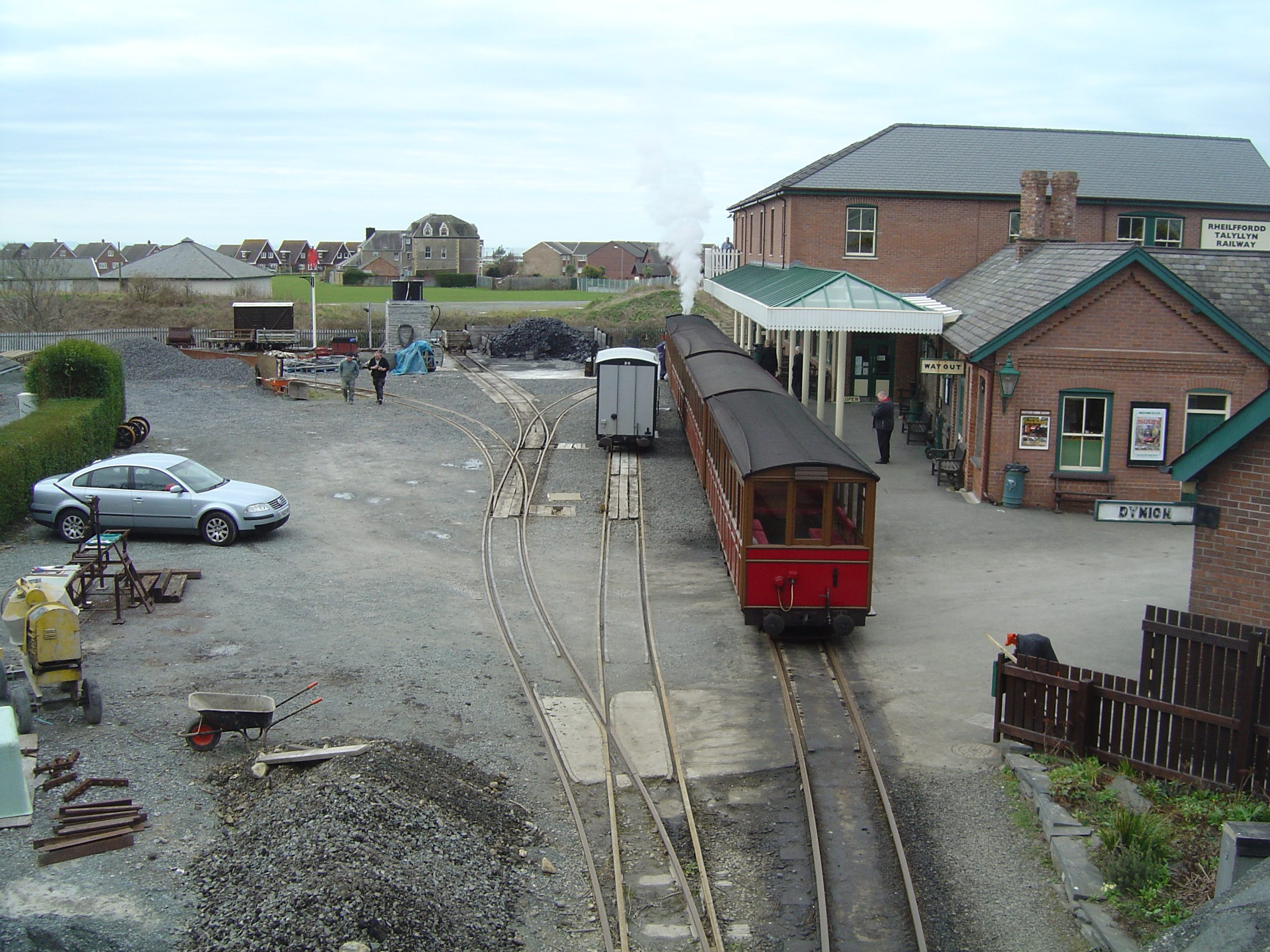
Tywyn Wharf station, 2008

The main terminus of the line is at Tywyn Wharf (originally known as King's Station, after a local landowner), where the railway's administrative headquarters and the Narrow Gauge Railway Museum are located. When the line carried traffic from the quarry, slates were transferred to the Cambrian Railways on the transhipment sidings. Leaving Wharf station, which stands at an elevation of 40 ft (12 m) above sea level, the line passes immediately under the A493 (Machynlleth to Dolgellau road) and enters a long cutting that climbs towards Pendre, at a maximum gradient of 1 in 60. On the left (north) side of the cutting there was once a long siding used for gravity shunting of wagons into the sidings at Wharf station. The railway runs through the cutting for about 0.5 miles (800 m), before passing under another road bridge and passing the locomotive and carriage sheds and works at Pendre.

From Pendre, the railway passes over a gated level crossing and runs beside an industrial estate before climbing up to Ty Mawr bridge and on to Hendy, the first of five minor halts, which serves the adjacent farm. The railway runs in an approximately north-easterly direction along the Fathew valley, mainly through fields of local farms on the valley floor, although this is where some of the steepest gradients on the line are to be found. The ruling gradient of the line is 1 in 60.

More local halts follow at Fach Goch, and Cynfal, the latter having a small platform. The section from Cynfal to Rhydyronen was relaid in 1951 using rail purchased from the Corris Railway after the latter line's closure in 1948. Rhydyronen, a request stop, was the first intermediate station built on the line, opening in 1867. A siding at the station was shortened in 1957 and removed completely circa 1975. A short steep climb under a road bridge follows the station, followed by a slight downhill gradient. Unlike the Ffestiniog Railway, the Talyllyn was not designed to be worked as a gravity line, however this is the only downhill section between Pendre and Nant Gwernol. Another minor halt follows at Tynllwynhen, before the passing loop and request stop at Brynglas.

Above Brynglas, the line crosses the Cwm Pandy stream and enters a shallow cutting, climbing as it goes. The cutting ends at a road overbridge after which the line runs through open countryside as it starts to ascend the valley side on a ledge. After approximately 0.75 miles (1,210 m) it enters woodlands west of Dolgoch, climbing steadily, then curves to the south east and crosses the Dolgoch gorge on the Dolgoch viaduct, which carries the line 51 ft (16 m) above the Dolgoch ravine. Dolgoch station is immediately east of the viaduct, situated on a left-hand curve at 187 ft (57 m) above sea level, and is the main intermediate station on the line, being popular with tourists visiting the nearby falls. The railway continues in a north easterly direction, curving through the woods and climbing the valley side. It shortly passes Quarry Siding, where a halt and passing loop are located; this is the site of a small old shale quarry, the rock from which was used for ballasting on the railway. A large permanent way and storage shed opened on the site in 2013. The line continues its ascent towards Abergynolwyn station, situated on a ledge cut into the hillside.

=== Abergynolwyn to Nant Gwernol ===
Map of the Abergynolwyn Village Branch

The original terminus of the statutory railway was Abergynolwyn, beyond which the railway continued as a 0.75-mile (1.21 km) long mineral extension, now converted for passenger use. The extension was originally sharply curved, as the line turns south east into the steeply sided Nant Gwernol gorge, but these curves were eased when conversion for passenger use took place in 1976. The whole section is within woods, now owned by the Natural Resources Wales. Shortly after crossing over the forestry road, the line reaches Ty Dwr, where the original locomotive shed stood from 1865 until it was demolished after Pendre works opened in 1867. A slate water tower at this point was in use into the 1950s, and was rebuilt in 2022.

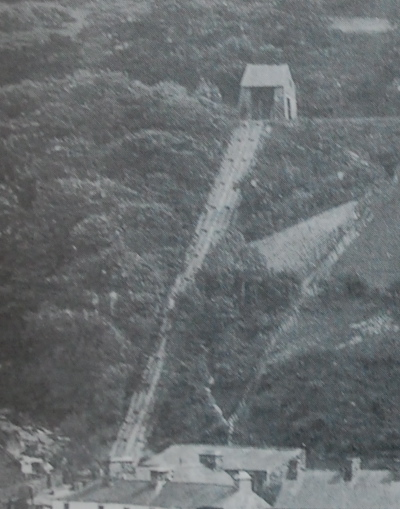
The village incline from the north west, around 1880

After passing the site of Ty Dwr the railway bends around 'Amen' corner, and soon after the Village Incline is reached. From here the line runs into the gorge, high above the river on a narrow ledge, ending at the foot of the first incline leading to the Bryn Eglwys quarry. The original line fanned out into a set of three sidings, used to marshal trains of loaded slate wagons coming down from the quarry and empty wagons waiting to ascend. Nant Gwernol station, the eastern terminus of the line, was built on the site of the sidings.

The village of Abergynolwyn was built to house the quarrymen of Bryn Eglwys and their families, and to serve the village an incline with winding house was laid three quarters of the way along the mineral extension. The winding house for the incline stood on the narrow ledge, with the mineral line passing through it. The two-track incline dropped 150 ft (46 m) over a distance of 363 ft (111 m). At its foot, the line crossed the Nant Gwernol on a girder bridge. Immediately after the bridge, short lines branched off to the east from a wagon turntable to the coal yard and smithy of Pandy Farm, and west to a writing slate factory (later a carpenter's yard). The main branch then splits to form a storage loop, with a further wagon turntable and a longer branch serving the houses and school to the north east. The main branch continued north, crossing the main road then passing between the two main terraces in the village before ending in a turntable and a final short line connecting to the Capel Jerusalem chapel. The village incline was lifted during the early years of preservation, to provide much needed rail to replace the existing track. The winding house was demolished in 1968 to allow realignment of the railway to form the extension to Nant Gwernol.

=== Galltymoelfre Tramway ===
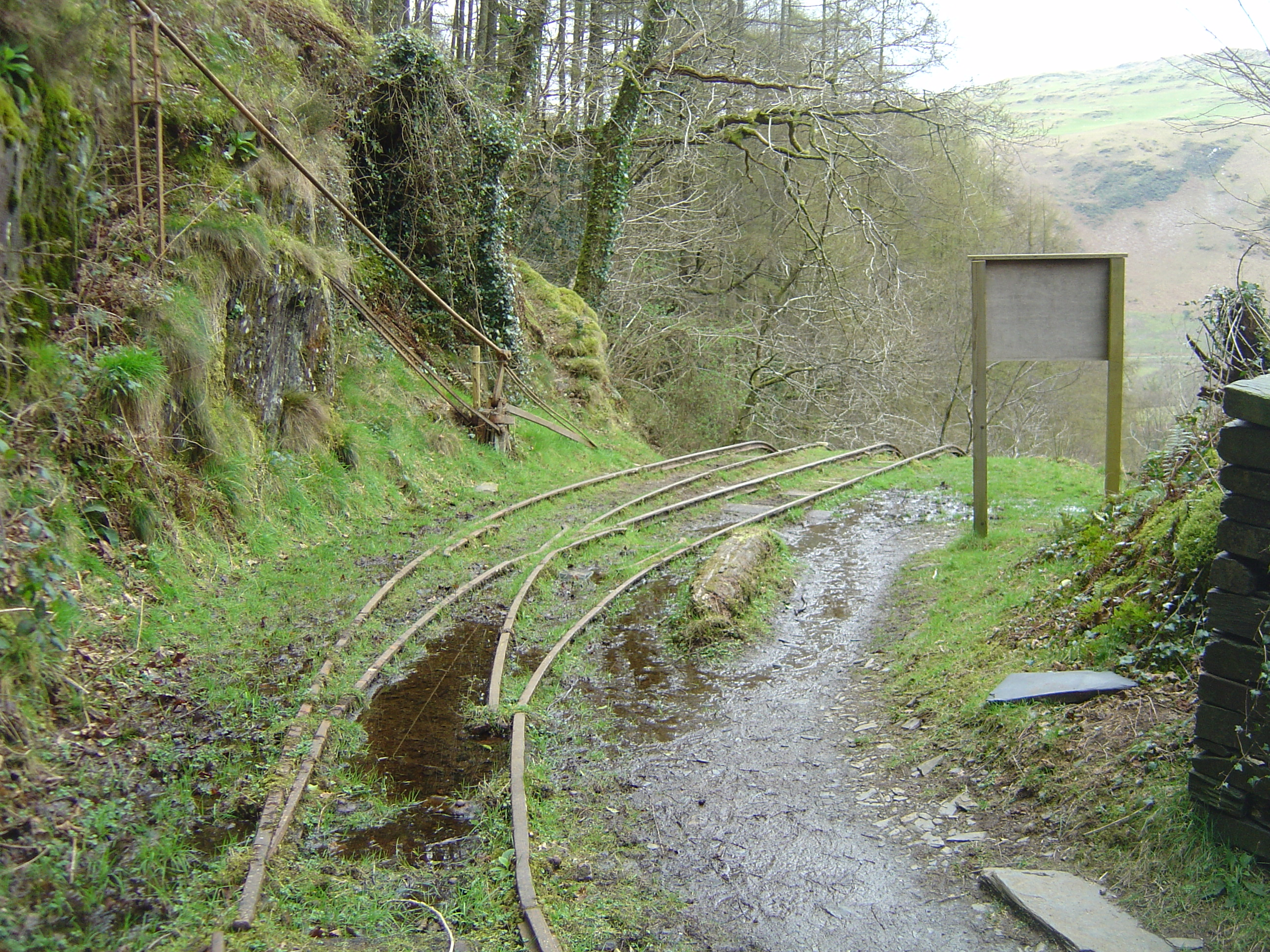
The head of the Alltwyllt incline at the end of the Nant Gwernol extension in 2008

Until the closure of the quarries in 1946, the line east from Abergynolwyn was worked as a mineral tramway – only slate and goods trains serving Bryn Eglwys ran on this section. The quarry lay about one mile (1.6 km) south-east of Nant Gwernol station and 300 ft (91 m) above it, with a further mineral tramway connecting the quarry with the railway. What is now Nant Gwernol station was the terminus of the Talyllyn Railway proper. Here the line fanned out into a set of sidings where inbound trains were left and outbound slate trains assembled. The sidings were located on a narrow ledge in the side of the Nant Gwernol gorge.

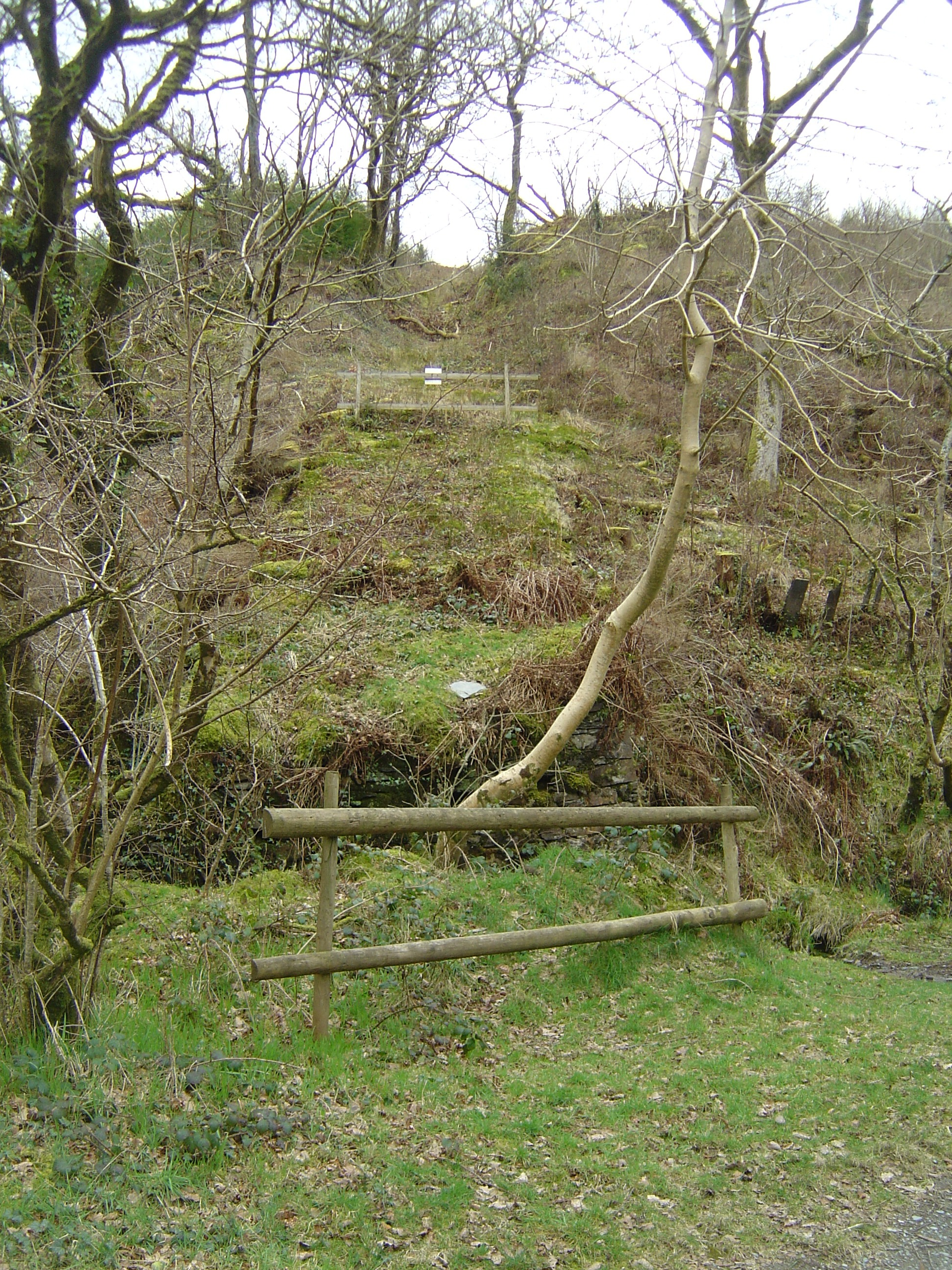
The Cantrybedd Incline at the end of the Galltymoelfre Tramway

Rising south-east from the end of the sidings was the 633 ft (193 m) long, double-track gravity-operated, Alltwyllt incline, from the top of which the Galltymoelfre Tramway ran south-east towards the quarry for about 0.5 miles (800 m). The tramway was originally laid in light bridge rail though sections were relaid in flat-bottomed rail later in its life. It was worked for its entire existence using horses. The tramway ended at the foot of the Cantrybedd incline, a 440 ft (130 m) long double-track, gravity-operated incline. This final incline rose to the north edge of Bryn Eglwys quarry, reaching a height of 612 ft (187 m) above sea level.

== Operation ==
The line has six steam locomotives for passenger trains and four diesel locomotives, which are primarily used for shunting and to haul works trains. It is unusual for all steam locomotives to be operable at the same time, as at least one is normally scheduled for overhaul. The railway also owns 23 carriages and vans, including all of the original carriages and the brake van built for the railway.

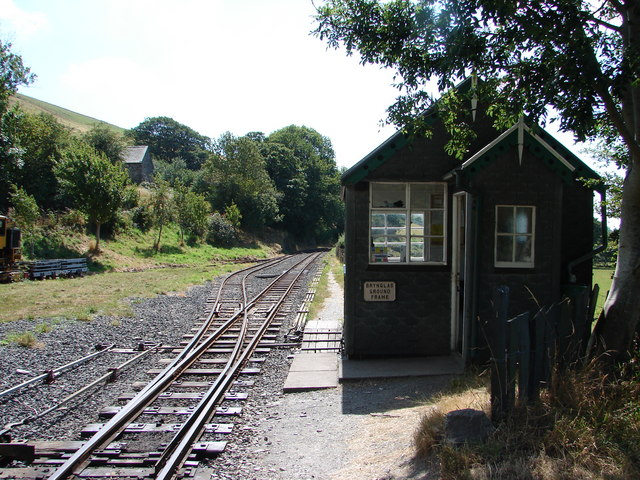
Brynglas block-post

The railway is single track, so special measures have to be taken to prevent collisions. Before preservation, the railway operated a "one engine in steam" policy, but with growing passenger numbers it became necessary to install passing loops, and a more stringent method of single line control was introduced. The line is worked by Electric Key tokens installed in 1973, which authorise the driver to enter a section of single line, and these are interlocked to prevent more than one token being withdrawn for a section at any one time. There is a loop at Pendre, which was used from the opening of the railway for shunting purposes, and further loops were installed at Brynglas in 1953 and Quarry Siding in 1963. When the Nant Gwernol extension opened in 1976, Abergynolwyn also became a passing loop.

Each passing loop is controlled by a small signal box, known as a block-post. These house the lever frames that control the points, the token equipment and telephones. The railway has few signals; instead it has stop boards at Pendre, Brynglas, Quarry Siding and Nant Gwernol, and the blockman allows trains to proceed by use of flags. There are colour light signals located at Tywyn Wharf, operated from the Control Office, and disc signals controlled from the ground frame. Abergynolwyn has colour light signals, which are operated from the blockpost. When the block-post is unmanned, it is the responsibility of the locomotive crew to change the token before proceeding.

== In popular culture ==
=== The Railway Series ===
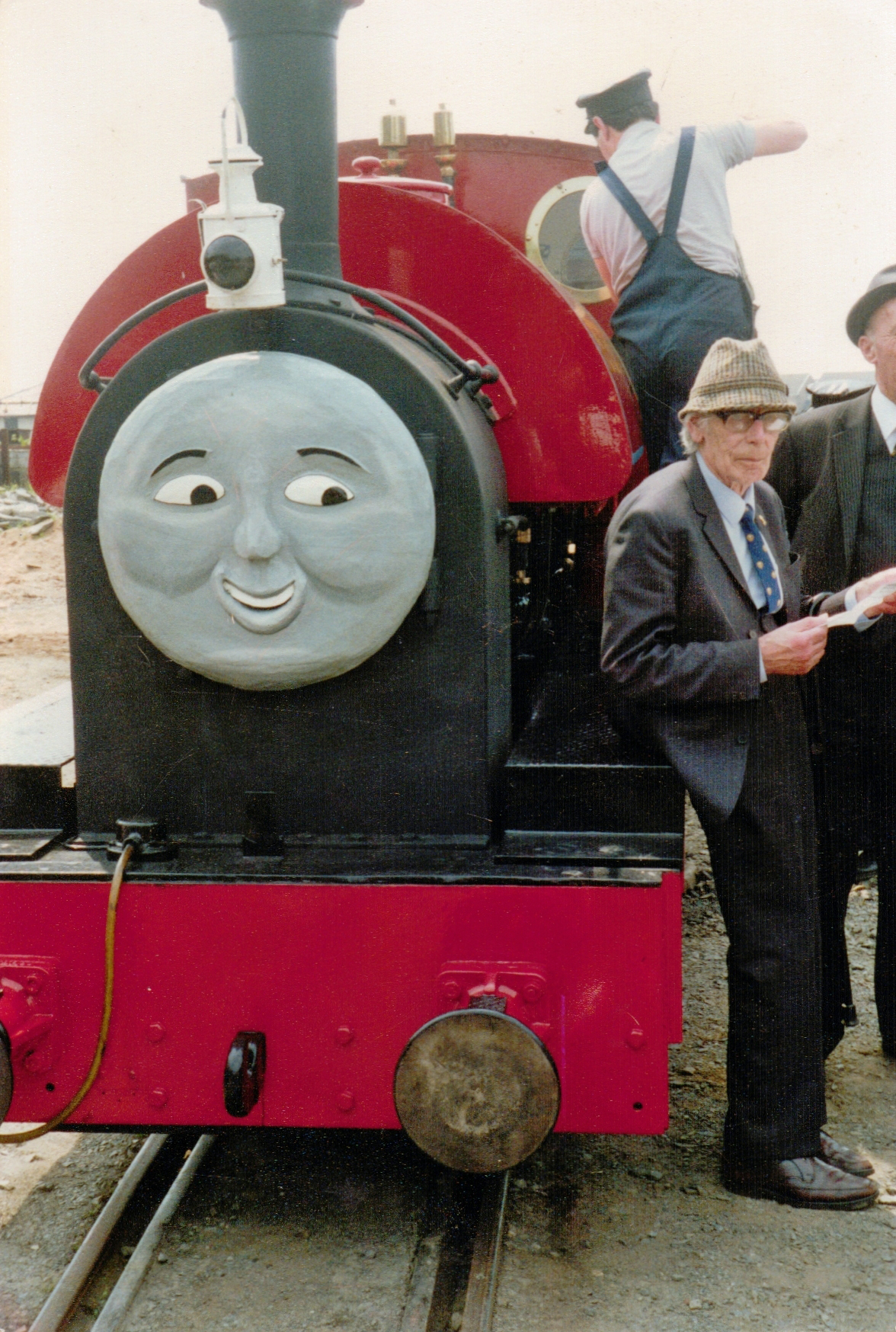
Wilbert Awdry and Edward Thomas in the guise of Skarloey Railway Peter Sam

The Talyllyn Railway is represented in The Railway Series books by the Reverend W. Awdry and its television adaptation Thomas & Friends as the Skarloey Railway; most of the fictional locomotives are based on real-life equivalents. Awdry visited the line on a family holiday in the early days of preservation and became involved as a volunteer soon afterwards. Several of the stories in The Railway Series come from his real-life experiences at the Talyllyn, and some of the books contain full-page illustrations of Talyllyn locomotives. One of Awdry's early experiences as a volunteer guard was waving for a train to depart Abergynolwyn too soon, causing the line's Refreshment Lady to miss the train; an event adapted in both the books and the TV series. His son Christopher and his wife Diana, and their son Richard, would all volunteer with the Talyllyn as well. Wilbert's study along with his model trains were donated to the Talyllyn after his death and placed on display in the Narrow Gauge Railway Museum. In 2021 the railway began hosting the Awdry Extravaganza sharing lectures on The Railway Series from the Awdry study collection, and displaying artefacts and fan creations related to The Railway Series and Thomas & Friends. The railway was briefly threatened legally by TV series creator Britt Allcroft for using the characters without paying her production company licensing fees; however, since the railway's agreement to use the Skarloey Railway characters predated the TV series, the railway was able to continue using them without licensing them as part of Day Out with Thomas.

=== The Titfield Thunderbolt ===
The preservation of the Talyllyn Railway by volunteers was the inspiration for the 1953 film The Titfield Thunderbolt, an Ealing Studios comedy about a group of villagers attempting to run a service on a disused branch line after closure. T. E. B. Clarke, the script writer for the film, had heard about the preservation of the Talyllyn and spent a day on the railway in 1951, and some of the early incidents in preservation were incorporated into the film. In the book Railway Adventure, Tom Rolt recalled that he had hoped the film might be produced on the Talyllyn, but it was eventually filmed on the recently closed Camerton branch of the Bristol and North Somerset Railway line along the Cam Brook valley in Somerset. The actor Hugh Griffith, who played Dan in the film, was a friend of Tom Rolt and an early vice-president of the preservation society.

=== Railway with a Heart of Gold ===
In 1953, the American film producer Carson "Kit" Davidson produced a documentary film entitled Railway with a Heart of Gold, (Note: The film is available to view on the Internet Archive at Railway with a Heart of Gold.) portraying the early days of preservation. Some incidents were staged for the film, such as a piece falling off the locomotive, which Davidson later described as "corny". However most of the film was simply a record of the work and incidents that took place on the railway at the time, including a dramatic shot of Sir Haydn derailing due to the poor condition of the track at the time. The film, which was preserved by the Academy Film Archive in 2012, ends with the quote "It is a relic, this railway, a bit of ornamental scrollwork lifted from the pattern of yesterday and kept as a memento."

== See also ==
- British narrow gauge railways
- List of 2 ft 3 in gauge railways
- List of British heritage and private railways
- Tourism in Wales

== Bibliography ==
- Bate, J. H. L. (2001). The Chronicles of Pendre Sidings. RailRomances. ISBN 1-900622-05-X.
- Boyd, James I. C. (1965). Narrow Gauge Railways in Mid Wales. Oakwood Press. ISBN 0-85361-024-X.
- Boyd, James I. C. (1988). The Tal-y-llyn Railway. Wild Swan Publications Ltd. ISBN 0-906867-46-0.
- Castens, Simon (2001). On the Trail of The Titfield Thunderbolt. Thunderbolt Books. ISBN 0-9538771-0-8.
- Cozens, Lewis (1948). The Tal-y-llyn Railway. Privately printed.
- Drummond, Ian (2015). Rails Along The Fathew. Holne Publishings. ISBN 978-0-9563317-8-6.
- Fuller, Martin (2017). Talyllyn & Corris Steam Locomotives, Volume 2: Early Preservation and Locomotive Rebuilds. Sara Eade Publishing. ISBN 978-0-9935828-3-7.
- Goddin, Geoff (September 2002). "Whose Heritage Railway is it? A Study of Volunteer Motivation" (PDF). Japan Railway & Transport Review. 32: 46–49. Archived from the original (PDF) on 26 March 2009.
- Holmes, Alan (2009). Talyllyn Revived. The Talyllyn Railway. ISBN 978-0-900317-07-1.
- Household, H. G. W. & Eldson, O. (June 1926). "The Tal-y-llyn Railway". Railway Magazine. Vol. 58. pp. 431–435.
- Huntley, John (1969). Railways in the Cinema. Ian Allan.
- Johnson, Peter (1997). The Heyday of the Welsh Narrow Gauge. Ian Allan. ISBN 0-7110-2511-8.
- Johnson, Peter (1999). Welsh Narrow Gauge: a view from the past. Ian Allan. ISBN 0-7110-2654-8.
- Johnson, Peter & Weaver, Rodney (1987). Great Preserved Locomotives: Talyllyn Railway No 1 Talyllyn & No 2 Dolgoch. Ian Allan. ISBN 0-7110-1711-5.
- Mitchell, David J. & Eyres, Terry (2005). The Talyllyn Railway. Past and Present Publishing Ltd. ISBN 1-85895-125-9.
- Potter, D. (1990). The Talyllyn Railway. David St John Thomas. ISBN 0-946537-50-X.
- Ransom, P. J. G. (1996). Narrow Gauge Steam: Its origins and world-wide development. Oxford Publishing Co. ISBN 0-86093-533-7.
- Richards, Alun John (1999). The Slate Regions of North and Mid Wales, and their Railways. Carreg Gwalch. ISBN 0-86381-552-9.
- Rolt, L. T. C. (1998). Railway Adventure. Sutton Publishing. ISBN 0-330-02783-2.
- Rolt, L. T. C., ed. (1965). Talyllyn Century. David & Charles.
- Thomas, Cliff (2002). The Narrow Gauge in Britain and Ireland. Atlantic Publishing. ISBN 1-902827-05-8.
- Waite, James (2023). Talyllyn Railway: A Journey By Steam. Narrow Gauge Album No. 2. Chippenham, Wilts, UK: Mainline & Maritime. ISBN 9781900340663. Archived from the original on 17 April 2023.
- Woodcock, G. George (September 1938). "The Tal-y-llyn Railway". Railway Magazine. Vol. 83, no. 495. pp. 197–200.
