= Broad Water =

Lagoon in Gwynedd, Wales

Coordinates: 52.6023°N 4.0964°W

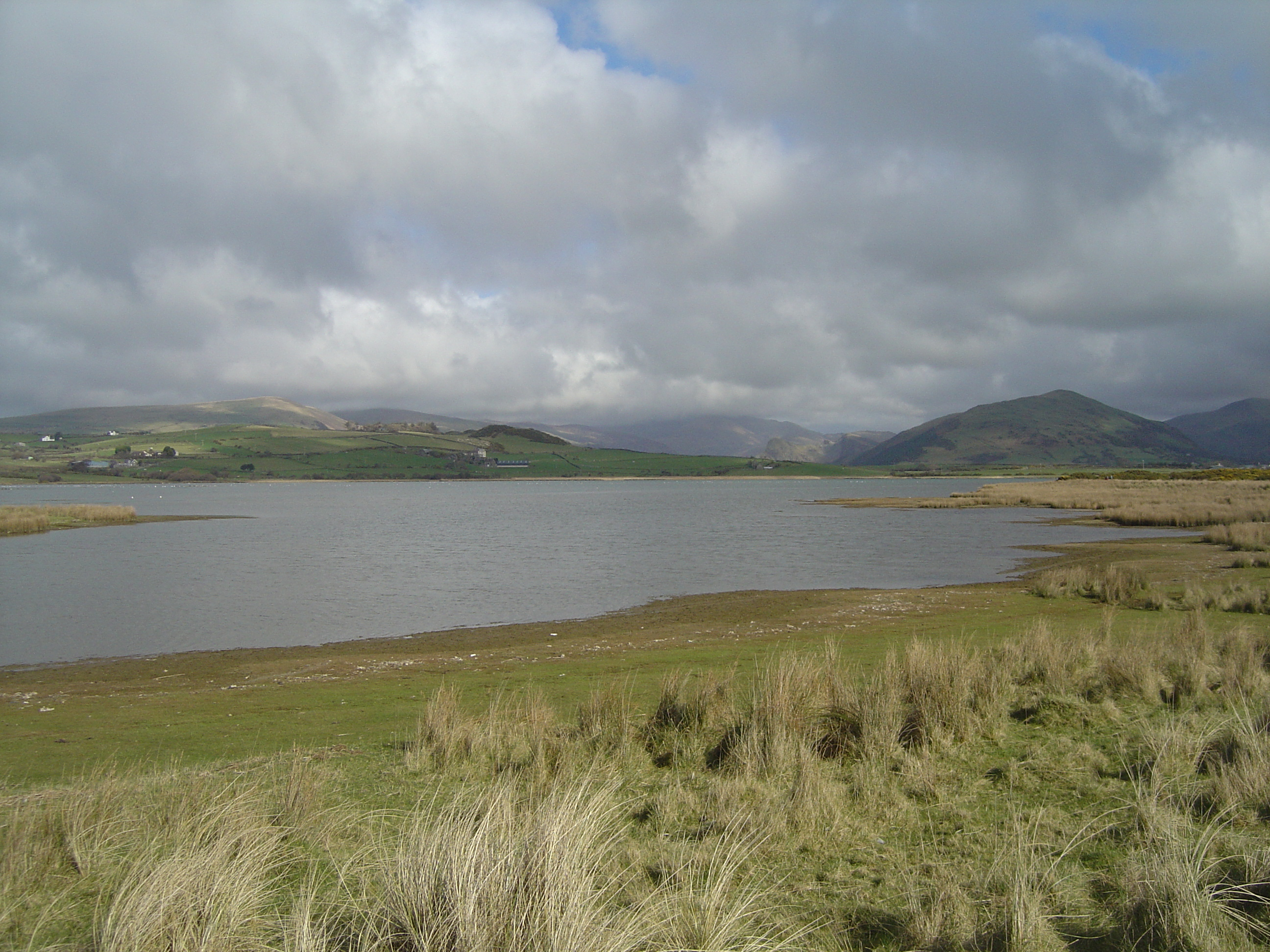
- Broad Water, looking north-east. The outflow is to the left.

- Location within Wales
- Type: Lagoon
- Primary inflows: River Dysynni
- Primary outflows: Cardigan Bay

Broad Water, or Broadwater (Welsh: Aber Dysynni) is a salt water lagoon near Tywyn, Wales formed from the silted up estuary of the River Dysynni. In the eighteenth and nineteenth centuries, the estuary was used by the shipbuilding industry, as small sailing ships were launched to carry peat from the local peat bogs. This industry was abandoned in the nineteenth century when the estuary became too silted up, forming the lagoon. The outflow of the lagoon flows beneath a railway bridge before entering Cardigan Bay.

The area is a haven for many wetland birds, and it has been designated as a Site of Special Scientific Interest.
