= Bryncrug =

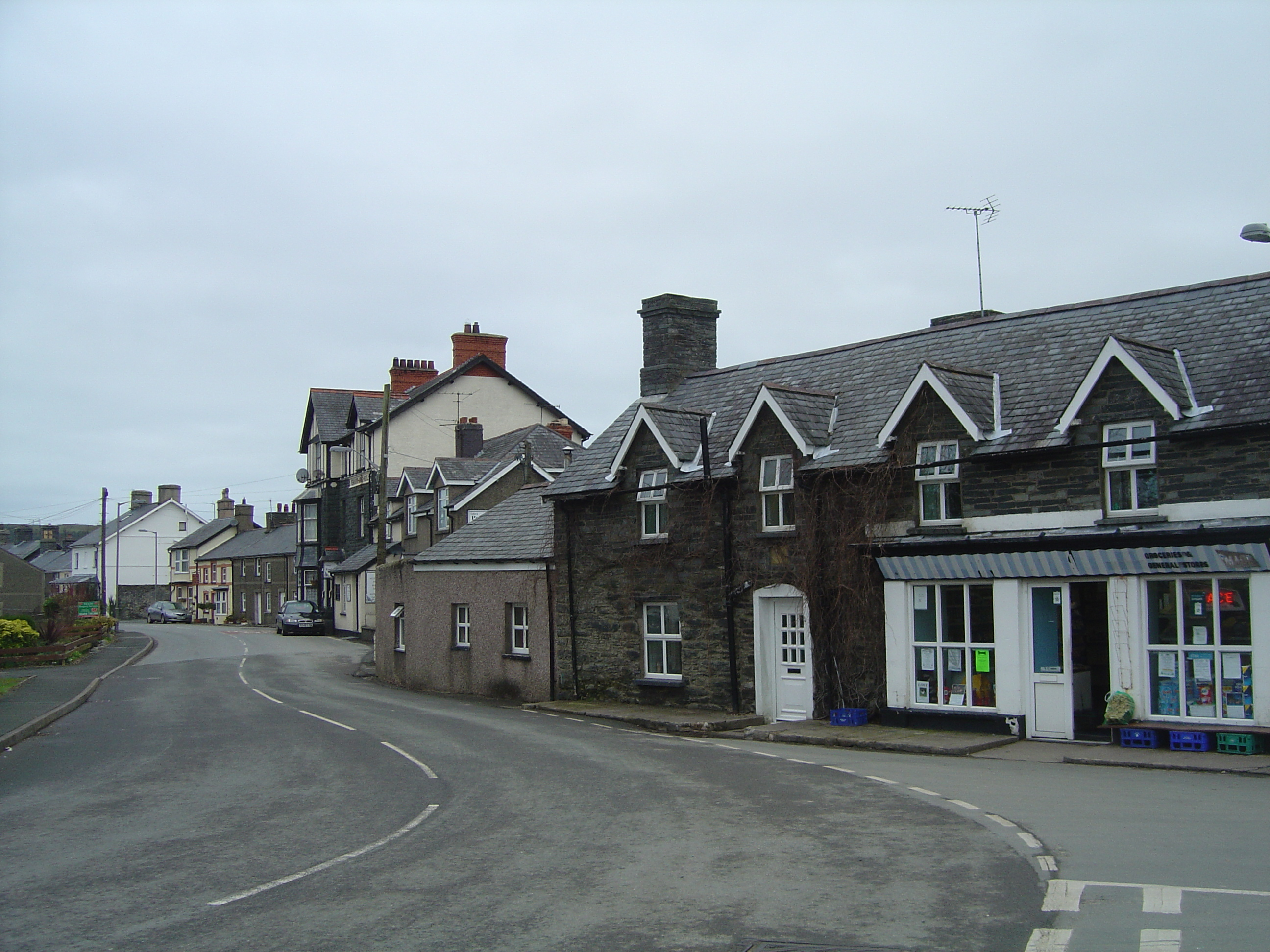
- Bryncrug

- Location within Gwynedd
- Population: 622 (2011)
- OS grid reference: SH607032
- Community: Bryn-crug
- Principal area: Gwynedd
- Country: Wales
- Sovereign state: United Kingdom
- Post town: TYWYN
- Postcode district: LL36
- Dialling code: 01654
- Police: North Wales
- Fire: North Wales
- Ambulance: Welsh
- UK Parliament: Dwyfor Meirionnydd
- Senedd Cymru – Welsh Parliament: Gwynedd Maldwyn
- List of places UK Wales Gwynedd 52.608°N 4.056°W Map of the community

Bryncrug (Welsh pronunciation), sometimes spelt Bryn-crug, is a village and community in Gwynedd, Wales. Afon Fathew flows through the village and into the River Dysynni. The village is situated to the north east of the town of Tywyn, at the junction of the A493 and B4405 roads. Although the village is usually spelt Bryncrug in English, the community name uses the Welsh language version, Bryn-crug. The population of the community taken at the 2011 census was 622.

To the south west of the village stood Ynysymaengwyn, a mansion built in 1758 but now demolished. To the south stood Cynfal motte-and-bailey castle, built in 1137 by Cadwaladr ap Gruffydd, brother of Owain Gwynedd.

The poet David Richards (1751–1827), bardic name Dafydd Ionawr, was born at Glanyrafon near Bryncrug.

Mary Jones, famous for walking to Bala at the age of sixteen to buy a Bible, lived in the village when older, and was buried in the village after her death in 1864.

The football club, Tywyn & Bryncrug F.C. (Welsh language: Clwb Pêl-droed Tywyn a Bryncrug), play their home matches in the village.
