= River Dysynni =

River in Gwynedd, Wales flowing from Tal-y-llyn Lake to Cardigan Bay north of Tywyn

Coordinates: 52°36′30.4″N 4°7′27.3″W

River Dysynni Welsh: Afon Dysynni
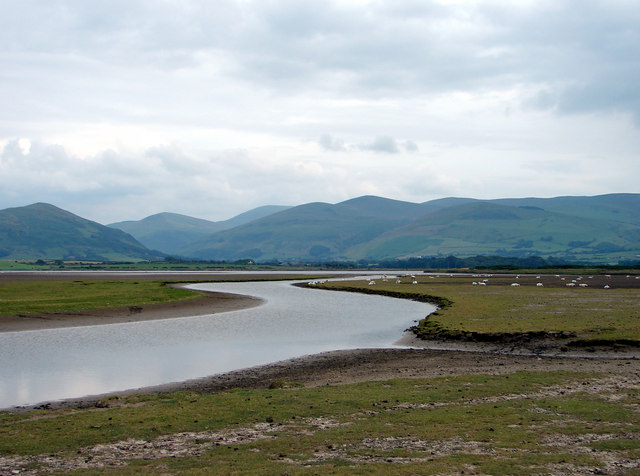
- Dysynni estuary

Location
- Country: Wales

Physical characteristics
- Source: Tal-y-llyn Lake
  - location: Wales
- Mouth
  - location: Irish Sea

The River Dysynni (Welsh: Afon Dysynni) is a river in mid Wales. Its source is the Tal-y-llyn Lake (Welsh: Llyn Mwyngil) just south of the Cadair Idris massif and its mouth is in the Cardigan Bay area of the Irish Sea to the north of Tywyn. It measures about 16 mi (26 km) in length.

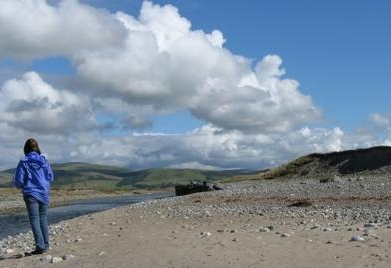
View to the south east from the estuary towards Broad Water lagoon

== Course ==
The River Dysynni flows from the western end of Tal-y-llyn Lake in a southwesterly direction to its confluence with the Nant Gwernol at Abergynolwyn. From here it flows in a northwesterly direction to its confluence with the Afon Cader, from where it resumes its southwesterly direction, meandering through a broad valley. It is joined here by its tributary, the Afon Fathew, which flows from near Dolgoch and joins it to the east of Tywyn, near Bryncrug. The river enters Cardigan Bay through the Broad Water lagoon to the north of Tywyn, near Tonfanau.

The river is interesting geologically because it exhibits river capture. This is likely to be as a result of river damming during a glacial period. The upper course of the river follows a fault line but at Abergynolwyn must have been blocked by a major landslide, the scar from which can still be seen on the side of the valley. The valley below here is blocked by debris on a rock base. The River Dysynni was thus forced to adopt a new course, and pushed its way through the hills northwestwards to find a new course in the parallel valley to the north.

== Walking ==
The Dysynni Valley is popular with walkers. It is a scenic valley, with the Cadair Idris massif to the north and the huge rock face of Craig yr Aderyn to the south. The valley contains the ruins of Castell y Bere near Llanfihangel-y-Pennant. There are several walking routes, one being a path from Bryncrug alongside the Afon Fathew to the Broad Water.

== Tributaries ==
- Nant Gwernol
- Afon Cader
- Afon Fathew
