= Afon Fathew =

River in Gwynedd, Wales

Coordinates: 52.6104°N 4.072°W

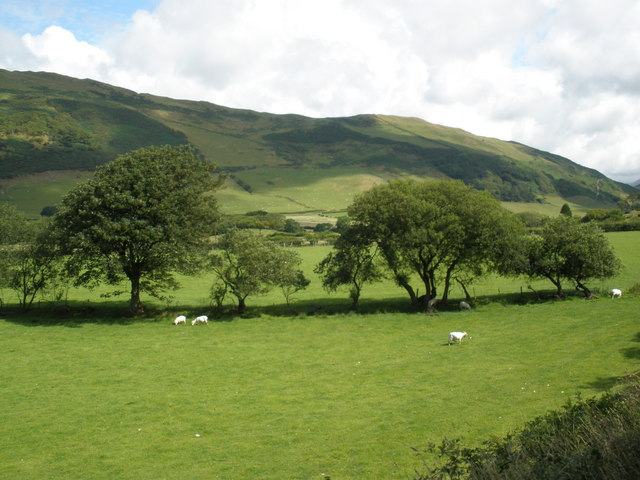
- View of the Afon Fathew valley

Location
- Country: Wales
- Region: Gwynedd

Physical characteristics
- Source
  - location: Gwynedd
- Mouth
  - location: River Dysynni
- Discharge
  - location: Dysynni

The Afon Fathew (English: River Mathew/Fathew) is a river in Gwynedd, north-west Wales. The river is downstream from the Dolgoch Falls which is a popular nature site, and is followed for much of its course by the Talyllyn Railway.

== Name ==
The basic name of the river in Welsh is Mathew, presumably in origin the personal name Matthew. Due to consonant mutation, Mathew becomes Fathew following the feminine noun afon ('river'). Likewise, the feminine noun pont ('bridge') gives rise to the name of the hamlet Pontfathew, now considered to be a part of the village of Bryn-crug. In English, the Welsh name Afon Fathew is commonly used, and River Mathew less so. The form River Fathew is also quite common, although it is difficult to justify on a linguistic basis as there is no consonant mutation in English.

== Course ==
The Afon Fathew is a short river and flows in a southwesterly direction from near Dolgoch railway station, joining the River Dysynni to the east of Tywyn near Bryncrug. The Talyllyn Railway runs beside the Afon Fathew for much of its course. The Dolgoch Falls are a series of three waterfalls on the Nant Dôl-goch stream, which is a tributary of the Afon Fathew, and are a popular destination for walkers from Dolgoch station.

The river valley is interesting geologically because it exhibits river capture. Above Dolgoch, the valley is occupied by the River Dysynni. During a glacial period, the valley was blocked by a major landslide at Abergynolwyn, the scar from which can still be seen on the side of the valley. The River Dysynni was thus forced to adopt a new course, and pushed its way through the hills northwestwards to find a new channel in the parallel valley to the north. The Afon Fathew is made up of the lower tributaries of the former Dysynni which continue to flow down a valley which is disproportionately large relative to the volume of water that flows through it.
