= Race the Train =

Cross country running event in Wales

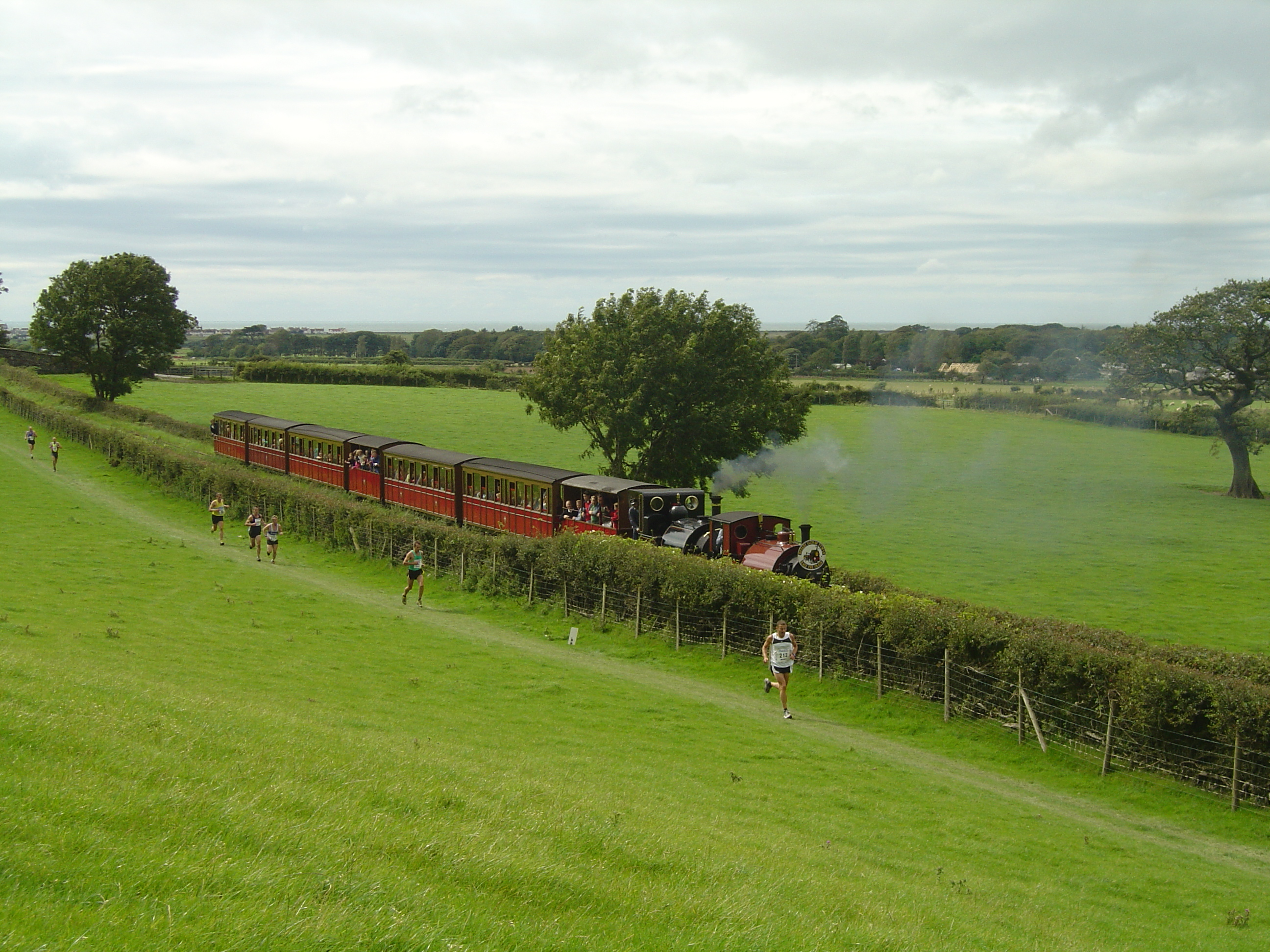
- Front runners racing the train in 2008
- Location: Tywyn, Wales
- Event type: cross-country
- Distance: 14 miles (23 km)
- Course records: 1 hour 18 minutes
- Website: www.racethetraintywyn.co.uk

Race the Train (Welsh: Râs y Tren) is an annual cross country running event that takes place in Tywyn, Mid Wales. The race is organised by Tywyn Rotary Club, and attracts runners from all over the world. In the main event, runners compete to beat a steam train on the preserved Talyllyn Railway over a distance of 14 miles (23 km). The event has featured both in local and national media, including the BBC's Countryfile programme.

== History ==
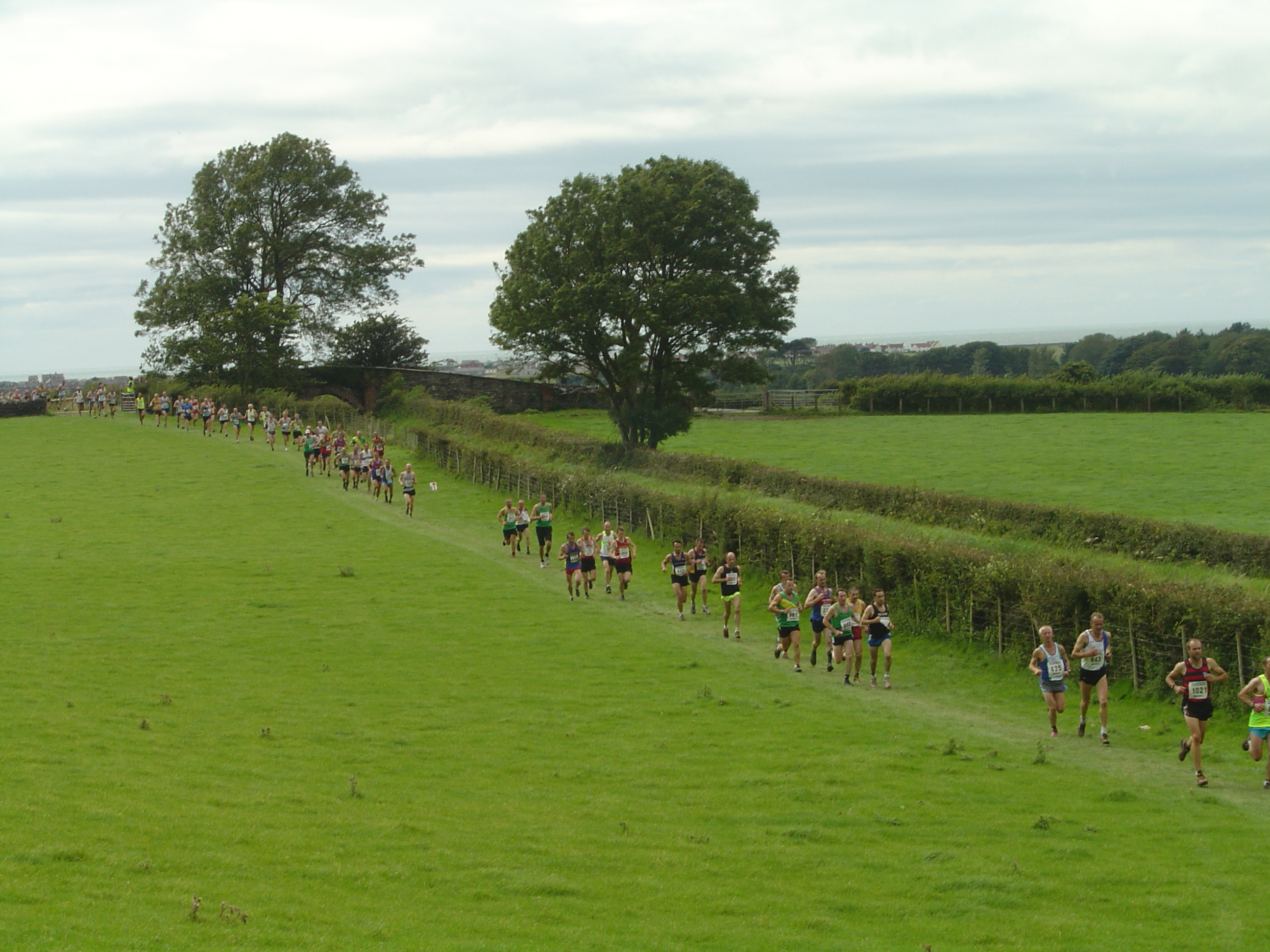
Part of the main pack chasing the train in 2008

The event was the idea of local dentist, Godfrey Worsey, and was first run in 1984 with around 48 runners. The following year, this had increased to 250 runners. In 2008, there were 822 runners in the main race; the winner completing the course in just over 1 hour 18 minutes, a course record.

== Route ==
A map of the Talyllyn Railway

The full race of 14 miles (23 km) is from Tywyn to Abergynolwyn and back. The course is mostly over public footpaths and local privately owned farmland, with the permission of the landowners, though the first and last sections are on public roads. Although only the elite runners stay ahead of the train for the full distance, the train stops in various locations to take on water, pass other trains or to run round at Abergynolwyn, allowing other runners to overtake.

Additionally, there are shorter races in the morning, as follows:

- Quarry Challenge - 6.2 miles (10.0 km) from Quarry Siding Halt to Tywyn.
- Dolgoch Challenge - 5.5 miles (8.9 km) from Dolgoch to Tywyn.
- Tynllwynhen Challenge - 3.5 miles (5.6 km) from Tynllwynhen Halt to Tywyn.
- Toddlers trot for children round the perimeter of the race field.

== Event under threat ==
In March 2009, it was announced that the August race could be the last, unless more volunteers could be found to help organise the event. Due to a strong response from the local community, these fears have been allayed and it was announced in the 2009 Race Programme, that the event's future was secured for a number of years.
