= Tal-y-llyn Lake =

Lake in Gwynedd, North Wales

- Welsh: Llyn Mwyngil
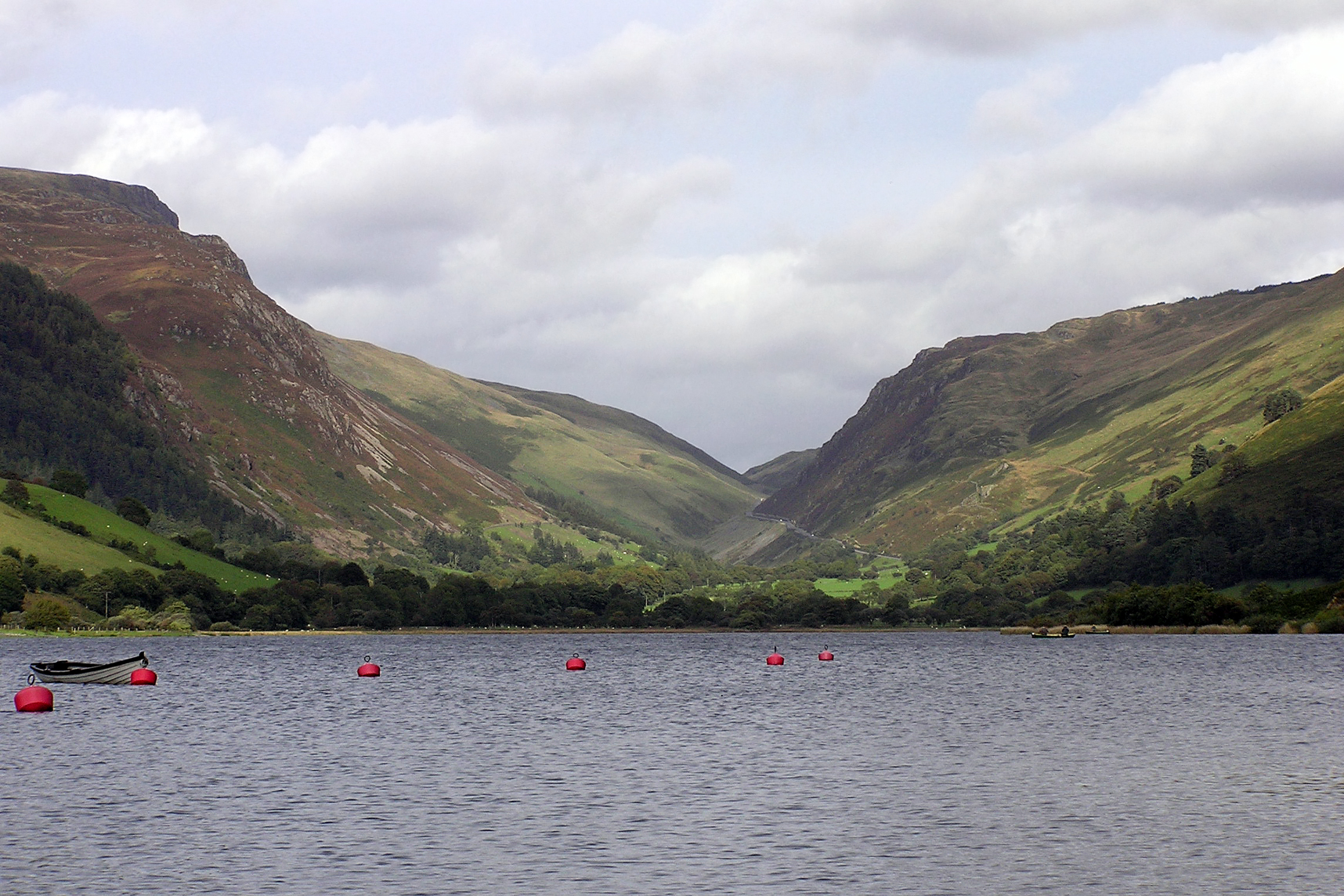
- Looking north-east up the Bwlch Llyn Bach pass

- Location within Gwynedd
- Location: North Wales
- Coordinates: 52.67250°N 3.89744°W
- Type: Natural Ribbon Lake
- Primary outflows: River Dysynni
- Basin countries: United Kingdom
- Surface area: 220 acres (89 ha)
- Average depth: 3 m (9.8 ft)

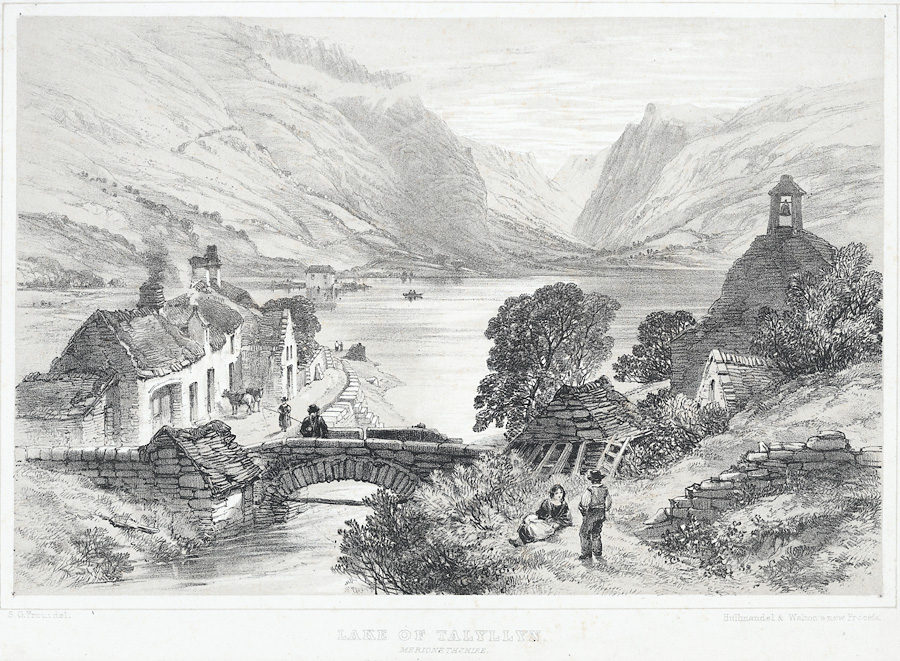
Black and white print of lithograph by Samuel Prout, 1783-1852

Tal-y-llyn Lake, (Welsh: Llyn Mwyngil), also known as Talyllyn Lake and Llyn Myngul, is a large glacial ribbon lake in Gwynedd, North Wales. It is formed by a post-glacial massive landslip damming up the lake within the glaciated valley. The hamlet of Talyllyn lies at the west end of the lake.

== Name ==
Tal-y-llyn Lake is named after the hamlet and historic parish of Tal-y-llyn. Tal-y-llyn itself is named after the lake and means 'the end of the lake' in Welsh. Literally, therefore, Tal-y-llyn Lake has the circular meaning of 'the lake at the end of the lake'. The Welsh name Llyn Myngul or Llyn Mwyngil probably derives from mŵn ('neck') and cul ('narrow').

== Geography ==
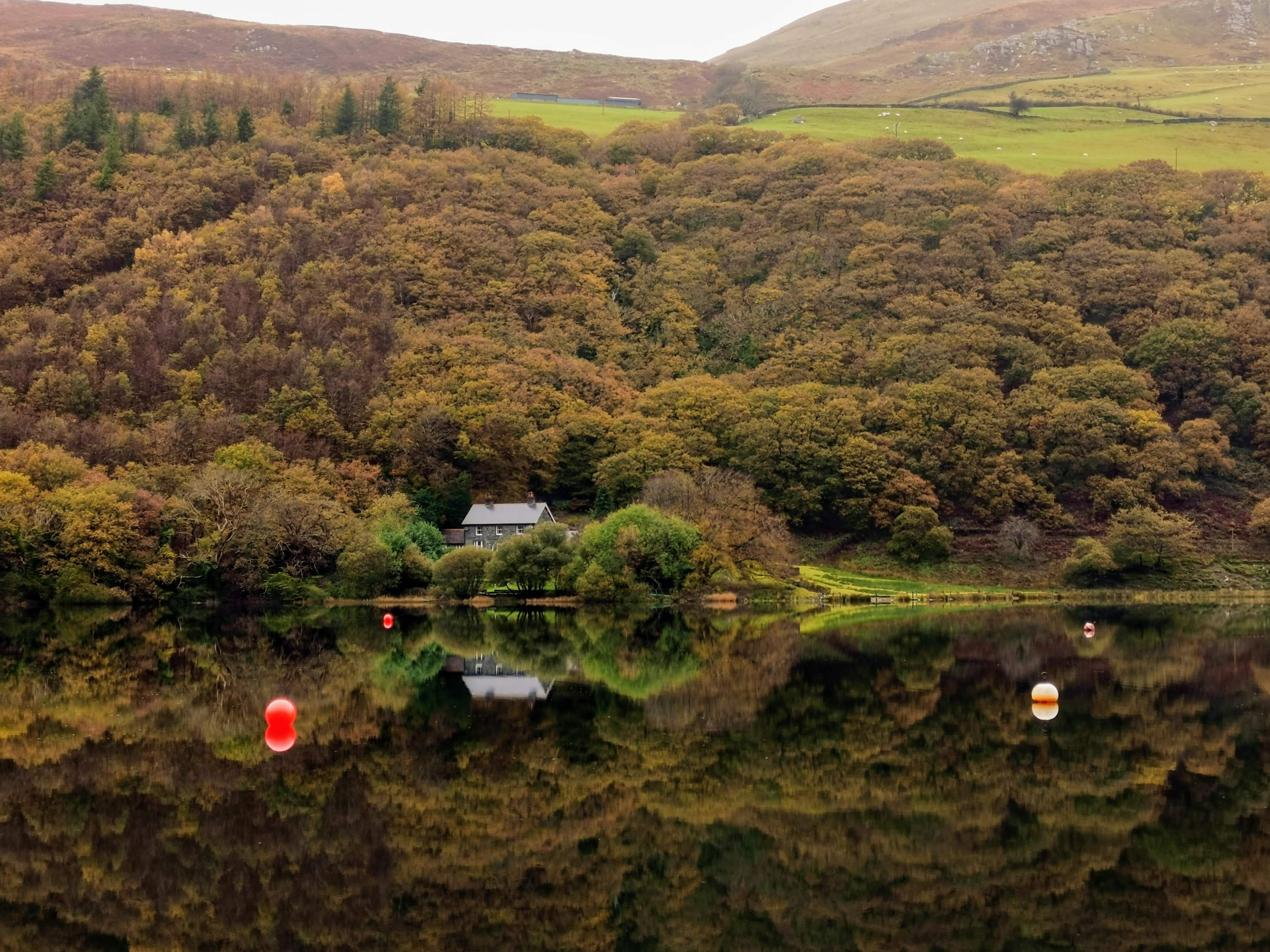
Tal-y-llyn Lake in Autumn

Tal-y-llyn Lake is situated to the north of Machynlleth, at the foot of Cadair Idris, in the Snowdonia mountain range of Gwynedd, Wales. The River Dysynni flows from the lake, through the village of Abergynolwyn, and discharges into the sea north of Tywyn.

There is a route leading to the summit of Cadair Idris from near the lake and the narrow gauge Talyllyn Railway has its eastern terminus at nearby Nant Gwernol near the village of Abergynolwyn, within the parish of Tal-y-llyn, the hamlet at the southern end of the lake.

== Geology ==
The Tal-y-llyn Lake is located on a major fault line in Wales known as the Bala Fault, which extends from the Cheshire border to Tywyn on the Cardigan Bay coast. The depression caused by this was likely carved out and deepened during subsequent glaciation periods. Until 1962, Tal-y-llyn Lake was regarded as the most southerly example of a lake formed in a rock basin, with a terminal moraine on top of the bedrock through which the river had carved a channel. It is now understood that what appeared to be bedrock is in fact massive blocks of debris left by a large landslide. An enormous scar on the valley side to the left of the foot of the lake shows the source of the landslide, and another landslide a few miles downstream caused the River Dysynni to divert into the adjoining valley to the north. The upper end of the lake is becoming shallower as a result of the deposition of alluvium.

== In fiction ==
The lake features, unnamed, in The Railway Series by Rev. W. Awdry and Christopher Awdry, and the village of Talyllyn features as Skarloey.

1976 Newbery Medal winner Susan Cooper used the lake as a setting for the book The Grey King. Within the lake six sleepers lie, wakened by Will Stanton playing the Harp of Gold. Afterward, they ride to the aid of the Light in the book Silver on the Tree.
