= Dolgoch Falls =

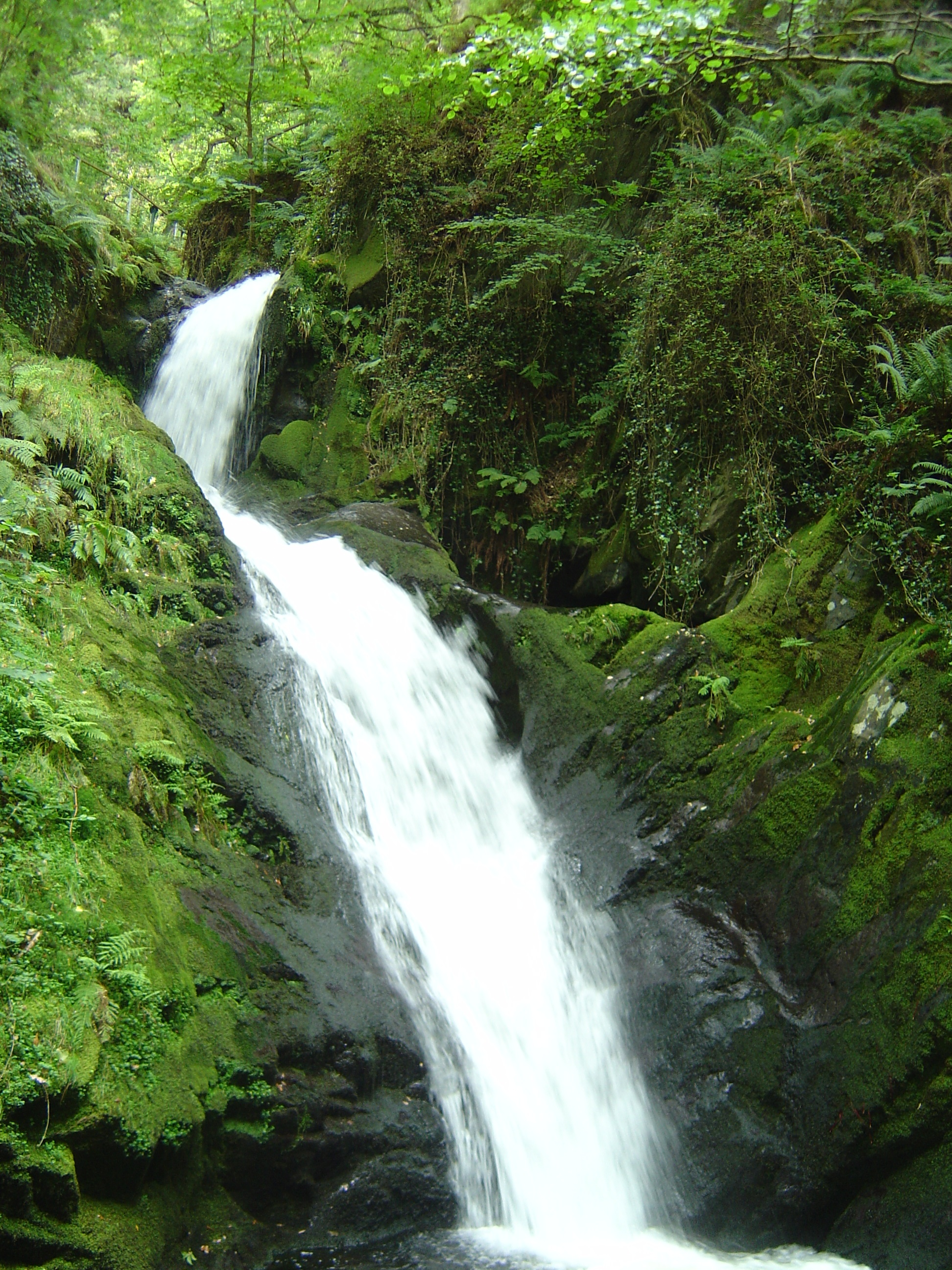
- The lower falls
- Interactive map of Dolgoch Falls
- Location: Gwynedd, Wales
- Coordinates: 52.6195°N 3.9915°W
- Number of drops: 3
- Watercourse: Nant Dôl-goch

The Dolgoch Falls (also known as the Dol-goch falls, or the Dôl-goch falls (English: 'red meadow falls') are a series of three waterfalls near Tywyn in Gwynedd, North Wales.

The falls are part of the stream called Nant Dôl-goch, which flows into the Afon Fathew. A popular walk from the nearby Dolgoch station on the Talyllyn Railway runs besides the falls. The Dolgoch slate quarry was dug into the west wall of the gorge of the falls.

== See also ==
- List of waterfalls
- List of waterfalls in Wales
