= Cliff Thomas (writer) =

British railway author and journalist

- Occupations: Writer, Journalist

Cliff Thomas is a British railway author and journalist, particularly known for his works on narrow-gauge railways.

== Biography ==
Thomas was a writer and editor of Railway World magazine. He has been a writer on the subjects of steam locomotives and heritage railways for The Railway Magazine since 2007. Thomas is Chairman of the Greensand Railway Museum Trust, a charity that restores historic rolling stock related to the sand quarrying industry. He is also a Director of the Leighton Buzzard Light Railway.

In 2016, Thomas sued writer and illustrator Pauline Hazelwood over a children's book about the steam locomotive "Alice". The case was settled before trial with the payment of a financial sum to Mr Thomas.

== Works ==
- Thomas, Cliff (25 August 1995). The Whipsnade and Umfolozi Railway and The Great Whipsnade Railway. The Oakwood Press. ISBN 0853614784.
- —— (27 August 2001). Quarry Hunslets of North Wales. The Oakwood Press. ISBN 0853615756.
- —— (May 2002). The Narrow Gauge in Britain and Ireland. Atlantic Transport Publishers. ISBN 1902827058.
- —— (June 2007). Railway Moods – The Ffestiniog Railway. Halsgrove. ISBN 978-1841146003.
