= Broad Vein Mudstone Formation =

Geological group in northwest/mid Wales

- Stratigraphic range: Hirnantian Age
- The Abercwmeiddaw quarry in Corris Uchaf which quarried the Broad Vein
- Type: Group
- Unit of: Abercorris Group
- Underlies: Narrow Vein Mudstone Formation
- Overlies: Nod Glas Formation

Lithology
- Primary: Mudstone
- Other: Slate

Location
- Coordinates: 52°39′48″N 3°50′43″W
- Region: Mid Wales
- Country: Wales

The Broad Vein Mudstone Formation (commonly known as the Broad Vein, historically known as the Red Vein and in Welsh as Y Faen Goch) is an Ordovician lithostratigraphic group (a sequence of rock strata) in Mid Wales. The rock of the formation is silty mudstone, intensely bioturbated in places. It varies in colour from a pale to a medium blue. This formation has been commercially quarried as slate in several locations along its length. The formation is between 400 metres (1,300 ft) and 560 metres (1,840 ft) thick and runs from Dinas Mawddwy south-west to Cardigan Bay at Tywyn.

== Outcrops ==
The formation is exposed in a number of locations in Mid Wales where glacial valleys cut across it. It is especially visible in the quarries along its length.

== Commercial quarrying ==
The Broad Vein is one of the two major slate veins in Mid Wales that were commercially quarried. Broad Vein rock is generally dense, with few natural joints, so most of the commercial use was for slab and products such as mantlepieces, cisterns and (later) electrical switchboards. Production of roofing slates was relatively rare in Broad Vein quarries.

The Broad Vein was quarried in the following locations:

- Bryn Eglwys where the Narrow Vein was also worked, connected to the Talyllyn Railway
- Abercwmeiddaw quarry, the most commercially successful of the quarries that only worked the Broad Vein. Connected to the Upper Corris Tramway
- Cambergi quarry in Cwm Hengae
- Aberllefenni Quarry which worked from the 14th. century until 2002. Also worked the Narrow Vein. Connected to the Corris Railway
- Ratgoed quarry, which mainly worked the Narrow Vein, connected to the Ratgoed Tramway
- Maes-y-gamfa quarry a smaller operation, connected to the Hendre-Ddu Tramway
- Minllyn quarry, near Dinas Mawddwy, connected to the Mawddwy Railway
