= Abercwmeiddaw quarry =

Former Welsh slate quarry

Abercwmeiddaw
- The upper pit of Abercwmeiddaw quarry in 2009

- Location in Gwynedd

Location
- Location: near Corris Uchaf, Merioneth, Wales, UK; 52.6632°N 3.8453°W grid reference SH6770445603

Production
- Products: Slate
- Type: Quarry

History
- Opened: 1840s
- Active: 1840s–February 1886; late 1890s–1905; 1911–1917; 1924–1938 (sporadically)
- Closed: 1938

The Abercwmeiddaw quarry was a slate quarry that operated between the 1840s and 1938. It was located at Corris Uchaf about 5 miles (8.0 km) north of Machynlleth, in Gwynedd, north-west Wales. The quarry was connected to the Corris Railway via the Upper Corris Tramway which carried its products to the Cambrian Railways at Machynlleth for distribution.

== History ==
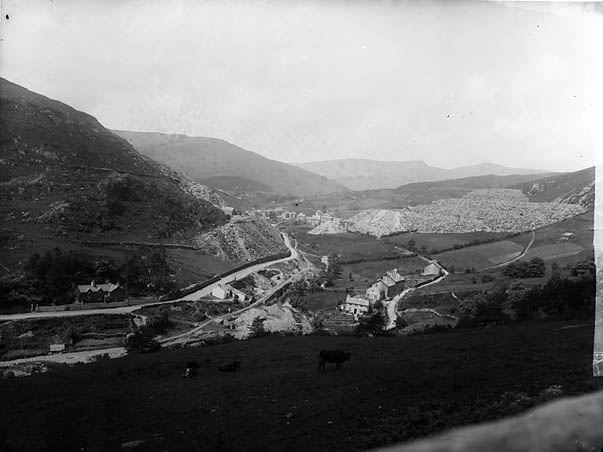
An 1885 view of Corris Uchaf from the east. The tips of Abercwmeiddaw are prominent on the right

Quarrying at Abercwmeiddaw probably started in the 1840s. Certainly it was a large enterprise when it was recorded employing 80 workers in 1849. In 1869, a lease was granted for the property and there is an 1871 report by John Imray on the quarry which describes a well-developed concern, although it was not then connected to the Upper Corris Tramway.

In 1876, the Abercwmeiddaw Slate Quarry Company was formed, with William Bright as the manager, and acquired the lease to the quarry. By March 1877, all the equipment for the new quarry was installed and a large number of men were being hired to work there. The company quickly established the quarry and by 1883 was producing 2,875 tons of finished slate.

The company was well capitalised, but struggled to make a profit. In 1885, they wrote to the manager of the Corris Railway asking for forgiveness on payment of an overdue bill. In February 1886, the quarry closed. In 1893, the quarry and its associated tramways and equipment were put up for sale. The quarry resumed production in the late 1890s. In 1899 it was closed for a month while a new steam engine was installed, and 200 men are recorded at work at the turn of the century. But the company struggled financially and was formally wound up in 1905.

In 1906, the quarry and its equipment was again put up for sale, and the equipment was sold to Maden McKnee of Liverpool. A new company, the Abercwmeiddaw Slate Quarry Company was formed in 1911, but did no better, being wound up in early 1917. The liquidator attempted to sell the quarry as a going concern after the end of the First World War. Between 1920 and 1923 the quarry changed hands several times, but was likely not working. Some quarrying took place in 1924, producing slabs for "cisterns, billiard tables and electrical switchboards", though details of the ownership were still in dispute. Sporadic working continued under the management of William Parry through the late 1920s and into the 1930s.

Braichgoch stopped using the Upper Corris Tramway in 1925 and the Corris Railway closed the tramway in 1927. After this, Abercwmeiddaw sent its output to Machynlleth by road lorry.

In 1935, a new company, the Abercwmeiddaw Slate and Slab Quarries Ltd. was formed to take over the quarry. The last known working at Abercwmeiddaw was in late 1938.

== Geology ==
The Abercwmeiddaw mudstone beds underlie the Rhiwlas Formation that runs through mid-Wales to Bala. In some locations these mudstones are highly cleaved, forming a vein of slate that is suitable for commercial quarrying. This slate vein is known locally as the Broad Vein or Y Faen Goch. Abercwmeiddaw was one of three main quarries to work the Broad Vein exclusively, the other two being Cambergi quarry near Aberllefenni and Maes-y-Gamfa quarry, west of Aberangell.

== Description ==
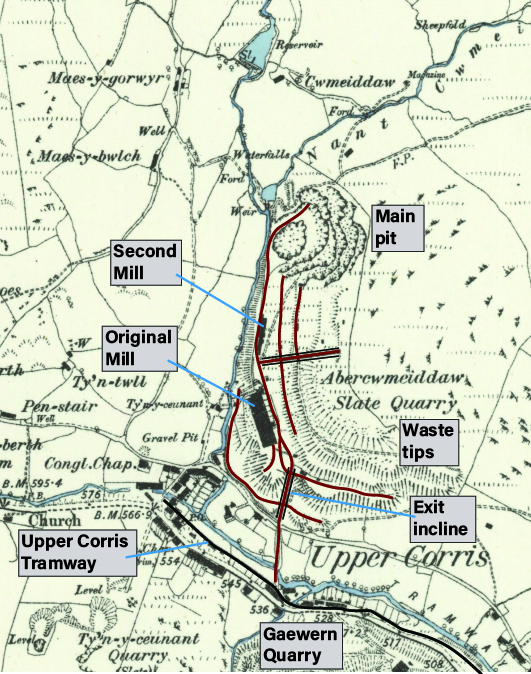
Map of the quarry in 1887

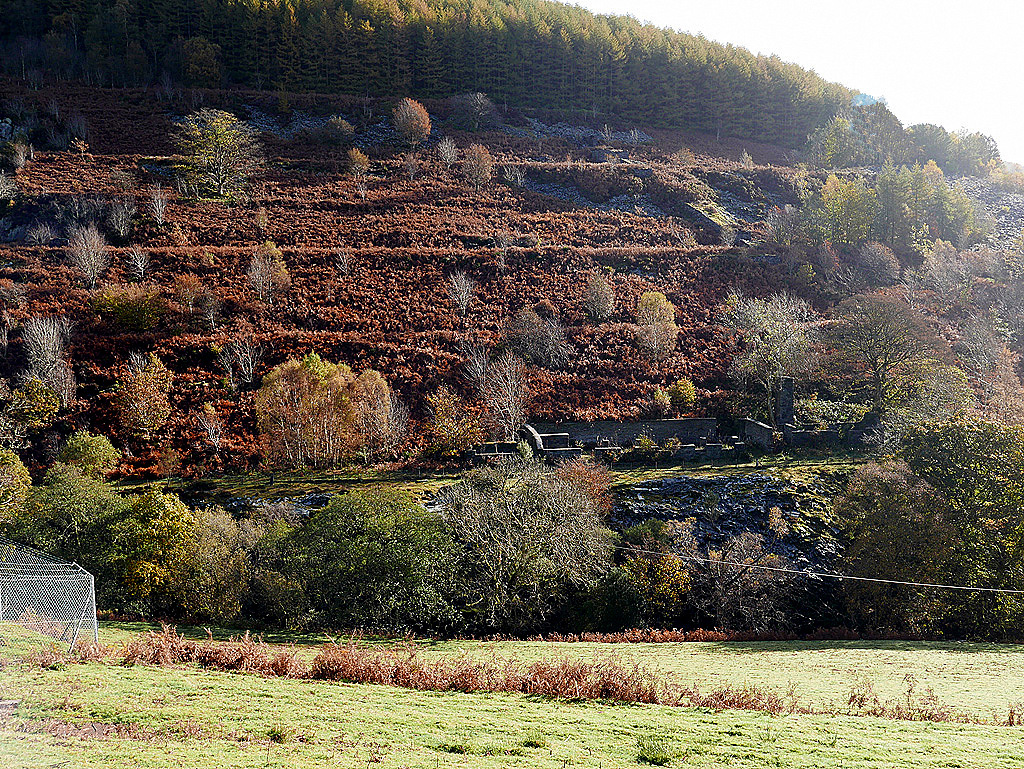
Abercwmeiddaw quarry in 2018, with the remains of the second mill at the bottom with the original incline above and behind it

The main working at Abercwmeiddaw was a large pit on the north of the site. The first workings here were underground, and the binocular tunnels were driven into the hillside to reach the Broad Vein. Later working was restricted to the open pit, though in the 1920s and 1930s underground extraction was resumed.

Before 1900, slate extracted from the pit was lowered down a long incline to the mill. As the pit deepened further tramways were constructed to connect to the incline, and eventually a locomotive-worked tramway at mill level was laid, and the incline was taken out of use. The pit descended below the level of the mill and a tunnel was bored from the bottom of the pit to a point below the mill. A short water-balance incline was used to lift blocks of slab up from this lower tramway to the mill level. This incline was later converted to run off the mill's waterwheel and then later still from a Robey & Co undertype steam engine. Tunnels were extended from the pit into the slate vein and extensive underground chambers were worked.

There were two mill buildings at the quarry. The original and larger mill stands to the south, above the Afon Deri. It had a 45 feet (14 m) diameter waterwheel that was sited 15 feet (4.6 m) below the mill level. This original mill is now demolished. The second mill is on the same level, but north of the original incline. It may never have been used as a mill, but the Robey steam engine was installed here and the chimney for engine was still standing in 2018.

The output of the quarry mill was taken out by an exit incline and a short tramway that crossed the Afon Deri and connected to the Upper Corris Tramway. High retaining walls were built on the north bank of the Afon Deri to hold back the waste tips on the narrow site. Abercwmeiddaw trains were gravity worked down the tramway to Maespoeth Junction. From there they were taken down the Corris Railway to Machynlleth station, where the company maintain a transshipment wharf. Here slates were stacked and later loaded onto Cambrian Railways trains. Up until 1879, the quarry worked its own empty trains up from Maespoeth. From then on, the Corris Railway provided the horses to haul the quarry's waggons.

=== Unusual features ===
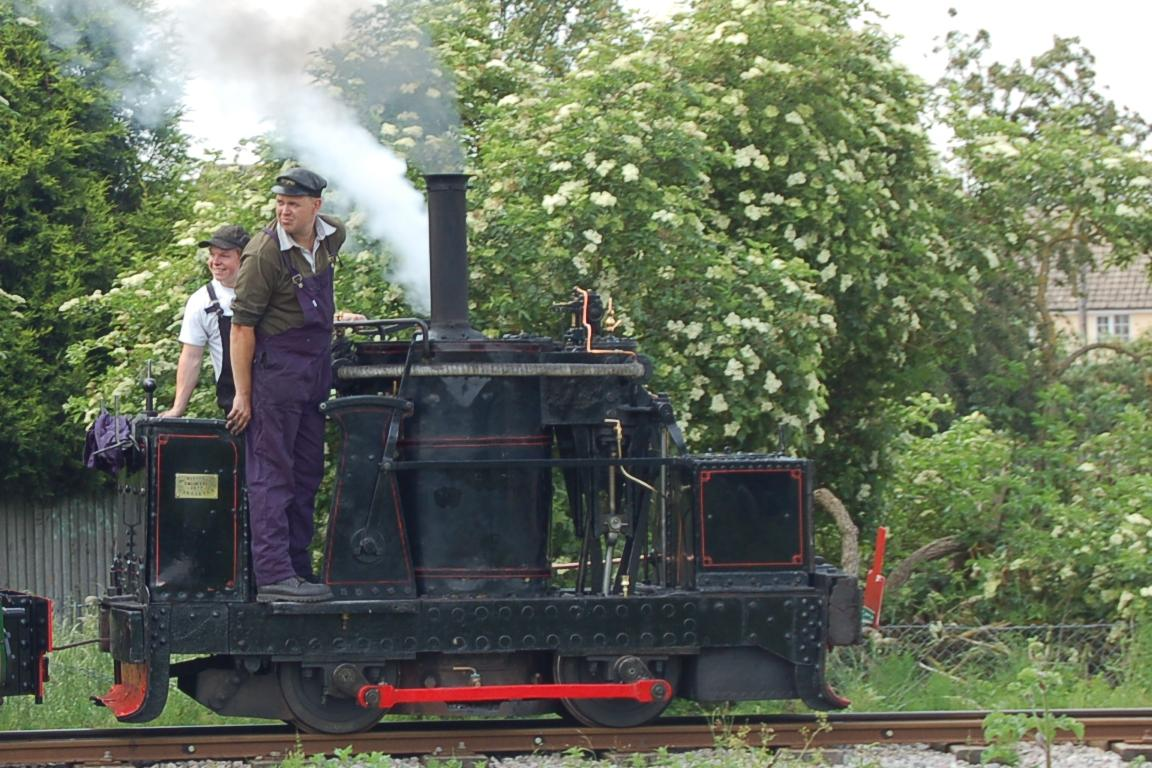
De Winton locomotive Chaloner, similar in design to the Abercwmeiddaw locomotive

The quarry had several notable features. In 1864, an experimental tunnelling machine was used to bore a binocular tunnel in the main pit. The tunnelling machine was thought to be supplied by John Dickinson Brunton the son of noted engineer William Brunton. The machine was powered by a remote steam engine, with transmission via a rope. It cut a circular hole in the rock, leaving a central core which was broken off and extracted to leave a circular tunnel. Two tunnels were driven, overlapping slightly, to produce a twin-bore tunnel whose profile resemble a binocular. These tunnels are now considered one of Wales' "scenic gems".

Uniquely amongst the quarries of the Corris area, Abercwmeiddaw used a steam locomotive to move rock on the tramways within the quarry. Braichgoch and Aberllefenni used internal combustion and battery-electric locomotives respectively, but Abercwmeiddaw was the only user of steam. It was described working in the quarry in 1877, and was advertised for sale in 1893 and 1906. The 1906 advertisement listed a "Locomotive engine with vertical multitubular boiler, 2 6in cylinders, four wheels coupled 2ft 3in gauge by H & J Ellis". It is likely the locomotive was a standard De Winton product that had been resold by Salford engineering company H & J Ellis. The locomotive had certainly been sold by 1920.

The third notable feature at Abercwmeiddaw was its use of Hunter saw tables in the mill. These machines were used to make regular cuts in large slate slabs and were invented by James Hunter, the son of James William Hunter. The Hunter saws were 13 feet (4.0 m) diameter circular saw driven from pulley shafts that ran along the length of the mill. Though circular saws were common in the Welsh slate industry, the Hunter variants were the first to have replaceable tips. Hunter patented his circular saw in 1855, and licensed their production to companies including De Winton.
