= Abercorris quarry =

Former slate quarry in Corris Uchaf, Wales

Abercorris
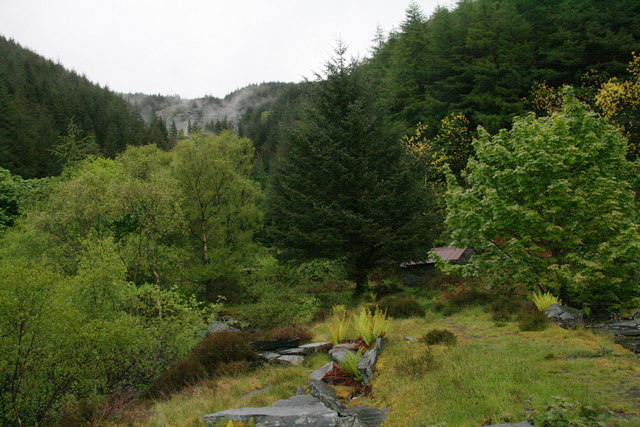
- The remains of Abercorris quarry in 2009

- Location in Gwynedd

Location
- Location: near Upper Corris, Merioneth, Wales, UK; 52.6632°N 3.8453°W grid reference SH 768 102

Production
- Products: Slate
- Type: Quarry

History
- Opened: mid 1840s
- Active: 1840s–1878; 1880–February 1887; June 1890–November 1891; 1893–1914; 1920–1928; sporadic working in 1930s & '50s
- Closed: early 1950s

The Abercorris quarry (also known as Cwmodyn quarry) was a slate quarry worked between the mid-1840s and the early 1950s. It was located at Corris Uchaf about 5 miles north of Machynlleth, in Gwynedd, north-west Wales. The quarry was connected to the Corris Railway via the Upper Corris Tramway which carried its products to the Cambrian Railways at Machynlleth for distribution. It worked the Narrow Vein.

== History ==
The 1841 census shows that at least one slate miner was boarding at Craig-y-Fachddu Farm, though he may have been working one of the other local quarries. Quarrying started on land owned by the farm in the mid 1840s, and the 1851 census shows quarry agent John Parry living in the farmhouse. By 1861, two quarrymen's cottage were recorded, and these were known to be part of the Abercorris quarry complex.

The land occupied by the Abercorris quarry was leased to Thomas Green of London in 1863, who began quarrying operations. In 1874 amidst a boom in demand for slate, the Cwmodyn Slate & Slab Quarry Company was formed, but demand slumped soon after and the company was sold at auction in 1878. Its new owner, J.W. Orchard began operations again by 1880 and in 1882 produce 4,173 tons of finished slate, worth £11,600 (equivalent of £1,206,503 in 2019). In 1883 a new company called the Abercorris Slate and Slab Company Limited was established, with J.W. Orchard as one of its directors. The company failed in 1886 and was wound up in February 1887. Later in 1887 the company was involved in the important legal case Levy vs Abercorris Slate and Slab Co (1887) 37 Ch D 260 over the legal meaning of a debenture.

A reconstituted Abercorris Slate & Slab Quarry Company was begun in June 1890, again led by J.W. Orchard, and it re-opened the quarry with 40 men employed. This attempt proved a dismal failure and the company was liquidated in November 1891. In 1893, W. John Lewis and Arthur T. Carr restarted the quarry under the name the Abercorris Slate Quarry Company. This operation continued with limited success, and after the turn of the century it began to struggle. In 1909, the owners reached agreement with the owners of the nearby Ratgoed and Cymerau quarries to combine their output and sell it through a single agent. But in 1910 they produced just 310 tons of finished slate. The quarry closed at the outbreak of the First World War. Following the war the quarry was reopened in 1920 under the ownership of T.O. Williams and C. Humphries. By 1928 this latest attempt had been wound up.

There was another small scale attempt to work Abercorris in the mid-1930s, and it was sporadically worked by the owners of Braichgoch quarry in the early 1950s, but this was the last time that slate was quarried as a commercial venture.
