= Narrow Vein Mudstone Formation =

Geological group in northwest Wales

- Stratigraphic range: Hirnantian
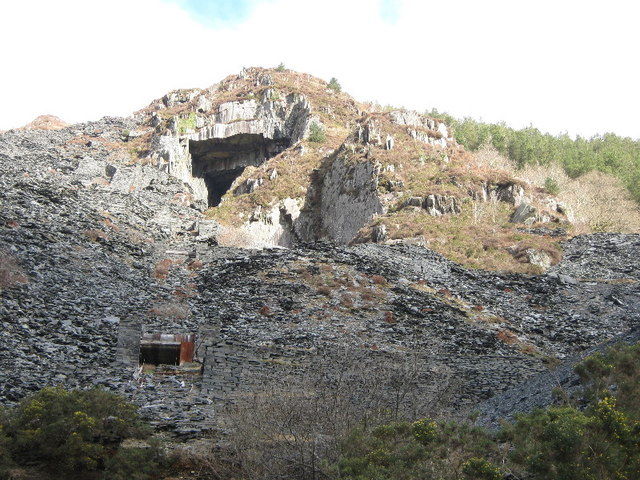
- The Aberllefenni Quarry showing the main working of the Narrow Vein
- Type: Group
- Unit of: Abercorris Group
- Underlies: Garnedd-Wen Formation
- Overlies: Broad Vein Mudstone Formation
- Thickness: 400 metres (1,300 ft) to 560 metres (1,840 ft)

Lithology
- Primary: Mudstone
- Other: Slate

Location
- Coordinates: 52°40′33″N 3°49′23″W
- Region: Mid Wales
- Country: Wales
- Extent: Dinas Mawddwy to Tywyn

The Narrow Vein Mudstone Formation (commonly known as the Narrow Vein) is an Ordovician lithostratigraphic group (a sequence of rock strata) in Mid Wales. The rock of the formation is silty, homogeneous or finely-laminated mudstone. It generally a medium blue colour. This formation has been commercially quarried as slate in several locations along its length. The formation is between 400 metres (1,300 ft) and 560 metres (1,840 ft) thick and runs from Dinas Mawddwy south-west to Cardigan Bay at Tywyn.

== Outcrops ==
The formation is exposed in a number of locations in Mid Wales where glacial valleys cut across it. It is especially visible in the quarries along its length

== Commercial quarrying ==
The Narrow Vein is one of the two major slate veins in Mid Wales that were commercially quarried. Narrow Vein rock is generally more splittable than Broad Vein rock and was often used to make roofing slates.

The Narrow Vein was quarried in the following locations:

- Bryn Eglwys where the Broad Vein was also worked, connected to the Talyllyn Railway
- Gaewern and Braichgoch quarries in Corris Uchaf, connected to the Upper Corris Tramway
- Aberllefenni Quarry which worked from the 14th. century until 2002. Also worked the Broad Vein. Connected to the Corris Railway
- Cymerau Quarry, connected to the Ratgoed Tramway
- Ratgoed quarry, which mainly worked the Narrow Vein, connected to the Ratgoed Tramway
- Hendre Ddu quarry a smaller operation connected to the Hendre-Ddu Tramway
- Gartheiniog quarry, also connected to the Hendre-Ddu Tramway
- Minllyn quarry connected to the Mawddwy Railway
