= Mynydd Hendre-ddu =

Coordinates: 52.69279861°N 3.77413743°W

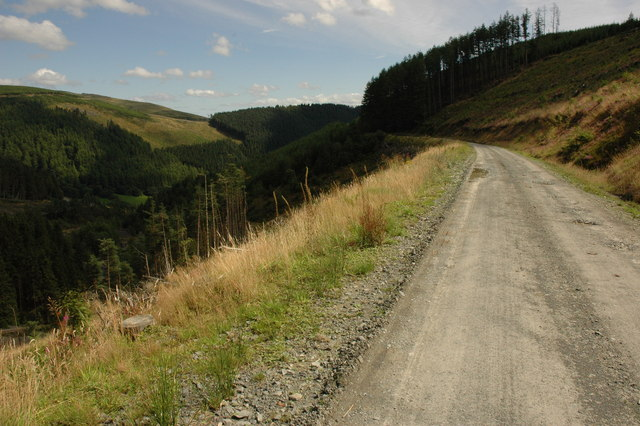
- Road on the flank of Mynydd Hendre-ddu

Highest point
- Elevation: 379.5 m (1,245 ft)
- Listing: Hendre-ddu mountain

Naming
- Language of name: Welsh

Geography
- Location: Gwynedd, UK
- Parent range: Snowdonia

Mynydd Hendre-ddu or Mynydd Hendreddu is a mountain in southern Snowdonia, Wales. It is one of a line of mountains running from Mynydd Dolgoed in the north, through Mynydd Llwydiarth to Mynydd Hendre-ddu and on to Mynydd y Foel, Y Grug, Mynydd Tri-Arglwyd and Mynydd Gwyn to the south of the village of Aberangell. It forms the watershed between Nant Llwydiarth, which flows to the south-west and into the Afon Dulas, and streams flowing into Afon Angell to the north, which flow east into the River Dyfi.

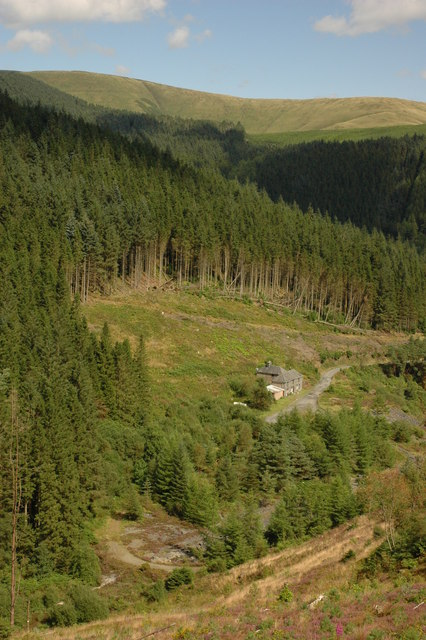
Hendre Ddu slate quarry, on the north slope of Mynydd Hendre-ddu

The summit is notable for a set of parallel ridges about 80 centimetres (31 in) across and 130 metres (430 ft) long that run across it.

On the northern slope of the mountain lay the Hendreddu quarry which was connected to Aberangell by the Hendre-Ddu Tramway.

Mynydd Hendre-ddu is one of the Dyfi hills.
