= Mynydd Ceiswyn =

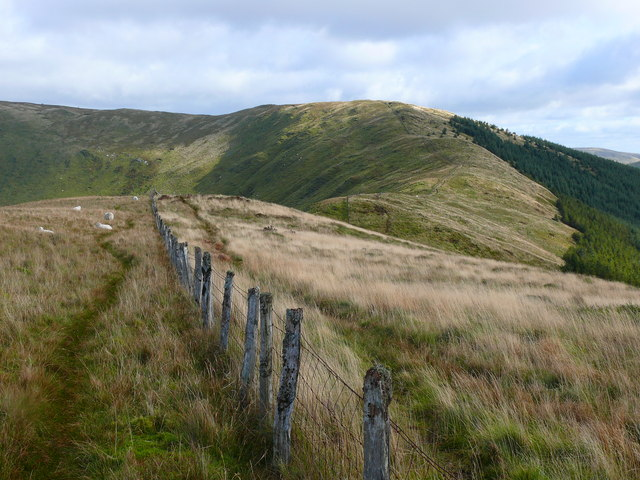
- The ridge of Mynydd Ceiswyn, looking towards Waen-oer

Highest point
- Elevation: 595.9 m (1,955 ft)
- Prominence: 27.4 m (90 ft)
- Listing: Hewitt (hill)
- Coordinates: 52.70890045°N 3.81845291°W

Naming
- Language of name: Welsh

Geography
- Location: Snowdonia, Wales
- Parent range: Cadair Idris
- OS grid: SH 7724 1390
- Topo map: OS Explorer OL23

Mynydd Ceiswyn is a mountain in Wales. It is the peak south of Waun-oer in the Dyfi Hills. On the east side of the mountain is the valley of the Nant Ceiswyn, and Cwm Hengae lies to the south.

Two minor dip faults cross the mountain, and the Ceiswyn Formation is named after this mountain.
