= Corris Craft Centre =

Craft and leisure complex in Wales

Coordinates: 52.6546°N 3.8505°W

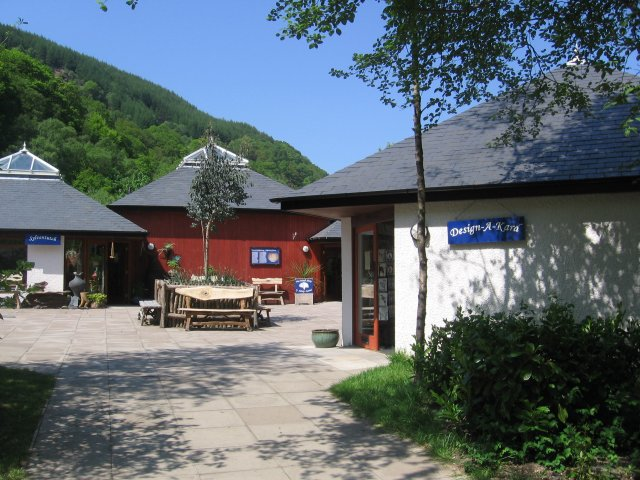
Units at the Corris Craft Centre

The entrance to King Arthur's Labyrinth

Corris Craft Centre is a craft and leisure complex in Corris, on the A487 near Machynlleth, mid-Wales. It is sometimes referred to as King Arthur's Labyrinth, one of the attractions on the site. Celebrating 40 years in 2022.

== The craft workshops ==
Winter opening:The Corris Cafe and Welsh Deli open daily 10am to 4pm. The Dyfi Distillery opens Wednesdays to Sundays 11am to 4pm and the Delyn Glass studio opens Wednesdays, Fridays and Saturdays 11am to 4pm. The Chocablock studio is taking bookings for Christmas chocolate making workshops. The Corris Craft Centre, which opened in 1982, comprises 9 workshops, with resident craftspeople:

- Quarry Pottery - Home of the Smoking Dragon
- Agau Jewellery Studio - Celtic and Contemporary Jewellery
- The Candle Studio - Dipped and Carved Candles
- Chocablock - Handmade Chocolates, Truffles and Fudge
- Delyn Glass - Flamework and Glass Sculptures
- Taran Eco Designs - Funky Rustic Forest Furniture
- Hyde and Sheep- Handmade Leather and Woolen Gifts
- Dyfi Distillery - Craft Gin with Wild Welsh Botanicals
- Sammi Wilson Art - Mixed Media Artwork and Photography

Some of the studios also offer hands-on sessions, for visitors to have a go at making their own crafts, such as painting pottery, making chocolates, and dipping candles.

== Braichgoch Slate Mine ==
Underground view of King Arthur's Labyrinth storytelling adventure

The centre is built on a landscaped part of the old Braichgoch Slate Mine, and the underground workings are used by three of the attractions at the Craft Centre:

- King Arthur's Labyrinth is a storytelling adventure, which visitors access by underground boats. At the end of the boat ride, visitors walk through the mine tunnels to caverns containing light shows retelling the tales of King Arthur and other ancient Welsh legends. The shop sells books, gifts and souvenirs on the Celtic Arthurian theme.
- Lost Legends of The Stone Circle is simple maze that includes elements of Arthurian myth. It is suitable for all ages and for wheelchair users.
- Corris Mine Explorers provides an opportunity to explore the abandoned workings of Braichgoch slate mine, which was worked from 1836 until the early 1970s. Equipment and discarded personal belongings remain untouched as relics of Welsh industry.

The Upper Corris Tramway, a 2 ft 3 in (686 mm) gauge horse-worked tramway connected the slate quarries around the villages of Corris and Corris Uchaf with the Corris Railway at Maespoeth Junction. It passed along the edge of the current site.

== Food and drink ==
The Craft Centre cafe serves a delicious all day menu where locally sourced fresh produce is used across the menu. As part of the centre's 30th Anniversary, a new Welsh food and drink shop was opened adjacent to the café, called The Welsh Deli

There is a children's play area, next to outdoor seating and picnic tables.

== Opening hours ==
All of the Craft Centre Studios open daily from Easter to November, although some are open all year round. Access to the site is free.

The Corris Café and Welsh Deli open daily from Easter to the end of October. Opening times vary at other times of the year.

Corris Mine Explorers is open all year round, although during particularly quiet times, trips may only run if there is sufficient demand.

King Arthur's Labyrinth and The Welsh Legends Maze open every day during the main season.

== See also ==
- Studio craft
- Braichgoch Slate Mine
- Slate industry in Wales
