= De Winton =

Engineering company in Caernarfon, Wales

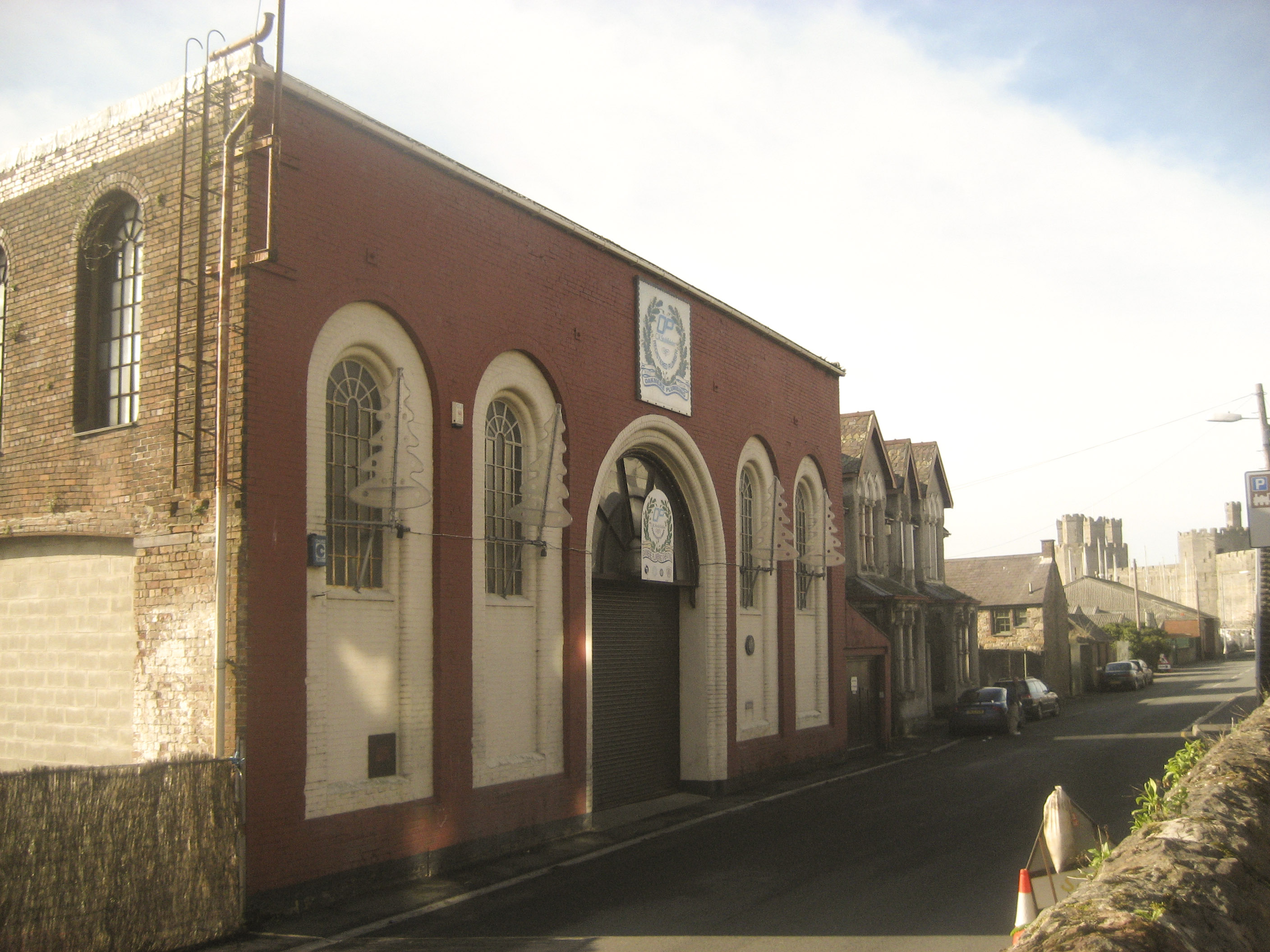
Part of De Winton's works on the quay at Caernarfon from the platform of the Welsh Highland Railway station

De Winton & Co (1854–1901) were engineers in Caernarfon, Wales. They built, amongst other things, vertical boilered narrow gauge locomotives for use in Welsh slate mines and other industrial settings. At least six De Winton locomotives have been preserved. But these quarry tramway locomotives, for which in the 21st century they are largely remembered, were just a small part of this company's engineering output.

== Overview ==
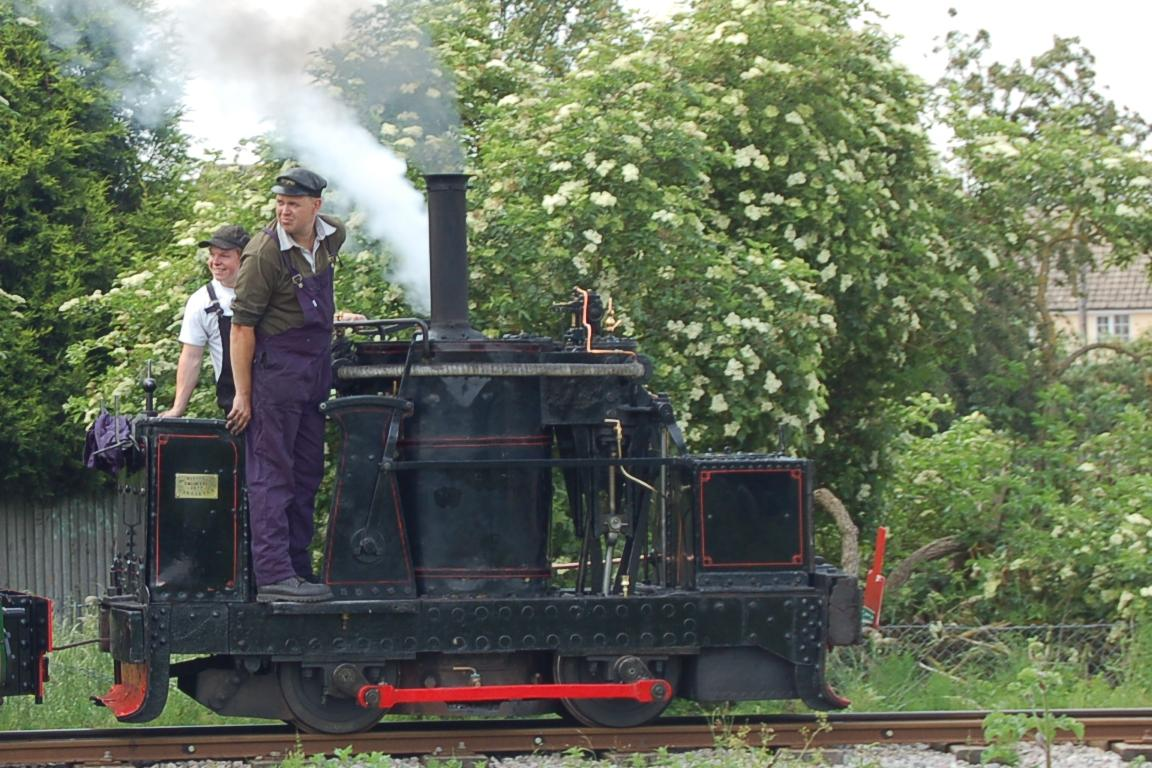
Chaloner, a De Winton locomotive resident at the Leighton Buzzard Light Railway

The company had its origins in a small foundry built on the slate wharf at Caernarfon by Owen Thomas in the 1840s. He subsequently went into partnership with Jeffreys Parry de Winton and the firm developed as the Union Foundry. Manufactures included street gaslight columns and all manner of street furniture. When the Carnarvonshire Railway was being built under Castle Square, the tunnel roof was supported by iron beams supplied by De Winton's and their name can still be seen at the entrance to the tunnel, which is now used as a road underpass.

The foundry was a major supplier to the Caernarfon and Liverpool ship building industry. The firm built marine steam engines up to 200 bhp powered by boilers that they also made. These marine engines influenced the quarry locomotives that they made. Over 60 were produced over a 25-year period. They also built stationary steam engines and the engine preserved at Parc Glynllifon near Caernarfon is the second oldest working stationary engine in Britain.

De Winton's supplied the quarry industry and made whatever might be needed. At the large and very profitable Dinorwic Quarry in Llanberis, in 1870, De Winton's built and equipped an entire workshop with machinery powered by overhead shafting that in its turn was driven by the largest water wheel in the United Kingdom (over 50 feet in diameter), which remained in daily use until 1925 when it was replaced by a Pelton wheel but retained as standby. The wheel is the subject of a preservation order but in fact the entire workshop complex is preserved as the National Slate Museum.

Jeffreys Parry de Winton (born Wilkins 1828–1892) was mayor of Caernarfon (1870–1872) when his company was one of the rising enterprises in the town. The Company remained in his hands and important in Caernarfon's maritime activities until about 1890. In its decline from that time it appears to have been badly managed and heavily committed to a French invention that failed and brought bankruptcy in 1901. Some of the De Winton works in St Helen's Road survives. Since 1988 it has been the home of a local plumbing and heating business; before that the foundry was used as a bonded warehouse and wine merchants. It stands opposite Caernarfon station of the Welsh Highland Railway.

The steam engine at Glynllifon was restored by Fred Dibnah after he was originally called to the park to quote for the demolition of the chimney.

== De Winton locomotives ==
The De Winton records were not preserved, so the complete list of locomotives produced is not known.

Type	Name	Worked at	Built	Gauge	Disposition	Notes
0-4-0VB	none	Abercwmeiddaw quarry?	1860s	2 ft 3 in (686 mm)?	Unknown	Very early locomotive, may have been supplied to agent H & J Ellis and sold on to Abercwmeiddaw quarry
0-4-0VB	Wellington	Dinorwic quarry	1877	1 ft 10 3/4 in (578 mm)	Sold to Glynrhonwy quarry 1898	Double-cylinder engine, double-flanged wheels
0-4-0VB	Harriet	Dinorwic quarry	1874	1 ft 10 3/4 in	Scrapped by 1895	Single-cylinder engine, double-flanged wheels
0-4-0VB	Peris	Dinorwic quarry	1875	1 ft 10 3/4 in	Sold or Scrapped by 1895	double-cylinder engine, double-flanged wheels
0-4-0VB	Victoria	Dinorwic quarry	1876	1 ft 10 3/4 in	Scrapped by 1895	Single-cylinder engine, double-flanged wheels
0-4-0VB	Padarn	Dinorwic quarry	unknown	1 ft 10 3/4 in	Sold to Glynrhonwy quarry 1898	Single-cylinder engine, double-flanged wheels
0-4-0VB	Rhymney	Pen y Bryn quarry	1875	2 ft (610 mm)	Scrapped	Built for Penrhyn quarry, but order was cancelled
0-4-0VB	Lord Penrhyn	Penrhyn quarry	1876	1 ft 10 3/4 in	Scrapped 1909	
0-4-0VB	Lady Penrhyn	Penrhyn quarry	1876	1 ft 10 3/4 in	Scrapped 1911	
0-4-0VB	Alice	Penrhyn quarry	1876	1 ft 10 3/4 in	Scrapped 1912	
0-4-0VB	Georgina	Penrhyn quarry	1876	1 ft 10 3/4 in	Damaged beyond repair in rockfall 1904	
0-4-0VB	Ina	Penrhyn quarry	1876	1 ft 10 3/4 in	Scrapped 1911	
0-4-0VB	Baladeulyn	Pen-yr-Orsedd Quarry tramways		2 ft	Sold to Glynrhonwy Slate Quarry in 1895	
0-4-0VB	Starstone	Pen-yr-Orsedd Quarry tramways		2 ft	.	
0-4-0VB	Inverlochy	Pen-yr-Orsedd Quarry tramways	1877	2 ft	Possible ex-Pen-y-Bryn Quarry. Scrapped 1937	
0-4-0VB	Glynllifon	Pen-yr-Orsedd Quarry tramways	1880	2 ft	Scrapped 1937	
0-4-0VB	Rhymney	Pen-yr-Orsedd Quarry tramways ex-Penybryn	1875	2 ft	Scrapped 1933	
0-4-0VB	Chaloner	Pen-yr-Orsedd Quarry tramways ex-Penybryn	1877	2 ft	Sold to Alfred Fisher in 1960. Now preserved at the Leighton Buzzard Light Railway.	
0-4-0VB	Kathleen	Penrhyn quarry	1877	1 ft 10 3/4 in	Stored at the Vale of Rheidol Railway Aberystwyth	
0-4-0VB	George Henry	Penrhyn quarry	1877	1 ft 10 3/4 in	Preserved at the Narrow Gauge Railway Museum, Tywyn	
0-4-0ST	Edward Sholto	Penrhyn Quarry Railway	1876	1 ft 10 3/4 in	Scrapped 1907	The only three horizontally-boilered locos known to have been built by de Wintons, all supplied to Penrhyn.
0-4-0ST	Hilda	Penrhyn Quarry Railway	1878	1 ft 10 3/4 in	Scrapped after 1911	The only three horizontally-boilered locos known to have been built by de Wintons, all supplied to Penrhyn.
0-4-0ST	Violet	Penrhyn Quarry Railway	1879	1 ft 10 3/4 in	Scrapped before 1911	The only three horizontally-boilered locos known to have been built by de Wintons, all supplied to Penrhyn.
0-4-0VB	Penmaen	Penmaenmawr & Welsh Granite Co. Ltd.	1878	3 ft (914 mm)	Out of use by 1943	Remains still in situ in quarry
0-4-0VB	Lillian	Penmaenmawr & Welsh Granite Co. Ltd.	1891	3 ft (914 mm)	Out of use by 1933; scrapped	
0-4-0VB	Louisa	Penmaenmawr & Welsh Granite Co. Ltd.	1892	3 ft (914 mm)	Out of use by 1936; scrapped 1951	
0-4-0VB	Ada	Penmaenmawr & Welsh Granite Co. Ltd.	1892	3 ft (914 mm)	Out of use by 1931; scrapped	
0-4-0VB	Gelli	Pen-yr-Orsedd Quarry tramways	1893	2 ft	Withdrawn 1945, still intact at quarry 1952; believed scrapped, frame used as part of pit in loco shed. Subsequently removed for preservation.	
0-4-0VB	Puffin	Penmaenmawr & Welsh Granite Co. Ltd.	1893	3 ft (914 mm)	Out of use by 1934	
0-4-0VB	Watkin	Penmaenmawr & Welsh Granite Co. Ltd.	1893	3 ft (914 mm)	Out of use by 1944. Purchased in 1966 by Mr. Evan Hughes of Llanrwst and loaned to the National Trust at Penrhyn Castle by Mrs. D. Williams in May 1972. Loaned to the Welsh Highland Railway for display at Caernarfon railway station in April 2019	
0-4-0VB	Harold	Penmaenmawr & Welsh Granite Co. Ltd.	1894	3 ft (914 mm)	Out of use by 1936; scrapped 1951	
0-4-0VB	Pendyffryn	Pen-yr-orsedd slate quarry	1894	1 ft 11 1/2 in (597 mm)	Privately owned; awaiting restoration at the Brecon Mountain Railway	
0-4-0VB	Llanfair	Penmaenmawr & Welsh Granite Co. Ltd.	1895	3 ft (914 mm)	Out of use by 1940	At the Welsh Highland Railway
0-4-0VB	Arthur	Pen-yr-Orsedd Quarry tramways	1895	2 ft	Scrapped 1956	
0-4-0VB	Victoria	Pen-yr-Orsedd Quarry tramways	1897	2 ft	Scrapped 1956	
