= Afon Deri =

River in Mid Wales

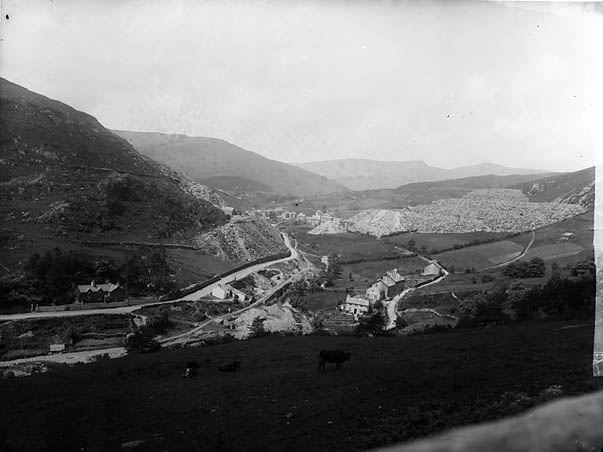
- The lower reaches of the Afon Deri around 1885

Location
- Country: Wales

Physical characteristics
- Source: Mynydd Ty-glas
  - elevation: 1,500 ft (460 m)
- Mouth
  - location: Corris
  - coordinates: 52°39′12″N 3°50′20″W
  - elevation: 280 ft (85 m)

The Afon Deri (sometimes known as the Afon Corris) is a river in Mid Wales. It flows from the eastern flank of Mynydd Ty-Glas down to Corris, where it joins the Afon Dulas that flows south to the Afon Dyfi.

The river passes through the village of Corris Uchaf and its lower reaches pass through the richest area of slate quarrying in Mid Wales. The Braichgoch, Abercorris and Abercwmeiddaw quarries are to be found beside the Afon Deri.
