= Afon Cerist =

River in Wales

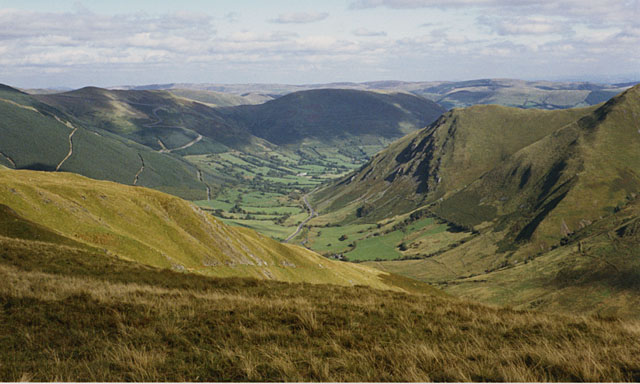
- The valley of the Afon Cerist seen from Cribin Fawr

Location
- Country: Wales

Physical characteristics
- Source: Maesglase
  - elevation: 1,419 ft (433 m)
- Mouth
  - location: Dinas Mawddwy
  - coordinates: 52°43′14″N 3°41′15″W
- Length: 4.7 mi (7.6 km)

The Afon Cerist is a small river that flows from underneath Craig Portas, the cliffs on the north side of Maesglase mountain, to meet the River Dyfi at Dinas Mawddwy. It forms the northern border of the Dyfi Hills.
