= Cambergi quarry =

Former slate quarry in Wales

Cambergi
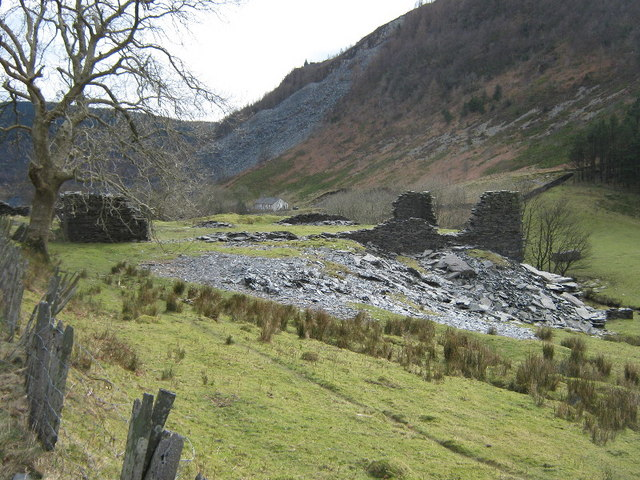
- The remains of the Cambergi mill in 2009

- Location in Gwynedd

Location
- Location: near Aberllefenni, Merioneth (now Gwynedd), Wales, UK; 52.679884°N 3.828500°W SH 76538 10697

Production
- Products: Slate
- Type: Quarry

History
- Opened: 1873
- Active: 1873–1879; 1880–c.1898
- Closed: c.1898

Cambergi quarry (also known as Wenallt quarry) was a slate quarry in Cwm Hengae, west of Aberllefenni in North Wales. It operated between 1873 and about 1895.

== History ==
The Cambergi Slate Company Limited was formed in 1873 to work the quarry, with a 10,000 £20 shares offered to the public. It took them company two years to construct the mill, the incline and start the quarry. They proposed that a branch of the Corris Railway was built along Cwm Hengae to the Cambergi mill, but construction of this did not begin. Instead the output of the mill was carted to the Corris Railway, either to the tramway at the Aberllefenni quarry, or all the way to Aberllefenni station.

The substantial construction costs bankrupted the original company, who only operated the quarry for a few months in 1875. The lease was taken over by the Griffiths family. Griffith Williams Griffiths who had been working a small quarry at the top of Cwm Hengae for nearly a decade, took over Cambergi. However, the slate was poor quality, and in 1877 he began work on Hengae quarry on the opposite side of the valley.

In 1879, Cambergi was one of several local quarries to shut down in response a fall in the price of slate. By 1880 the quarry had re-opened. Griffiths continued to work Cambergi, but by 1883 he was trying to sell up. He did not find a buyer and instead took a loan from The North and South Wales Bank to continue working. In 1887, the bank was pressuring him to repay his debts. In 1889, the quarry lent its mill to house the local Eistedfodd, but Griffiths continued to struggle financially. He tried to sell the quarry again in 1896, but again the potential buyer declined. Instead he renewed the lease and continued working. After one more attempt to sell Cambergi in 1897, Griffiths finally gave up just before the turn of the century. The quarry is shown as disused on the 1900 Ordnance Survey map.

The quarry remained in the Griffiths family, and in 1920 Griffith William's grandson attempted once more the sell Cambergi, this time along with Hengae and over 1000 acres of land in the valley. As before, he could not find a buyer.

== Description ==
The main quarry site was an open pit high near the summit of Mynydd Cambergi, about 800 feet (240 m) above the floor of the valley. There were 7 levels of terraces running into the pit, and significant waste tips below the terraces. A long and steep 4-pitch incline ran down to the road at the bottom of the valley. There were several small mills on the terraces.

At the foot of the incline, on the south side of the road, was a slate-built mill, containing nine saw tables and a slate planer. The mill was unusual in its use of shafts that ran beneath the working floor of the mill. This was due to the mill's placement above the level of the river that drove the waterwheel. The quarry dammed the Afon Llefenni upstream of the quarry, near Hengae House to power the waterwheel. In October 1896, the dam burst and flooded many homes in Aberllefenni, though it was later rebuilt to serve the main Aberllefenni quarry.

The quarry worked the Broad Vein that was also quarried at Abercwmeiddaw and Maes-y-Gamfa.
