= Nant Ceiswyn =

River in Mid Wales

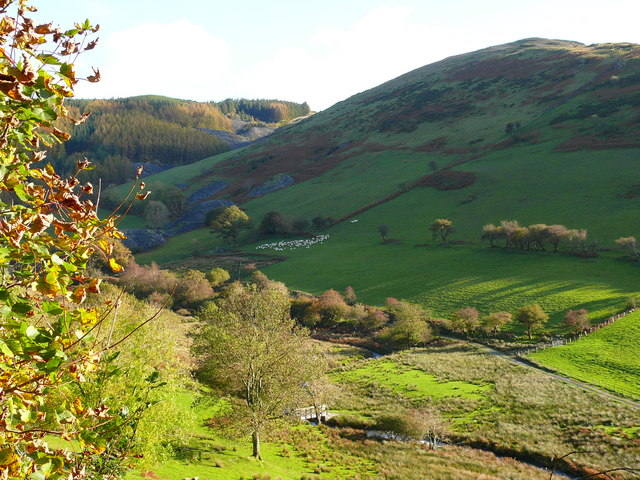
- The Nant Ceiswyn flowing along Cwm Ratgoed

Location
- Country: Wales

Physical characteristics
- Source: Mynydd Dolgoed
  - elevation: 1,900 ft (580 m)
- Mouth
  - location: Pont Cymerau, Aberllefenni
  - coordinates: 52°40′40″N 3°48′30″W

The Nant Ceiswyn (sometimes known as the Afon Ceiswyn) is a small river in Mid Wales. It flows from the northern flank of Mynydd Dolgoed down to Pont Cymerau, north-east of Aberllefenni. Here it joins the Nant Llwydiarth to form the Afon Dulas that flows south to the Afon Dyfi. There was an ancient bridge at Pont Cymerau.

The valley of the river is often known as Cwm Ratgoed (or Ralltgoed), after the Ratgoed slate quarry about two miles north of Pont Cymerau. The quarry was connected to the Corris Railway at Aberllefenni by the horse-worked Ratgoed Tramway, which crossed the river as it passes Cymerau Quarry.

To the east of the valley is Mynydd Ceiswyn, part of the chain of ridges running southwards from Maesglase.

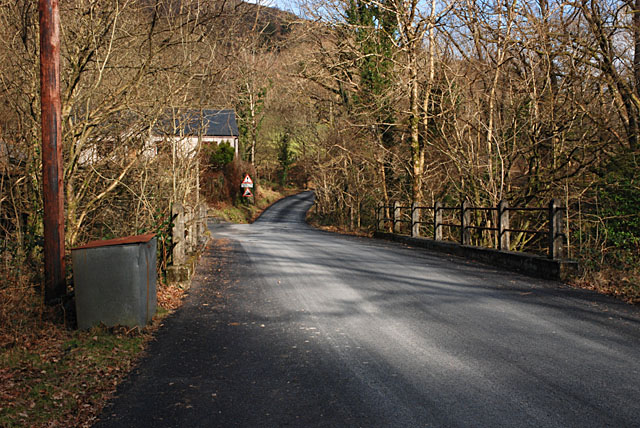
The bridge over Nant Ceiswyn at Pont Cymerau. This bridge was built in the 1930s
