= Mynydd Cambergi =

Mountain in Snowdonia, Wales

Coordinates: 52.6836°N 3.8239°W

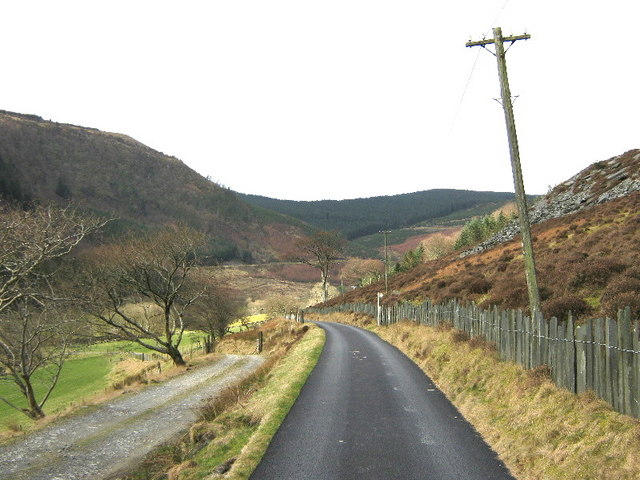
- Looking west along Cwm Hengae, with the lower slopes of Mynydd Cambergi on the right

Highest point
- Elevation: 449 m (1,473 ft)

Naming
- Language of name: Welsh

Geography
- Location: Gwynedd, UK
- Parent range: Snowdonia
- OS grid: SH 767111

Mynydd Cambergi or Mynydd Cam-bergi is a mountain in southern Snowdonia, Wales. It is a summit on a long ridge between Mynydd y Waun to the north and Foel Grochan to the east. The mountain forms the north-east side of Cwm Hengae and sits about 0.5 miles (0.80 km) west of the village of Aberangell.

Near the summit of the mountain lies the open pit of Cambergi quarry, which was worked from the 1870s to the 1890s.
