= Cribin Fawr =

Mountain in Snowdonia, North Wales

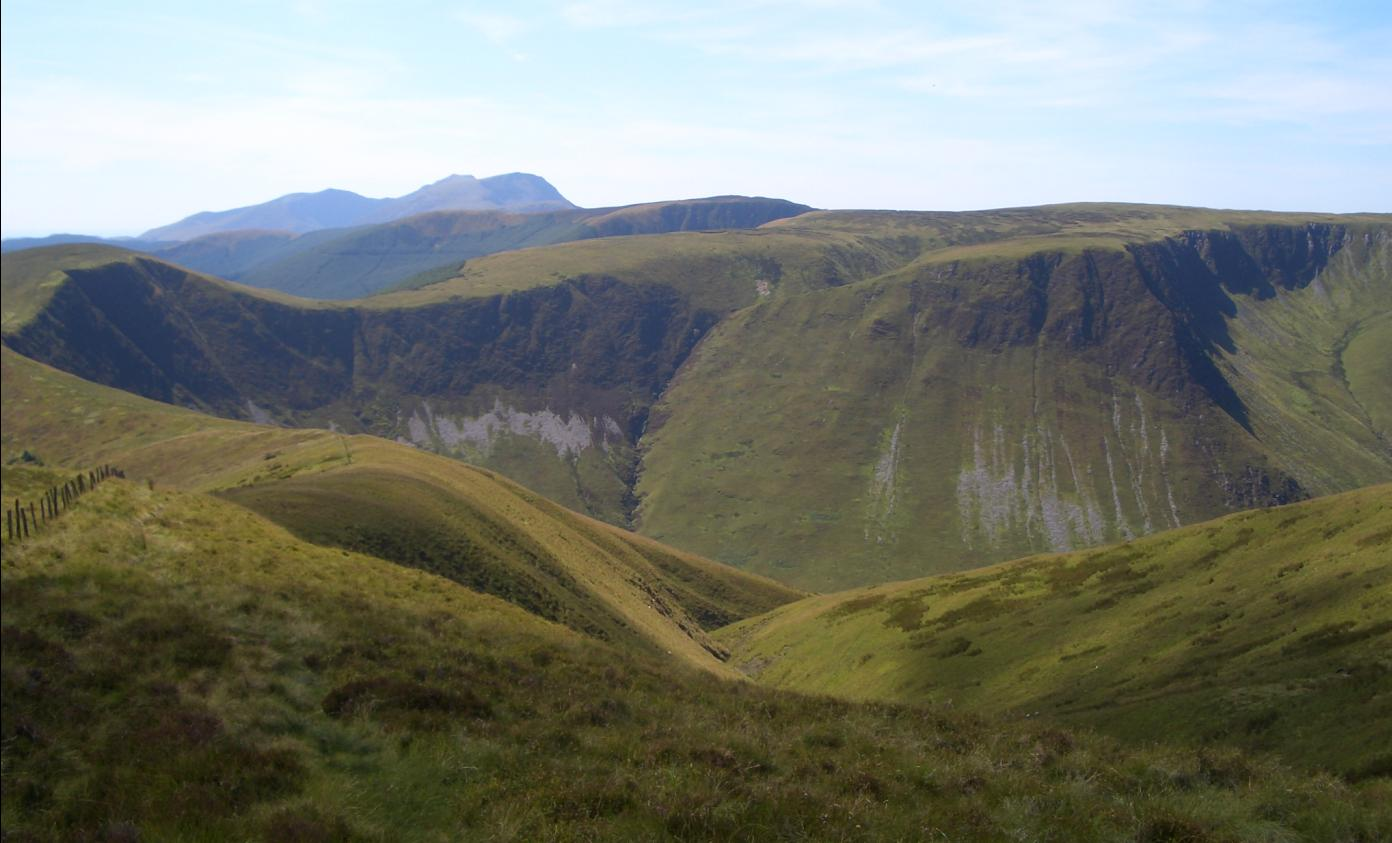
- Cribin Fawr from Maesglase, with Craig Portas to the left

Highest point
- Elevation: 659 m (2,162 ft)
- Prominence: 93 m (305 ft)
- Listing: Hewitt, Nuttall, sub-HuMP
- Coordinates: 52.7221°N 3.7855°W

Naming
- Language of name: Welsh

Geography
- Location: Snowdonia, Wales
- Parent range: Cadair Idris
- OS grid: SH817150
- Topo map: OS Explorer OL23

Cribin Fawr is a mountain in Snowdonia, North Wales, situated approximately four miles to the south-west of Aran Fawddwy. It is one of the peaks in the Dyfi hills, a subgroup of the Cadair Idris group. It is a top of Maesglase, connected to its parent peak by the Craig Portas ridge. The top of Cribin Fawr is a large open plateau of peat bog. To the west is Waun-oer, to the north Cadair Idris, to the south Maesglase and Glasgwm to the east.
