= Maesglase =

678m high mountain in Wales

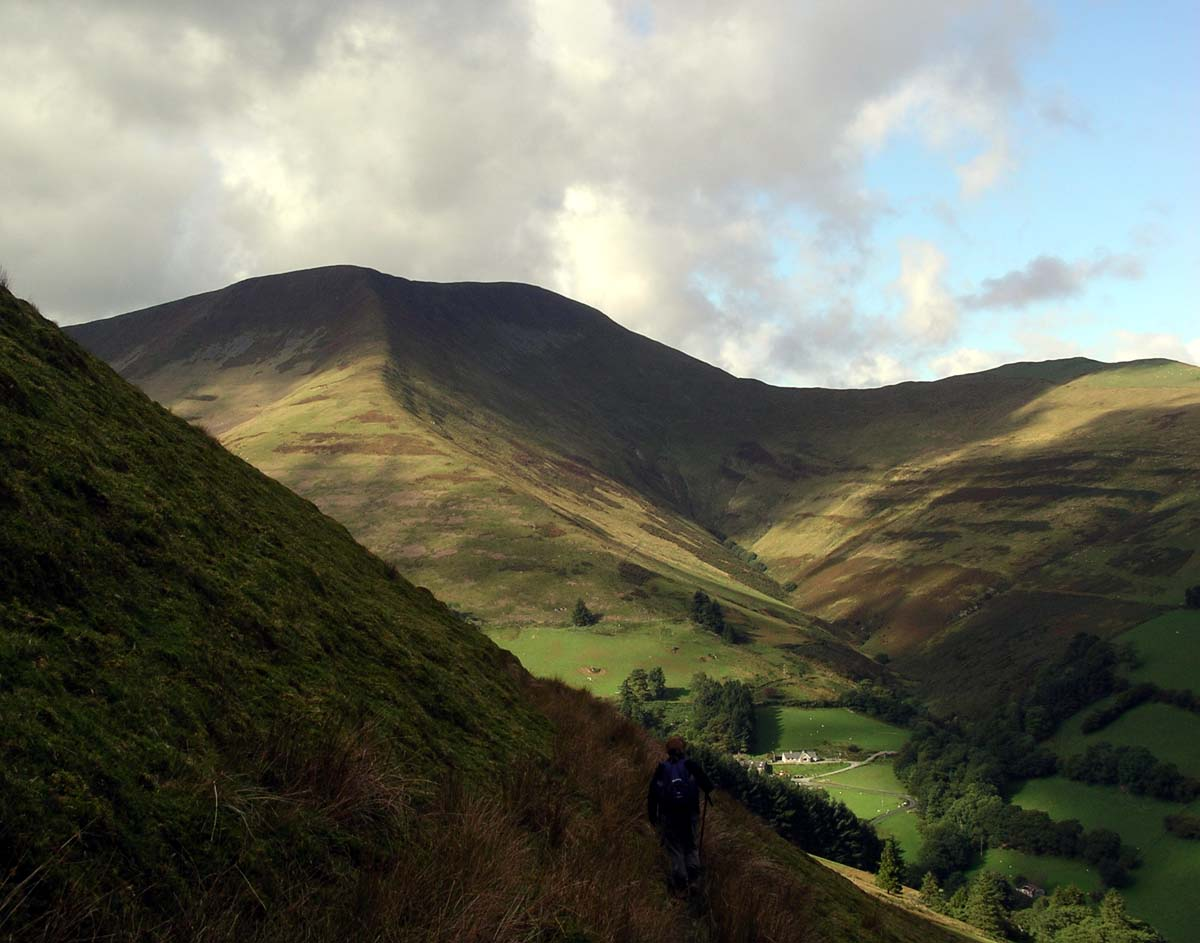

Highest point
- Elevation: 678.5 m (2,226 ft)
- Prominence: 318 m (1,043 ft)
- Listing: Marilyn, Hewitt, Nuttall
- Coordinates: 52.720°N 3.753°W

Naming
- English translation: blue/green field
- Language of name: Welsh
- Pronunciation: Welsh: [mai̯sˈɡlasɛ]

Geography
- Location: Snowdonia, Wales
- Parent range: Cadair Idris
- OS grid: SH817150
- Topo map: OS Explorer OL23

Listed summits of Maesglase
Name	Grid ref	Height	Status
Waun-oer		670 metres (2,198 ft)	Hewitt, Nuttall
Cribin Fawr		659 metres (2,162 ft)	Hewitt, Nuttall
Mynydd Dolgoed		605 metres (1,985 ft)	sub Hewitt

Maesglase is a mountain in Snowdonia, North Wales, situated approximately four miles to the south-west of Aran Fawddwy. It is the highest of the Dyfi Hills.

It can be reached by an easy but steep walk through the forestry from Dinas Mawddwy or directly from the bwlch on the A470. Ascending Maesglase provides an opportunity to climb several other nearby peaks including Maen-Du, Craig Rhiw-erch, Waun-oer, Mynydd Dolgoed and Cribin Fawr which are linked by a series of ridges and arêtes.

The precise location of the summit is the subject of some confusion. Traditionally, the top of Maen Du (674 metres (2,211 ft) at SH823152) was regarded as Maesglase's summit. However, more recent surveys suggest that the top of Craig Rhiw-erch (c 676 metres (2,218 ft) at SH817150, some 600 metres (2,000 ft) to the west) is higher. A recent survey puts it at 678.5 metres (2,226 ft). The geomorphology of these mountains is classical U-shaped glacial valleys with textbook examples of hanging valleys and intersecting valleys.

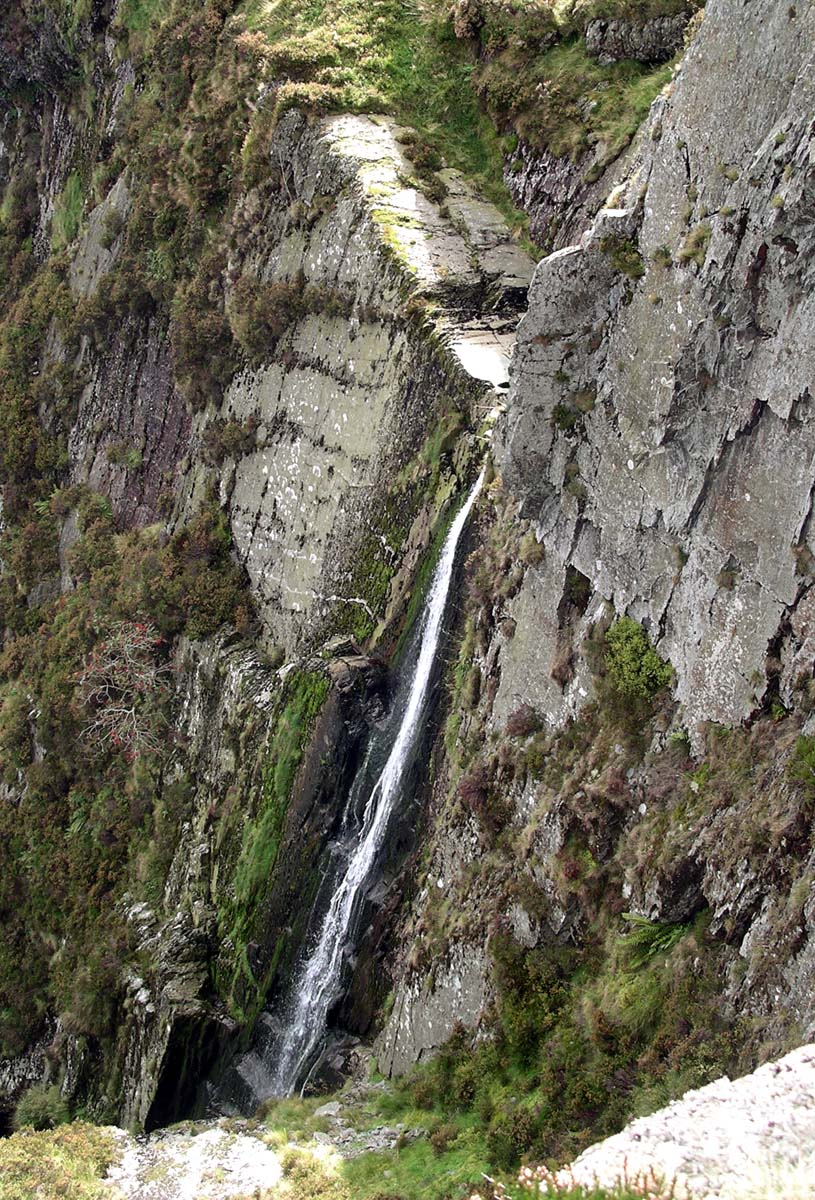
Hanging valley waterfall on flanks of Maesglase

The eastern slopes are devoted to sheep farming whilst the western slopes are intensively forested.

Above the semi-improved grassland is some bracken but much of the higher ground is covered in typical Calluna / Erica communities interspersed with large areas of Juncus, Carex and Sphagnum bogs. The tops of Cribin Fawr are flat expanses of peat-hags. On the eastern flanks Bilberry (Vaccinium myrtillus) grows in abundance with Cowberry (Vaccinium vitis-idaea) common on the highest ground.

Half a mile to the west of the peak of Cribin Fawr at a high point of 659 metres (2,162 ft) is a stone boundary marker dated 1861 and inscribed CCC and bearing a benchmark. Maesglase waterfall has a total height of 160 metres (520 ft).

To the south lie the parallel ridges leading to Mynydd Dolgoed and Mynydd Gartheiniog.

The site is the location of the Welsh-language novel O! Tyn y Gorchudd! by Angharad Price.
