= Dyfi hills =

Hill range in north Wales

Map of the Dyfi Hills

The Dyfi hills (sometimes anglicised to Dovey hills) are a range situated in the southernmost area of Snowdonia, bounded by the River Dyfi on the east and south sides, by the Afon Dulas on the west and the Afon Cerist to the north. They lie to the west of the Aran Fawddwy range, north-east of the Tarren y Gesail range and are a subgroup of the Cadair Idris group.

The highest peaks of the Dyfi hills are Maesglase (2,218 feet (676 m)), Waun-oer (2,200 feet (670 m)) and Cribin Fawr (2,162 feet (659 m)) which lie at the north of the range. Further south the peaks are lower and the hills more gently rounded.

== Slate quarrying ==
Two major veins of commercial quality slate run through the Dyfi hills, from Aberllefenni in the west, to Dinas Mawddwy in the north-east. Several commercial quarries worked these veins during the 19th and the first half of the 20th centuries. Major quarries in the area include Ratgoed on Mynydd Llwydiarth and Cymerau on Mynydd Cymerau in the west; Hendre Ddu on Mynydd Hendre-ddu, Gartheiniog on Mynydd Gartheiniog in the centre of the hills; and Minllyn on Foel Dinas just south of Dinas Mawddwy.

== Forestry ==
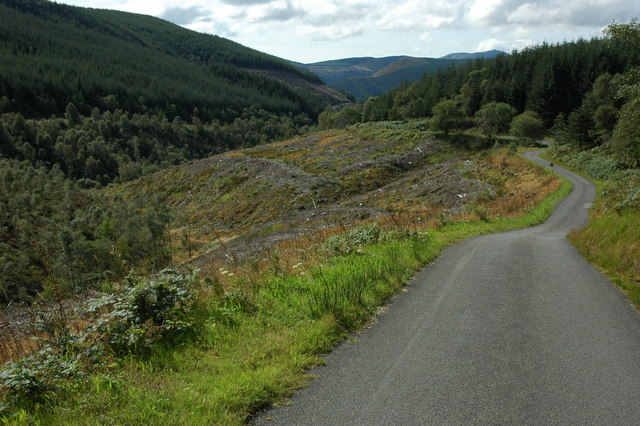
Felling activity in the Dyfi Forest

The majority of the area of the Dyfi Hills was planted with forests by the Forestry Commission. Planting started in 1926, and huge areas of land were purchased between the Wars and into the 1950s and 1960s. The trees planted were mainly Sitka Spruce and Japanese Larch, though a large number of other species were also tried. The trees are regularly felled for commercial use and replanted. This forested area forms the major part of the Dyfi Forest.

== Rallying ==
They were used as a special stage during the 2013 Wales Rally GB.
