= Waun-oer =

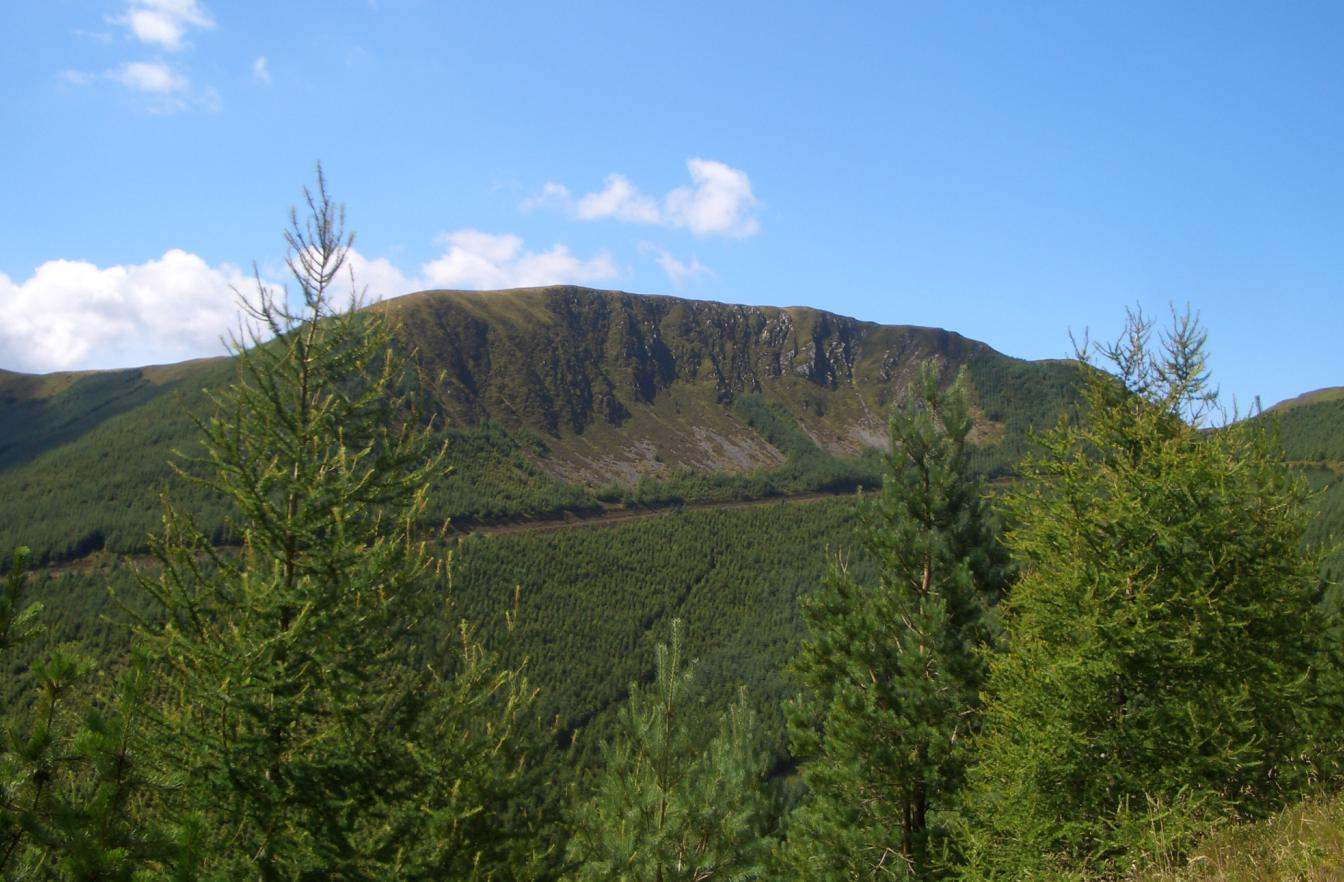
- Waun-oer from the southeast

Highest point
- Elevation: 670 m (2,200 ft)
- Prominence: 119 m (390 ft)
- Parent peak: Maesglase
- Listing: Hewitt, Nuttall, HuMP
- Coordinates: 52.7171°N 3.7985°W

Naming
- English translation: Cold Bog
- Language of name: Welsh

Geography
- Location within Wales
- Location: Snowdonia, Wales
- Parent range: Cadair Idris
- OS grid: SH785147
- Topo map: OS Explorer OL23

Waun-oer is a mountain in Snowdonia, North Wales, situated approximately four miles to the south-west of Aran Fawddwy. It is one of the peaks in the Dyfi hills, a subgroup of the Cadair Idris group. It is a top of Maesglase and the summit consists of a trig point that crowns an uneven grassy plateau. It is connected to Cribin Fawr to the east and Mynydd Ceiswyn to the south. To the north lies Cadair Idris, while Tarren y Gesail lies to the west.
