= Mynydd Llwydiarth =

Mountain in Snowdonia, Wales

Coordinates: 52.70769882°N 3.78222972°W

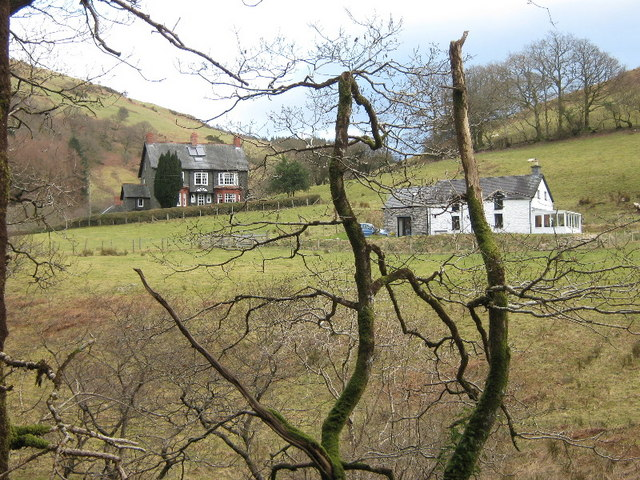
- Llwydiarth Hall on the southern slopes of Mynydd Llwydiarth

Highest point
- Elevation: 467 m (1,532 ft)

Naming
- Language of name: Welsh

Geography
- Location: Gwynedd, UK
- Parent range: Snowdonia

Mynydd Llwydiarth is a mountain in southern Snowdonia, Wales. It is a long ridge running from a low summit to the south of Mynydd Dolgoed, running south-west to Mynydd Cymerau. Nant Llwydiarth rises on the south flank of the mountain, and on the west slope the Ratgoed slate quarry operated until 1946.

It is one of the Dyfi hills.
