= Mynydd Gartheiniog =

Mountain in southern Snowdonia, Wales

Coordinates: 52.7167°N 3.75°W

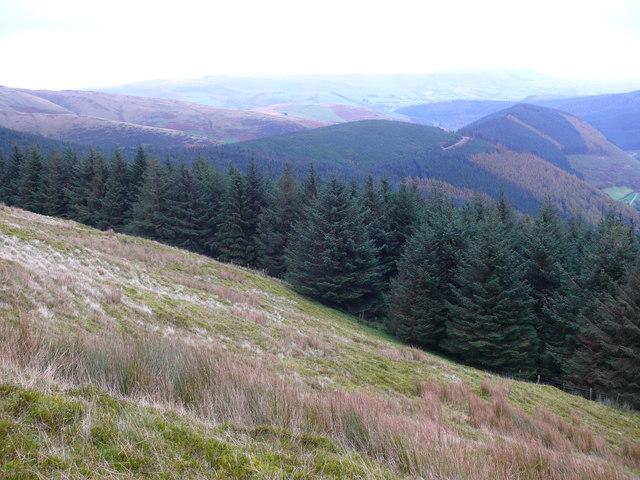
- The slopes of Mynydd Gartheiniog, looking east towards the Dyfi valley

Highest point
- Elevation: 640 m (2,100 ft)
- Prominence: 34 m (112 ft)

Naming
- Language of name: Welsh

Geography
- Location: Gwynedd, UK
- Parent range: Snowdonia

Mynydd Gartheiniog is a mountain in southern Snowdonia, Wales. It is a long ridge running south from the cliff of Craig Portas above Dinas Mawddwy and parallel to Mynydd Dolgoed which lies to the west.

The Gartheiniog slate quarry sits on its eastern flank, and was served by the Hendre-Ddu Tramway.

It is one of the Dyfi hills.
