= Mynydd Dolgoed =

Mountain in Gwynedd, Wales

Coordinates: 52.70769882°N 3.78222972°W

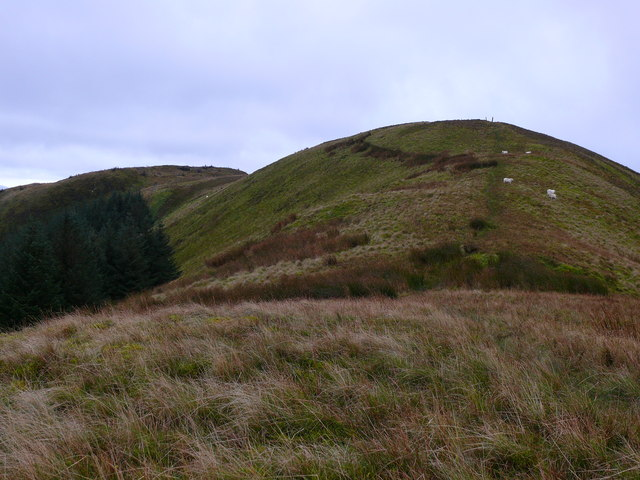
- The summit of Mynydd Dolgoed

Highest point
- Elevation: 604 m (1,982 ft)
- Prominence: 54 m (177 ft)

Naming
- Language of name: Welsh

Geography
- Location: Gwynedd, UK
- Parent range: Cadair Idris

Mynydd Dolgoed or Craig Portas is a mountain in southern Snowdonia, Wales. It is a long ridge running from a low summit between the valleys of the Afon Angell and the Nant Ceiswyn, north east to the cliff of Craig Portas above Dinas Mawddwy. The next mountain in the ridge to south-east is Mynydd Hendre-ddu, while to the south lie Mynydd Llwydiarth and Mynydd Cymerau.

It is one of the Dyfi hills.

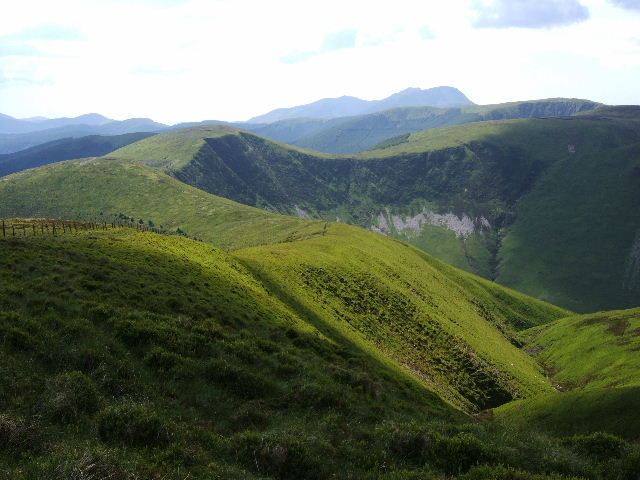
Craig Portas, the large cliff that lies at the north end of Mynydd Dolgoed
