= Afon Angell =

River in Gwynedd, Mid Wales

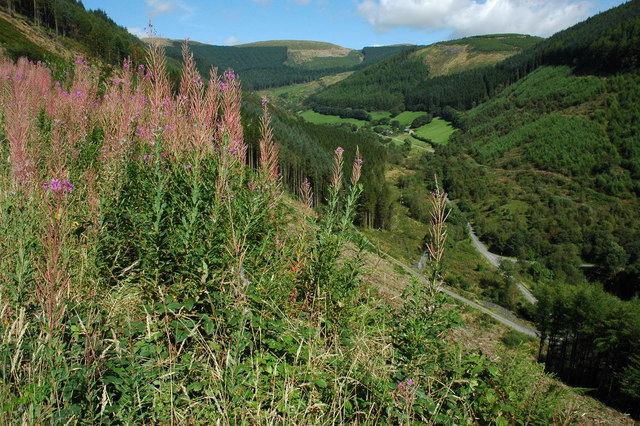
- The valley of the Afon Angell looking west near Gartheiniog Farm

Location
- Country: Wales
- Region: Gwynedd

Physical characteristics
- Mouth
  - location: River Dyfi, Aberangell
  - coordinates: 52°40′18″N 3°42′33″W

The Afon Angell is a river in Gwynedd, Mid Wales.

The river flows eastwards from its source on the eastern flank of Mynydd Dolgoed, joining the Afon Dyfi at the small village of Aberangell. The river was known for its salmon and trout fishing in the Victoria era. A number of slate mines were once found along its length, linked to Aberangell by the Hendre-Ddu Tramway.
