= Cymerau quarry =

Slate quarry in Wales

Cymerau
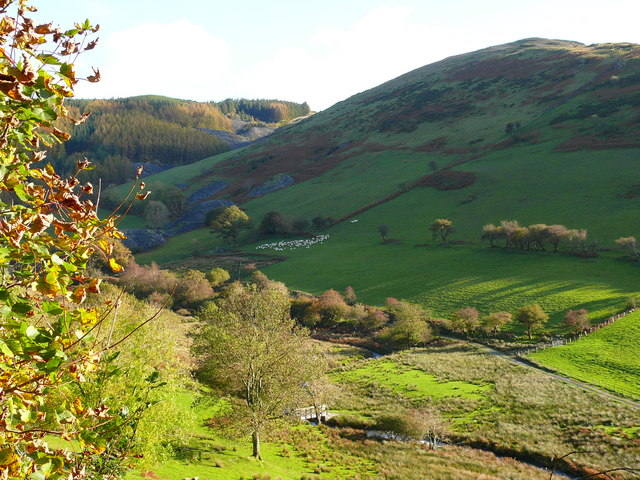
- View of Cwm Ratgoed on 18 October 2008; the northern workings of Cymerau are in the middle distance, and the trackbed of the former Ratgoed Tramway passes below

- Location in Gwynedd

Location
- Location: near Aberllefenni, Merioneth (now Gwynedd), Wales, UK; 52.68500°N 3.8140°W grid reference SH 768 102

Production
- Products: Slate
- Type: Quarry

History
- Opened: c.1860 (southern quarry); c.1880 (northern quarry)
- Active: c.1860–1914; 1918–October 1946
- Closed: October 1946 (both quarries)

Map of the area north of Aberllefenni, showing Cymerau quarry

Cymerau quarry was a slate quarry served by the Ratgoed Tramway, a horse-worked section of the Corris Railway. It is located about half a mile north of Aberllefenni in Merioneth (now Gwynedd), North Wales, on the eastern side of the isolated Cwm Ceiswyn. It worked the Narrow Vein, the highest-quality slate vein in the Abercorris Group.

== History ==
=== Early years ===
Cymerau was started around 1860, following the success of the earlier Ratgoed quarry to the north. Slate was extracted from five underground chambers which were below the water table and were pumped using a waterwheel.

In 1864 the Ratgoed Tramway opened, a 2 ft 3 in (686 mm) gauge horse-worked tramway which connected the Ratgoed and Cymerau quarries with the newly opened Corris Railway at Aberllefenni. This prompted significant expansion work at the quarry. In 1878, the quarry was owned by H. R. Hughes and his nephew.

=== Second quarry ===
A second quarry was opened around 1880 between the original Cymerau workings and Ratgoed. This was a series of surface pits, connected to the Ratgoed Tramway by an incline. Slate was taken down to the mill at the southern site for processing.

Cymerau had several private wagons which it used to haul slate along the Ratgoed Tramway and on down the Corris Railway to Machynlleth.

At its peak the quarry employed over 100 men.

=== The First World War to closure ===
Cymerau and Ratgoed were worked as a single operation immediately before the First World War. Both quarries closed down during the First World War.

Cymerau re-opened on a smaller scale after the conflict, owned by the Inigo Jones company of Groeslon. In 1921 it produced just three tons of finished slab, and employed only three men. Fortunes improved modestly during the 1920s, reaching a peak employment of 14 men in 1927.

Slab from the quarry was roughly shaped and planed in the Cymerau Mill, before being shipped out by the Ratgoed Tramway to Aberllefenni, then the Corris Railway to Machynlleth, before being transferred to the main line and shipped to Groeslon for finishing and enamelling.

Cymerau continued its limited production during the 1930s. By the outbreak of the Second World War the quarry was down to just 6 men employed. It continued to produce through the war years, but finally closed in October 1946.
