= Nant Llwydiarth =

River in Wales

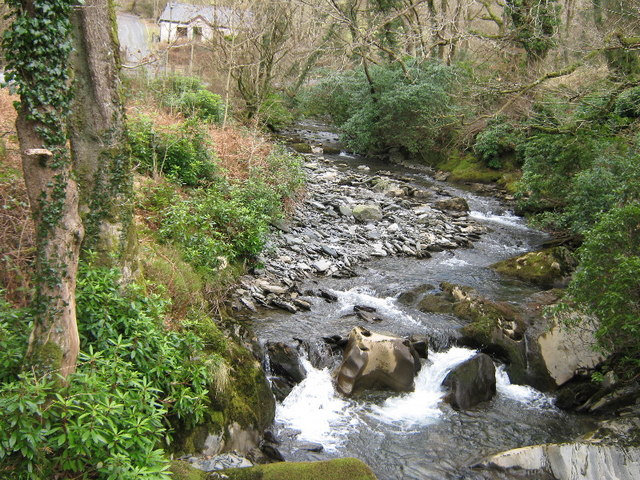
- The Nant Llwydiarth below Llwydiarth Hall

Location
- Country: Wales

Physical characteristics
- Source: Mynydd Hendre-ddu
  - elevation: 1,200 ft (370 m)
- Mouth
  - location: Pont Cymerau, Aberllefenni
  - coordinates: 52°40′40″N 3°48′30″W

The Nant Llwydiarth is a small river in Mid Wales. It flows from the southern flank of Mynydd Hendre-ddu down to Pont Cymerau, north-east of Aberllefenni. Here it joins the Nant Ceiswyn to form the Afon Dulas that flows south to the Afon Dyfi. There was an ancient bridge at Pont Cymerau.
