= Cwm Hengae =

Valley in Wales

- Cwm Llefenni
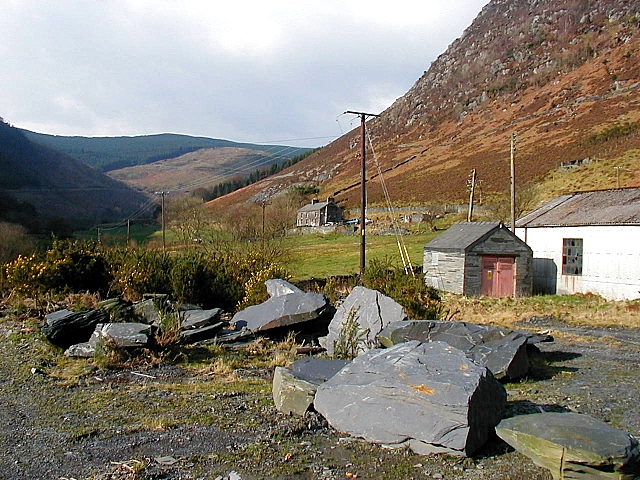
- Looking west from Aberllefenni quarry along Cwm Hengae

Geography
- Location: Aberllefenni
- Country: Wales
- Coordinates: 52.673°N 3.819°W
- River: Afon Llefenni
- Interactive map of Cwm Hengae

Cwm Hengae is a valley that runs roughly north-west from the village of Aberllefenni in Wales. The Afon Llefenni river runs along the valley and several slate quarries occupy the valley sides. The Roman road Sarn Helen ran along the valley, connecting Aberllefenni with Dolgellau.

== Hengae House ==
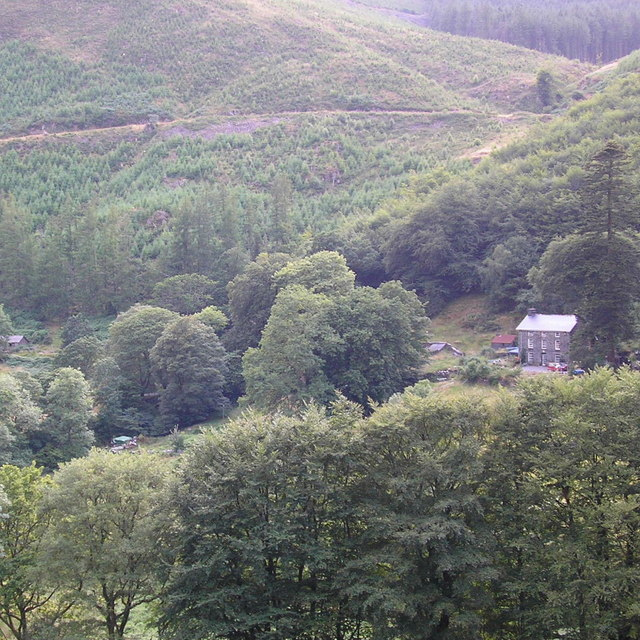
Hengae House, seen from the north

At the point where the Nant Bychan joins the Afon Llefenni, about a third of the way from Aberllefenni to the head of the valley is Hengae House. This was the home of the Anwyl family during the 19th century.

== Slate quarrying ==
The major industry in Cwm Hengae was slate quarrying. Near the eastern end of the valley lie the three quarries that make up the Aberllefenni Quarry. On the south side of the valley are the Hen Gloddfa and Ceunant Du quarries, while on the north is Foel Grochan, named after the mountain it mined. These may have started working as early as the 14th century; the earliest confirmed date of operating is 1500 when the local house Plas Aberllefenni was roofed in slates from the mine. The mines were in continuous operation until 2002, making them the longest continually working slate mines in the world.

Further west, on the flank of Mynydd Cambergi lies Cambergi quarry, a less successful endeavor. On the south side of the valley, opposite Cambergi is the even less successful Hengae quarry. There are a few much smaller trial workings towards the head of the valley.
