= Samuel Ellis and Company =

Defunct British engineering company

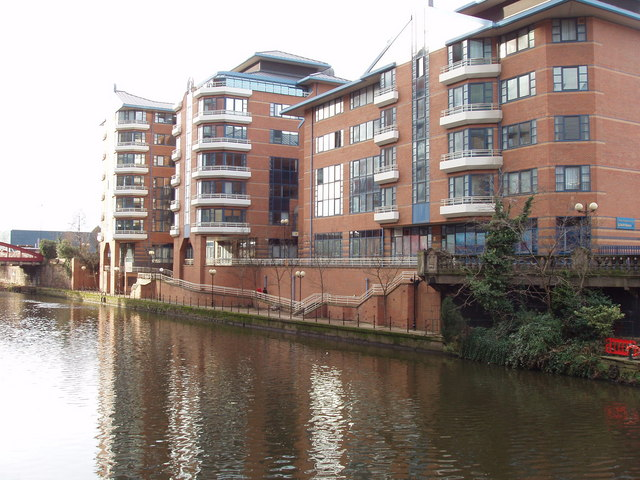
The Customs and Excise building in Salford, built on the site of the Irwell Foundry

Samuel Ellis and Company (also known as H & J Ellis) was a British engineering company, based in Salford, Lancashire. It operated, in various form, from 1832 to 1887.

== History ==
=== Samuel Ellis ===
Samuel Ellis was born in 1803 at Melinrhyd, near Cyfronydd in Mid Wales. He showed an early interest in mechanical devices, and when he was 11 he built a model of a watermill that included novel improvements to the mechanism. His father, Hugh Ellis, was so impressed that he incorporated Samuel's suggested improvements in his own mill.

In 1826, against his parents' wishes, Ellis walked to Manchester to seek work in the engineering industry. He quickly found work, and established himself. Within three years he had been promoted to foreman. In 1829, married Jane Irlam. They went on to have 6 children.

=== Ellis and Noton ===
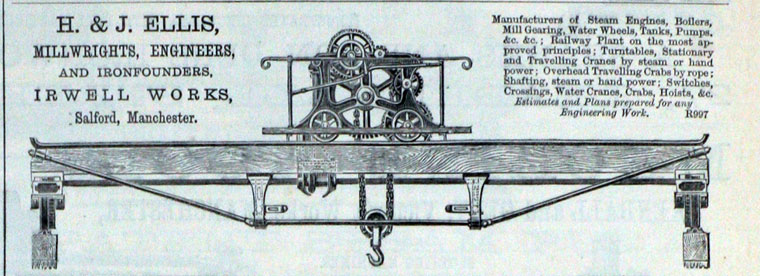
1870 advertisement showing an H & J Ellis travelling crane

In 1832, Ellis branched out on his own, partnering with Michael Noton and forming the company of Ellis and Noton, millwrights and engineers. They established an iron foundry - the Irwell Foundry - at 2 Stanley Street in Salford, where they specialised in manufacturing cranes. The building had formerly been a school for deaf and dumb children.

In 1842, Ellis invented a new form of Railway turntable, which was held firmly in place when trains were passing directly over it, and could be raised to allow it to turn. This made it safer and quieter to have turntables placed in the main running line, a common practice at that time. In 1843, he patented the new turntable and they were supplied to many railways including the Liverpool and Manchester Railway, the Manchester and Leeds Railway and the Northern and Eastern Railway. The largest example that Ellis and Noton produced was 32 feet (9.8 m) in diameter for the Dublin and Drogheda Railway; at the time this was the largest turntable in Europe. Robert Stephenson introduced Ellis to lawyer Thomas William Kennard who became part owner of the patent, and helped Ellis promote the new invention. Work at the Irwell Foundry trebled within six months as orders for the turntable arrived.

The partnership was dissolved in 1845, and Noton left to form his own engineering company.

=== Samuel Ellis and Company ===
Following the dissolution of Ellis and Noton, Ellis and Kennard partnered to form Samuel Ellis and Company to operate and expand the Irwell Foundry. Ellis continued to work on improved designs for cranes. In 1845 he developed a compact 40-ton crane for the London and Birmingham Railway on a foundation measuring just 16 square feet. The same design was also installed at Camden Road railway station. In 1847, Ellis patented a travelling crane which received many orders from railways across Britain.

In February 1852, the partnership between Ellis and Kennard was dissolved, with Ellis continuing to run the business. Ellis died on 5 April 1852 at his home in Pendleton.

=== H & J Ellis ===
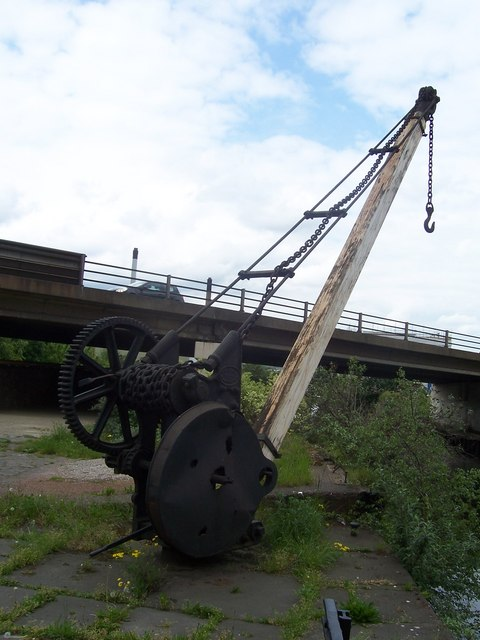
A surviving H & J Ellis hand-powered crane at Rotherham

Following Samuel Ellis's death, the Irwell Foundry was taken over by his nephews Hugh and John Ellis. Around 1860, they formed a new company called H & J Ellis. They continued to produce cranes to the designs of Samuel Ellis, and in 1869 they received a patent for "improvements in cranes raising merchandise and weights of all descriptions".

In 1872, there was a fatal accident at the foundry, when 28-year-old Charles Walton has struck on the head by a brake handle while working on a travelling crane in the foundry yard. In 1884, a major fire broke out at the foundry, seriously damaging the works and causing its closure. It is believed that the foundry did not re-open after this date and in 1887, the foundry and all its remaining equipment and inventory was put up for sale.
