= Ratgoed Tramway =

- Map of the Aberllefenni area, showing the Ratgoed Tramway

Overview
- Termini: Aberllefenni; Ratgoed Quarry

Service
- Type: Horse-drawn industrial tramway
- System: Corris Railway

History
- Opened: 1864
- Closed: 1952

Technical
- Line length: 1.75 mi (2.82 km)
- Track gauge: 2 ft 3 in (686 mm)

The Ratgoed Tramway (originally known as the Ty Cam branch) was a 2 ft 3 in (686 mm) gauge horse-worked tramway that connected the remote Ratgoed Quarry with the Corris Railway at Aberllefenni. It was 1 3/4 miles (2.8 km) long.

== History ==
=== Opening ===
Ratgoed Quarry was first opened before 1844. After a period of closure in the second half of the 1840s, it re-opened in 1851. In 1859, the Corris, Machynlleth & River Dovey Tramroad (later renamed the Corris Railway) opened between the village of Aberllefenni and the wharf at Morben. This provided a cost-effective transport link for the slate quarries along the Dulas valley, but its northern terminus was at Aberllefenni more than 1 mile (1.6 km) south of Ratgoed Quarry.

The 1858 Act of Parliament that authorised the Corris, Machynlleth & River Dovey Tramroad included the Ty Cam branch which ran from Aberllefenni to Ratgoed. This branch was built in 1864, four years after the Tramroad had arrived at Aberllefenni. The branch was later commonly known as the Ratgoed Tramway and although it was technically a branch of the Corris Railway, it operated as a separate entity throughout its history.

=== Cymerau Quarry ===
Cymerau Quarry lies to the south of Ratgoed, and it was connected to the tramway from the start. The original workings were near the mill, adjacent to Cymerau Farm. Around 1880, a set of pits between Ratgoed Quarry and the original workings were opened, and the tramway was used to take uncut slate between these new workings and the mill, a distance of about 1/2 mile (0.8 km).

=== Last years ===
The tramway passed into the ownership of the Great Western Railway (GWR) in late 1929, when the GWR acquired the Corris Railway. In 1948, the Corris was nationalised and became part of British Railways (BR), as did the Ratgoed Tramway. The Corris closed in August 1948, but the Ratgoed continued to operate, as an isolated section of horse-drawn narrow-gauge tramway operated by BR.

=== Closure ===
After the closure of the Corris Railway, the Ratgoed Tramway continued to provide the only transport link between the quarry and the transhipment point at Aberllefenni. It finally closed in 1952, with all the track lifted by the end of that year.

== Route ==
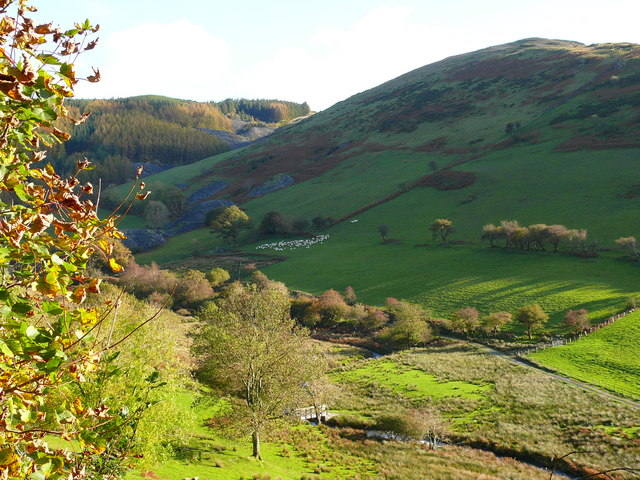
The tramway trackbed on the far side of the valley bottom, heading north from Cymerau towards Ratgoed quarry

The northern end of the tramway was just outside Ratgoed Hall, a building used by the quarry owners. The tramway ran almost due south, to a passing loop at the foot of the exit incline down from Ratgoed Quarry. The lower mill stood here, on the west side of the tramway. About 100 yards (91 m) south lay a small chapel and a row of cottages arranged at right-angles to the tramway. The cottage nearest the tramway had a bay window overlooking the track and served as the shop for the hamlet. To the south of the cottages was the quarry office.

The tramway crossed a small stream which emptied into a large reservoir on the west side of the track. The line curved slightly to the west and entered the upper yard of Cymerau quarry. An incline on the east side of the tramway led up to the northern Cymerau workings, and there was a gunpowder magazine further south, also on the west side. The tramway continued south, past Ffynnon Badarn farm, the turning to run briefly south-west before resuming a southerly course and following the curves of Nant Ceiswyn.

The tramway then came to the lower yard of Cymerau quarry. Tracks branched off to the east, with one entering a level, while another headed south to the main Cymerau mill. The tramway the crossed over the Ceiwyn on a fine stone bridge which still exists. It curved gently to the east in a cutting above the river and on the opposite bank to the main Cymerau mill and waste tips. Staying in the cutting, the line swung round to run eastwards above the river before negotiating a tight curve to run south, opposite Hen Factory and Pont Cymerau. Running due south again, the line passed through woods and came to Islwyn, another tiny hamlet. There was a congregational chapel - Capel Bethesda - here, a few houses and a school. There was a siding here to allow goods to be transferred from the tramway wagons for the use of the villagers.

Curving back to run westwards again, the tramway passed behind the school, where there was a passing loop in the 1880s. The tramway is here on a small ledge just above the road from Llwydiarth to Aberllefenni and some distance above the Afon Dulas. The tramway threaded its way between the houses on the north-east corner of Aberllefenni village. At this point it was on a slate embankment above the Llwydiarth road. It then curved sharply to the south, crossing on a bridge over the road and tramway leading to Aberllefenni quarries. Continuing on a tall slate embankment, the line headed south past the Aberllefenni mill reservoir and quarry office, and passing behind Pensarn, the main terrace of cottages in the village. Dropping steeply, it ended just north of Aberllefenni station where it joined the formal terminus of the Corris Railway. A tramway from the Aberllefenni mill joined the Ratgoed here with a single-bladed point.

== Operations ==
The tramway was laid in light, iron, bridge rail, although a section between Aberllefenni and Islwyn was relaid in flat-bottomed rail in the 1920s, using rails recovered from a local timber tramway.

Trains, often formed of a single waggon, were hauled up the line by horse. Loaded slate wagons would then return to Aberllefenni by gravity - the line was laid on a consistent falling gradient. As well as slate traffic from Ratgoed and Cymerau quarries, the line served the farms and houses along Cwm Ceiswyn, supplying coal and goods to them. Informal passenger services ran regularly on the tramway, with people riding in the open slate waggons. One waggon was even converted using wooden planks as seats. It was possibly the last horse tramway in Britain that carried passengers.
