= Upper Corris Tramway =

Former tramway in Wales

Overview
- Other name(s): Ty'n y Berth Tramway
- Termini: Maespoeth Junction; Corris Uchaf

Service
- Type: Horse-drawn industrial tramway
- System: Corris Railway

History
- Opened: 1859
- Closed: 1927

Technical
- Line length: 1.8 mi (2.9 km)
- Track gauge: 2 ft 3 in (686 mm)

The Upper Corris Tramway was a 2 ft 3 in (686 mm) gauge horse-worked tramway that connected the slate quarries around the villages of Corris and Corris Uchaf with the Corris Railway at Maespoeth Junction. It was just over 1.8 miles (2.9 km) long.

== History ==
=== Opening ===
The tramway was originally called the Ty'n y Berth Tramway as it was intended to connect to an incline down from the Ty'n y Berth Quarry to the north of Corris Uchaf. This quarry closed before the tramway was built, so the line was terminated in the village and never reached the quarry it was named for. From the early days of operation, it was called the Upper Corris Tramway, after the English name for Corris Uchaf. The tramway opened in 1859, at the same time as the main Corris Railway.

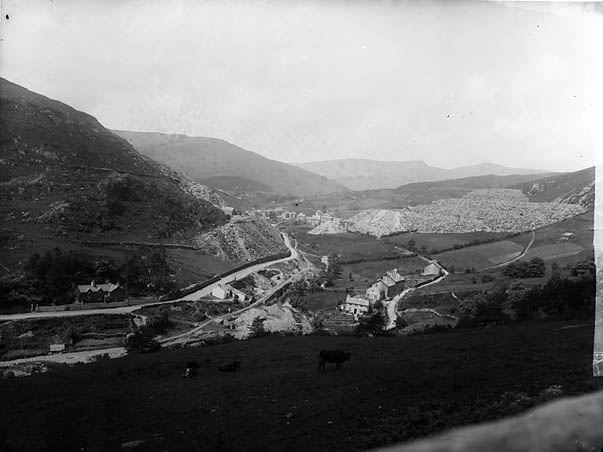
The Upper Corris Tramway around 1885 running below the road to Corris Uchaf. The tips of Gaewern are on the left, and Abercwmeiddaw on the right

=== Before the First World War ===
In 1909, part of the tramway was re-sleepered. This was the first track maintenance on the tramway for more than 25 years.

=== Closure ===
Slate traffic along the tramway fell steeply between 1924 and 1926. In 1926, the Corris Railway raised its prices for carrying the slate to compensate for their lost revenue. Braichgoch, the largest customer of the tramway, responded by buying a steam road wagon and using that to transport its output to Machynlleth. With the other quarries along the tramway also shut down, the Corris closed the tramway in July 1927. The track remained in place until the early years of the Second World War, when it was lifted as part of the wartime scrap drives.

== Proposed extensions ==
Several plans were made to extend the tramway beyond Corris Uchaf. The first of these, proposed in 1862, would have taken the line above the east end of Tal-y-llyn Lake and over Bwlch Llyn Bach pass, before dropping down to the Tir Stynt copper mines near Cross Foxes, a total distance of 6 miles (9.7 km). A Bill was introduced in Parliament to authorise this extension, but it also allowed the main Corris Railway to use steam locomotives, and the directors of the Aberystwith and Welsh Coast Railway objected, and the Bill failed.

The second proposal was for a line running north, then east, about a mile to reach an incline up to the Glyn Iago and Ty'n y Ceunant quarries on the slopes of Tarren y Gesail. Although part of the incline and some earthworks for the tramway extension were built in the 1890s, no track was laid.

The third proposal came in the mid-1900s. The manager of the Corris Railway, J. J. O'Sullivan, proposed extending the line towards Tal-y-llyn Lake, but this time running high above the southern shore of the lake and reaching Abergynolwyn where it would connect to the Talyllyn Railway. This proposal was not approved by the company directors and no work was done on it.

== Route ==
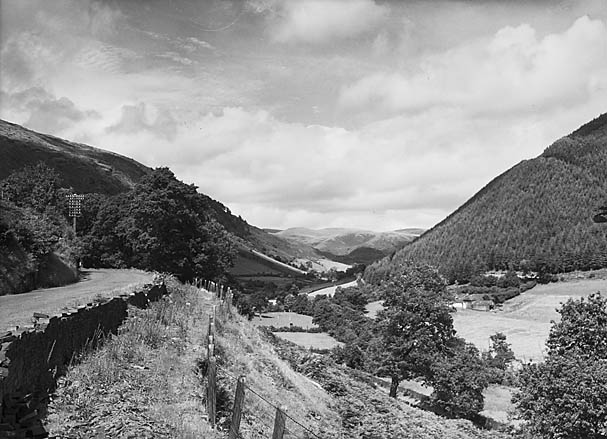
The course of the Upper Corris Tramway between Maespoeth and Braichgoch Inn

The tramway started at Maespoeth Junction, where it joined the Corris Railway. The tramway separated from the mainline to the south of the locomotive shed at Maespoeth. While the main line continued to rise gently as it headed towards Corris, the tramway ascended more steeply, running beside the Machynlleth to Dolgellau road. As the tramway passed between the locomotive shed and the road, there was a siding used to store empty wagons waiting to return to the quarries.

The tramway followed the road, climbing steeply. It passed to the west of Corris village, opposite the Braich Goch Inn. Here the tramway crossed over the road into Corris village on the level then entered a short cut and cover tunnel as it passed between the road and a row of cottages on the east side of the track. This tunnel was too low and narrow to allow steam locomotives to enter, and was the main reason the tramway was horse-worked for its entire existence.

After the tunnel, the tramway swung round a very sharp curve below the Hughes Memorial. Running almost due-west and below the level of the road, the tramway ran past Braichgoch Terrace and entered the yard of Braichgoch quarry. A line branched off to the north, dropping into the quarry yard, which sat on a large platform of slate waste. The tramway proper continued to climb and passed to the south of the Braichgoch quarry office and reached the level of the road. It passed over a steep incline down from the Braichgoch level 7 incline, then passed underneath a high bridge that carried the internal quarry tramway from the Braichgoch level 5 adit to the head of a short incline down to the mill.

The tramway now followed the route of the road along the south side of the Afon Deri as it swung to the northwest. The road climbed more steeply, while the tramway kept to a narrow ledge. On the left side of the tramway and road were the tips of Gaewern quarry, with a tramway connecting Gaewern to Braichgoch mill running parallel but considerably higher up the mountain. As the road turned north, the tramway swung away from it and was considerably lower. It curved gently as it passed between the road to the west and the river to the east. It passed on the riverside of a large house, and here the tramway up to Abercorris quarry branched off and crossed the river.

The tramway curved back to the northwest, still following but below the road. On the south side of the road lay the main mills of Gaewern quarry, connected to the tramway by a branch when Gaewern operated independently of Braichgoch. At least one adit ran under the road and into the Gaewern vein. The tramway continued, finishing the long curve to run almost due west and enter the village of Corris Uchaf. It passed between a row of houses and the road. The branch to Abercwmeiddaw quarry left here, running north, crossing the Afon Deri by a bridge before ending at the foot of the Abercwmeiddaw exit incline. The tramway continued on northwest for another 200 yards (180 m), passing behind the village post office to a slate enamelling works.

== Operations ==
=== Quarries served ===
The furthest quarry from Maespoeth Junction was Abercwmeiddaw on the north bank of the Afon Deri. A branch of the tramway crossed the river near the terminus in Corris Uchaf, and ended at the foot of a long incline up to the quarry mill level.

Abercorris quarry was also on the north bank of the river, and was connected to the tramway by a branch that crossed the river, then ascended the valley side via a reversing spur. Again, an incline led up to the quarry mill.

On the south bank of the Afon Deri lay Gaewern and Braichgoch quarries. For much of their lives, these quarries were worked as a single concern. The Upper Corris Tramway passed through the main yard of Braichgoch quarry, and a number of short branches connected to the mill and stacking yards.

=== Slate Traffic ===
Slate was carried in slate waggons which ran in trains down to Maespoeth Junction by gravity. Empty waggons were hauled uphill from Maespoeth to the quarry by horses.

=== Passenger traffic ===
No formal passenger services were ever run on the tramway, although there is some evidence that the company may have charged people to ride in slate waggons along the route.

== Remains ==
Much of the route of the tramway was removed when the A487 was widened in the 1980s. The section of the tramway from Braichgoch quarry to the south end of Corris Uchaf was buried under these works. Below Braichgoch quarry, the trackbed is largely intact, including the section above Corris village where the line is in cutting between the road and several local houses: the houses still have slate bridges over the tramway to access their front doors. Several of the branches to the quarries can still be traced in 2019. A short section has been restored to serve as a loading siding at Maespoeth.
