= Ratgoed quarry =

Former quarry in Wales

Ratgoed
- Location in Gwynedd
- Location: near Aberllefenni, Merioneth (now Gwynedd), Wales, UK; 52.6897°N 3.8004°W SH 78327 11782
- Products: Slate
- Type: Quarry
- Opened: before 1844
- Active: c.1840–late 1840s; 1851–1900; 1901–1903; 1907–1946
- Closed: 1946

Ratgoed quarry (also known as Alltgoed quarry) was the northernmost of the slate quarries served by the Corris Railway. It is one mile north of Aberllefenni in Gwynedd, Mid Wales, on the western side of Mynydd Llwydiarth. The quarry primarily worked the Narrow Vein, though it also produced some Broad Vein slates.

== Original workings ==
The original workings at Alltgoed Quarry date back to before 1844 when a quarter share of the quarry was put up for sale after the bankruptcy of William Hughes. In the second half of 1840s the quarry was closed. It re-opened in 1851. The quarry expanded in the 1850s and was being run by John Rowlands under the auspices of the Alltgoed Consols, a partnership that also owned the nearby Gaewern and Braich Goch quarries. During the early 1860s shareholder discontent lead to the dismissal of Rowlands, with the quarry now being run by the original owner Horatio Nelson Hughes.

Rowlands continued to live at Ratgoed Hall after his dismissal, and was also the chairman of the Corris Railway.

From the mid-1870s onwards the quarry was generally called Ratgoed.

== Tramway era ==
=== Expansion ===
The fortunes of the quarry were improved significantly in 1864 when the Ratgoed Tramway opened, a 2 ft 3 in (686 mm) gauge horse worked tramway, which was an autonomous branch of the newly opened Corris Railway. Connecting the remote quarry with the Corris Railway at Aberllefenni prompted significant expansion work at the quarry, enabling it to operate profitably until 1878; but in 1879 slate prices dropped throughout the industry and small, remote concerns like Ratgoed suffered in the downturn.

=== Decline and closure ===
The quarry continued production through the 1880s, but at a reduced annual output. Fortunes revived in the early 1890s, but towards the end of the century the accessible supplies of more profitable roofing slates at Ratgoed were running dry and the owners attempted to sell the business in 1897. By 1900 the remaining workforce was dismissed and the quarry closed.

=== Revived operation ===
During the first half of the twentieth century the quarry was reopened, but experienced fluctuating trade, and never flourished. The first reopening was in 1901 but it had to close again in 1903 as prices for slab slate fell again.

In 1907 another restart was attempted and by 1911 more than 30 men were employed at Ratgoed. The advent of the First World War a year later again brought troubled times to the quarry and in 1918 only 6 men were employed.

The quarry struggled on after the war. In 1924 the local company of Hall Harber & Thomas Ltd. purchased Ratgoed. They also owned the Llwyngwern quarry about 5 miles (8 km) to the south. Initially the new company doubled the workforce, but this declined steadily through the late 1920s. In 1930, control of the quarry returned to the Lewis family who had owned it prior to 1924.

Work continued at a reduced output through the 1930s and the years of the Second World War, but in 1946 the quarry finally shut for good.

== The site today ==
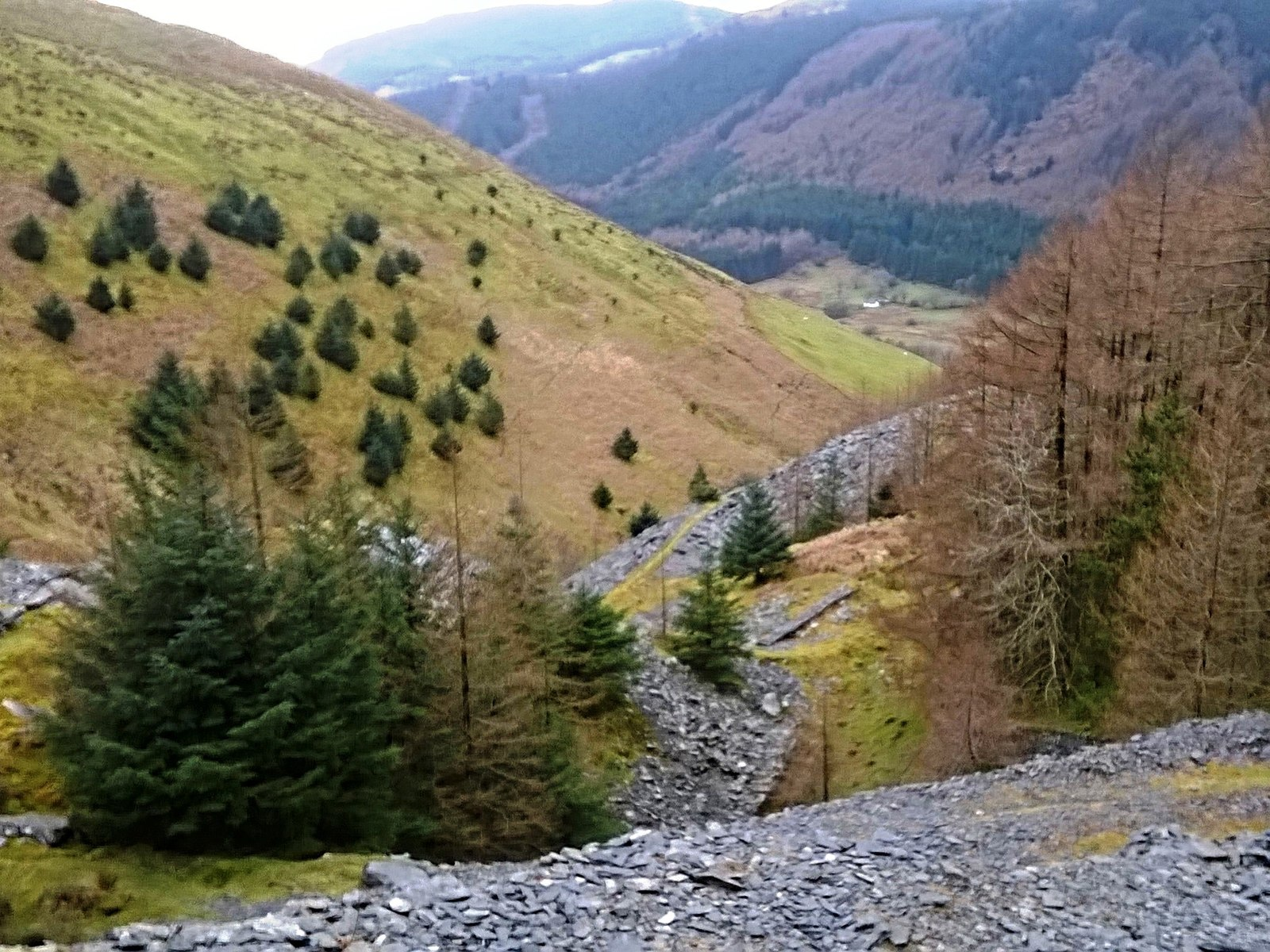
The waste tips of Ratgoed quarry in 2018

The former quarry owner's house, Plas Ratgoed, is the only remaining habitable building in the hamlet of Ratgoed, although nearby the houses Ffynnon Badarn, Dolgoed and Ceiswyn remain in use. Ty Cam, Ratgoed Terrace and Capel Ratgoed mostly remain standing, but roofless.
