= Corris Uchaf =

Village in Gwynedd, Wales

Coordinates: 52.662°N 3.859°W

Corris Uchaf Upper Corris
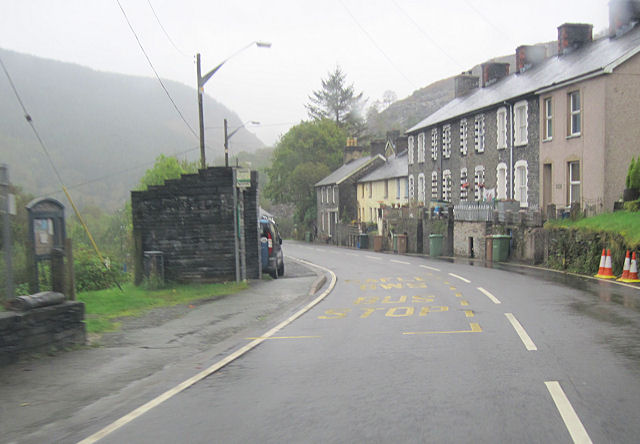
- Corris Uchaf

- Location within Gwynedd
- OS grid reference: SH743088
- Community: Corris
- Principal area: Gwynedd
- Preserved county: Gwynedd
- Country: Wales
- Sovereign state: United Kingdom
- Post town: MACHYNLLETH
- Postcode district: SY20
- Dialling code: 01654
- Police: North Wales
- Fire: North Wales
- Ambulance: Welsh
- UK Parliament: Meirionnydd Nant Conwy
- Senedd Cymru – Welsh Parliament: Dwyfor Meirionnydd

Corris Uchaf, also known as Upper Corris, is a village in the south of Snowdonia National Park in Gwynedd, Wales. The slate quarries that surround Corris Uchaf are its most prominent feature. It lies about 1.5 miles north of Corris.

== Description ==
The village lies in the valley of the Afon Deri (River Deri), and is threaded by the A487 trunk road between Dolgellau and Machynlleth. The Afon Deri runs into the Afon Dulas.

The quarries around the village are Abercwmeiddaw and Abercorris, Gaewern and Braichgoch. The narrow-gauge horse-drawn Upper Corris Tramway was part of the infrastructure which carried slate from the quarries to Machynlleth.

Corris Uchaf has a garden of Italian follies built by Mark and Muriel Bourne. A trust has been set up to care for the site.

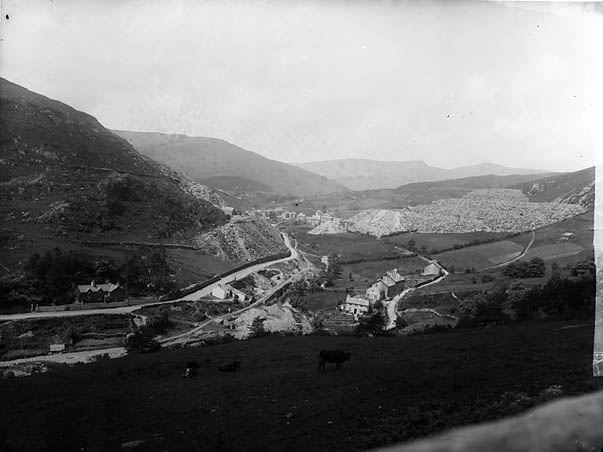
Corris Uchaf around 1885, with the Upper Corris Tramway running below the road and the tips of Abercwmmeidaw quarry on the right

Corris Uchaf is under the route of what is known as the Mach Loop, a low-fly zone for military aircraft with the military prefix reference LFA7.

In the 2010s, approximately 100 abandoned cars were discovered in a flooded chamber of Gaewern quarry nicknamed the "Cavern of Lost Souls".

== Government ==
The village has two representatives on Corris Community Council, currently Marit Olsson and Sharon Wells. The council is responsible for addressing the local community's needs and maintaining community resources.

Corris Uchaf is part of the Corris a Mawddwy electoral ward, currently represented at Gwynedd Council by John Pughe Roberts.

== Notable residents ==
- Writer Geraint Goodwin lived in the village in 1938 and 1939.
- Classical composer Otto Freudenthal lived in the village from 2006 to 2017.
