= Aberllefenni quarries =

Three slate quarries in north Wales

Aberllefenni
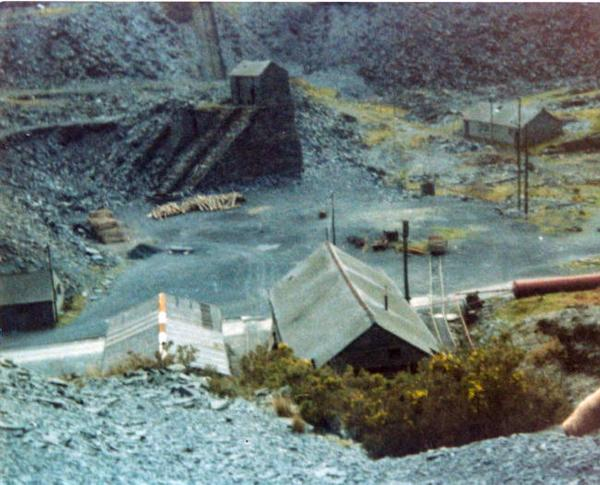
- Aberllefenni main level looking down from Foel Grochan, c.1979

- Location in Gwynedd

Location
- Location: near Aberllefenni, Merioneth, Wales, UK; 52.676°N 3.823°W grid reference SH 768 102

Production
- Products: Slate
- Type: mine

History
- Opened: 1500
- Closed: 2003

Aberllefenni quarry is the collective name of three slate mines, Foel Grochan, Hen Gloddfa (also known as Hen Chwarel) and Ceunant Ddu, located in Cwm Hengae, just to the west of Aberllefenni, Gwynedd, North Wales. It was the longest continually operated slate mine in the world until its closure in 2003. Foel Grochan is the mine on the north side of the valley, facing Ceunant Ddu and Hen Gloddfa on the south; all three were worked as a single concern throughout their history. Rock was mainly extracted underground, though all three mines had open pits as well.

== History ==
Aberllefenni quarry may have started operating as early as the 14th century. The earliest confirmed date is 1500 when the local house Plas Aberllefenni was roofed in slates from the mine. In the seventeenth century the Lloyd family owned the quarry, and it passed to the Campbell family in 1725. In 1806, John Davies gained control which passed to the executor of his estate, Pryce Jones, in 1824. It was Davies who first organised commercial quarrying at Aberllefenni around 1810. Although only 3 workers were employed in 1825, by 1854 the quarry was producing significant amounts of slate; that year the enormous "Alma" open chamber at the top of Foel Grochan was named after the Battle of the Alma.

By 1850, the quarry was owned by Colonel Robert Davies Jones, and was trading under the name Aberllefenni Slate Quarries. In 1873, the quarry appointed Robert Hughes as manager, and he quickly modernised working practices there. He installed new machinery in the extended mill, powered by a large waterwheel. That year the quarry employed 180 men.

By 1879, the quarry was employing 169 men and produced nearly 4700 tons of finished slate and slab. The number of employees peaked in 1890 at 190. Production fluctuated but was trending downwards during the 1890s and 1900s. In 1908, the number of employees fell below 100 and declined further to 71 in 1910. The First World War saw a downturn in production in the whole industry, including at Aberllefenni. After the war there was a short boom into the early 1920s, but then the price of slate began to fall.

By the early 1930s, the industry was in a deep depression, with a 3-day week being worked for part of 1933. The quarry was owned by A. Hamilton Pryce, who in 1935 leased it to Sir Henry Haydn Jones, owner of the Bryn Eglwys quarry near Abergynolwyn and the Talyllyn Railway that served it. There was some improvement during the late 1930s, with 140 workers employed in 1940, but the Second World War brought further drops in production, with the number of men fell to 40 in 1944.

After the war, the industry continued a slow decline, with industrial action closing the quarry for part of 1947. During the 1950s only about 40 men were working, all in Foel Grochan quarry. In 1956, brothers Gwilym and Dewi Lloyd took over the quarry under the name Wincilate Ltd. Rapid modernization and mechanisation of the quarry allowed it to continue to produce slate into the 1990s. Aberllefenni was the last working slate mine south of Blaenau Ffestiniog.

However, by 2002 it was no longer economical to extract slate at Aberllefenni and the mine closed in 2003. The slate mill continues to operate, processing slate imported from Blaenau Ffestiniog, Penrhyn and China. Small pieces of Aberllefenni slate are still available for name plates.

== Operations ==
Map of Aberllefenni area quarries and tramways

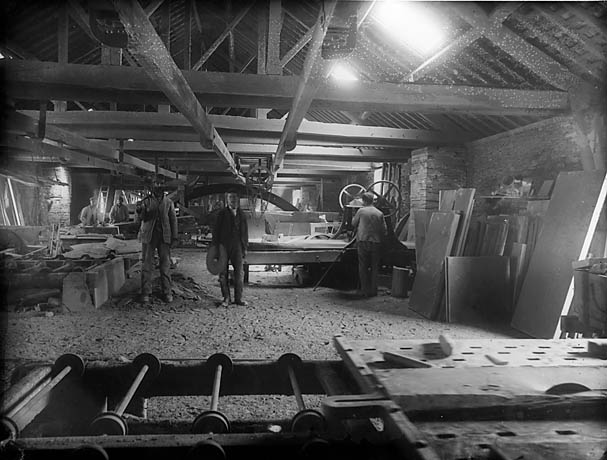
Inside the Aberllefenni mill around 1885

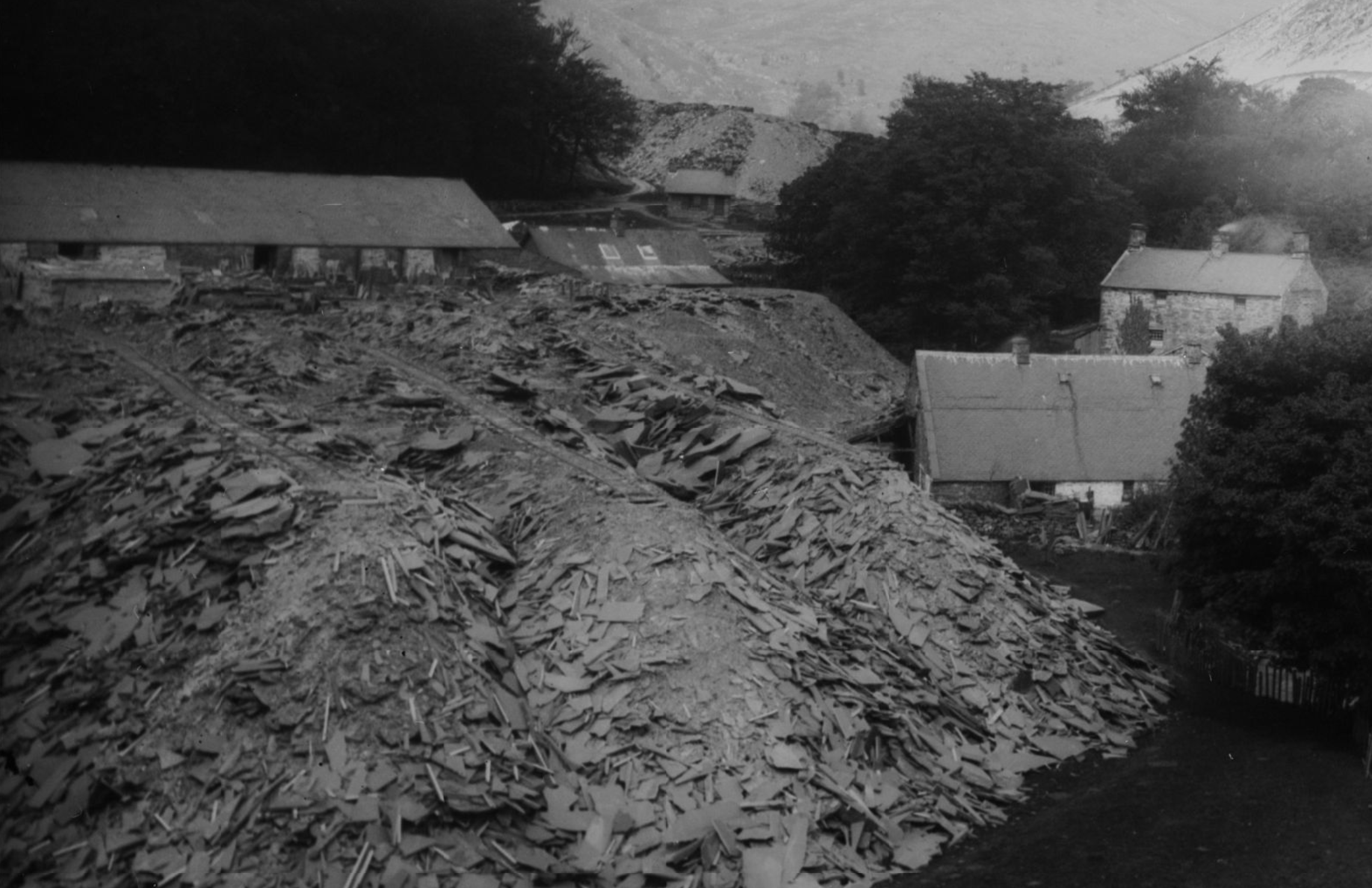
The rear of the main mill around 1885. The quarry office is to the right of the mill building with the Ratgoed Tramway passing behind

One of the reasons for Aberllefenni's continued use was the high quality of the slate extracted. There are two major veins of slate running parallel to each other through this region of mid-Wales, the Broad Vein and the Narrow Vein, the latter of which Aberllefenni extracted. The broad vein is of considerably poorer quality than the narrow vein, and the slate it produces is of little use in roofing slates or polished surfaces. Instead it was used in walls, fences and hardcore. The narrow vein was of much better quality and could be used in much higher quality applications and fetched higher prices.

Slate extracted from the narrow vein at Aberllefenni is deep blue and extremely hard and dense. It resists fine splitting, so most of the mines' product was large cut slabs rather than split roofing slates. Foel Grochan mine consists of eight near-horizontal tunnels at approximately 60 feet (18.3 m) vertical separation. These were bored into the valley side just to the north of the near-vertical narrow vein. Each tunnel connected to a large chamber from which the rock was extracted. These chambers ranged from 100 to 187 feet (30.5 to 57.0 m) in length with 24 to 30 feet (7.3 to 9.1 m) of rock left between the bottom of one chamber and the top of the next lower chamber. As more slate was extracted, several of the upper chambers were joined vertically to form an extremely large cavern known as Twll Golau which is open at the top.

== Transportation ==
From 1859 the quarries at Aberllefenni were connected to the Corris Railway, a narrow gauge railway which carried slate down the Dulas Valley to Machynlleth. There it was transferred to the standard gauge Cambrian Railways and shipped throughout Great Britain. The Aberllefenni quarries continued to dispatch slate on the Corris Railway until its closure in 1948.

After 1948, the short tramway connecting the quarries to the slate cutting shed at Aberllefenni continued in use. Although locomotives were used underground, the tramway was operated by horse haulage. This continued until the early 1960s, when a tractor replaced the horses. The tramway was removed in the late 1970s, being replaced with lorries and forklift trucks. Underground, the 2 ft 3 in (686 mm) gauge tramway continued in use, operated by battery electric locomotives until the end of working in 2003.
