= Braichgoch slate mine =

Former mine in Wales

Braichgoch
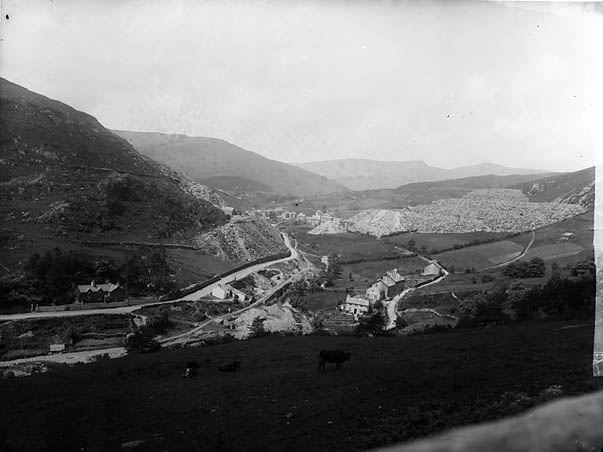
- View north toward Corris Uchaf. The waste tips of Gaewern are on the left

- Location in Powys
- Location: near Corris, Powys), Wales, United Kingdom; 52.6546°N 3.8505°W grid reference SH 74841 07964
- Products: Slate
- Type: Quarry
- Opened: 1787
- Active: 1787–1906; 1914–1971
- Closed: 1971

Braichgoch slate mine (often called Braich Goch quarry) was a large slate mine located in Corris Uchaf, north Wales. It operated continuously from 1787 until its closure in 1970 (some sources give 1971), apart from a hiatus in the 1900s. Most of the surface workings of the quarry were removed as part of a road widening and landscaping scheme in 1983.

Part of the underground mine workings are now open to the public as the King Arthur's Labyrinth tourist attraction (a fantasy journey into Arthurian legend taking place on one level of the mine) and the newly launched Corris Mine Explorers. Through the subterranean Corris Mine Explorer expeditions, the working lives of 19th-century Welsh miners can be seen firsthand. Equipment and discarded personal belongings remain untouched as relics of Welsh industry. The landscaped site above ground is also home to the Corris Craft Centre, a retail site from which several craft based shops operate.

== History ==
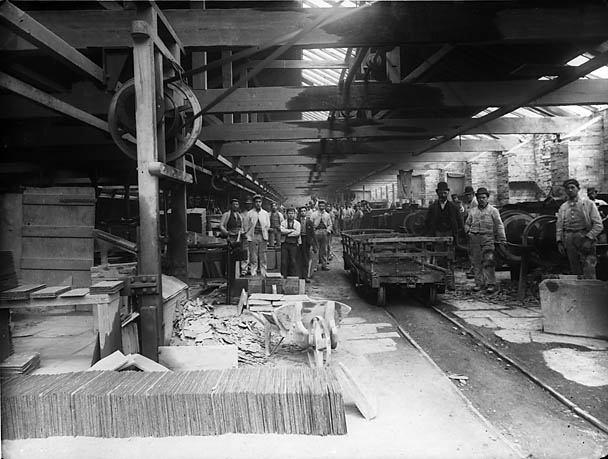
View inside the mill at Braichgoch around 1885

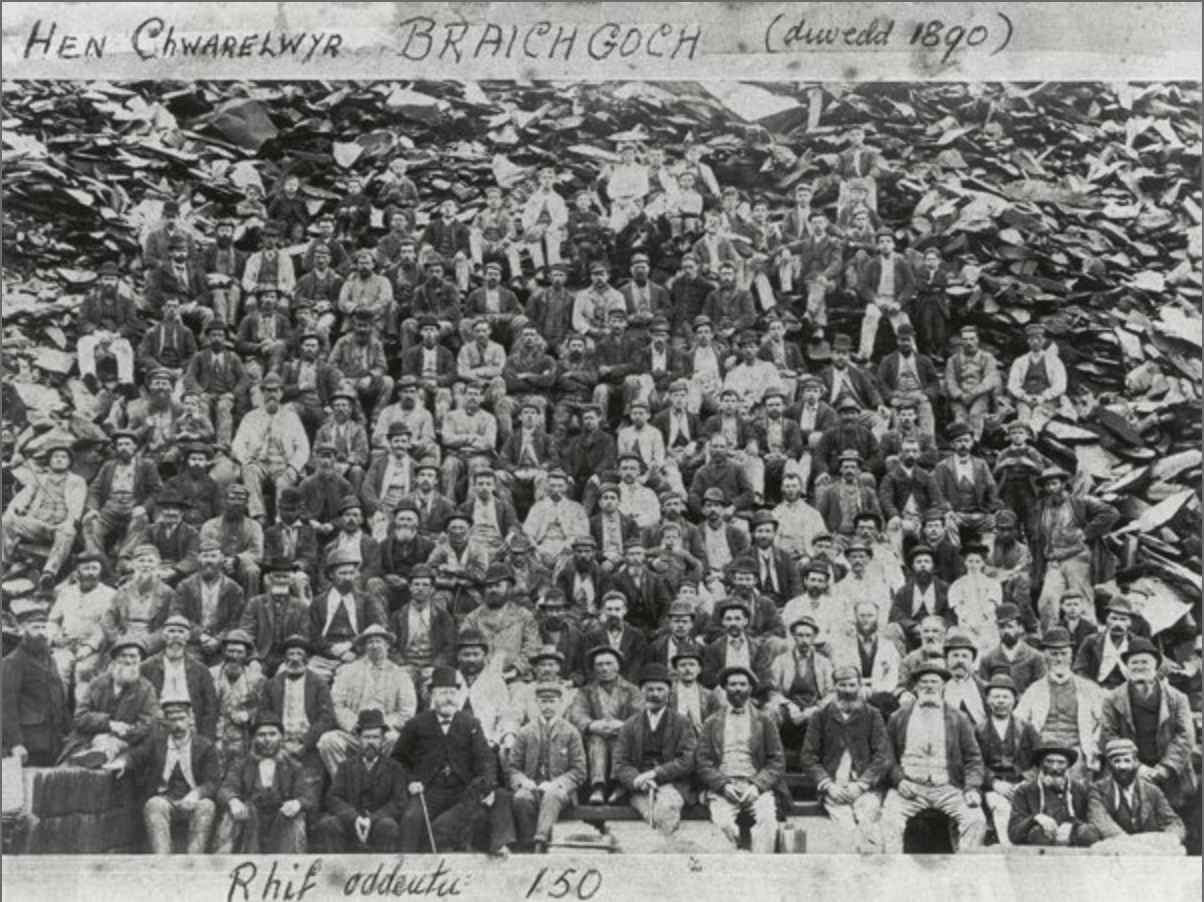
Quarrymen at Braich Goch quarry, 1890

Slate quarrying in the Corris district dates back to the 14th century when the Foel Grochan quarry at Aberllefenni is believed to have first been worked.

In 1787, David Williams leased the quarrying and mineral rights at Gaewern and Braich Goch from John Edwards, representing the Vane Estate. It is not certain when quarrying began on this land, but certainly slate extraction had started by 1812. The early mining took place at Gaewern, the northern of the two quarry areas, under the auspices of the Merionethshire Slate Company.

It was not until 1836 that quarrying began at Braich Goch proper, under the name of the North Wales Slate & Slab Company. By 1838, the lease, still from (now) Sir John Edwards, was expanded. In 1840 an incline was constructed to ease the movement of slate within the quarry. In 1843, the company surrendered the lease to Arthur Causton a civil engineer. He obtained a new lease directly from the Vanes Estate, thus removing the subleasing arrangement with John Edwards.

Meanwhile, the neighbouring Gaewern quarry was struggling and in 1848, the Merionethshire Slate Company was dissolved after the discovery of serious financial mismanagement. In 1853, the property was taken over by a company known as Alltgoed Consolls, and they restarted quarrying at Gaewern.

In 1851, new partners were brought into the North Wales Slate & Slab Company, which was reformed under the name Braich Goch Slate and Slab Company. However, an attempted flotation of the company failed to attract enough investors and as a result, the partners were brought out by John Rowlands, who owned Gaewern and Ratgoed quarries. At this time Braich Goch quarry included two waterwheels, six planning machines, nine sawing engines, 2 miles (3.2 km) of tramways and inclined planes, and six hand sawing machines, amongst other equipment.

By 1856, shareholders in the Alltgoed Consols were increasingly discontented due to the lack of profits from the three quarries.

In 1859, the Corris Tramroad opened, connecting the Corris district with Machynlleth and the River Dyfi beyond. The Birley family saw the opportunity of this new transportation route for improving the profitability of the local quarries and purchased the lease for Braich Goch from Rowlands, forming Braich Goch Slate Quarry Ltd. Rowlands continued with Gaewern, though without financial success and in 1868 sold it to the Talyllyn Slate Company. By that same year, employment at Braich Goch had grown to over 200 men.

In 1880, Braichgoch took over Gaewern quarry, and the two were worked as a single operation. By the mid-1890s over 6,000 tons of finished slate were being produced and over 350 workers were employed. Braichgoch was the largest slate quarry south of Blaenau Ffestiniog.

The downturn in demand for slate in the late 1890s led to Braichgoch closing in 1906. It was revived after the First World War and continued working sporadically until its final closure in 1971.

== Transport ==
Modern tourism at Braich Goch, 2019

By the mid-1840s, Braich Goch quarry maintained a wharf at Morben, with slate being shipped by horse cart. In 1859, the Corris Machynlleth & River Dovey Tramroad opened, connecting the slate quarries at Aberllefenni and Corris to river wharfs at Derwenlas and Morben. The Upper Corris Tramway branch of the tramroad served Braich Goch and the quarry leased a wharf at Cei Ward until 1869, when it opened a new transshipment wharf at Machynlleth where slate was loaded onto Cambrian Railways wagons.

The tramroad later became the Corris Railway, and it shipped the majority of the quarry's products until 1927.
