= Llwyngwern railway station =

Former railway station in Wales

Coordinates: 52.6230°N 3.8457°W

Llwyngwern was a station on the Corris Railway in Wales, built to serve the hamlet of Pantperthog and the residents of Plas Llwyngwern, a house where a daughter of the 5th Marquess of Londonderry lived with her husband. Although the Plas was in Montgomeryshire, the station was across the Afon Dulas in Merionethshire. The station was built at Llwyngwern, rather than at Pantperthog, because there is a very tight bend and a steep gradient on the railway at Pantperthog.

The station was opened on 1884, and closed with the end of passenger services in December 1930.

== Llwyngwern quarry branch ==
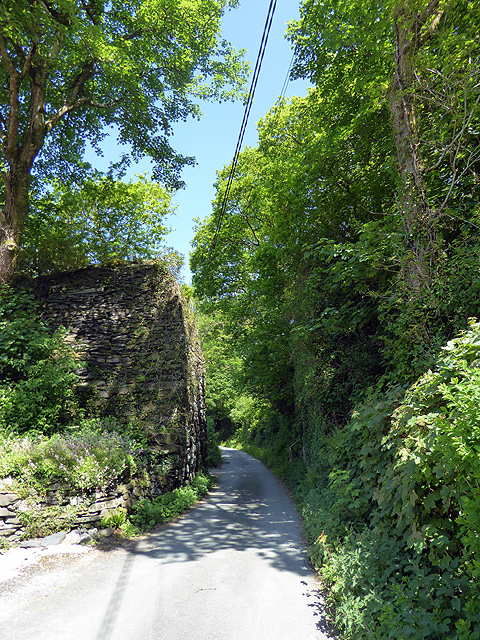
The abutments of a bridge that carried the Llwyngwern quarry tramway

Immediately to the south of the station was the junction between the main line of the Corris Railway and the horse-worked branch that served the Llwyngwern quarry, which is now the home of the Centre for Alternative Technology. The branch was built after 1887.

There was a short siding at the start of the branch, which was used to store wagons waiting to travel on the Corris Railway. The branch ran on top of a high slate embankment and crossed the Afon Dulas on a timber viaduct. On the east bank, another slate embankment took the branch over the Ffridd Gate to Pont Ifans road on a high bridge, and on to the bottom of the quarry. Here an incline led up to the quarry mill level, and a long tunnel ran to the bottom of the main quarry pit. Around 1927, the wooden bridge was declared unsafe and the branch was abandoned.

== Remains ==
Part of the station building survives as a bus shelter. The much degraded slate embankment can still be seen on the west bank of the Dulas.

Preceding station	Disused railways	Following station
Ffridd Gate	Corris Railway	Esgairgeiliog
