= Edward Thomas (locomotive) =

Preserved British steam locomotive

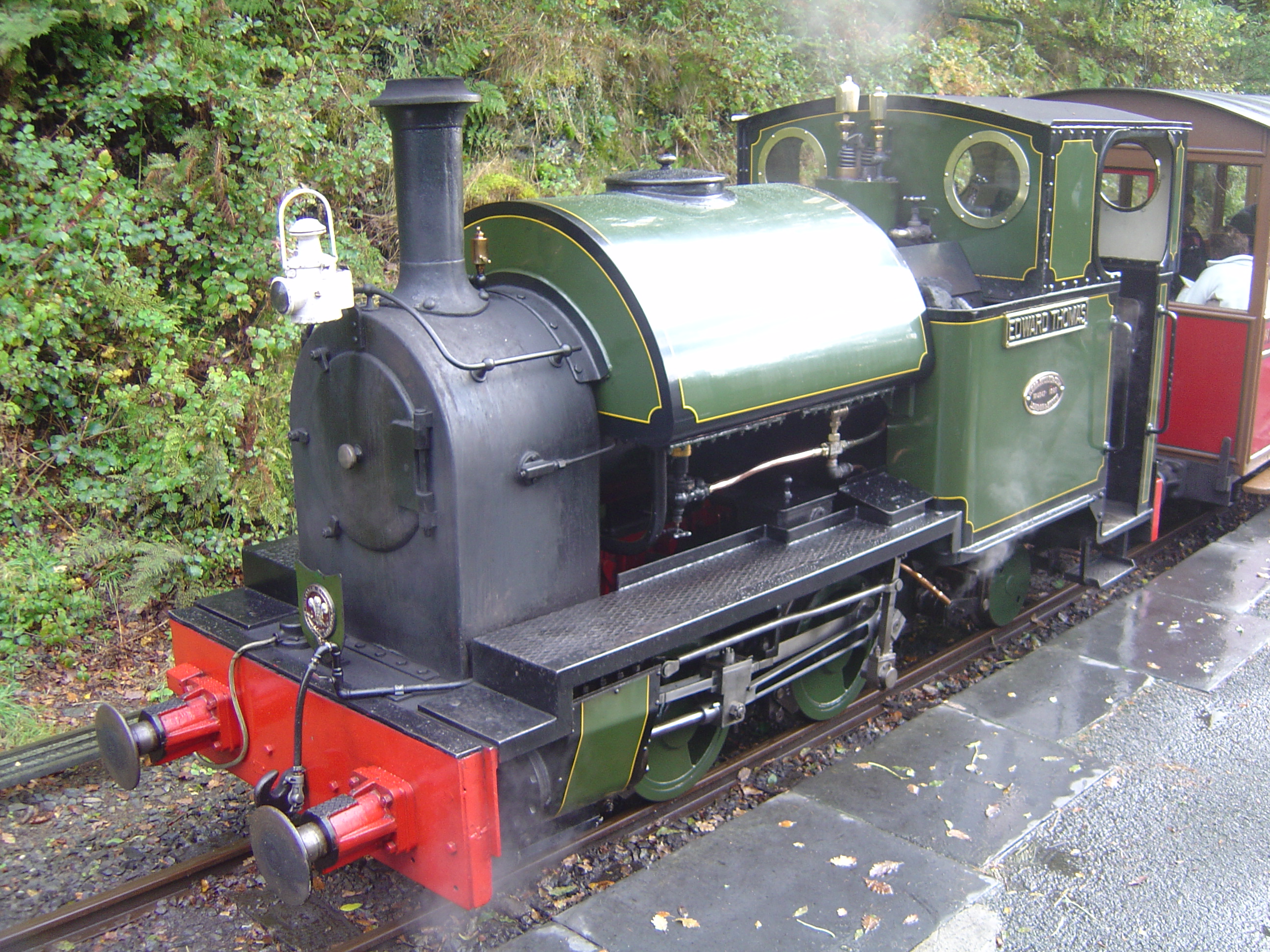
- Edward Thomas at Abergynolwyn railway station
Type and origin
- Power type: Steam
- Builder: Kerr, Stuart & Co. Ltd.
- Serial number: 4047
- Model: Tattoo class
- Build date: 1921
Specifications
- Configuration
  - Whyte: 0-4-2ST
- Gauge: 2 ft 3 in (686 mm)
- Driver dia.: 2 ft 0 in (610 mm)
- Trailing dia.: 1 ft 4 in (406 mm)
- Wheelbase: Coupled: 3 ft 0 in (0.91 m); Loco: 7 ft 6 in (2.29 m)
- Length: 16 ft 8 in (5.08 m)
- Loco weight: 9 long tons 5 cwt (20,700 lb or 9.4 t) (10.4 short tons)
- Boiler pressure: 160 lbf/in^{2} (1.10 MPa)
- Cylinders: Two, outside
- Cylinder size: 7 1/8 in × 12 in (181 mm × 305 mm)
Performance figures
- Tractive effort: 3,450 lbf (15.35 kN)
Career
- Operators: Corris Railway; Great Western Railway; British Railways; Talyllyn Railway
- Numbers: CR/GWR/BR/TR: 4

Edward Thomas is a narrow gauge steam locomotive. Built by Kerr Stuart & Co. Ltd. at the California Works, Stoke-on-Trent in 1921, it was delivered new to the Corris Railway where it ran until 1948. After that railway closed, the locomotive was brought to the Talyllyn Railway in 1951, then restored, and remains in working order at the heritage railway. It has carried the operating number 4 under four successive owners.

== History ==
=== Corris Railway ===
The Corris Railway was a 2 ft 3 in (686 mm) gauge tramway built in 1859, which ran from Machynlleth north to Corris and on to Aberllefenni to serve local slate quarries. The railway company owned three locomotives, built in 1878; by the end of World War I all three were in poor condition, and the railway ordered a fourth, a modified version of Kerr Stuart's 0-4-2ST "Tattoo" class, in 1921. It initially struggled with the workload on the Corris and was provided with a new boiler with a greater number of tubes in 1928.

The Corris Railway was taken over by the Great Western Railway in 1930, after which duties were shared between No.4 and the surviving original loco, No. 3. By late 1947 No. 4 was out of service needing a major overhaul, and as a result never worked under British Railways following nationalisation in 1948, as the Corris closed on 20 August that year. It then was left under tarpaulin at the rear of the Corris Railway Machynlleth station, along with No. 3.

=== Talyllyn Railway ===
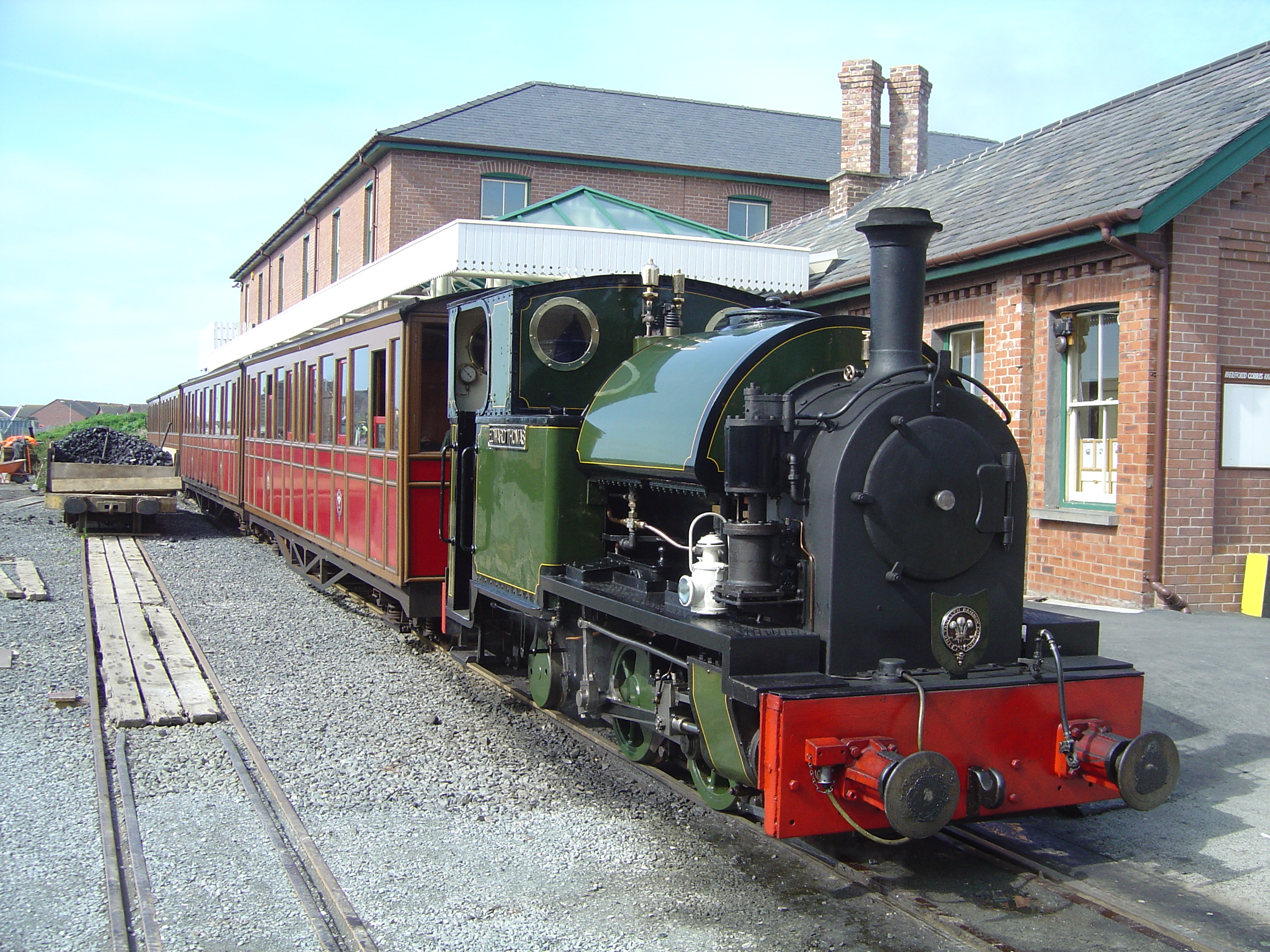
Edward Thomas at Tywyn Wharf station

The Talyllyn Railway was built in 1865 and ran from Towyn (now called Tywyn) to the slate quarries of Bryn Eglwys, only a few miles from Corris. It was built to the same gauge as the Corris Railway, but unlike that line used steam traction from the start. The line and quarries were bought by Sir Henry Haydn Jones, the local member of parliament, in 1911. The venture made little money, but despite the closure of the quarries in 1946, Haydn Jones continued to operate the railway at a loss until his death in 1950.

That same year, a group of enthusiasts, including the author Tom Rolt, had looked at the possibility of operating the railway on a volunteer basis. With the agreement of Haydn Jones' widow a deal was made, and control of the railway passed to the newly formed preservation society. One of the major problems facing the railway was the lack of motive power; the railway owned two locomotives, the first of which, Talyllyn, had been out of service for some years, and the second, Dolgoch, was in need of a major overhaul. The society therefore approached British Railways to attempt to purchase the two remaining Corris locos, and successfully negotiated to purchase them at £25 each (equivalent to £992 in 2023).

No. 4 had been unnamed on the Corris under Great Western ownership (it has been suggested that it carried the name Tattoo prior to 1930 but photographs suggest otherwise). Upon arrival on the Talyllyn Railway it was named Edward Thomas after the former manager of the railway, though another suggested name had been James Swinton Spooner, after the engineer who had built the line. Although it was not realised at the time, Edward Thomas, in his role as Secretary of the Aberllefenni Slate and Slab Quarries Co after 1935, had played an important role in helping keep the Corris Railway open and so ensuring the survival of the locomotive.

Along with No. 3, it kept its Corris number, giving both locos the unusual distinction of carrying the same number though the ownership of four different railway companies (the Corris, Great Western, British Railways and Talyllyn Railway). Because both railways were built to the unusual gauge of 2 ft 3 in (686 mm) it was relatively easy to adapt the Corris locomotives to work on the Talyllyn Railway. Upon arriving, No.4 was in need of a major overhaul but was unserviceable as the Talyllyn Railway were struggling for money. John Alcock, the chairman of the Hunslet Engine Company, was a member of the Preservation Society and had No. 4 overhauled free of charge at his works. Like Sir Haydn when it arrived at the Talyllyn Railway it had no buffers, so was subsequently fitted with them.

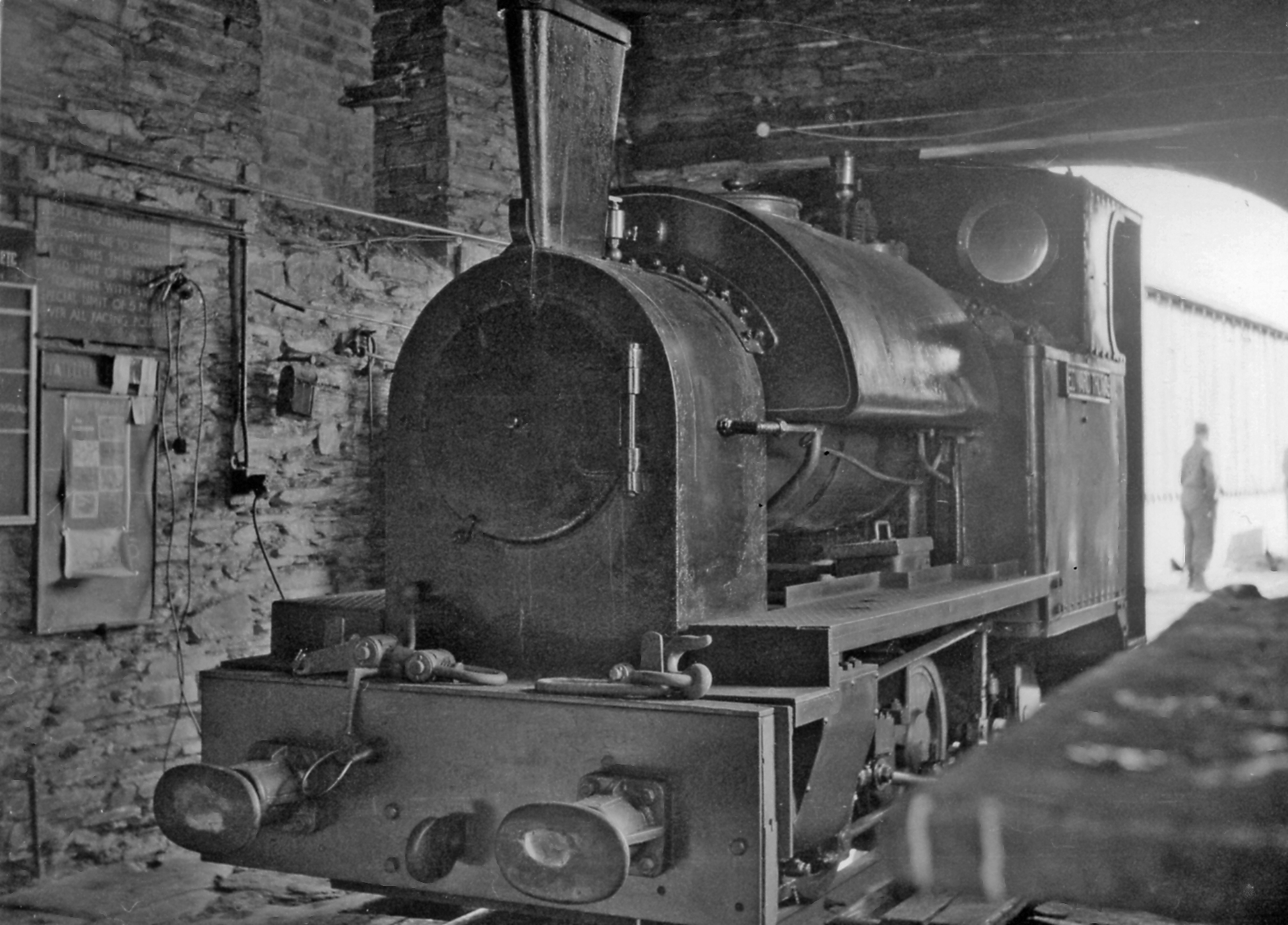
Edward Thomas, fitted with its Giesl Ejector in 1962

In 1958, Dr Giesl-Gieslingen approached British Railways to offer a free trial of his Giesl ejector. When this offer was turned down, the inventor made the same offer to the preserved Talyllyn Railway in Wales, and Edward Thomas was fitted with one. Although a coal saving of 40% was officially announced at the time, this has since been disputed by the railway's chief engineer. The ejector was removed in 1969, and no difference in coal consumption was found. The ejector is now on display in the Narrow Gauge Railway Museum at Tywyn.

Edward Thomas has been painted red, as Peter Sam, but as of 2010 is running in the standard Talyllyn Railway livery of deep bronze green lined with black borders and yellow lining.

== Rebirth of Corris ==
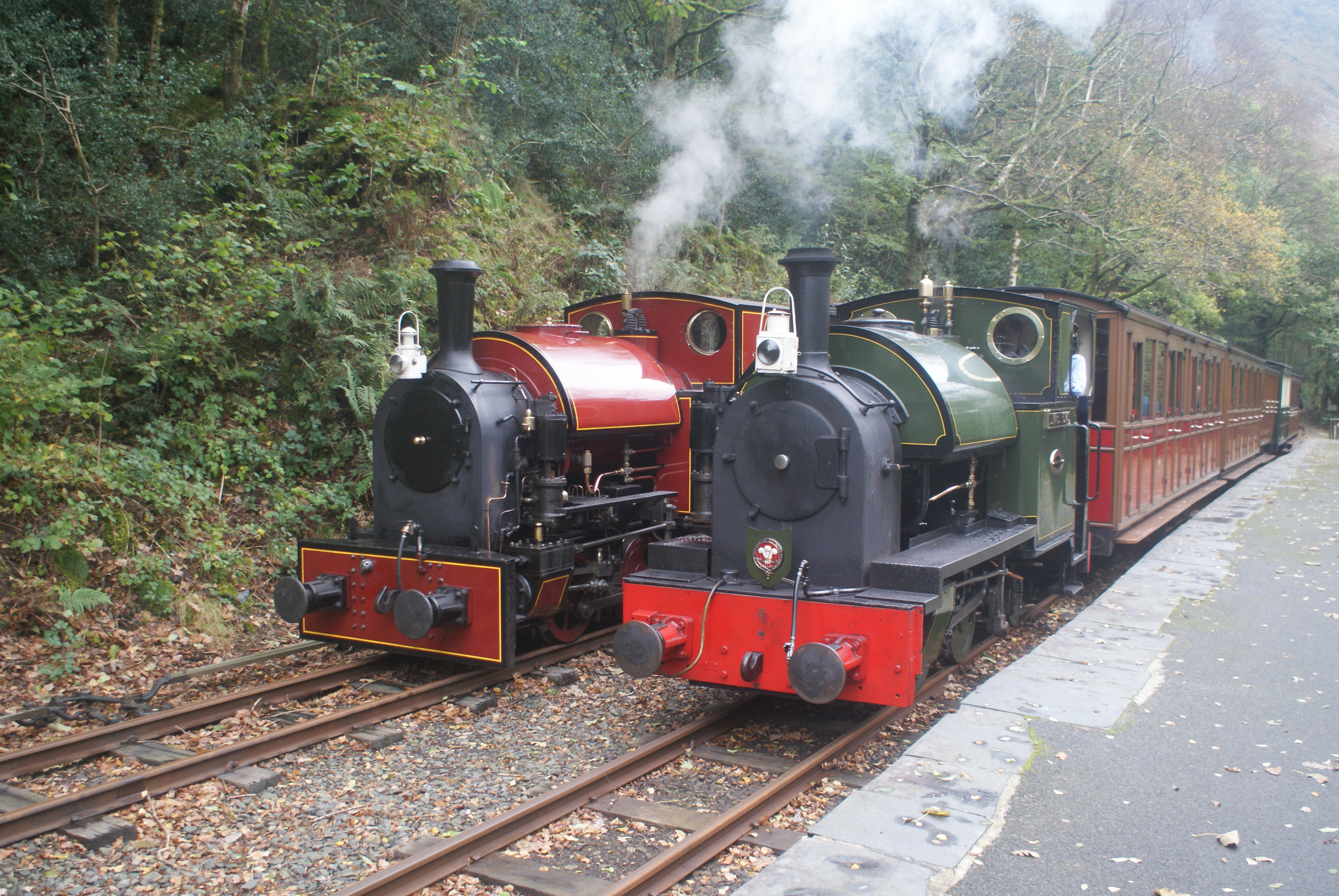
New-build Corris No. 7 (left), and Edward Thomas, during a visit of the former to the Talyllyn Railway.

Reconstruction of the Corris Railway commenced in the 1970s and in October 1996 No. 4 returned there for a brief visit to run demonstration trains. On 17 May 2005 a new-build Tattoo class locomotive, similar in design to No. 4, arrived on the Corris Railway where it became No. 7, and currently hauls passenger trains there. In 2021, to mark No. 4's centenary, it returned to Corris in August to work its first passenger trains on that railway since 1930, followed by a visit of Corris No. 7 to the Talyllyn Railway.

== In fiction ==
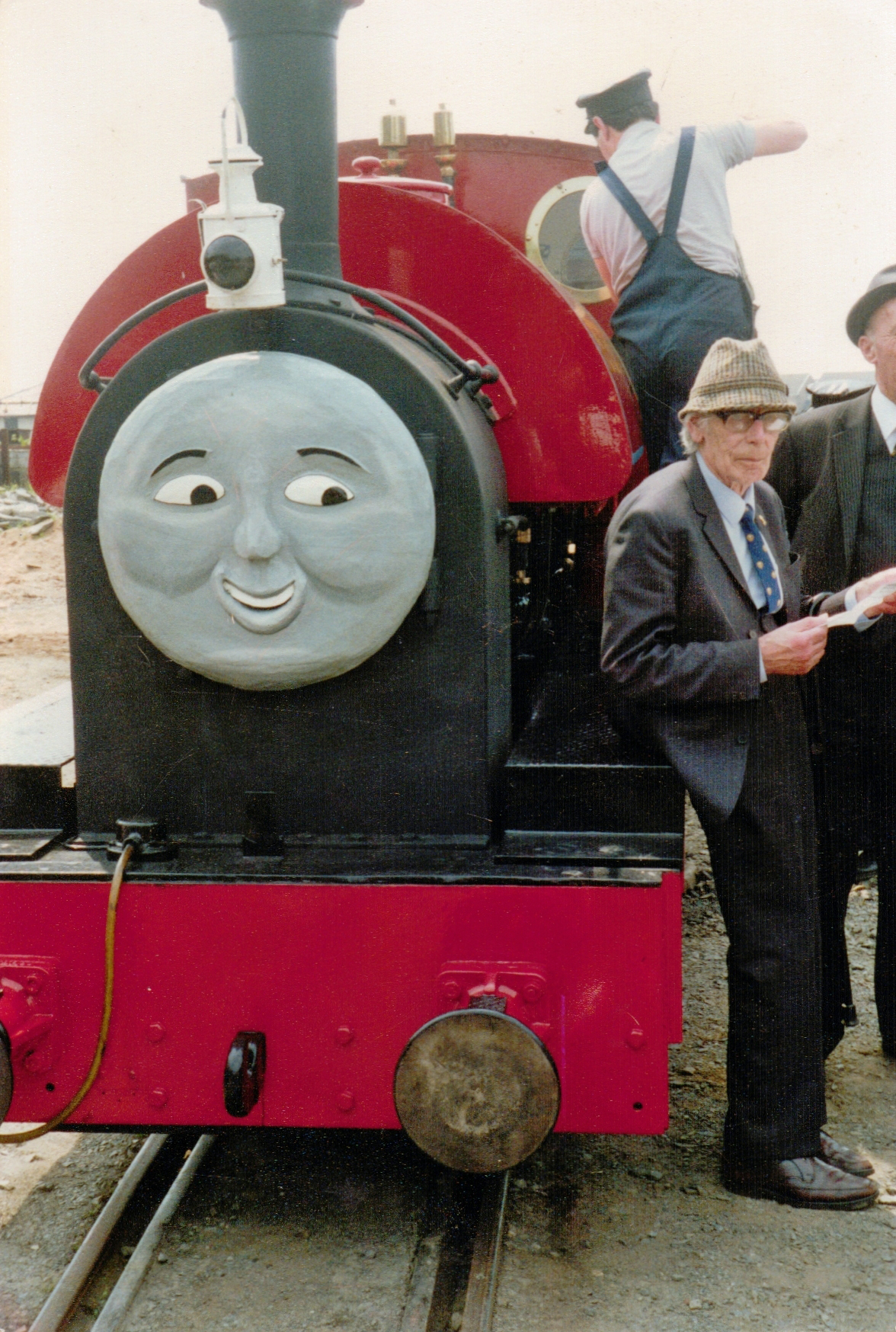
Edward Thomas in 1988, in the guise of "Peter Sam", with the fictional character's creator, Rev W Awdry

The character Peter Sam in The Railway Series books by the Wilbert Awdry and the Television Series Thomas & Friends is based on Edward Thomas.

== Bibliography ==
- Bate, John (2001). The Chronicles of Pendre Sidings. RailRomances. ISBN 1-900622-05-X.
- Boyd, James I.C. (1965). Narrow Gauge Railways in Mid Wales. Oakwood Press. ISBN 0-85361-024-X.
- Cozens, Lewis (1987) [First published 1949]. The Corris Railway. Reprinted by Corris Railway Society.
- Davies, F. K.; Firth, J. M.; Lucking, J. H.; Thomas, R. E.; Allcock, N. J.; Sterndale, A. C.; Barrie, D. S. M.; Reed, P. J. T.; Mountford, E. R. (April 1966). White, D. E. (ed.). The Locomotives of the Great Western Railway, part ten: Absorbed Engines, 1922–1947. RCTS. ISBN 0-901115-20-7.
- Holmes, Alan (2009). Talyllyn Revived. The Talyllyn Railway. ISBN 978-0-900317-07-1.
- Potter, David (1990). The Talyllyn Railway. David St John Thomas. ISBN 0-946537-50-X.
- The Corris Railway Society (1988). A Return to Corris. Avon-Anglia Publications. ISBN 0-905466-89-6.
