= Sir Haydn =

Sir Haydn may refer to

- Sir Henry Haydn Jones (1863-1950) - Welsh politician
- Sir Haydn (locomotive) - a steam locomotive named after Sir Henry Haydn Jones.
