= Machynlleth Town railway station =

Former railway station in Wales

Coordinates: 52.5926°N 3.8547°W

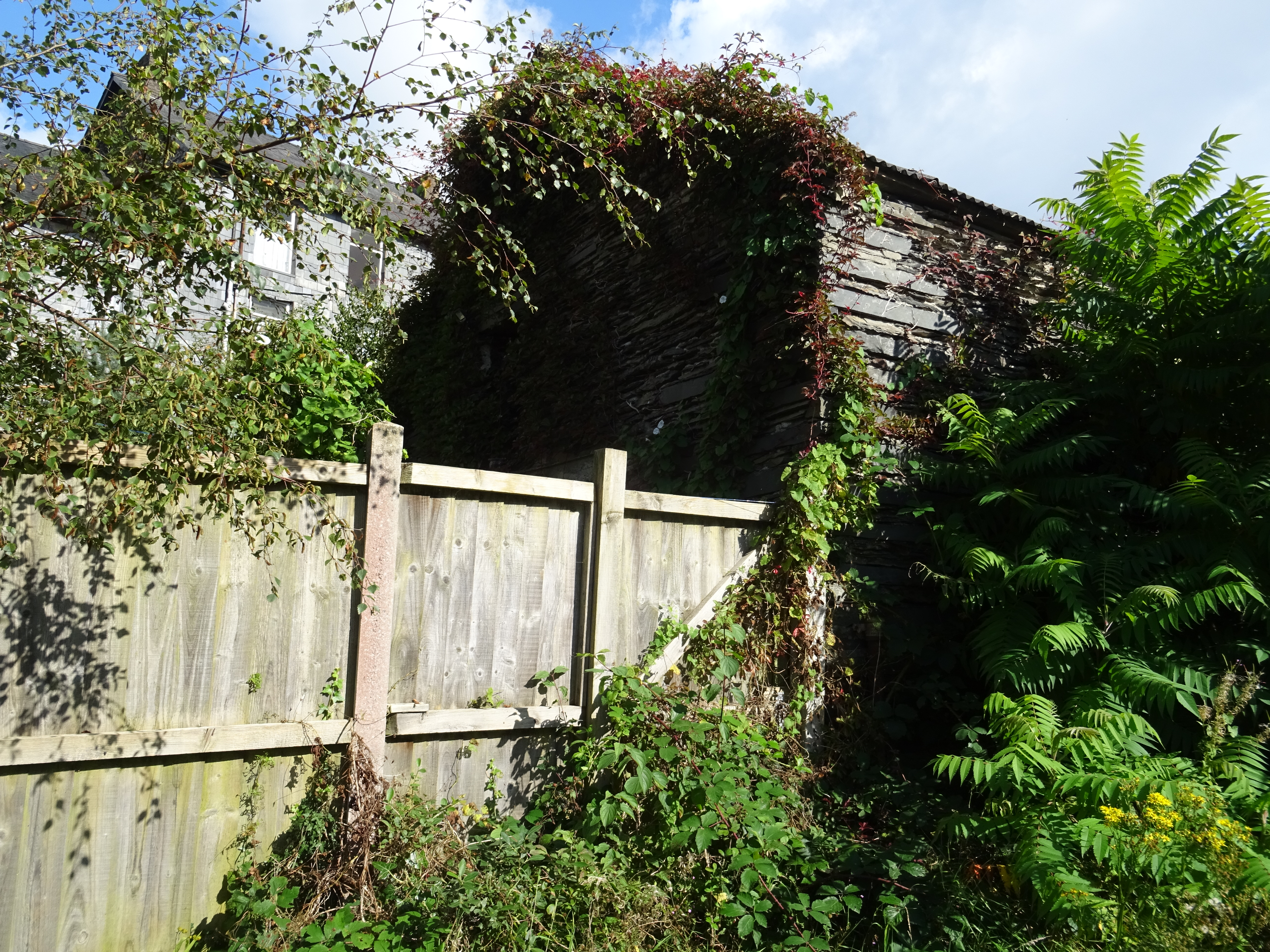
The stable building that still remains at the end of Brickfield Street.

The tramroad to Machynlleth Town station passed under the Cambrian Railways in the bricked-up arch on the right (pictured in 1982). The arch was reopened in 2024 as part of a foot and cycle path.

Machynlleth Town was a station on the Corris Railway in Wales. It was the original passenger and goods station for the town of Machynlleth. It was opened around 1860, and last used just before 1878. The station was not named; "Machynlleth Town" is used to distinguish it from the later Machynlleth station.

== History ==
In 1859, the 2 ft 3 in (686 mm) gauge Corris, Machynlleth & River Dovey Tramroad was opened to bring slate from the quarries around Corris and Aberllefenni to the riverside quays at Derwenlas and Morben. It passed through the Garsiwn, the western part of Machynlleth, and a stable building was built alongside the tramway, just west of Heol y Doll. The allowed the horses that hauled the trains to be switched for the level section south to Morben, or the uphill journey towards Corris. As this was the main stopping point for Machynlleth, a walled compound was also built to allow goods to be loaded and unloaded from trains.

The tramway unofficially allowed passengers to ride on its trains from at least 1860 and Machynlleth Town was the southernmost passenger station on the line. The passenger service was formalised in 1872 with the introduction of timetabled horse-hauled trains, running from Machynlleth Town to Corris. This service was technically illegal as the Corris Railway Act 1864 (27 & 28 Vict. c. ccxxv) forbade the carriage of passengers.

In January 1863, the standard gauge Newtown and Machynlleth Railway was opened, terminating at a new station about half a mile north of Machynlleth Town. Later that year a slate transshipment platform was built at the new station allowing slate to be loaded from the Corris onto standard-gauge wagons. Additional platforms were built there during the 1860s. The Corris Railway Act 1864 allowed the Corris Railway Company to abandon the section of the tramway south from Machynlleth Town to the river wharves at Morben, though this section wasn't lifted until 1869. The remaining section from Machynlleth Town station to the standard gauge station remained in use into the 1870s.

In 1874 a new stable and goods warehouse was built beside the transshipment platforms. Machynlleth Town station was closed sometime between 1874 and 1880.

== Remains ==
The tramway stable building and part of one of the walls of the goods compound remain standing in 2024.

Preceding station	Disused railways	Following station
Derwenlas	Corris Railway	Machynlleth
