= Corris Railway =

Narrow gauge railway in Wales

Coordinates: 52.64728°N 3.84313°W

Corris Railway Rheilffordd Corris

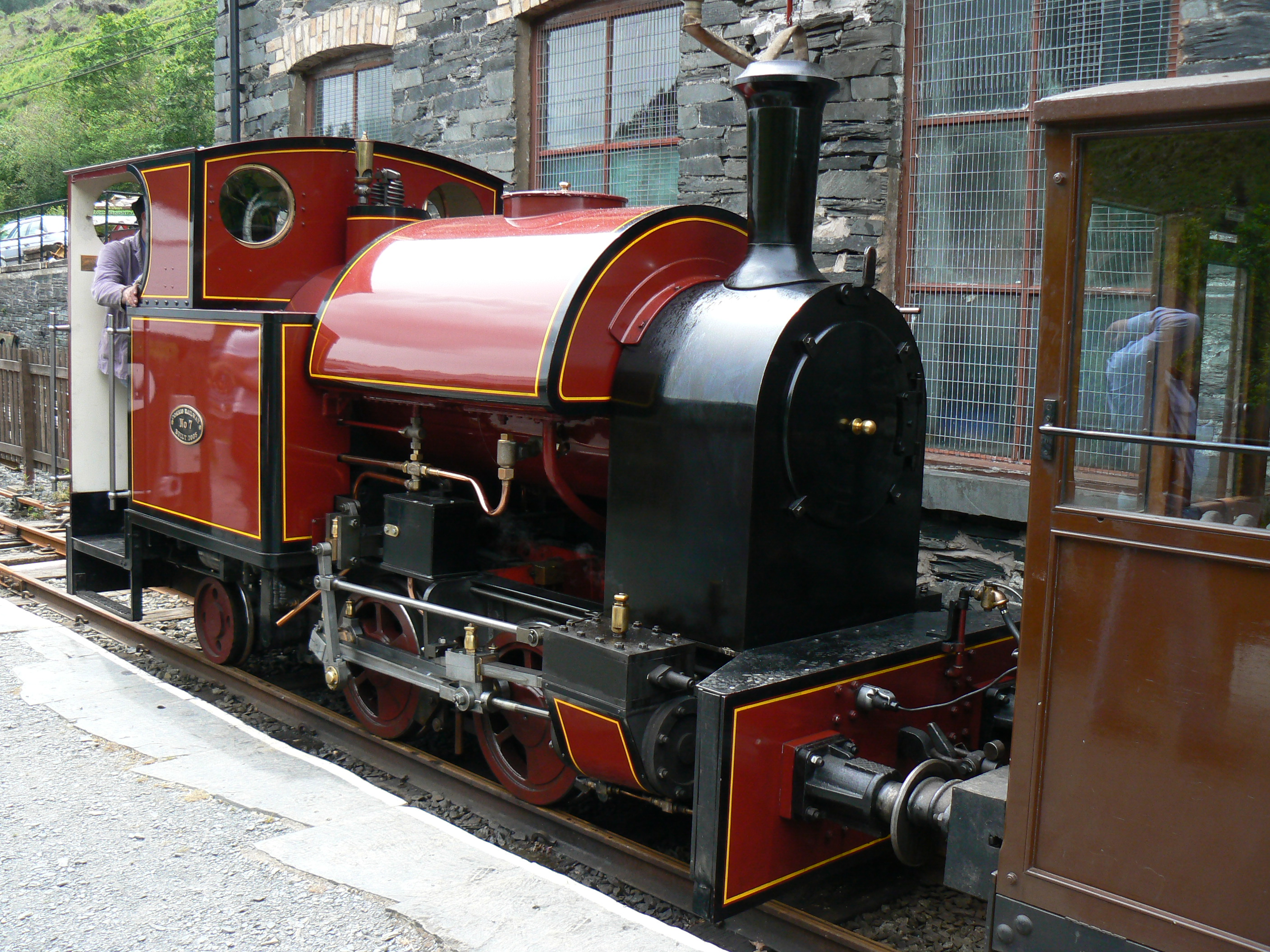
- Locomotive No. 7 at Maespoeth in 2007
- Locale: Mid-Wales
- Terminus: (Original) Machynlleth & Aberllefenni (Current) Maespoeth & Corris
- Connections: Ratgoed Tramway at Aberllefenni; Cambrian Railways at Machynlleth; Assorted minor quarry tramways

Commercial operations
- Name: Corris Railway Company
- Built by: Corris, Machynlleth & River Dovey Tramroad
- Original gauge: 2 ft 3 in (686 mm)

Preserved operations
- Owned by: Corris Railway Company Ltd
- Operated by: Corris Railway Society
- Stations: 2
- Length: 58 chains (1,170 m) (operational)
- Preserved gauge: 2 ft 3 in (686 mm)

Commercial history
- Opened: 1859 onwards (as below)
- 1859: Opened to freight (horse-drawn)
- 1878: Locomotive operation commenced
- 1883: Opened to passengers
- 1931: Closed to passengers
- 1948: Closed to freight

Preservation history
- 1966: Supporters' group formed
- 1970: Corris Railway Museum opened
- 1971: Demonstration track laid
- 1981: Maespoeth shed purchased
- 2002: Passenger services restored
- 2005: Steam motive power restored
- Headquarters: Maespoeth Junction

Website
- https://www.corris.co.uk

The Corris Railway (Welsh: Rheilffordd Corris) is a narrow gauge railway based in Corris on the border between Merionethshire (now Gwynedd) and Montgomeryshire (now Powys) in Mid-Wales.

The line opened in 1859 as a horse tramway, running from quays on the River Dyfi at Morben and Derwenlas, through the town of Machynlleth and then following the Dulas Valley north to Corris and on to Aberllefenni. Branches served the slate quarries at Corris Uchaf, Aberllefenni, the isolated quarries around Ratgoed and quarries along the length of the Dulas Valley. In 1878, the railway was rebuilt and steam locomotives were introduced. It was taken over by the Great Western Railway in 1929 and closed in 1948.

A preservation society was formed in 1966, initially opening a museum at Corris. A short section of line between Corris and Maespoeth was re-opened to passengers in 2002. The railway now operates as a tourist attraction. Two new steam locomotives have been built for the railway, in 2005 and 2023. Two of the original locomotives and some of the original rolling stock are preserved on the nearby Talyllyn Railway.

The railway has the unusual gauge of 2 ft 3 in (686 mm) which was shared by only three other public railways in the United Kingdom: the Talyllyn Railway and the short-lived Plynlimon and Hafan Tramway in Mid Wales, and the Campbeltown and Machrihanish Light Railway in Scotland.

== History ==
=== Commercial history ===
==== Precursor schemes: 1850 to 1858 ====
Corris Machynlleth and River Dovey Railway Act 1852
- Act of Parliament
- Parliament of the United Kingdom
- Long title: An Act for making a Railway or Tramroad from the Aberllefenny Slate Quarries in the Parish of Talyllyn in the County of Merioneth to the River Dovey in the Parish of Towyn in the same County, with Branches therefrom; and for other Purposes.
- Citation: 15 & 16 Vict. c. clxvi

Dates
- Royal assent: 1 July 1852

Text of statute as originally enacted

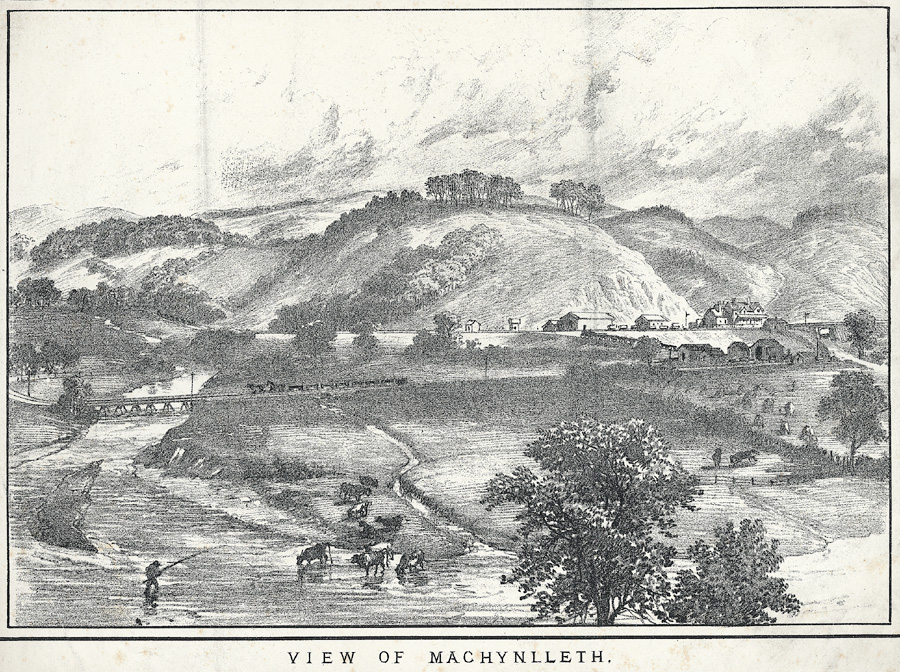
Lithograph showing a horse-drawn train on the Corris Railway crossing the Dovey Bridge, probably drawn in the late 1860s

Before 1859, slate from the quarries at Corris, Corris Uchaf and Aberllefenni was hauled by horse-drawn carts and sledges to wharves on the banks of the River Dyfi. The first proposal to construct a railway connecting the quarries to the coast came in August 1850, when the owners of the Aberllefenni, Abercorris, Gaewern and Hengae quarries met with engineer Arthur Causton to propose the Abercorris and Aberdovey Railway. By November 1850, the name had changed to the Corris, Machynlleth & River Dovey Railway or Tramroad which was planned to run down the Dulas Valley and then along the north shore of the Dyfi past Pennal to Pant Eidal, near the later main-line Gogarth Halt. A bill was submitted in early 1851, withdrawn, then resubmitted in December. The bill specified the tramroad's gauge as 2 ft 2 1/2 in (673 mm); due to the narrow gauge selected, the House of Lords committee imposed a restriction in the bill that forbade the use of locomotives.

This 1851 scheme was authorised in the Corris Machynlleth and River Dovey Railway Act 1852 (15 & 16 Vict. c. clxvi) but was not constructed, and was followed by two further proposals in the early 1850s. Following the plans for a 4 ft 8 1/2 in (1,435 mm) standard gauge railway along the Dyfi valley, these early proposals were shelved.

Corris, Machynlleth, and River Dovey Tramroad Act 1858
- Act of Parliament
- Parliament of the United Kingdom
- Long title: An Act for making a Tramroad from the Aberllefenny Slate Quarries in the Parish of Talyllun in the County of Merioneth to the River Dovey in the Parish of Llanfihangel-Geneu'r-Glyn in the County of Cardigan, with Brandies therefrom; and for other Purposes.
- Citation: 21 & 22 Vict. c. xcv

Dates
- Royal assent: 12 July 1858

In December 1857, a fourth bill was set before Parliament to create the Corris, Machynlleth and River Dovey Tramroad (CM&RDT). This was similar to the 1851 scheme, except that it proposed to cross the Dyfi near Machynlleth and then follow the south bank of the river, and proposed a tramway from the "machine house" (i.e. the slate mill) at Aberllefenni, down to the wharf at "Cae Goch on the River Dovey" (Cae Goch was near to the later main line Glandyfi station). The gauge specified for the tramroad was increased to 2 ft 3 in (686 mm), and the same restriction forbidding locomotives was imposed. This bill was passed on 12 July 1858, becoming the Corris, Machynlleth, and River Dovey Tramroad Act 1858 (21 & 22 Vict. c. xcv).

==== The Tramroad Era: 1858 to 1878 ====
After more than eight years of proposals, the 1859 scheme was the one that was built. Construction proceeded quickly, and by April 1859 the tramroad opened between Machynlleth and Corris. The section from Aberllefenni to Corris was built later that year. The section from Machynlleth to Morben was opened later. It is thought that the tramroad never extended beyond Morben.

On 3 January 1863, the standard gauge Newtown and Machynlleth Railway had opened, followed on 1 July of the same year by the Aberystwith and Welsh Coast Railway's (A&WCR) line from Machynlleth to Borth. These two lines became part of the Cambrian Railways by August 1865. The opening of the standard gauge line to Borth made the section of the CM&RDT from Machynlleth to Morben obsolete. It was much easier to transship slates to the main line at Machynlleth and most of the lower section of the tramway was abandoned, probably in 1869.

Corris Railway Act 1864
- Act of Parliament
- Parliament of the United Kingdom
- Long title: An Act to authorize the Corris, Machynlleth, and River Dovey Tramroad Company to make a new Railway; to abandon Part of their existing Undertaking; to amend their Act; and for other Purposes.
- Citation: 27 & 28 Vict. c. ccxxv

Dates
- Royal assent: 25 July 1864

Other legislation
- Amends: Corris, Machynlleth, and River Dovey Tramroad Act 1858

Text of statute as originally enacted

In 1862, a new bill was deposited, seeking to extend the Upper Corris Tramway to iron ore mines at Tir Stent, near the pub at Cross Foxes. The bill also sought powers to raise further capital for the tramroad and allow the use of locomotives. But the directors of the A&WCR objected and the bill failed. Another similar bill was deposited in December 1863, and again the A&WCR opposed it. This time, however, they withdrew their objection; the CM&RDT company had been acquired by Thomas Savin, who was the principal contractor in the construction of the tramroad, and Savin had offered to sell the company to the A&WCR. The second bill passed on 25 July as the Corris Railway Act 1864 (27 & 28 Vict. c. ccxxv); it formally converted the tramroad to a railway changing the company's name to the Corris Railway Company, allowed the use of steam locomotives and allowed the abandonment of the section west of Ffynnon Garsiwn in Machynlleth.

In 1863, a new transshipment wharf was built at Machynlleth to allow slate to be loaded from CM&RDT waggons into standard gauge wagons. Passenger and goods trains continued to run to Machynlleth Town station on the west side of Machynlleth, with some slate trains continuing to the wharfs at Morben.

It took until the 1870s for work to begin to upgrade the Corris Railway to a standard where locomotives could be used. The original tramroad was laid with light bridge rail suitable for waggons to traverse as they were pulled by horses. These rails would not support the weight of much heavier steam locomotives. Although the Corris Railway Act 1864 did not permit passengers to be carried, passengers were carried from at least 1860, and a timetabled passenger service was introduced in 1872. In 1874, a new goods warehouse and horse stable was built besides the transshipment wharves at Machynlleth, this was later converted to form the first passenger station here.

In 1878, control of the railway passed to the Imperial Tramways Company of London. The new owners ordered new passenger carriages for the railway. They also appointed Joseph R. Dix, son of the main-line stationmaster at Machynlleth, as Manager in succession to David Owen.

==== The Dix Years: 1879 to 1907 ====
Corris Railway Act 1880
- Act of Parliament
- Parliament of the United Kingdom
- Long title: An Act to amend the Corris, Machynlleth, and River Dovey Tramroad Act, 1858, and the Corris Railway Act, 1864, and to confer further powers upon the Corris Railway Company; and for other purposes.
- Citation: 43 & 44 Vict. c. liv

Dates
- Royal assent: 9 July 1880

Text of statute as originally enacted

Corris Railway Act 1883
- Act of Parliament
- Parliament of the United Kingdom
- Long title: An Act to enable the Corris Railway Company to use their Railways for Passenger Traffic and for other purposes.
- Citation: 46 & 47 Vict. c. xxxiv

Dates
- Royal assent: 18 June 1883

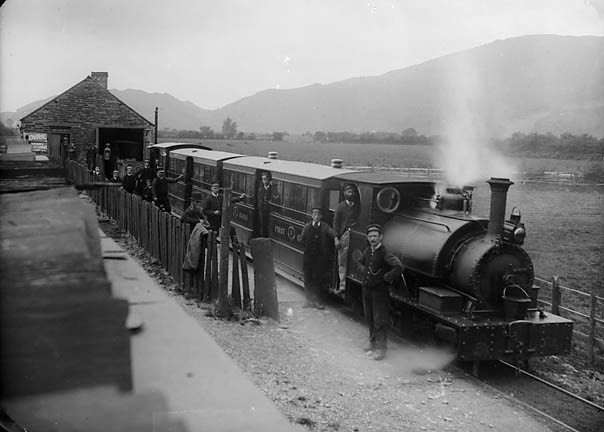
Locomotive No.1 with a train at Machynlleth, in the 1890s

Two new acts, the Corris Railway Act 1880 (43 & 44 Vict. c. liv) and the Corris Railway Act 1883 (46 & 47 Vict. c. xxxiv) were obtained which adjusted the tolls on the railway and permitted the carriage of passengers. The second of these acts was necessary because the owners of the quarries served by the railway objected that passenger trains would interfere with their mineral traffic. Initially the railway ran a test passenger service on the local roads; this proved to be so popular that they were able to pass the act of Parliament over the opposition of the quarry owners. It was also the first instance of a long history of the Corris Railway operating passenger road services in the area.

In December 1878 the first steam locomotive purchased from the Hughes Locomotive Company arrived. By February 1879 it had been joined by the other two that had been ordered and all three had begun work. Although the carriages arrived in 1878 it was not until 1883 that the Corris Railway Act 1883 was secured to allow the formal commencement of passenger services. A semi-official passenger service had been running since the early 1870s using adapted waggons to convey quarry workers and visitors.

The line was now in its settled form and began to operate a full service under Dix's energetic management. The railway was widely promoted to visitors as the best route to Tal-y-llyn Lake and Cader Idris (ignoring the claims of the rival Talyllyn Railway). The initial passenger service ran from Machynlleth to Corris, with new stations at Esgairgeiliog and Llwyngwern opening in 1884. The track was upgraded beyond Corris so that passenger services could reach the line's northern terminus at Aberllefenni, with services starting on 25 August 1887, and in the same year stations were also opened at Ffridd Gate and Garneddwen.

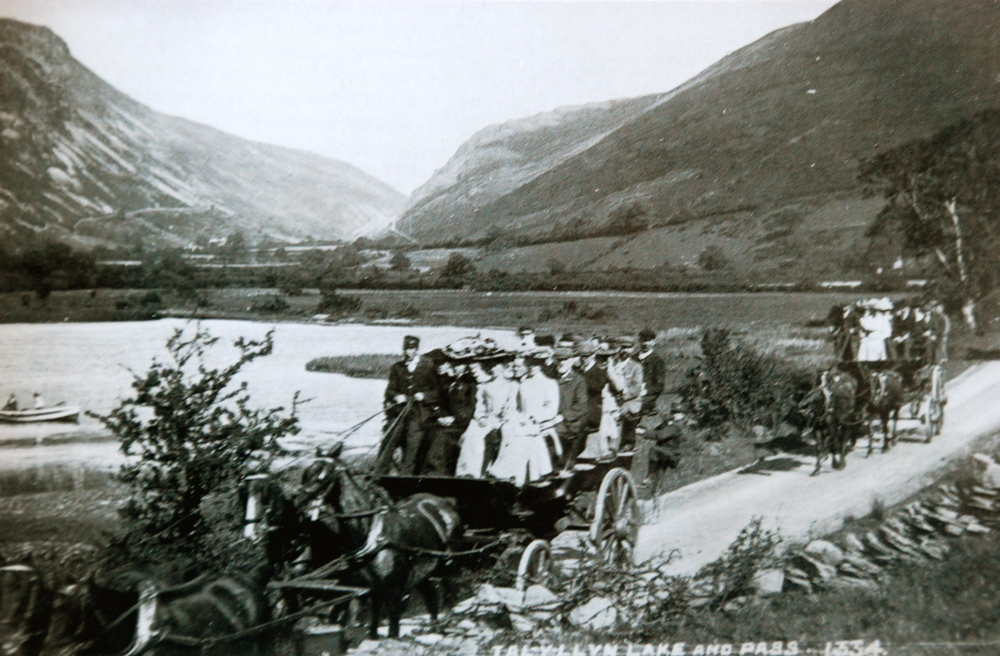
Horse-drawn charabancs owned by the Corris Railway pass Tal-y-llyn Lake on the "Grand Tour"

The railway developed a network of horse-hauled road services, including providing a link between Corris station and Abergynolwyn station on the Talyllyn Railway. This was promoted as part of a circular "Grand Tour" which took in the two narrow gauge railways and the Cambrian service between Tywyn and Machynlleth.

In 1892, control of Imperial Tramways moved to Bristol and George White of Bristol Tramways became chairman and Clifton Robinson became managing director. In the 1900s, Bristol motor buses were sent by the parent company to run the road services.

The closure of Braichgoch Quarry in 1906 brought the railway its first loss, and although the line continued on through subsequent decades, serving the quarries around Corris and Aberllefenni, it never again showed a profit. The bridge over the River Dyfi was rebuilt that year replacing the second timber viaduct with a steel bridge on slate piers.

==== Decline: 1907 to 1930 ====
Following a dispute with the directors, Dix was dismissed in June 1907, and replaced by John J O'Sullivan (formerly of the Cork, Blackrock and Passage Railway). A new station building at Machynlleth was completed towards the end of 1907. As well as slate and passengers, the line hauled timber extracted from the Dyfi forest in the 1910s through 1930s. There was also a constant traffic in coal and general goods to the quarries and communities served by the railway.

After World War I, the decline in slate traffic continued as cheaper foreign slate and alternative roofing materials became popular. O'Sullivan had died in office in 1917; the parent company's Secretary, Frederick H Withers, acted as manager until a new manager, Daniel J McCourt (who had worked on Imperial's Middlesbrough system until that was taken over by the local municipality) took over in 1921 and was responsible for developing and extending the connecting bus services as partial compensation for the decline in rail traffic.

==== Takeover and nationalisation: 1931 to 1948 ====
In late 1929, Imperial Tramways sold the Corris to the Great Western Railway (GWR), who by that time were the owners of the main line serving Machynlleth, whose primary interest was taking control of the railway's bus routes. After running a bus in direct competition with the railway in 1930, the railway's passenger service was withdrawn at the beginning of 1931. While the GWR did not relish owning another Welsh narrow gauge line, they did perform some track maintenance, and on at least two occasions the rolling stock was repainted.

On 1 January 1948, the line was nationalised along with its parent company, becoming part of British Railways (BR). While the GWR had tolerated the Corris, BR was looking for an excuse to close the loss making railway. In August 1948, that excuse came when the River Dyfi flooded. The waters began to undermine the Corris Railway embankment on the south side of the Dovey Bridge, and although the track was never breached, it was the excuse that BR needed to close the line. The last train ran on 20 August 1948 and the following day the railway was closed, without notice. The Aberllefenni to Corris section was lifted in November 1948, and 10 tons of the rail was purchased by Henry Haydn Jones for use on his Talyllyn Railway. By the end of 1950, track lifting had reached Machynlleth station.

In 1951, the Talyllyn Railway became the first railway in the world to be preserved. The Talyllyn purchased the two remaining locomotives, which had been stored out of use at Machynlleth, along with several goods waggons and the brake van – see List of Talyllyn Railway rolling stock. In 1958, the Talyllyn also purchased one of the Corris carriages, which had been in use as a summerhouse in a garden in Gobowen.

=== Preservation ===
==== Early days: 1966 to 1980 ====
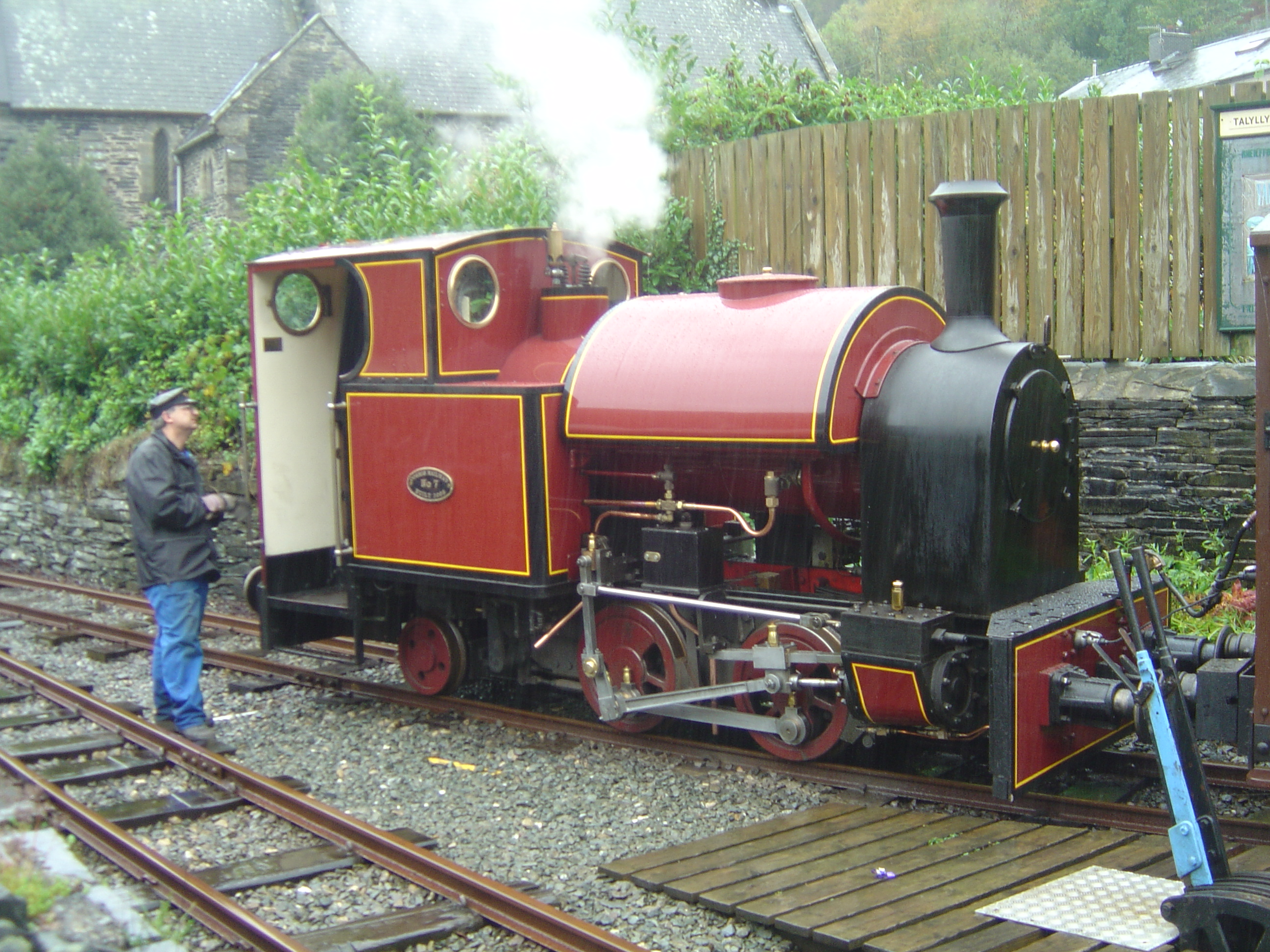
The Corris Railway's own steam locomotive, No. 7, at Corris on 28 October 2006

In the early 1960s a group of volunteers from the Talyllyn Railway, led by Alan Meaden, began visiting Corris. They wanted to establish a museum for the line and formed The Corris Society in December 1966. Another group, the Corris Railway Preservation Society, was set up in the West Midlands around the same time. The two groups merged, forming the Corris Railway Society in 1968 with the aim of preserving what was left of the railway, opening a dedicated museum, and to explore reviving some or all of the line. Many of the founding members of the Society were volunteers on the Talyllyn.

Other than at Aberllefenni and Braichgoch quarries, no rails remained in situ along the Corris route. Initially the Society sought to purchase Machynlleth station for its museum, but when this proved impossible it turned its sights elsewhere. The main buildings of Corris station were demolished in 1968 leaving only the adjacent railway stable block standing, and these buildings – badly in need of maintenance – were acquired, along with a short section of trackbed leading southwards. In 1970 the first part of the building was opened as the Corris Railway Museum. A short length of "demonstration" track was laid in 1971.

During the 1970s, the Society undertook lengthy negotiations with the relevant authorities to establish the requirements for re-opening the line for passengers, while steadily building up funds and equipment In 1974, planning permission was received to re-open the line from Maespoeth Junction to Corris station. A new Corris Railway Company, reviving the original name, was incorporated to act as the Society's trading and operating arm, while the Society achieved charitable status. The Museum was extended as more of the building was returned to satisfactory condition.

==== Restoring from Maespoeth: 1981 to 2001 ====
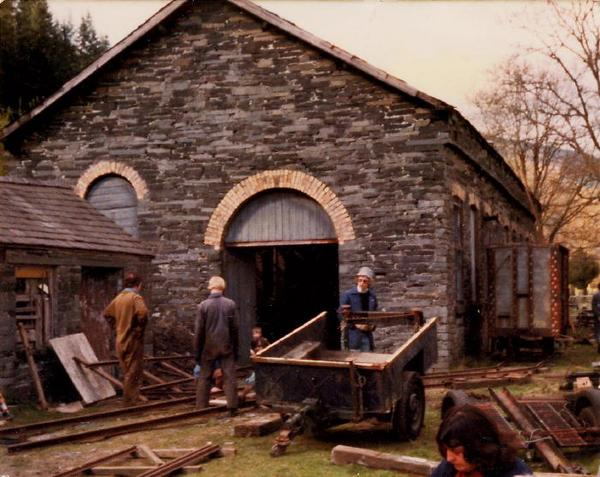
Maespoeth shed in the early 1980s

In 1981 the line's original locomotive shed at Maespoeth was acquired and became the railway's operational base. During the 1980s light track was laid between Maespoeth and Corris, a distance of just under a mile (1.6 km). The formal "first train" back to Corris ran on 24 April 1985. In the following years the track was upgraded to passenger standards while negotiations with the authorities continued.

==== Passenger services resume: 2002 to present ====
In the summer of 2002, passenger services resumed after a break of seventy-two years, initially diesel-hauled. The railway built a new steam locomotive, to a design based on the Kerr Stuart No. 4, which arrived on the railway on 17 May 2005 and runs as No. 7 (the Corris Railway never officially named its locomotives). No. 7 went into service on 20 August 2005, fifty-seven years to the day since the last train on the original railway, and now hauls the regular passenger service between Corris and Maespoeth.

The railway is also actively pursuing a southwards extension towards Machynlleth, with the initial aim of extending the line to Tan-y-Coed, midway between Esgairgeiliog and Llwyngwern and some 2 1/2 miles south of Corris. As always, this is involving lengthy negotiations with the authorities, not least due to the line south of Maespoeth running immediately adjacent to the A487 trunk road. While these are continuing the railway has consolidated its facilities at Maespoeth with the construction of a new two-road carriage shed in the adjacent field (the original carriage sheds at Corris and Machynlleth having been demolished). In 2015 work began on building the new diversion embankment to enable the southerly extension.

During 2009, the railway marked the 150th anniversary of the first train on the Corris with a series of events, including demonstration horse-worked freight trains and gravity runs of rakes of waggons.

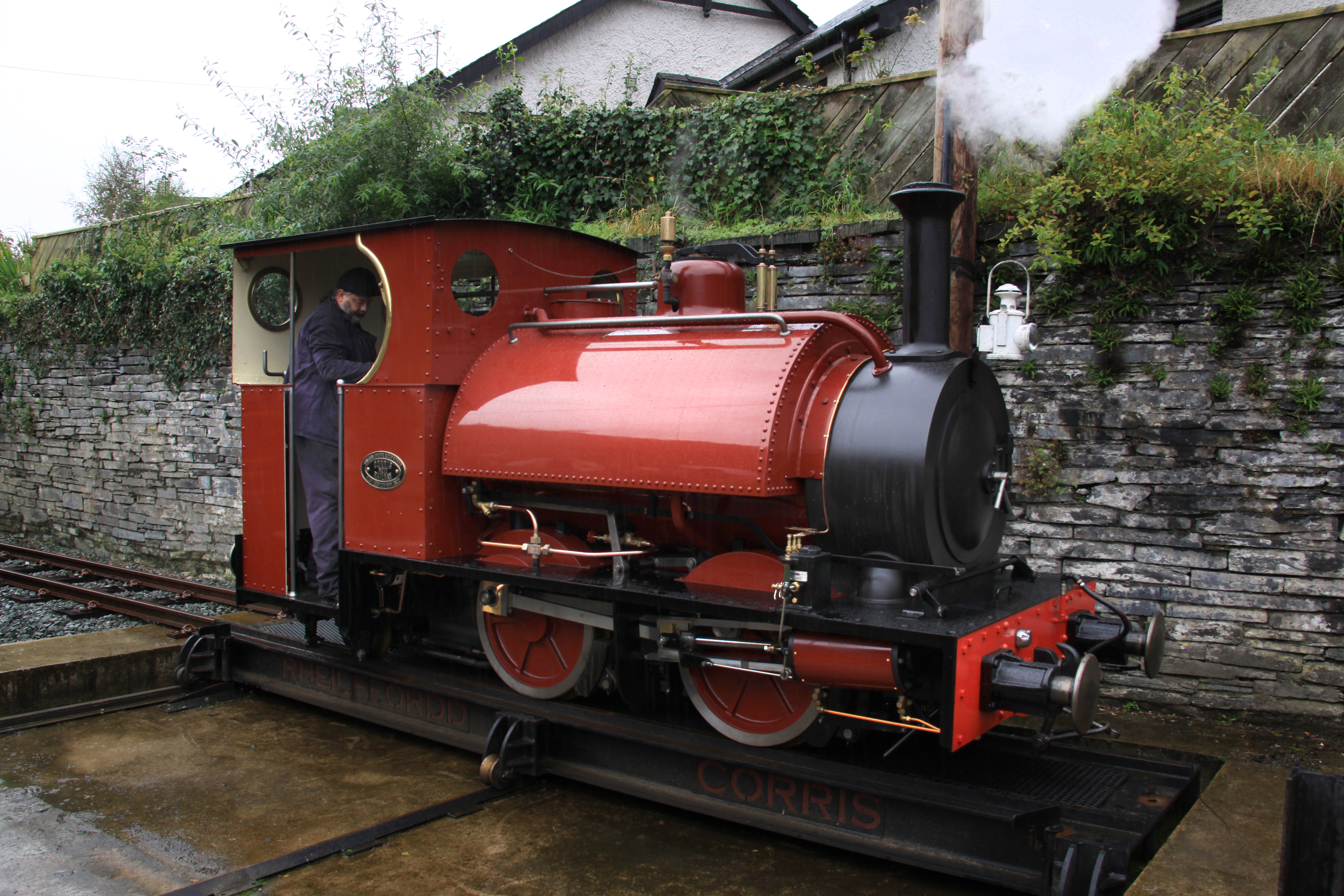
Locomotive No. 10 on the traverser at Corris Station in 2023

The revived Corris Railway has maintained friendly links with the Talyllyn Railway, which resulted in both of the original Corris locos and rolling stock returning to the railway. In 1996 ex-Corris loco No. 4 returned to celebrate its 75th anniversary. In 2003, ex-Corris loco No. 3 returned on the occasion of its 125th anniversary with a heritage train of carriage No. 17, brake van No. 6 and two trucks. Corris No. 5 visited the Talyllyn Railway in 1983 and 1990, and No. 7 in October 2011. It hauled a few charter trains and played a part in the TR's Corris Weekend, when it ran with the two surviving ex Corris engines; No. 4 (Edward Thomas) and No. 3 (Sir Haydn) and stock.

Both the surviving original locomotives have visited the Corris since its reopening. In 2012, No. 3 featured in a steam Gala over May Bank Holiday weekend along with the railway's resident steam loco No. 7. No. 3's boiler ticket expired on 17 May 2012 and the loco was on static display at Maespoeth until February 2013, when the loco left the Corris to tour heritage railways and museums in the UK to raise awareness of the Talyllyn and to raise funds for its overhaul.

== About the railway ==
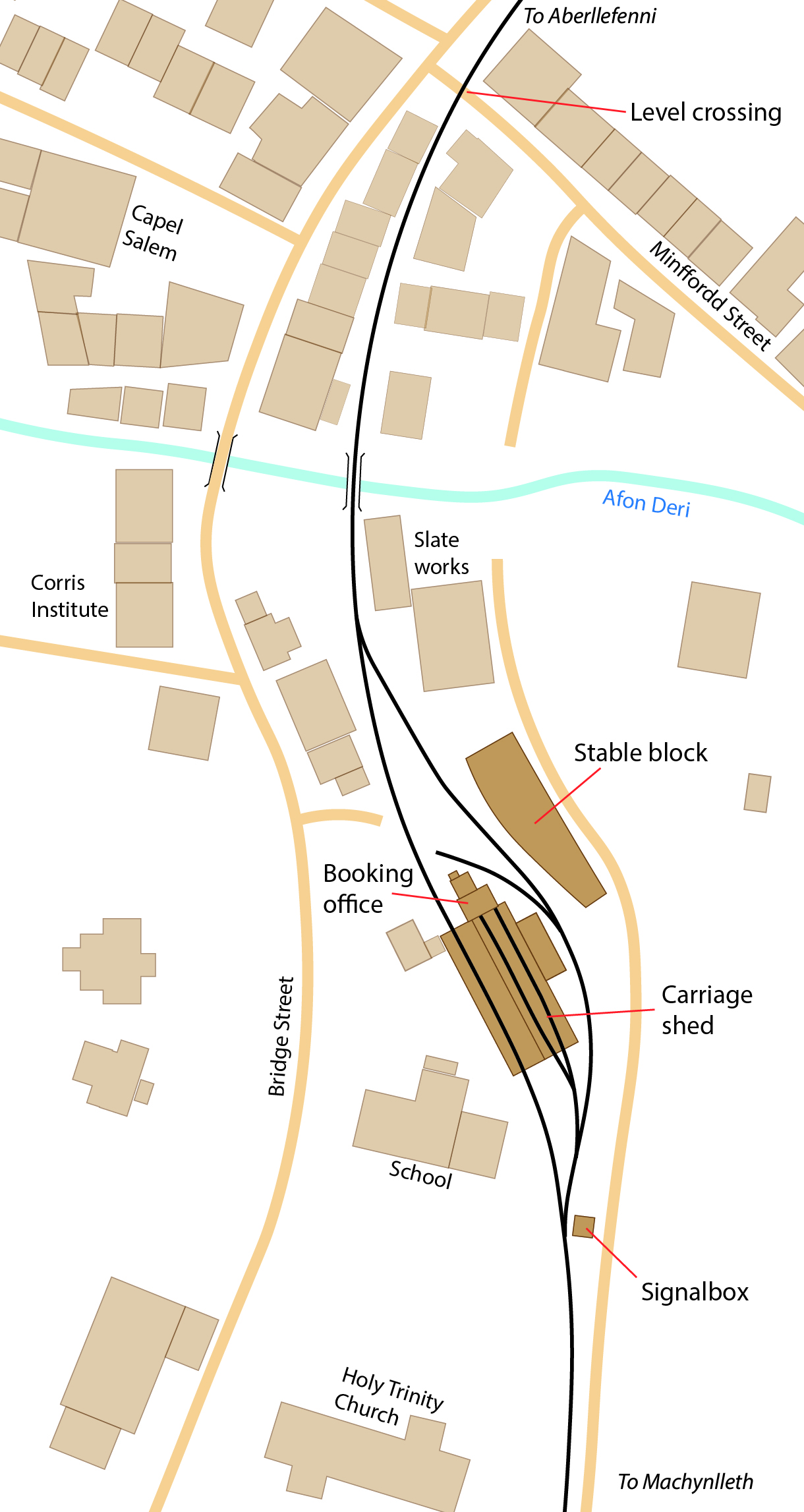
Corris station in the 1890s

The Corris Railway had several unusual features:

- The 2 ft 3 in (686 mm) gauge is rare, shared by only three other public lines in the UK: the nearby Talyllyn Railway and Plynlimon and Hafan Tramway and the Campbeltown and Machrihanish Light Railway in Scotland. The Glyn Valley Tramway between Chirk and Pontfaen is being rebuilt to 2ft 3in to allow for stock transfer at gala events.
- Its origins as a horse tramroad and ascent through the narrow and winding Dulas valley meant it had exceptionally tight curves. Its original passenger carriages were simple 4-wheelers derived from urban horse-drawn tramway designs with end balconies; they rode poorly and were quickly rebuilt into longer bogie carriages by placing two of the original bodies end-to-end on a longer underframe.
- The stations were exceptionally narrow, again because of the geography of the line, and all were on the east side of the rails, so the carriages and locomotives had doors on that side only, as on the Talyllyn Railway.
- The vertical trestle waggons for carrying large slabs of slate from the quarries were also rarely found on other railways, notable exceptions being the Ffestiniog Railway and the nearby Hendre-Ddu Tramway.
- Corris Station and the original Machynlleth Station had overall roofs, features which were rare on a British narrow gauge railway. At Corris, the roof was over the main running line and trains for Aberllefenni passed under it; at Machynlleth the rear of the train rested under the station roof while the front was in the open air. The original Machynlleth station was demolished and replaced in 1907 with the building that still stands alongside the A487 trunk road north of the main-line railway overbridge. The track bed continued under the main-line railway overbridge alongside Heol Y Doll, through its own arch that was closed with stone blocks until it was re-opened in 2023/24 as part of the new Dyfi bridge project. Beyond the overbridge, a Texaco petrol station is sited on the former route.

== Route ==
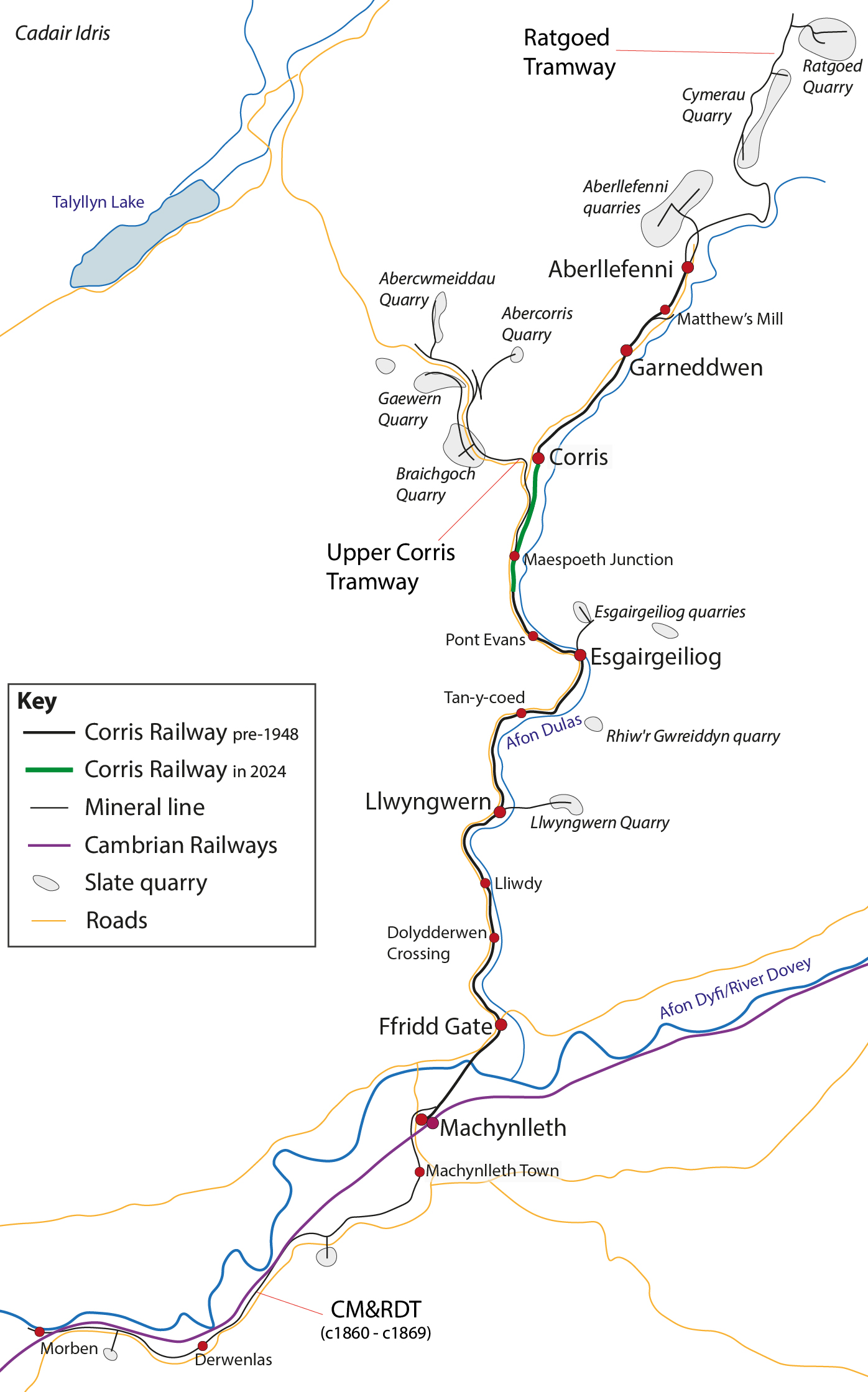
Map of the Corris Railway

=== Stations and halts ===
- Morben Cei (or Quay) Ward was the wharf on the River Dyfi that was the main transshipment point for the original tramroad. Closed in 1869. An extension of the line beyond Cei Ward was planned, but never built.
- Derwenlas at the Cei Tafarn Isa and Cei Ellis wharves on the River Dyfi . Closed in 1863 when the river wharves were cut off by the construction of the Aberystwith and Welsh Coast Railway.
- Machynlleth Town the original passenger and goods station, opened around 1860. Closed between 1874 and 1880, when it was replaced by the passenger station at Machynlleth.
- Machynlleth, from 1878 the southern passenger terminus serving the town of Machynlleth. This was the main slate transshipment point following the building of Cambrian Railways yard. The passenger station was an interchange with the Cambrian Railways station, and was rebuilt in 1904. At various times there were horse stables, a carriage shed and two signal boxes. The trackbed here is now covered by an industrial estate, but the station building survives.
- Ffridd Gate for Llanwrin village and the small hamlet of Fridd. The station was situated beside the railway's Level crossing over the B4404 road.
- Doldderwen Crossing, an unofficial stopping point, in the Ffridd Woods.
- Lliwdy, an unofficial stopping point, slightly closer to Pantperthog village than Llwyngwern station.
- Llwyngwern serving Pantperthog village and the Plas Llyn-gwern house, on the opposite side of the valley.
- Tan y Coed, serving the Tan-y-Coed Natural Resources Wales picnic site. This station never existed on the original railway (neither did the picnic site), but is proposed as a major station and temporary terminus of the revived railway.
- Esgairgeiliog serving Esgairgeiliog village - also known as Ceinws - on the opposite side of the Dulas River.
- Pont Evans signalled level crossing and unofficial stopping point.
- Maespoeth Junction the locomotive and carriage shed, with no passenger station before preservation. The site housed a signal box until the Second World War, which controlled the points for the junction with the Upper Corris Tramway and points in the yard. Maespoeth is the current southern terminus of the preserved railway.
- Corris, the railway's primary northern station serving Corris village. As well as the station building, there was a stable, a parcel office, and a carriage shed. There was a signal box here until the Second World War, which controlled points in the yard. Corris station is the northern terminus of the preserved railway.
- Garneddwen, serving the hamlet of Garneddwen – a row of Aberllefenni quarry workers' housing. The trackbed here is now an access road for the hamlet.
- Aberllefenni, the northern passenger terminus serving the village of Aberllefenni. A narrow station, perched on a steep slope. The site is now covered by a housing estate.

=== Branch lines and tramways ===
The Corris Railway had numerous branch lines, mainly built to serve the slate quarries along its route. The principal branches were:

- The Llwyngwern quarry tramway, at Llwyngwern.
- The Era quarry tramway at Esgairgeiliog.
- The Upper Corris Tramway from Maespoeth Junction serving Braichgoch slate mine and quarries surrounding Corris Uchaf.
- The Matthew's Mill Siding near Aberllefenni serving the slate enamelling works known at different times as Y Magnus and Matthew's mill.
- The Aberllefenni quarry tramway connecting the slate mill with three quarries.
- The Ratgoed Tramway north of Aberllefenni serving Cymerau Quarry and Ratgoed Quarry.

Only the Aberllefenni Quarry tramway may have been locomotive worked, and in the 1960s and 1970s a tractor was used to haul waggons along it. The rest of these branches were operated by gravity and horses.

Other temporary branches were built to aid forestry works from the First World War until the 1930s.

=== Quarries served ===
The principal reason for the existence of the Corris Railway was to serve the slate quarries of this district. Although usually referred to as quarries, those on the Narrow Vein were usually underground mine workings, following the course of the vein, while those on the Broad Vein were more usually opencast quarries. The outliers in the south of the valley were also opencast. This list shows the main quarries that the railway served:

- Morben quarry - an early quarry that was connected to the CM&RDT by an incline
- Ogo Fach Quarry - an early quarry connected to the CM&RDT by a short tramway through a tunnel.
- Llwyngwern quarry – connected to Llwyngwern by its own tramway
- Rhiw'r Gwreiddyn quarry – not directly connected, but slate was carted to Esgairgeiliog and loaded onto Corris trains.
- Era quarry – connected to Esgairgeiliog by its own tramway
- Abercorris quarry – connected to Maespoeth Junction by the Upper Corris Tramway
- Gaewern quarry – connected to the Upper Corris Tramway, subsequently worked together with Braichgoch.
- Braichgoch quarry – connected to the Upper Corris Tramway
- Abercwmeiddaw quarry – the main Broad Vein quarry in the Corris area. Connected to the Upper Corris Tramway.
- Aberllefenni quarries – connected via internal tramway at Aberllefenni
- Cambergi quarry – not directly connected, but output carried by cart to Aberllefenni
- Cymerau quarry – connected to the Ratgoed Tramway
- Ratgoed quarry – connected to the Ratgoed Tramway

The railway also served Y Magnus (Matthew's Mill), a slate enamelling works situated between Aberllefenni and Garneddwen with its own tramway.

== Locomotives ==
=== Original railway ===
Three locomotives were supplied in 1878, and partially rebuilt between 1883 and 1900 from 0-4-0STs to 0-4-2STs. By the 1920s the locomotives were badly worn. A new locomotive, No. 4, was supplied in 1921. In 1923, parts from Nos. 1 and 3 were combined to produce one working locomotive, which carried the number 3. The remaining original locomotive, No 2, was held in reserve until 1928. A report dated 12 October 1929 stated that locomotives 1 and 2 had been "marked off for some time as scrap" and the remains of both engines were handed over to a local scrap merchant and excluded from the assets taken over by the GWR.

The locomotives that ran on the original Corris Railway between 1878 and 1948 (none carried names on the Corris) were:

Number	Image	Builder	Wheel arrangement	Works Number	Built	Notes	Current Status	Current location
1		Hughes Locomotive Company, in Falcon Works	0-4-2ST	324	1878	Originally built as an 0-4-0ST, scrapped 1930	Scrapped	N/A
2		Hughes Falcon Works	0-4-2ST	322	1878	Originally built as an 0-4-0ST, scrapped 1930	Scrapped	N/A
3		Hughes Falcon Works	0-4-2ST	323	1878	Originally built as an 0-4-0ST. In 1927 it was rebuilt using parts from all three Hughes locomotives. Purchased by the Talyllyn Railway in 1951, and named Sir Haydn.	Operational	Talyllyn Railway
4		Kerr Stuart	0-4-2ST	4047	1921	Tattoo class locomotive, purchased by the Talyllyn Railway in 1951. Then given the name Edward Thomas.	Operational	Talyllyn Railway

=== Preserved railway ===
Locomotives brought to the restored Corris Railway since 1967 have been numbered in the original locomotive numbering series, from 5 onwards. They are:

Number	Image	Name	Builder	Wheel arrangement	Works Number	Built	Notes	Current Status	Passenger train certified (Air braked)
5		Alan Meaden	Motor Rail Simplex	4wDM	22258	1965	Purchased in 1974, ex-Staveley Lime Products, Hindlow, Derbys. Formerly 2 ft (610 mm) gauge. Named in honour of the Society's founder.	Operational	No
6			Ruston and Hornsby	4wDH	518493	1966	Purchased in 1982, ex-British Copper Refiners, Prescot, Merseyside. Converted from 2 ft 6 in (762 mm) gauge.	Operational	Yes
7			Winson Engineering and Drayton Designs	0-4-2ST	17	2005	Built for the railway, based on the Kerr Stuart "Tattoo" class design of No. 4	Operational	Yes
8			Hunslet	4wDM	7274	1973	Ex-Houghton Main Colliery, Barnsley. On long-term loan from the National Coal Mining Museum	Not economically restorable so returned to owners	No
9		Aberllefenni	Clayton	4wBE	B0457	1974	Ex-Aberllefenni Slate Quarry. Donated and named by Wincilate Ltd	Operational	No
10			Alan Keef Ltd and Corris Railway	0-4-2ST	91	2022	Based on the original Hughes locomotives. Built by Alan Keef Ltd and members of the Corris Railway Society.	Operational	Yes
11		Vlad	Orenstein & Koppel	0-4-0DH	25721	1957	Purchased in 2015 from Austria, rewired, regauged and repainted in Romania May 2015	Operational	Yes

=== Usage ===
As of 2023, locomotives 7 and 10 are the only steam engines, and share passenger duties. Locomotive 11 is the main diesel motive power unit for both works trains and out of season passenger trains, supported by the lighter diesel locomotives 5 and 6, which are currently the main works and shunting units.

== Carriages ==
=== Historic ===
The CM&RDT carried passengers from as early as 1860, despite this being explicitly prohibited by its authorising Act. Until 1874, passengers travelled in open waggons attached to the quarry trains. From October 1874, the railway ran separate, timetabled passenger trains. Around 1875, at least two wagons were converted to crude, almost windowless closed carriages.

In November 1878, ten four-wheel, tramcar-like carriages were delivered from the Falcon Works, Loughborough. They were numbered 1 to 10, with a brake van from the same source taking the number 11. The first bogie carriage, also from Falcon, which looked like two four-wheel bodies mounted on a single chassis, received number 12, and the four-wheelers were rebuilt over a five-year period on new chassis to form five bogie vehicles. A renumbering had the rebuilds as 1 to 5 and the former 12 becoming 6.

Two all-new carriages to a similar design were built by the Metropolitan Railway Carriage and Wagon Company Ltd and numbered 7 & 8. Nos. 1 to 6 disappeared, presumed scrapped, after 1930; however Nos. 7 and 8 were used by a GWR employee at his home in Gobowen and subsequently preserved. No. 8 (used as a greenhouse-cum-garden shed) was recovered in 1958 and rebuilt for use on the Talyllyn Railway as their No.17 while No.7 (used as a chicken coop) was recovered ten years later and is on display in the Corris Railway Museum. The brake van was also preserved on the Talyllyn but has been substantially rebuilt after being damaged in a fire.

Carriages of the historic Corris Railway (1859–1948)
Sequential Number	Number Old CR system	Number New CR system	Wheel type	Body type	Builder	Fate
1	1		4-wheel	Short tram	Falcon Works	Bodywork incorporated into new bogie coach.
2	2		4-wheel	Short tram	Falcon Works	Bodywork incorporated into new bogie coach.
3	3		4-wheel	Short tram	Falcon Works	Bodywork incorporated into new bogie coach.
4	4		4-wheel	Short tram	Falcon Works	Bodywork incorporated into new bogie coach.
5	5		4-wheel	Short tram	Falcon Works	Bodywork incorporated into new bogie coach.
6	6		4-wheel	Short tram	Falcon Works	Bodywork incorporated into new bogie coach.
7	7		4-wheel	Short tram	Falcon Works	Bodywork incorporated into new bogie coach.
8	8		4-wheel	Short tram	Falcon Works	Bodywork incorporated into new bogie coach.
9	9		4-wheel	Short tram	Falcon Works	Bodywork incorporated into new bogie coach.
10	10		4-wheel	Short tram	Falcon Works	Bodywork incorporated into new bogie coach.
11	11	11	4-wheel	Corris brake van	Falcon Works	In service at Talyllyn Railway as TR 6.
12	12	6	Bogie	Corris bogie	Falcon Works	Scrapped after 1930.
13		1	Bogie	Corris bogie	Corris Railway	Scrapped after 1930.
14		2	Bogie	Corris bogie	Corris Railway	Scrapped after 1930.
15		3	Bogie	Corris bogie	Corris Railway	Scrapped after 1930.
16		4	Bogie	Corris bogie	Corris Railway	Scrapped after 1930.
17		5	Bogie	Corris bogie	Corris Railway	Scrapped after 1930.
18		7	Bogie	Corris bogie	Metropolitan Carriage & Wagon	Owned by Corris Railway. Partially restored as museum exhibit.
19		8	Bogie	Corris bogie	Metropolitan Carriage & Wagon	Owned by Talyllyn Railway. Fully restored and in service as TR 17.

=== Current ===
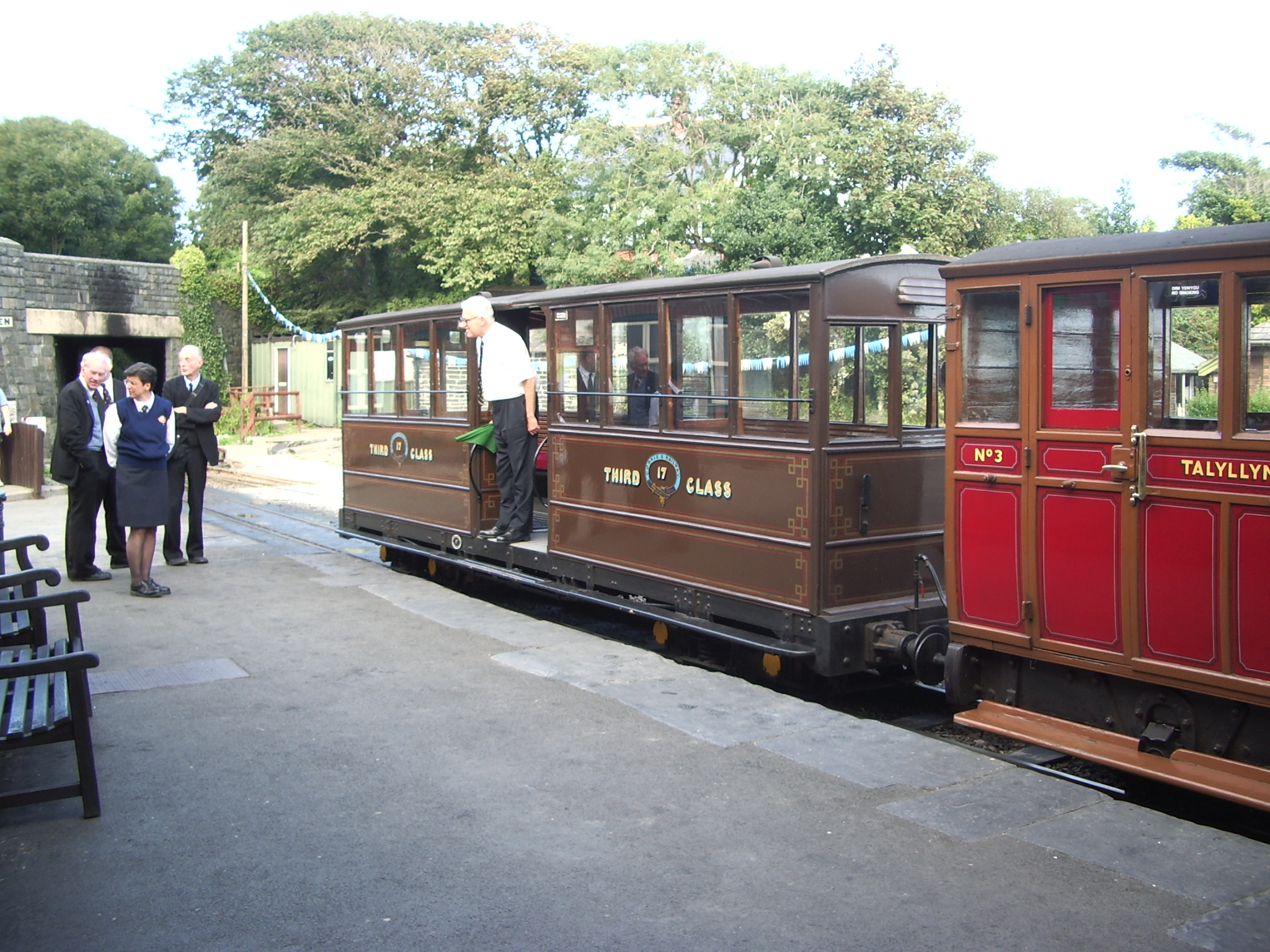
Preserved Corris Railway carriage no 8 (TR no 17) at the Talyllyn Railway, August 2005.

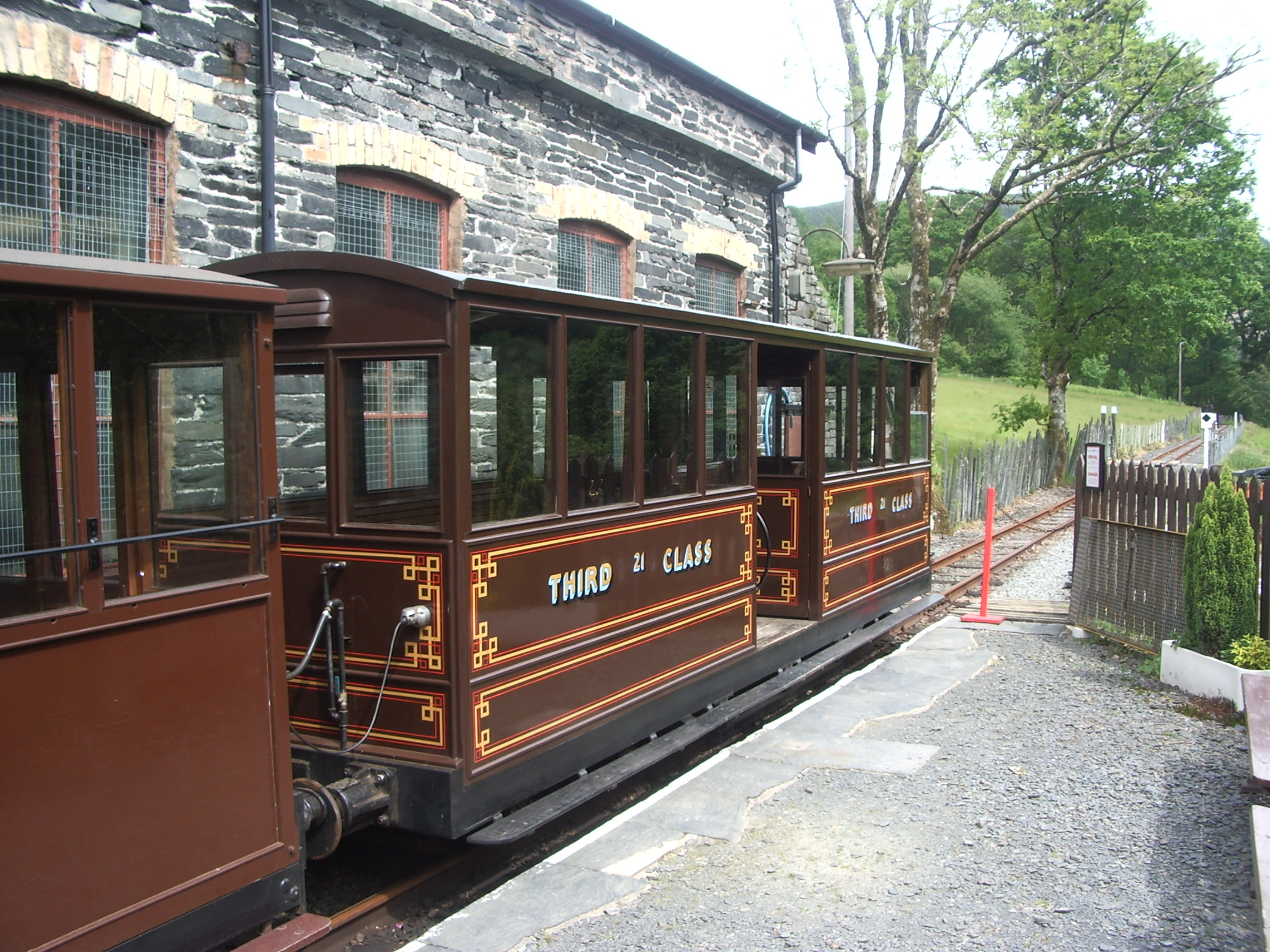
Carriage no 21 at Maespoeth May 2007.

As nineteen passenger vehicles (ten four-wheel carriages, eight bogie carriages and the brake van) ran on the original railway, the preservation Society has numbered its new build carriages from 20 onwards.

Carriage 7 is an original bogie carriage, but not available for service. It is on display in the railway museum at Corris.

Carriage 20 is similar in appearance to the bogie vehicles, but on a shorter, ex-National Coal Board four-wheel chassis. The southern compartment is fitted for the use of the train guard. It currently carries a plain un-lined livery but is due to be fully lined and lettered in due course.

Carriage 21 has been designed to appear as similar as possible to the original 19th Century bogie vehicles, but constructed to 21st Century safety standards with a steel chassis based on the Talyllyn Railway's standard bogie carriage design and a steel skeleton with timber cladding for the body. Completed in May 2003, it has a plain roof.

Carriage 22 has been constructed to the same standards as outlined above. Completed in July 2015, it has a clerestory roof, similar to those carried by two original carriages in the 1920s. From the completion of fitting-out in September 2015 the railway was again able to run an authentic-looking "1920s" train with the "Tattoo" locomotive and two bogie carriages.

Carriage 23 is another plain roof example. Assembly of the woodwork for the body commenced in autumn 2015, with the panelling and beading completed by the end of 2017; painting and fitting of seats continued during the Coronavirus lockdown, and the completed carriage was mounted on its bogies and test run in July 2020; it entered passenger service in 2021; the final stage was the addition of gold lining and lettering (to match coaches 21 and 22), which was completed by Easter 2022.

Carriage 24 is currently under construction at Maespoeth. It will be a first class carriage, with a clerestory roof. The main frame was constructed, and the metal body frame added, before the Coronavirus pandemic, during which construction slowed. Construction resumed apace in 2021, and body panels (with beading) have been fitted.

Carriages of the preserved Corris Railway (1966–present)
Number	Wheel type	Body type	Roof type	Entered service	Notes
7	Bogie	Corris all-wooden original	Elliptical	1898	Partially restored. Not in service.
20	4-wheel	Corris style new build	Elliptical	2002	Built on ex-NCB chassis.
21	Bogie	Corris steel-framed new build	Elliptical	2003	
22	Bogie	Corris steel-framed new build	Clerestory	2015	
23	Bogie	Corris steel-framed new build	Elliptical	2021	
24	Bogie	Corris steel-framed new build	Clerestory	–	Under construction.

== See also ==
- List of 2 ft 3 in gauge railways
- List of British heritage and private railways
- British narrow gauge railways
- The Great Little Trains of Wales

== Bibliography ==
- Boyd, James I.C. (1965). Narrow Gauge Railways in Mid Wales. The Oakwood Press.
- Briwnant Jones, Gwyn. Railway Through Talerddig.
- Briwnant Jones, Gwyn. Great Western Corris.
- Briwnant Jones, Gwyn. Last Days of the Old Corris.
- Briwnant Jones, Gwyn. Tales of the Old Corris.
- The Corris Railway Society (1988). A Return to Corris. Avon-Anglia Publications. ISBN 0-905466-89-6.
- Cozens, Lewis (1949). The Corris Railway.
- Johnson, Peter (2011). An Illustrated History of the Great Western Narrow Gauge. Oxford Publishing Co.
- Jones, David (2002). Corris Trwy Lygad y Camera/Through the Eye of the Camera. David Jones. ISBN 0-9543378-0-8.
