= Sir Haydn (locomotive) =

Preserved British steam locomotive

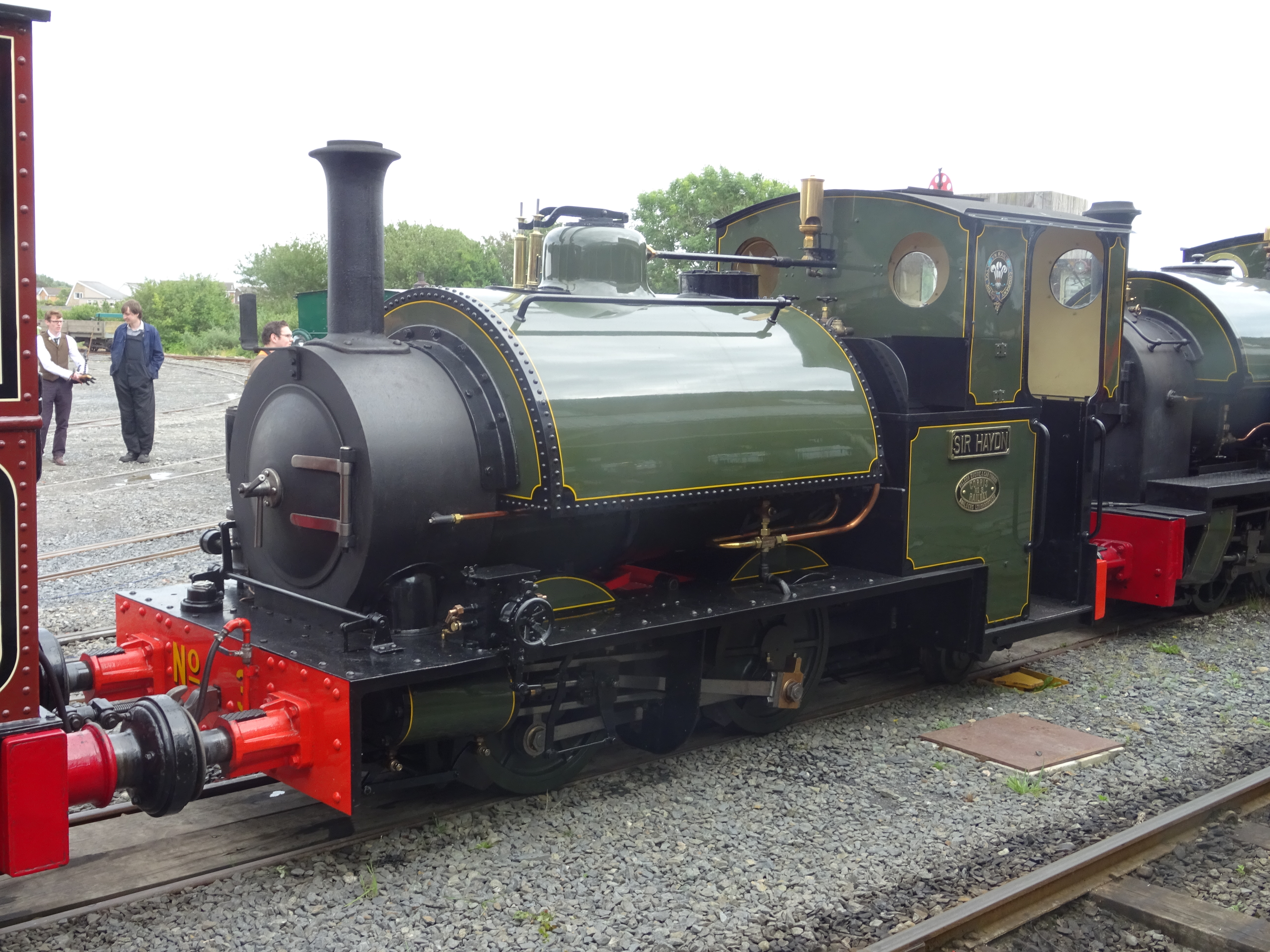
- Sir Haydn at Tywyn Wharf railway station
Type and origin
- Power type: Steam
- Builder: Hughes's Locomotive & Tramway Engine Works
- Serial number: 323
- Build date: 1878
- Total produced: 3
Specifications
- Configuration
  - Whyte: 0-4-2ST, originally 0-4-0ST
- Gauge: 2 ft 3 in (686 mm)
- Driver dia.: 2 ft 5 1/2 in (749 mm)
- Trailing dia.: 11 in (279 mm)
- Wheelbase: Coupled: 4 ft 0 in (1.22 m); Loco: 8 ft 3 1/2 in (2.53 m)
- Length: 16 ft 6 1/2 in (5.04 m)
- Loco weight: 9 long tons 5 cwt (20,700 lb or 9.4 t) (10.4 short tons)
- Boiler pressure: 160 lbf/in^{2} (1,100 kPa)
- Cylinders: Two, outside
- Cylinder size: 7 1/4 in × 12 in (184 mm × 305 mm)
Performance figures
- Tractive effort: 2,900 lbf (12.90 kN)
Career
- Operators: Corris Railway; Great Western Railway; British Railways; Talyllyn Railway
- Numbers: CR/GWR/BR/TR: 3

Sir Haydn is a narrow gauge steam locomotive, built by Hughes's Locomotive & Tramway Engine Works (later known as the Falcon Works), Loughborough in 1878. It operated on the Corris Railway in Wales, until closure in 1948, and since 1951 has operated on the nearby Talyllyn Railway. It has carried the operating number 3 under four successive owners.

== History ==
=== Corris Railway ===
The Corris Railway was a 2 ft 3 in (686 mm) gauge tramway built in 1859, which ran from Machynlleth north to Corris and on to Aberllefenni to serve local slate quarries. Originally, the line was horse-drawn, but three identical 0-4-0ST locomotives, numbered 1 to 3, were ordered from Hughes' in 1878. Between 1883 and 1900, the locos were fitted with trailing pony trucks, converting each of them into an 0-4-2ST. The locomotives after conversion resembled a locomotive built by Hughes for the Snailbeach District Railway and named Belmont. This locomotive was scrapped in 1912.

In December 1885, the Talyllyn Railway wrote to the board of the Corris Railway asking to buy one of the Hughes locomotives. Although the sale did not take place, it was a precursor to the post-preservation purchase of No. 3 by the Talyllyn more than 60 years later.

==== Rebuild ====
In 1921, the Corris acquired a fourth locomotive from Kerr Stuart and No.2 became a standby. No. 1 had received a new boiler in 1913, which had seen little use, and in 1922 the railway began the process of creating one working locomotive from components of the three Hughes locos. Evidence suggests that the resulting locomotive had: frames made up of plates from Nos. 1 and 3; the boiler and saddle tank of No. 1; the cab and bunker of No. 3; and possibly motion parts from No. 2. It is most accurate to say No. 1 was rebuilt using parts from the other locomotives, but the resulting engine carried number 3, including its works plates.

No. 2 remained largely intact at Machynlleth station until 1928. At the end of the 1920s negotiations began to sell the Corris Railway to the Great Western Railway and a report dated 12 October 1929 stated that locos 1 and 2 had been "marked off for some time as scrap"; they were handed over to a local scrap merchant and excluded from the assets taken on when the purchase was completed on 4 August 1930.

==== Great Western years ====
In the Great Western period the line was largely dependent on the slate output of Aberllefenni Quarry, which from 6 April 1935 was leased by the local member of parliament and owner of the Talyllyn Railway, Sir Henry Haydn Jones. His support for rail transport for the quarry's output was critical in keeping the railway open up to and including World War Two; without this support it is likely that the railway would have closed and the locomotives been scrapped. No. 3 was still working when the Corris came under the control of British Railways following nationalisation in 1948, but operation under this organisation proved short-lived as the last train ran on 20 August that year.

It then was left under tarpaulin at the rear of the Corris Railway's Machynlleth station along with the other remaining Corris engine, No. 4.

=== Talyllyn Railway ===
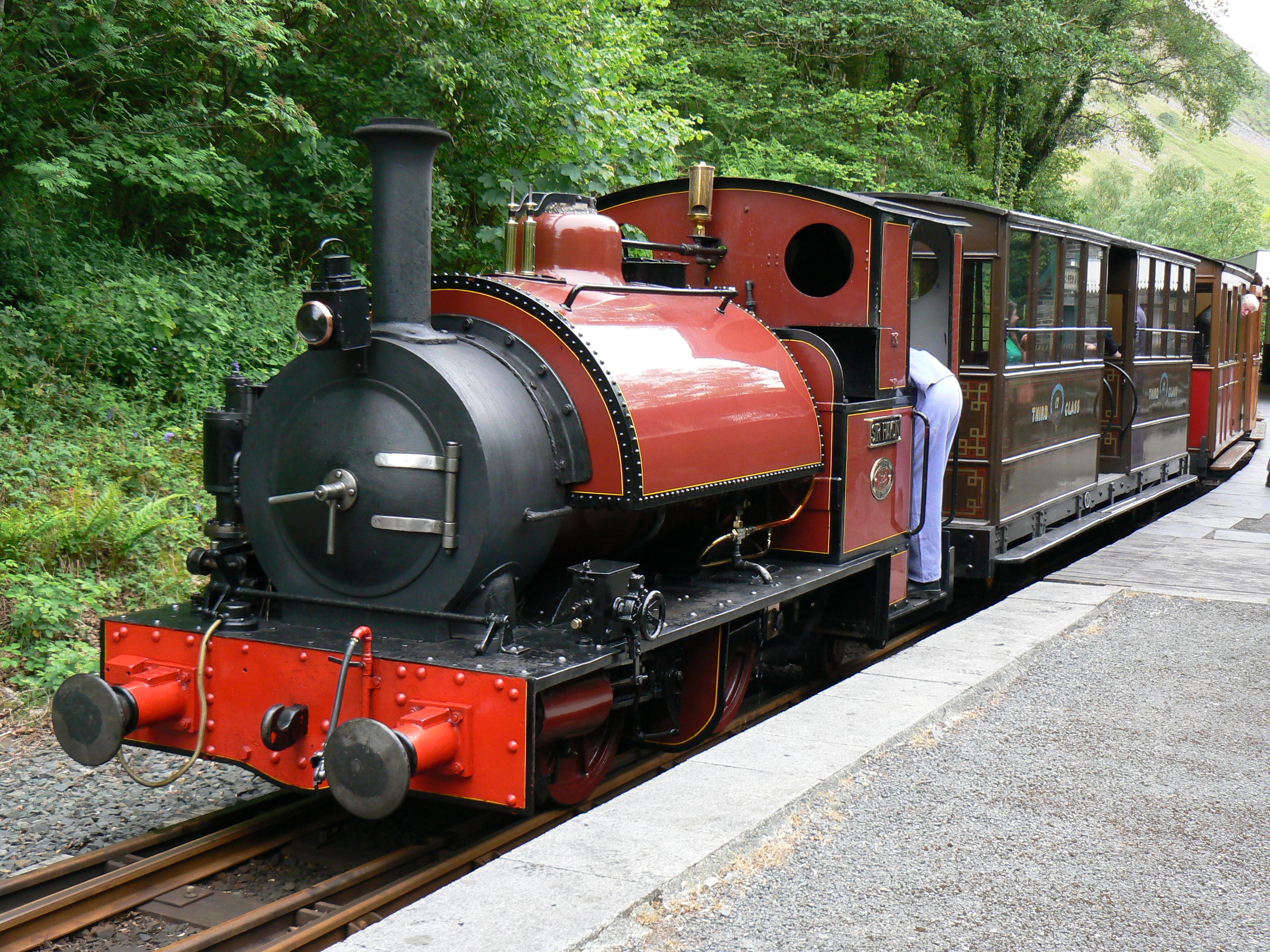
Talyllyn No. 3 at Abergynolwyn station

The Talyllyn Railway was built in 1865 and ran from Towyn (now spelt Tywyn) to the slate quarries of Bryn Eglwys, only a few miles from Corris. It had the same gauge as the Corris Railway but, unlike that line, used steam locomotives from the start. The Talyllyn Railway and quarries were bought by Sir Henry Haydn Jones in 1911. The venture made little money. The quarries closed in 1946, but Haydn Jones continued to operate the railway at a loss until his death in 1950.

That same year, a group of enthusiasts, including the author Tom Rolt, started a society to operate the railway on a volunteer basis. With the agreement of Haydn Jones' widow, control of the railway passed to the newly formed preservation society. One of the major problems facing the railway was a lack of working locomotives: Talyllyn had been out of service for some years and Dolgoch was in need of a major overhaul. The society purchased the two remaining Corris locos from British Railways for £25 each (equivalent to £683 in 2025).

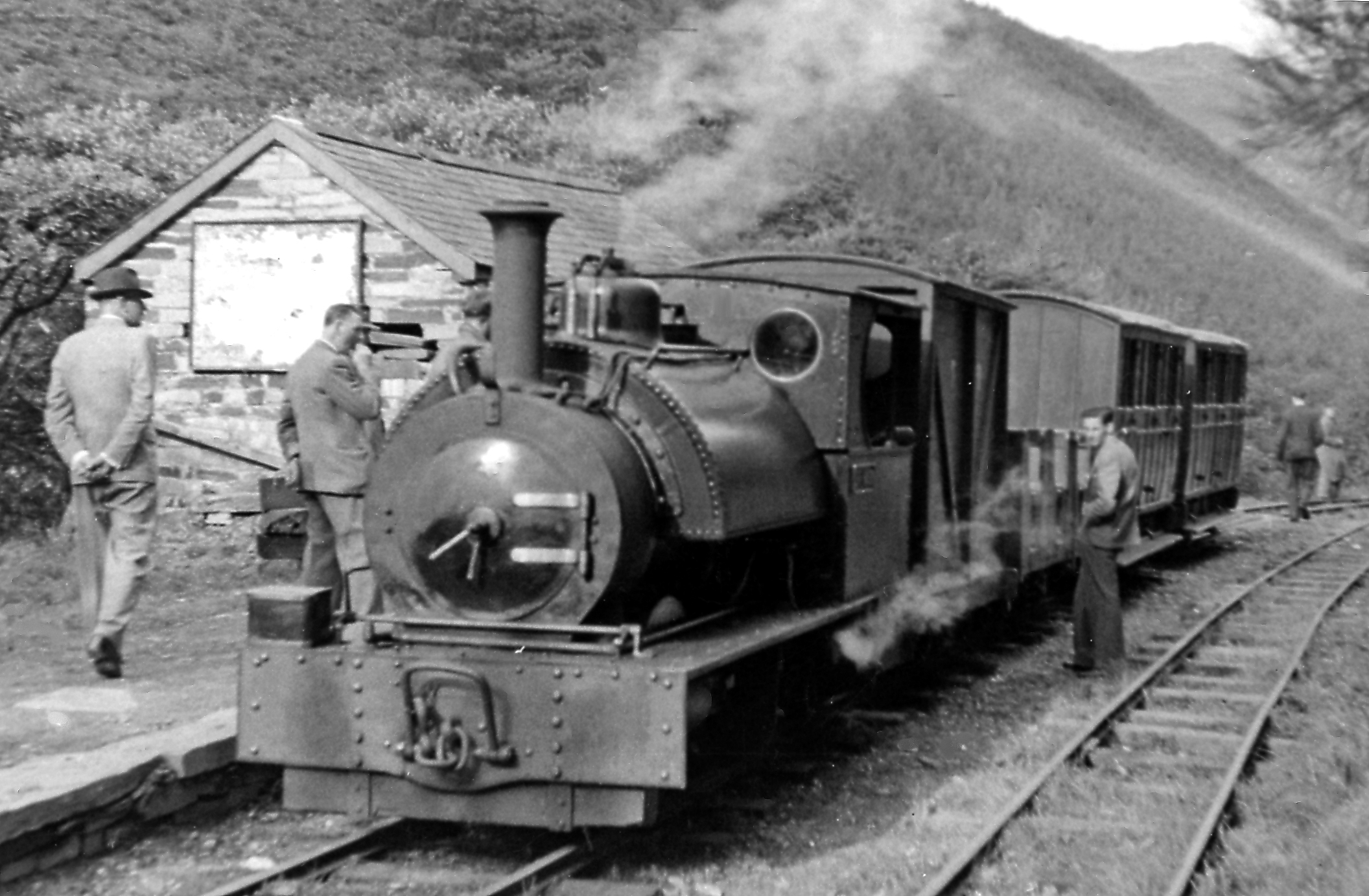
Sir Haydn at Abergynolwyn in 1953. The locomotive faced downhill towards Tywyn as there was no opening on the left-hand side of the cab.

No. 3 had been unnamed on the Corris. After arriving on the Talyllyn it was named Sir Haydn after the former owner of the railway. At the time, the crucial role that Haydn Jones had played in keeping the Corris running in the 1930s was not fully appreciated. He had played an important part in ensuring that No. 3 survived. Both No. 3 and No. 4 kept their Corris numbers, giving both locos the unusual distinction of carrying the same number through the ownership of four different railway companies: the Corris, Great Western, British Railways and Talyllyn Railway.

Both railways were built to the unusual gauge of 2 ft 3 in (686 mm) which meant the Corris locomotives could run on the Talyllyn unchanged. Sir Haydn was in better condition than No. 4 and became the first new locomotive to travel on the Talyllyn for over 85 years. However, the loco suffered from frequent derailment and could not be used safely: it turned out that the Talyllyn track was laid approximately 0.5 inches (13 mm) wider than the official gauge, a deliberate policy by the old company to accommodate the long wheelbase of Talyllyn. The two original Talyllyn locomotives had wide wheel treads that allowed them to stay on the wide-of-gauge track. This problem was eventually cured by fitting wider wheel treads to Sir Haydn and by a Territorial Army members' exercise in 1953 that relaid the railway to its correct gauge. The original cab, which only had an opening on the right-hand side, was replaced in the 1960s with a cab that was shorter and had openings on both sides.

== Return visits to Corris ==
The Corris Railway was reopened to passengers in 2002, and No. 3 returned there in June 2003 for a month of running trains to celebrate the railway's rebirth. It returned again at the end of April 2012 to run a series of special trains before the expiry of its boiler certificate in May, and remained at Corris until 24 April 2013. Afterwards No. 3 commenced a tour of various railway sites in England to help raise funds for an overhaul, which was undertaken at the Vale of Rheidol Railway workshops, in Aberystwyth, before returning to service on the Talyllyn in June 2018.

Alan Keef constructed a new locomotive based on the design of No. 3 for the Corris Railway. The first steaming took place on 24 September 2022 and it was delivered on 30 August 2023 to Maespoeth. It is now Corris No.10, known colloquially as the "Falcon". It visited the Talyllyn in the summer of 2024.

== Models ==
Bachmann of the USA is planning to release two liveries of Sir Haydn in HOn30 (OO9 as it is known to the UK).

== In fiction ==
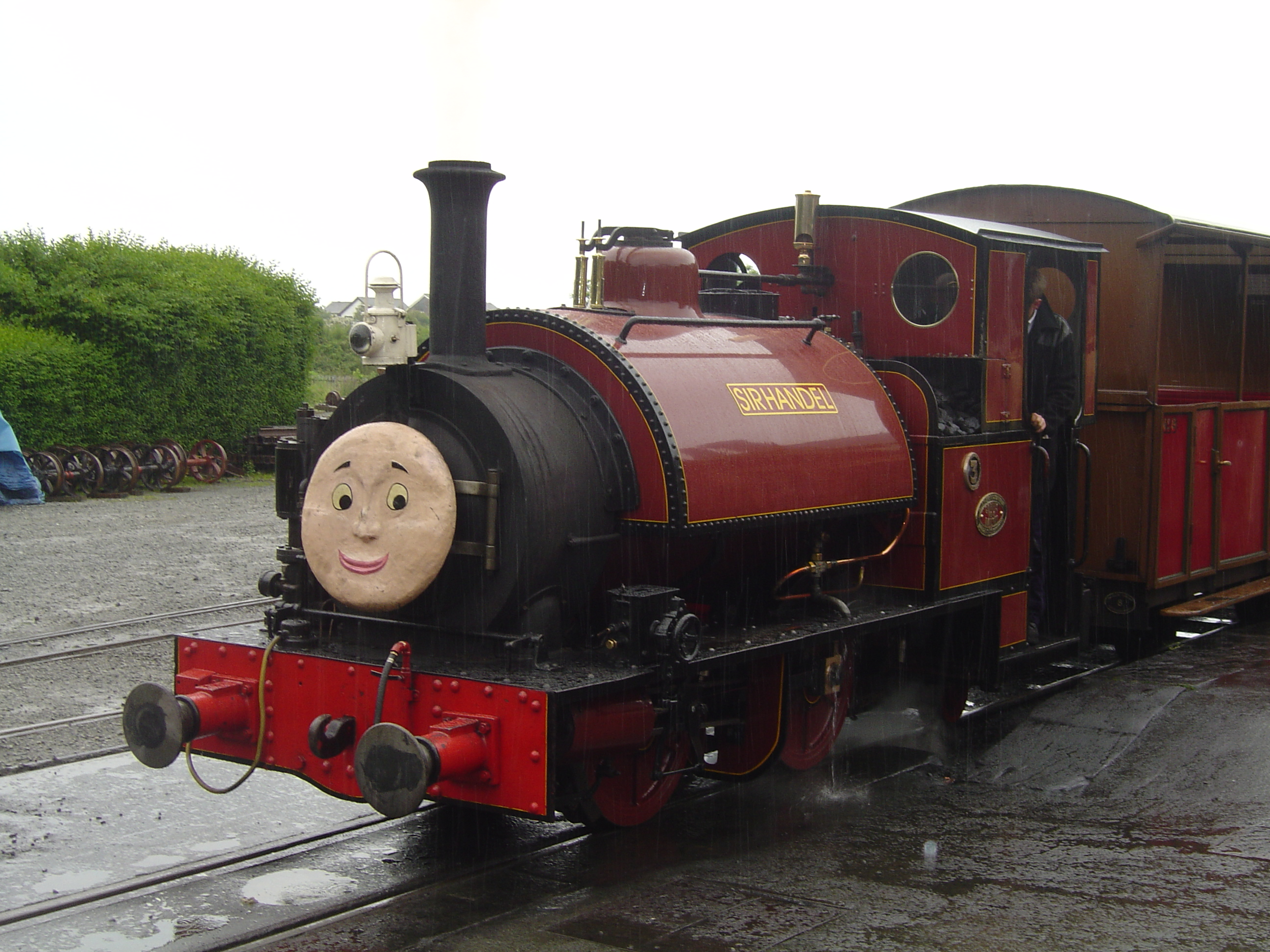
Talyllyn No. 3 in the guise of Sir Handel at Tywyn Wharf

The character Sir Handel in The Railway Series and Thomas & Friends is based on Sir Haydn.

In the 1980s, the Talyllyn Railway repainted Sir Haydn to represent Sir Handel. Christopher Awdry wrote this into the 1985 book Great Little Engines, explaining that Sir Handel was visiting the line to help out. An incident in which Sir Haydn ran into a tree branch and was given a bandage and eyepatch was turned into a story in the book, with almost no alteration from the real event.

== Bibliography ==
- Boyd, James I.C. (1965). Narrow Gauge Railways in Mid Wales. Oakwood Press. ISBN 978-0-85361-024-3.
- Davies, F. K.; Firth, J. M.; Lucking, J. H.; Thomas, R. E.; Allcock, N. J.; Sterndale, A. C.; Barrie, D. S. M.; Reed, P. J. T.; Mountford, E. R. (April 1966). White, D. E. (ed.). The Locomotives of the Great Western Railway, part ten: Absorbed Engines, 1922–1947. RCTS. ISBN 0-901115-20-7.
- Holmes, Alan (2009). Talyllyn Revived. The Talyllyn Railway. ISBN 978-0-900317-07-1.
- Potter, David (1990). The Talyllyn Railway. David St John Thomas. ISBN 978-0-946537-50-1.
- Cozens, Lewis (1949). The Corris Railway.
- The Corris Railway Society (1988). A Return to Corris. Avon-Anglia Publications. ISBN 978-0-905466-89-7.
