= Afon Dulas =

River in Wales

Coordinates: 52.6001°N 3.8418°W

The Dulas as it passes through Aberllefenni

Afon Dulas, also known as the North Dulas, is a river forming the border between Gwynedd (previously Merionethshire) and Powys (previously Montgomeryshire) in Wales. Another river called Afon Dulas joins the Dyfi from the south, upstream of its confluence with the North Dulas: locally this is referred to as the South Dulas.

== Route of North Dulas ==
Afon Dulas rises from a source in the hills above Aberllefenni and passes through Corris, Esgairgeiliog and Pantperthog before joining the River Dyfi at Ffridd Gate near Machynlleth.

=== History ===
The Dulas is recorded as an important land boundary in 1200, in a document written in 1428. This document describes the land owned by Einion ap Seisyllt, in the time of Llywelyn the Great, as "tota terra inter aquas de Dyfi et Delwas" (Latin, meaning: all the land between the rivers Dyfi and Dulas).

=== Roads and railways in the Dulas valley ===
- The A487 trunk road follows the valley from Ffridd Gate to Corris
- The Roman road Sarn Helen probably followed the valley from Aberllefenni to Ffridd Gate
- The Corris Railway ran through the valley from Aberllefenni to Ffridd Gate

=== Tributaries ===
- Nant Garfan
- Nant Lliwdy south of Pantperthog
- Nant y Darren at Pantperthog
- Nant Cwm Cadian north of Pantperthog
- Afon Glesyrch at Esgairgeiliog
- Nant y Goedwig south of Maespoeth Junction
- Afon Deri (formerly known as Afon Corris) at Corris
- Afon Llefenni at Aberllefenni
- Nant Llwydiarth at Pont Cymerau, Aberllefenni
- Nant Ceiswyn at Pont Cymerau, Aberllefenni

== South Dulas ==
It rises in Glaslyn, below the slopes of Foel Fadian, and passes the hamlet of Forge and Plas Dolguog before joining the Dyfi.

Close to its confluence with the Dyfi it is crossed by the Cambrian rail line on a bridge known as the Black Bridge. After the line had been repeatedly closed due to flooding after heavy rain, in 2021 it was announced that the bridge and its approaches were to be raised by a metre to try and alleviate the problem. Work began on 15 May and was due to be completed by 28 June.

=== Tributaries ===
- Afon Crewi at Felingerrig
