= Esgairgeiliog =

Village in Wales

Coordinates: 52.637°N 3.835°W

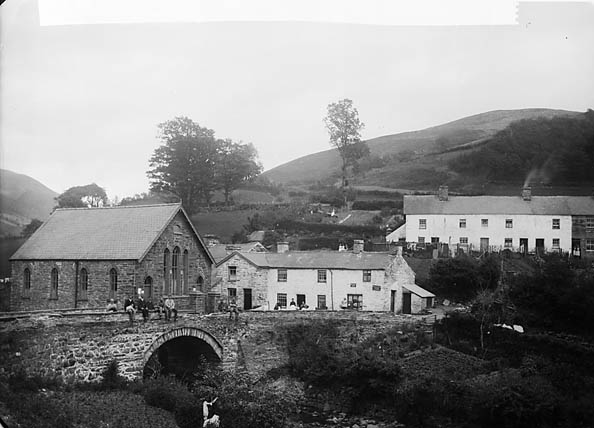
- General view of Esgairgeiliog, c.1885

- Location within Powys
- OS grid reference: SH759059
- Community: Glantwymyn
- Principal area: Powys
- Preserved county: Powys
- Country: Wales
- Sovereign state: United Kingdom
- Post town: MACHYNLLETH
- Postcode district: SY20
- Dialling code: 01654
- Police: Dyfed-Powys
- Fire: Mid and West Wales
- Ambulance: Welsh
- UK Parliament: Montgomeryshire and Glyndŵr
- Senedd Cymru – Welsh Parliament: Montgomeryshire

Esgairgeiliog (also known as Ceinws) is a village in Powys (formerly Montgomeryshire), Wales, UK. It is situated at the junction of the Afon Glesyrch's and Afon Dulas' valleys.

Behind the village is the former Era slate quarry, in the Glesyrch valley, and the Centre for Alternative Technology lies about a mile south of the village.

== History ==
The minor road on the east side of the Afon Dulas is believed to be of Roman origin. In 1910, this road was still mostly cobbled, with sections that crossed bedrock showing deep wheel ruts.

The Forestry Commission camp

Immediately after the Second World War, the Forestry Commission established the Dovey Forest (later known as the Dyfi Forest) in the land between Corris and Aberangell. A major camp was established on the east side of Esgairgeiliog.

== Murder of April Jones ==
In 2012, Mark Bridger, a resident of Ceinws, abducted and murdered five-year-old April Jones from the nearby town of Machynlleth. Bridger was sentenced to a whole life sentence in May 2013. His house was subsequently demolished.

== Railway station ==
Esgairgeiliog railway station was a station on the narrow-gauge Corris Railway, although it was the opposite side of the Afon Dulas river from the village, making the station in the county of Merionethshire (now Gwynedd) as opposed to the village, which was in Montgomeryshire (now Powys). A steeply-graded branch line crossed the river and led to the Era quarry, where slate could be taken from for transport to Machynlleth for transshipment.

The station was opened in 1884, and closed at the end of passenger services in December 1930.

The station was structurally and cosmetically restored in the early 1980s. The Corris Railway Society is now restoring the line, through Esgairgeiliog.

The station at Esgairgeiliog is the basis for Ulfstead Road, one of the Mid Sodor Railway's stations in The Railway Series.

Preceding station	Proposed Heritage railways	Following station
Tan-y-coed	Corris Railway	Maespoeth Junction
	Historical railways	
Llwyngwern	Corris Railway	Maespoeth Junction
