= Corris Railway Grand Tour =

British tourist service from 1886 to 1930

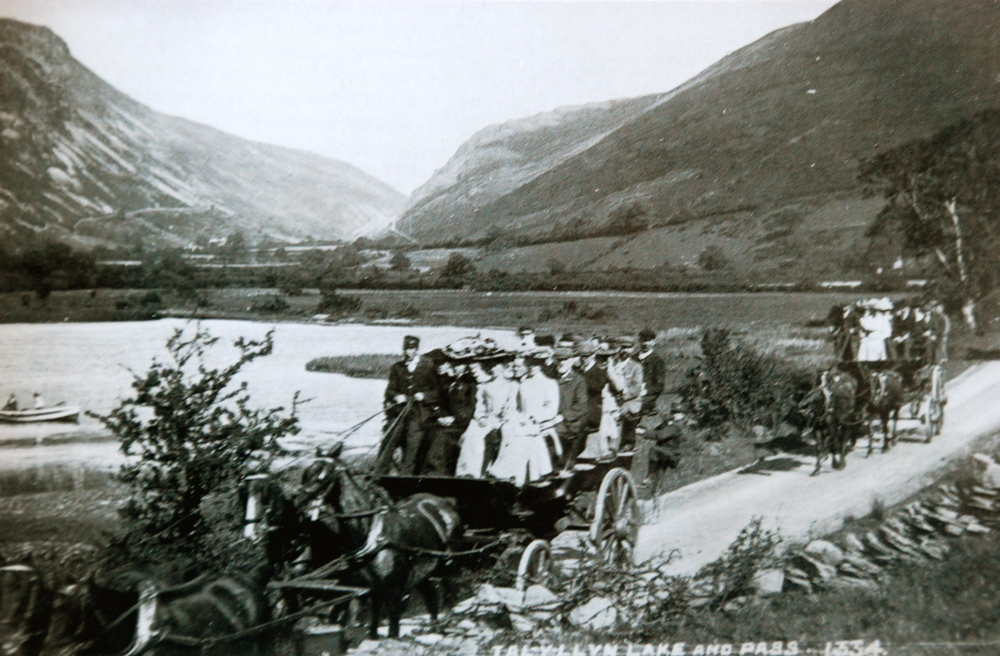
The Grand Tour charabancs pass Tal-y-llyn Lake, before 1908

The Corris Railway's Grand Tour was a tourist service that ran between 1886 and 1930. It involved a journey on the Corris Railway, a charabanc connection to the Talyllyn Railway and a return via the Cambrian Railways line between Tywyn and Machynlleth.

== History ==
In 1878 the Corris Railway, a narrow gauge railway in mid Wales was taken over by Imperial Tramways, a London-based company that rapidly expanded the railway. One of the innovations of the new owners was to encourage the use of the railway by tourists. They introduced horse-drawn charabancs to ferry passengers from the station at Corris to Tal-y-llyn Lake and Cadair Idris, four miles to the north.

The service was immediately popular and was soon extended in partnership with the nearby Talyllyn Railway to provide a "Grand Tour". Passengers joined the Corris Railway train at Machynlleth and travelled to Corris. From there they proceeded by charabanc to Tal-y-llyn lake, pausing for refreshments at the Pen-y-Bont Hotel, and on to Abergynolwyn, where they joined the Talyllyn train for the trip to the coast at Tywyn. Here they met the standard gauge Cambrian Railways train which returned them to Machynlleth.

In 1892 the Imperial company moved its headquarters to Bristol, where it shared senior management with the Bristol Tramways. In the early years of the twentieth century the Bristol company replaced the horse-drawn vehicles with motor charabancs.
