= Ffridd Gate railway station =

Railway station in Wales

Coordinates: 52.6043°N 3.8454°W

Ffridd Gate
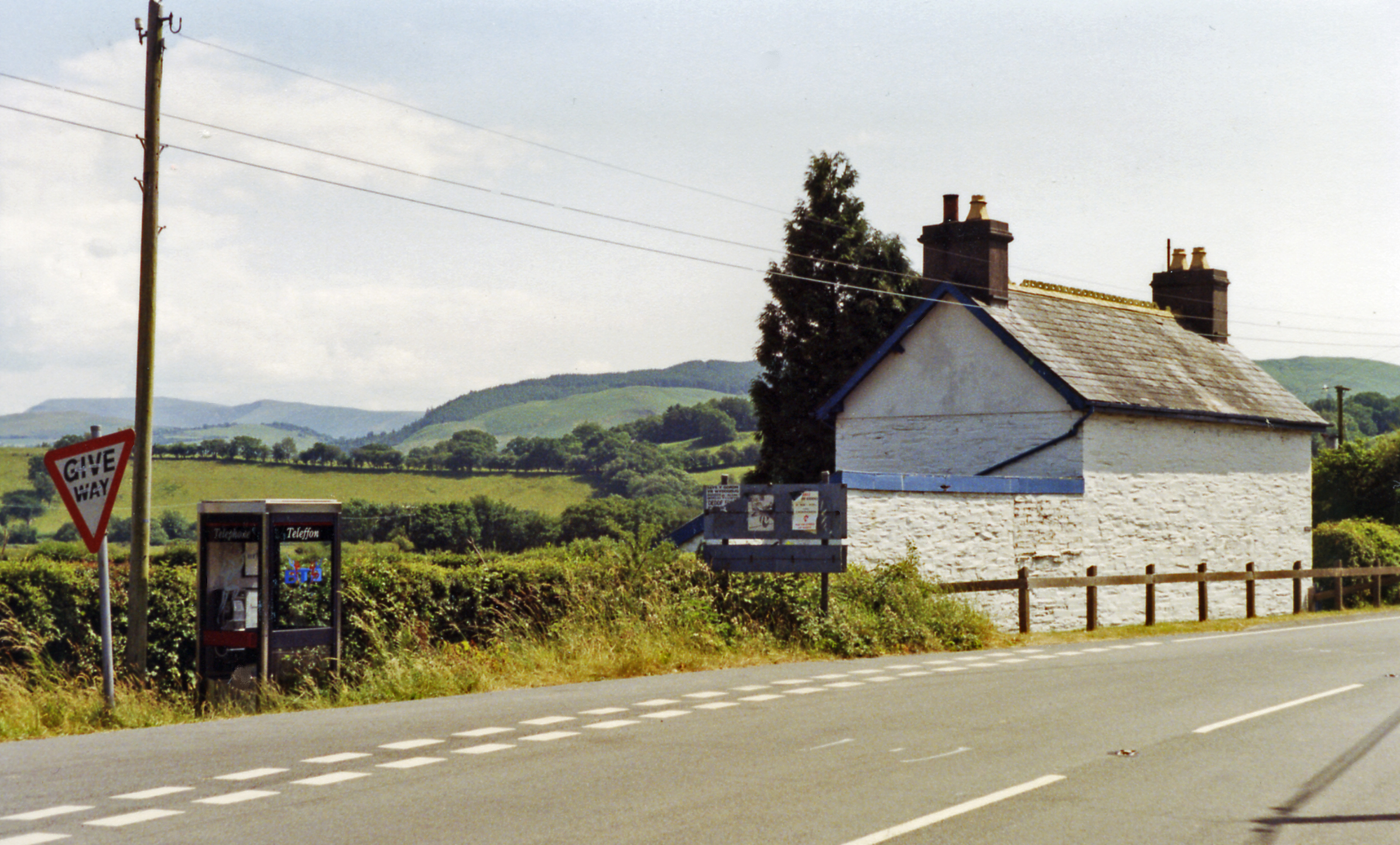
- Site of the station in 1992

General information
- Location: Wales

Other information
- Status: Disused

History
- Pre-grouping: Corris Railway
- Post-grouping: Great Western Railway (after 1930)

Key dates
- 25 August 1887: Opened
- 1 January 1931: Closed
Location

Ffridd Gate was a station on the Corris Railway in Merioneth (now Gwynedd), Wales, UK. It was built at the level crossing over the B4404 road to Llanwrin, near the hamlet of Fridd. A small hamlet also grew up around the station and a nearby (pre-existent) toll-house. The hamlet and former station are near to the confluence of the Afon Dulas and the River Dyfi, around 2 1/4 miles (3.6 km) west of the village of Llanwrin and 1 mile (1.6 km) north of the town of Machynlleth.

== History ==
Around 1830 a toll house was built at Ffridd Gate to control the south end of the turnpike road to Dolgellau – now the A487. When the Corris, Machynlleth & River Dovey Tramroad was built in 1859, it crossed the road to Llanwrin (now the B4404) and passed on the east side of the tollhouse before entering Ffridd Wood. The station, built in 1885, was on the south side of the level crossing and had a simple wooden shelter for passengers. There was no platform.

== Positioning ==
South of the station was the railway's bridge over the Dyfi, originally a wooden trestle construction and later a three-span steel bridge. The site of the bridge is now occupied by the Millennium Bridge for walkers and cyclists, providing a short-cut to Machynlleth.

The Centre for Alternative Technology lies about a mile north of the hamlet.

Preceding station	Disused railways	Following station
Machynlleth	Corris Railway	Llwyngwern
