= Machynlleth railway station (Corris Railway) =

Closed railway station in Wales

Coordinates: 52.5959°N 3.8549°W

Machynlleth
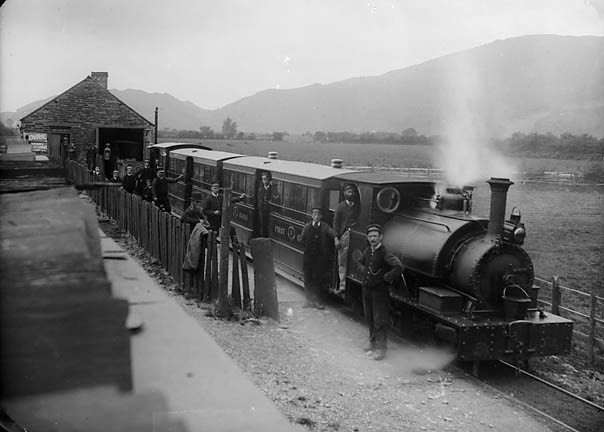
- The station in the 1890s

General information
- Location: Wales

Other information
- Status: Closed

History
- Pre-grouping: Corris Railway
- Post-grouping: Great Western Railway (after 1930)

Key dates
- 1863: Opened to freight (horse-drawn)
- 1878: Opened to passengers
- 1931: Closed to passengers
- 1948: Closed to freight

Machynlleth was a station on the Corris Railway in Merioneth (now Gwynedd), Wales. It was opened in 1863 as a pair of wharves for the transshipment of slate onto the Newtown and Machynlleth Railway. In 1878, it was opened to passenger traffic, replacing the earlier Machynlleth Town, and was adjacent to the standard gauge station of the same name. It closed to passengers in 1931, and to all traffic in 1948.

== History ==
The Corris Railway (originally called the Corris Machynlleth and River Dovey Tramroad) opened in 1858, connecting the slate quarries around Corris and Aberllefenni with river wharves at Derwenlas and Morben. It crossed the River Dyfi north of the town of Machynlleth and passed through the western part of the town. Initially goods and passengers used the Machynlleth Town station in The Garsiwn area of the town.

In early 1863, the Newtown and Machynlleth Railway (N&MR) opened their line to Machynlleth, ending at a new station on the north side of the town. Later that year, the Corris Railway paid for two long platforms next to sidings laid by the N&MR. These platforms were leased to the Aberllefenni and Ratgoed quarries who abandoned their river wharfs in favour of transshipping their slate to the N&MR. The other slate quarries that used the Corris leased additional platforms over the next two decades and the river wharves were no longer used by the end of the 1870s.

In 1874 the Corris built a goods warehouse and stable block on land bought from the Cambrian Railways who had by then acquired the N&MR. In 1878 the Corris Railway was relaid using steel rails in preparation for the introduction of steam locomotives. The goods warehouse was adapted into a passenger station.

The station building was poorly built and too small for the expanding passenger traffic on the railway. In the early 1900s, the Corris planned to replace it with a new much larger building. After swapping land with the Cambrian Railways, the original station was demolished in 1906 and replaced with a new much larger building which opened in 1907.

Passenger services on the Corris were withdrawn in 1931 shortly after the railway was taken over by the Great Western Railway. The station continued to be the main transshipment point for slate until the railway closed in 1948.

== After closure ==
The second station building in 2019, part of the Dyfi Eco-Park

The Corris Railway's station building survives in 2024. The rest of the station yard has been repurposed as the Dyfi Eco Park business park.

Preceding station	Disused railways	Following station
Machynlleth Town	Corris Railway	Ffridd Gate
