= Pantperthog =

Village in United Kingdom

Coordinates: 52.622°N 3.849°W

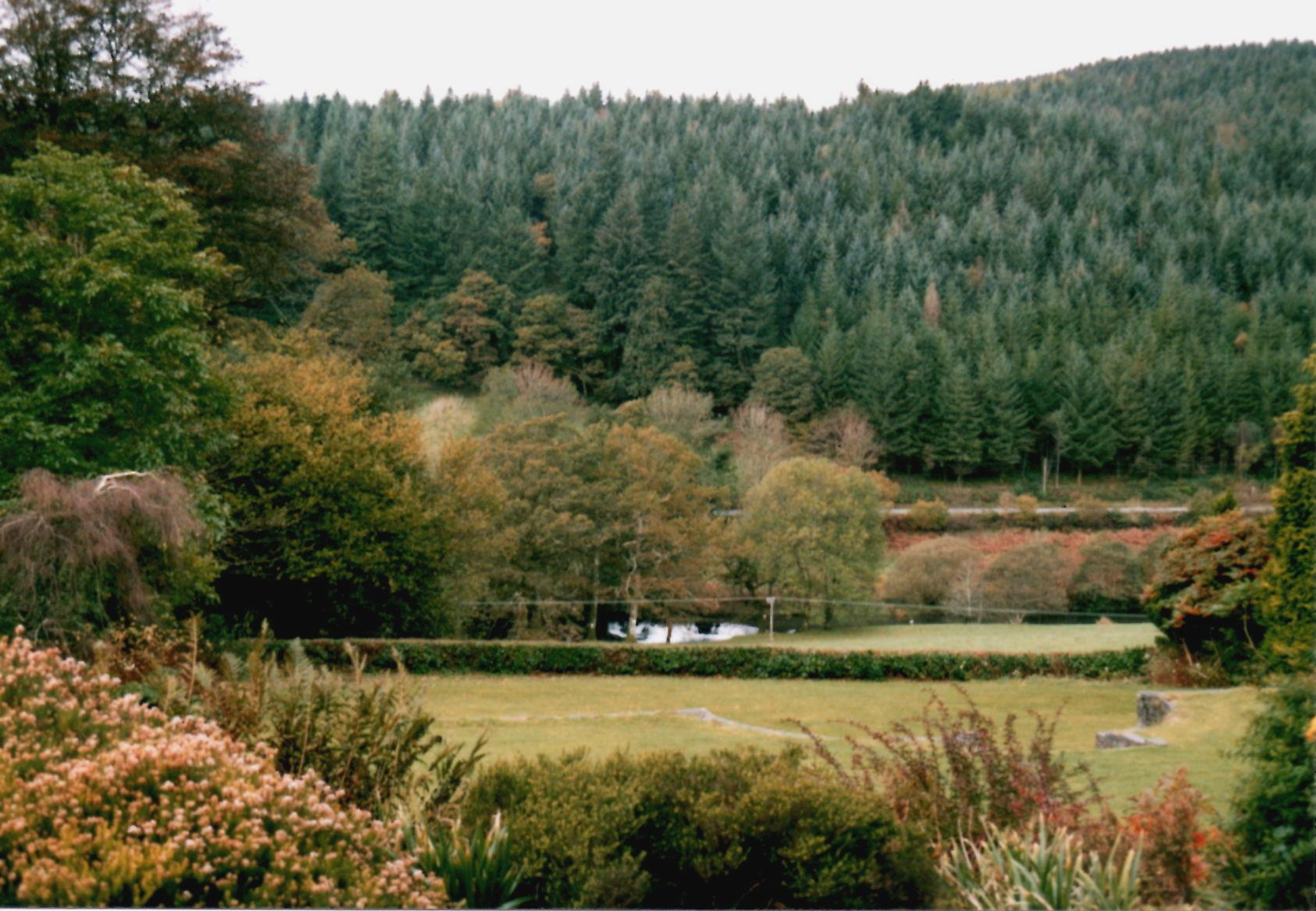
The Dyfi forest near Pantperthog, November 2006

Pantperthog is a hamlet in southern Gwynedd in Wales, 2 miles north of Machynlleth and 14 miles southeast of Dolgellau. Nearby is the former Llwyngwern quarry, which is now the Centre for Alternative Technology.

== Governance ==
Pantperthog is included in Corris community, south of that village, and alternate community council meetings are held in Pantperthog Village Hall. The community council system replaced the parish council system; the council tackles local issues and acts as a contact point between local government and residents for information and resource on many environmental, equality, ethnicity and gender issues and other matters.

== Forestry ==
The village has strong forestry connections, with part of the Dyfi Forest to the rear of the village.

== Transport ==
The A487 trunk road passes through Pantperthog en route to Machynlleth and Dolgellau.
