= Aberllefenni =

Village in Gwynedd, Wales

Coordinates: 52.673°N 3.819°W

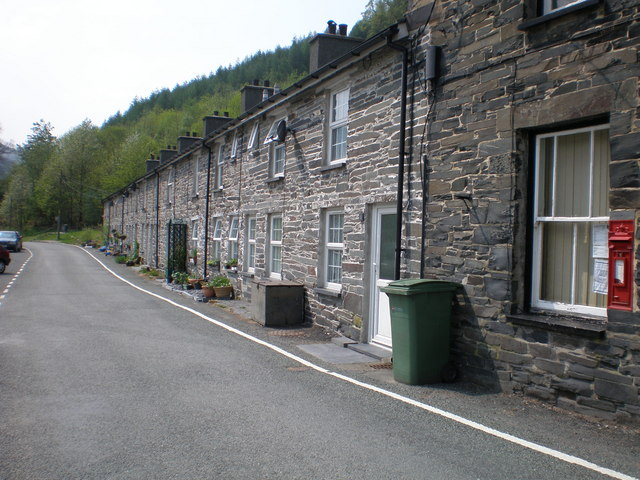
- Pensarn Terrace

- Location within Gwynedd
- OS grid reference: SH770097
- Community: Corris
- Principal area: Gwynedd
- Preserved county: Gwynedd
- Country: Wales
- Sovereign state: United Kingdom
- Post town: MACHYNLLETH
- Postcode district: SY20
- Dialling code: 01654
- Police: North Wales
- Fire: North Wales
- Ambulance: Welsh
- UK Parliament: Dwyfor Meirionnydd
- Senedd Cymru – Welsh Parliament: Gwynedd Maldwyn

Aberllefenni is a village in the south of Gwynedd, Wales. It lies in the historic county of Merionethshire, in the valley of the Afon Dulas, and in the community of Corris.

== History ==
Aberllefenni was built around the Aberllefenni quarries, which operated from as early as the 14th century. The village expanded rapidly when the Corris Railway opened in 1859. Economic hardships, failing demand, and both World Wars reduced output. Following World War II, the industry struggled, culminating in the final closing of the mine in 2003.

Sixteen houses and cottages owned by John Lloyd of Inigo Jones Slateworks, comprising almost the entire village, went up for sale in 2016 for £1.5 million. After their sale in October 2022 to Walsh Investment Properties, tenants were subject to evictions and the previously low rent was increased to "bring them in line with current market values".

== Government ==
The village has a community council. The current representatives are elected residents and the local councillor who often attends is John Pughe Roberts. The community council system replaced the old parish council system and tackles local issues, acts as a contact point between local government and residents for information and resource on matters including the environment, equality, ethnicity and gender.
