= Cyfrwy =

Coordinates: 52.699428°N 3.907032°W

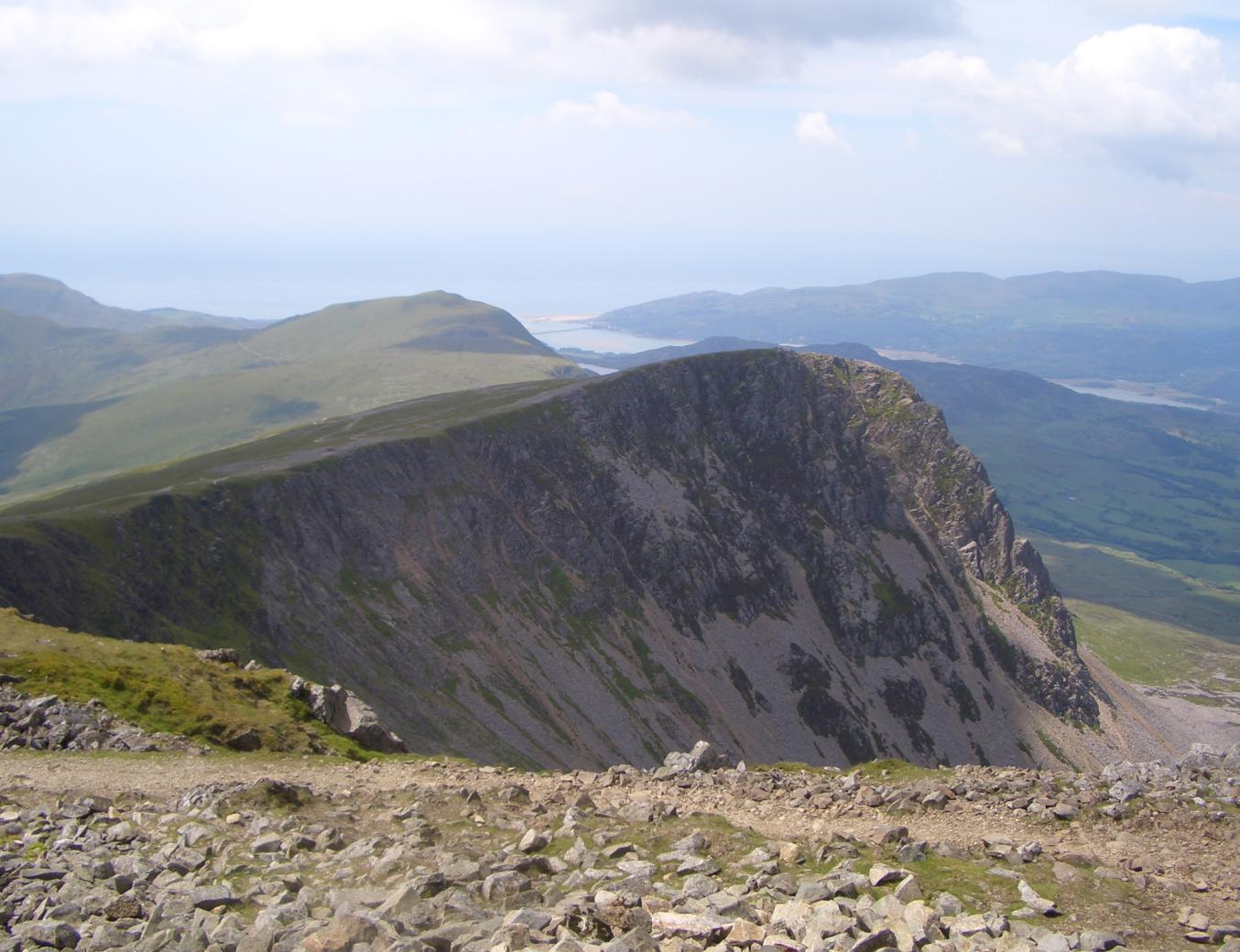
- Cyfrwy from Cadair Idris with Tyrrau Mawr behind

Highest point
- Elevation: 811 m (2,661 ft)
- Prominence: 36 m (118 ft)
- Parent peak: Cadair Idris
- Listing: Hewitt, Nuttall

Naming
- Language of name: Welsh

Geography
- Location: Gwynedd, Wales
- Parent range: Cadair Idris
- OS grid: SH711130
- Topo map: OS Landranger 124, Explorer OL23

Climbing
- Easiest route: Hike

Cyfrwy is a subsidiary summit of Cadair Idris in the Snowdonia National Park, in Gwynedd, northwest Wales. It lies to the west of Cadair Idris and is often climbed with Cadair Idris by taking the Pony Path.

The summit is bare and rocky and marked with a cairn. The north and east face has large cliffs. A rock climb/extreme scramble known as the Cyfrwy Arete is found here. This arete is very steep and rope and rock climbing skills will be needed. To the west is Tyrrau Mawr and Craig-y-llyn, while to the south is Craig Cwm Amarch.
