= Mynydd Llwyn-gwern =

Coordinates: 52°37′33″N 3°49′33″W

- The summit of Mynydd Llwyn-gwern with Mynydd Model beyond

Highest point
- Elevation: 269.2 m (883 ft)
- Prominence: 30 m (98 ft)

Naming
- Language of name: Welsh

Geography
- Location: Gwynedd, UK
- Parent range: Cadair Idris
- OS grid: SH 7650 0466

Mynydd Llwyn-gwern or Mynydd Llwyngwern is a mountain in southern Snowdonia, Wales. It lies above the Afon Dulas to the west and the Nant Ffrydlan to the east. The summit is noted for a series of low pillow mounds.

The Llwyngwern slate quarry on the west flank of the mountain operated from the 1820s until about 1950. In 1972, the quarry became the site for an experiment in green living. This has now developed into the Centre for Alternative Technology which occupies much of the quarry site. The centre built a wind turbine on the summit of Mynydd Llwyn-gwern.

It is one of the Dyfi hills.
