= Mynydd Moel =

Coordinates: 52.699428°N 3.907032°W

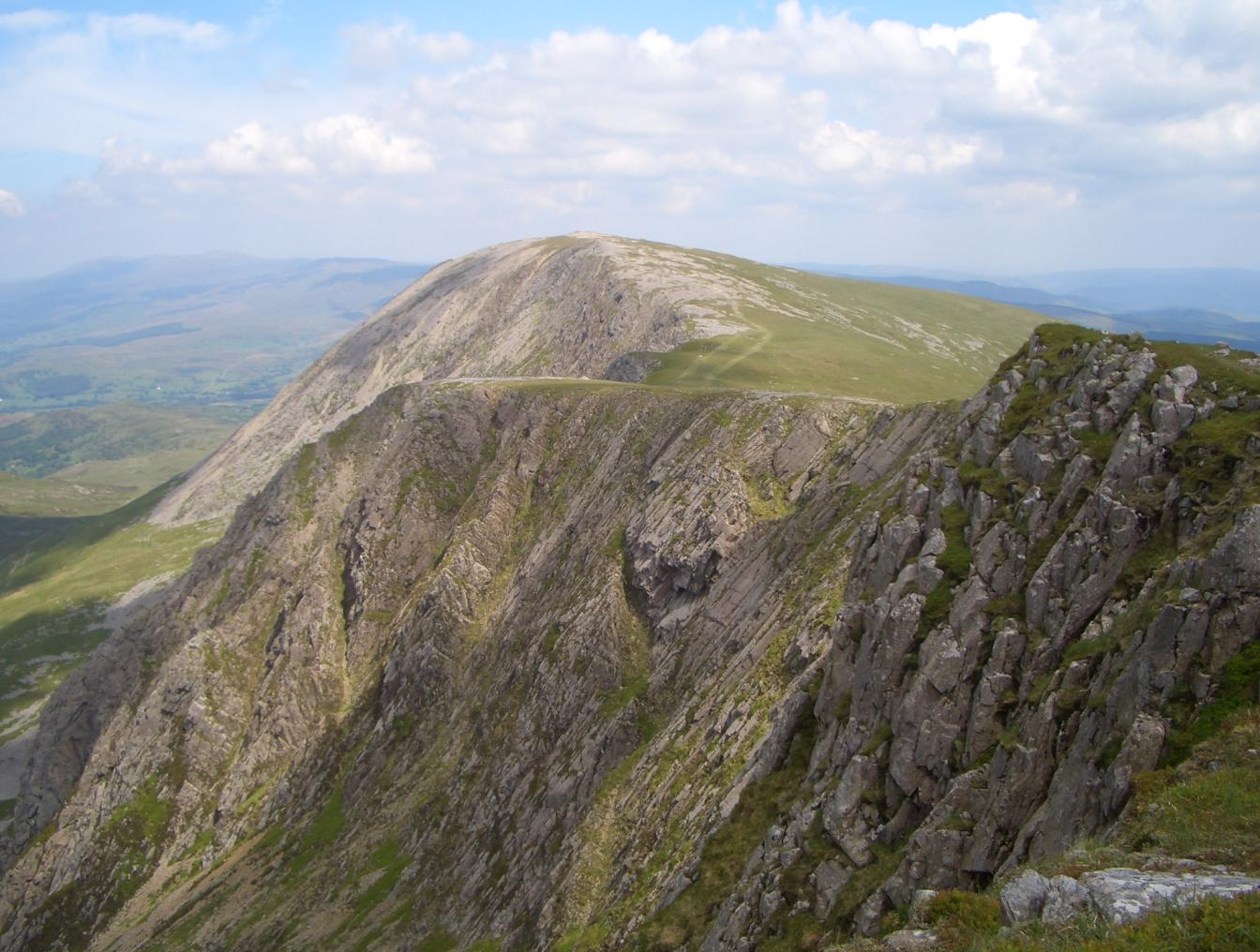
- Mynydd Moel from Cadair Idris

Highest point
- Elevation: 863 m (2,831 ft)
- Prominence: 67 m (220 ft)
- Parent peak: Cadair Idris
- Listing: Hewitt, Nuttall

Naming
- English translation: Bare Mountain
- Language of name: Welsh

Geography
- Location: Gwynedd, Wales
- Parent range: Cadair Idris
- OS grid: SH711130
- Topo map: OS Landranger 124, Explorer OL23

Climbing
- Easiest route: Hike

Mynydd Moel is the second highest summit of Cadair Idris in the Snowdonia National Park, in Gwynedd, northwest Wales.

== Geography ==
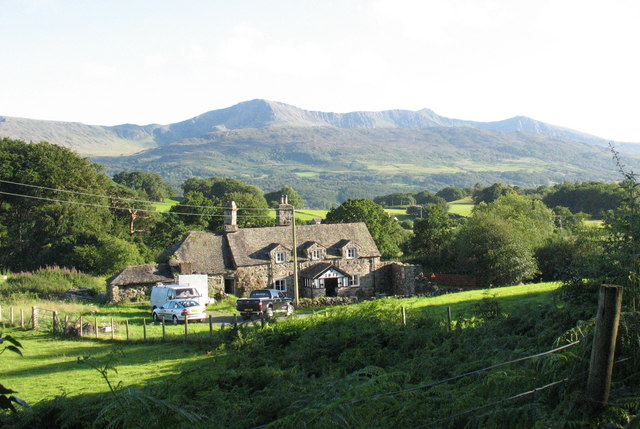
Mynydd Moel behind the Garth Bleuddyn cottage built by the Nannau estate

It lies to the east of Cadair Idris and is often climbed as a horseshoe along with Craig Cwm Amarch and Cadair Idris.

The summit is bare and rocky and marked with a cairn. The north face like Cadair Idris has large cliffs. To the east is a lower broad plateau topped by the summit of Gau Graig.
