= Gau Graig =

Coordinates: 52.699428°N 3.907032°W

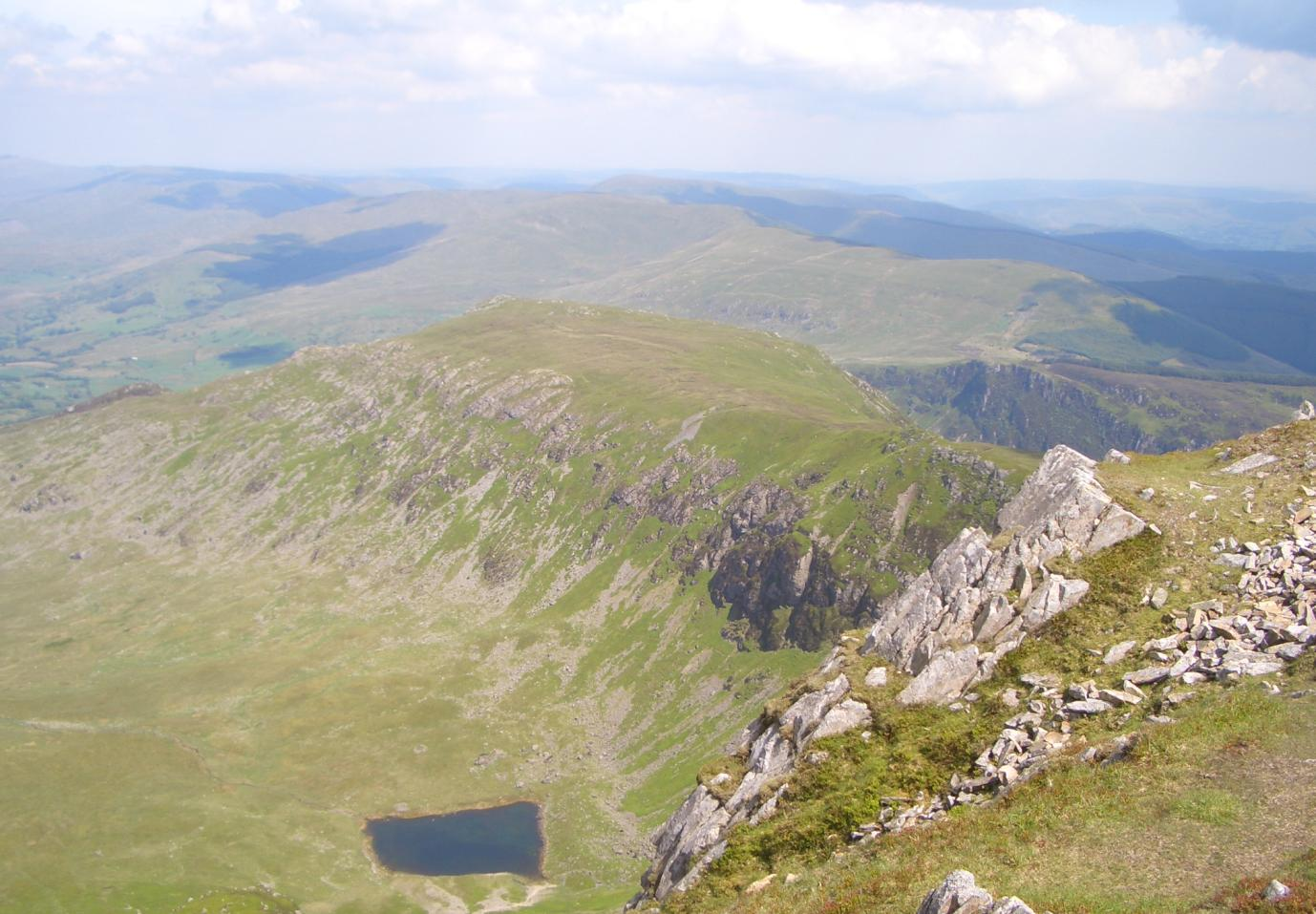
- The Gau Graig plateau from Mynydd Moel

Highest point
- Elevation: 684 m (2,244 ft)
- Prominence: 25 m (82 ft)
- Parent peak: Cadair Idris
- Listing: Deleted Hewitt, Nuttall

Naming
- Language of name: Welsh

Geography
- Location: Gwynedd, Wales
- Parent range: Cadair Idris
- OS grid: SH744141
- Topo map: OS Landranger 124, Explorer OL23

Climbing
- Easiest route: Hike

Gau Graig is a subsidiary summit of Cadair Idris in the Snowdonia National Park, in Gwynedd, northwest Wales. It lies to the east of Mynydd Moel on a broad grassy plateau. It marks the eastern end of the Cadair Idris ridge.

The summit is marked by a cairn. To the north are Y Garn and Diffwys, to the west Rhobell Fawr and Aran Fawddwy and to the south are Waun-oer and Cribin Fawr.
