= Sicambeni Rural University =

Sicambeni Rural University is an independently funded project in the village of Sicambeni (OR Tambo District Municipality) 15 km inland from Port St Johns on the East Coast of South Africa. The University is the brainchild of Luke Boshier and his volunteer program based in Port St. Johns.

== Overview ==
Sicambeni is in the old Transkei, an area made nominally independent under the old apartheid government and then forgotten and neglected. It still lags behind the rest of the country in development and progress.

Poverty and unemployment are at high levels and the need for a sustainable community model that can not only work but be spread and taught from community to community is a crucial stepping stone in rebuilding communities and regaining their connection with their land.

There are many immigrants from this area in cities including Durban (Northern sea port) and Port Elizabeth (Southern sea port) that left in search of an infrastructure within which they could exist, even if it means eking out a living on the fringes of the city and sending money back.

Boshier quit the restaurant industry to move into the field of rural development when he decided the modern environment was no longer healthy for him. He has massive experience in helping develop rural communities and, in particular, helps spread knowledge on building using unburnt bricks.

Boshiers idea of drying the bricks in the sun thereby saving hardwood trees that were being used to fire the kilns in Malawi was instrumental in preventing major deforestation. He is fascinated at how the people have changed along with the development of the gardens and small dam starting to look at their environment differently and finding ideas of their own to solve their own problems.

“Changing people and their beliefs and perspectives of themselves and where they fit into the bigger picture is what this all about. They’re learning and growing to an extent where they can pass it on to others. The key to this project is not simply to give away money as that simply creates a dependence on the giver.”

Starting off with the basics of improving waste and water management and setting out areas for planting seeds the project has yielded crops as diverse as cabbage, spinach, radish, chilies, lettuce and various types of squash and herbs.

It also boasts a small dam dug by the workers to catch the rainwater runoff from the spring rains that came in September.

There is a fledgling brick making operation as well as coffee seeds planted with a growing area laid out for a plantation.

The University focuses on helping the local communities stop major migration from the country to the cities in search of work by getting them back to a state of sustaining themselves off the lands as well as making a profit from cash crops in order to bring some cash back into the villages.

The University is up and running, growing daily it is still a work in progress and not being a government project, requires funding from investors and partners.

== From small beginnings ==
Sicambeni Rural University succeeded with the first garden helped by the small dam created by community workers. The success prompted further interest from the community and further land on the other side of the small river was released for the use of the volunteer program.

One of the initial ideas of the program was brick making but due to a lack of manpower as well as the proper mix of sand it was discontinued. However, this part of the program is due for another kick start in July 2008.

Volunteers come and go. Many stay for longer than intended but all take something away with them. The education in life skills in the community is not something limited to the community members as it has become a two-way street.

Originally members of the program and volunteers stayed at Amapondo Backpackers at Second Beach. As the volunteer core grew bigger they were moved to The Jetty alongside the Umzimvubu river in tranquil surroundings.

Recent developments have seen the project crew spending more time up in Sicambeni Village at the outdoor University, living the projects they are putting together. The possibility of a permanent move has been discussed but no date has yet been set.

The Jetty saw time as a home base as well as the location for a massive compost heap courtesy of fruit donated from the local Boxer supermarket. The ultimate aim of Amapondo Projects is, to create a sustainable community in Sicambeni that can survive food price increase and food shortages by preparing and planning to successfully live off the land.

In the process, the projects crew have been doing a similar kind of thing with gardens up at Forest Glade near the Jetty supplying them with plenty of fresh produce.

The Sicambeni Community that learn and understand how the sustainable ethos works can then in turn teach others. It is an old concept of spreading an idea but it is also one with projects and the Sicambeni Rural University where each member of the community has a vested interest, their own survival away from a dependence on handouts from business or government.

== New crops are introduced ==
The initial crops planted were too focused on leafy vegetables and needed a dose of root vegetables to enable the community to have a staple, balanced diet. Potatoes and carrots as well as rice and sorghum were planted.

== Sustainability as an achievable goal. ==
People have been living off the land for centuries, even millennia and the only thing that has changed is the culture of handouts from government and big business that breeds a culture of dependence amongst rural people who would otherwise be quite capable of sustaining themselves by living off the land.

The project has managed to instill a pride and a return of dignity to people who are experiencing, many for the first time, that they can take ownership of their lives, make decisions and contribute in a community that can sustain itself and its members.

The aim of this venture is to build a sustainable village project that not only supports itself but is a foundation for moving into surrounding communities and spreading the idea at the same time as planting seeds in the ground.

Regaining a place in the earth cycle and ending a process of simply being a consumer is the key to building sustainable and productive communities in rural Africa. The engrained feeling of being a victim and floating along at the mercy of the ebb and flow of human dynamics that one has no control over has been the lot of the citizens of Africa and other third world countries for decades.

Decisions made by multinational corporations and 1st world countries regarding trade, the environment, agriculture and economic control of the planet seldom include African and other 3rd world problems in the decision making process.

This is a top down system and makes no space for revitalization and empowerment from the bottom up. Arbitrary decisions based on politics, ego and building a specific brand with advertising on 4x4 motor vehicles do not contribute to finding lasting and sustainable solutions to poverty, starvation, unemployment and the other scourges that beset Africa and the 3rd world.

In order to address this gulf, that separates not only decision making processes but also the list of priorities that potential communities at the bottom work with compared to their well off counterparts at the top, it is necessary for people to forge their own progress around communities built around people and not political agendas.

Choices made by the community and built on are an important empowering factor in freeing people from a dependence on factors beyond their control. From this freedom stems a direct increase in self belief and identity with a community, a cause that is greater than the individual.

This vision of a living, dynamic community organism can be a living model for the whole being greater than the sum of its parts.

== Influences and inspiration ==
Masanobu Fukuoka

== See also ==
- Centre for Appropriate Rural Technology
