= Idris Gawr =

King of Meirionnydd

Idris Gawr (English: Idris the Giant; c. 560 – 632) was a king of Meirionnydd in early medieval Wales. He is also sometimes known by the patronymic Idris ap Gwyddno (Idris son of Gwyddno). Although now known as Idris Gawr, (Idris the Giant) this may be an error and he may have originally been known as "Idris Arw" (Idris the Coarse). He was apparently so large that he could sit on the summit of Cadair Idris and survey his whole kingdom.

Cadair Idris, a Welsh mountain, literally means "Chair of Idris". Idris was said to have studied the stars from on top of it and it was later reputed to bestow either madness or poetic inspiration on whoever spent a night on its summit. According to John Rhys, there were three other giants in the Welsh tradition along with Idris; these were Ysgydion, Offrwm, and Ysbryn – and each of them is said to have a mountain named after him somewhere in the vicinity of Cadair Idris. Another story has Idris seated in his chair plucking irritating grit from his shoe and throwing it down to the valley below, where it formed the three large boulders seen there till this day.

The historical Idris is thought to have been killed during a battle with Oswald of Northumbria near the River Severn around 632, although the Welsh annals merely state he was strangled in the same year. He may have retired to the mountain as a hermit, but if that was the case, he must have re-entered secular life to do battle. His grave, Gwely Idris, is said to be somewhere up on the mountain. However he died, he seems to have been succeeded by his son Sualda.
