= Centre for Appropriate Rural Technology =

- Formation: 1 January 1994
- Type: Sustainability, Technology
- Purpose: Research and application of sustainable village
- Location: Sicambeni Village, Port St Johns, OR Tambo District Municipality, Eastern Cape, South Africa
- Website: cartsa.co.za

The Centre for Appropriate Rural Technology (CART) is a community-driven sustainable development project located in the Eastern Cape of South Africa. It functions as a life skills centre in the heart of Sicambeni Village, a rural village near Port St Johns.

== Background ==
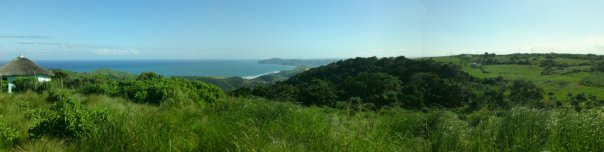

The Eastern Cape is South Africa's poorest region and has for many years been a victim of massive skill loss due to the migration of workers to the larger cities in seek of work. Invariably these migrants find themselves living in the already overcrowded Township (South Africa) compounding South Africa's desperate slum culture. Having accrued 15 years of experience working in several African Countries, building communities with the homeless, CART was formed as a centre to tackle poverty in a more holistic way. CART aims to give the local population the skills and technology to allow them to live self-sustainably without the need to seek work outside of their own villages, ultimately allowing the migrants to return to their homelands.

== Goals ==
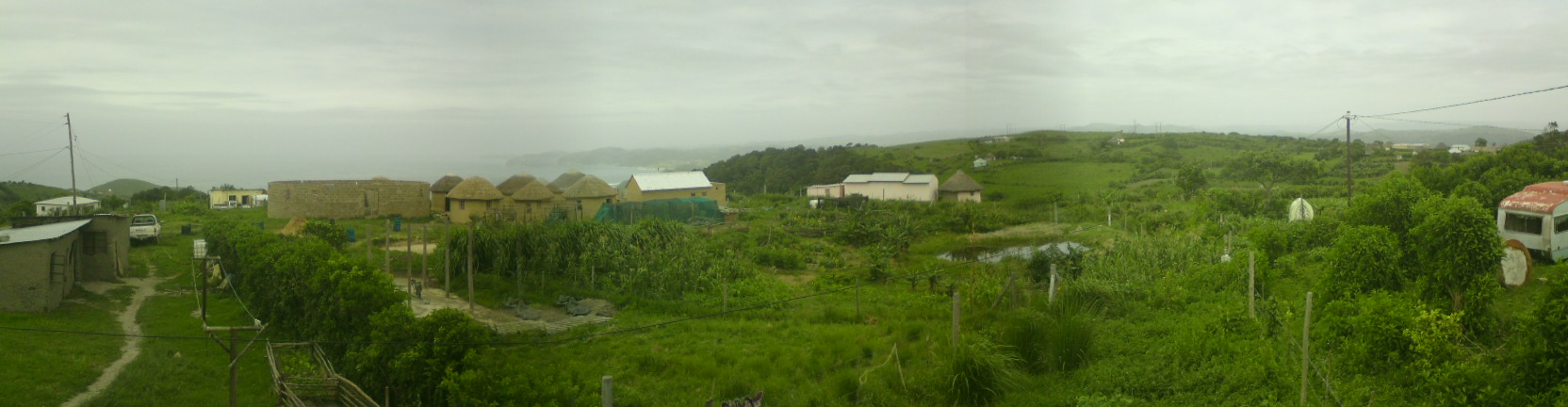

CART's primary goal is to complete the self sustainable model, serving as the epicentre to the surrounding village of over four hundred families. Technology developed here is being taught to and implemented within the community to produce a fully sustainable village. CART ensures that any technology implemented can be replicated in other rural environments, allowing this sustainable village to become a living example to other communities around South Africa and Globally.

CART operates numerous other initiatives, including innovative farming techniques, to provide much needed nutritional enrichment and a HIV support group offering nutritional, physical and spiritual healing.

== Technologies ==
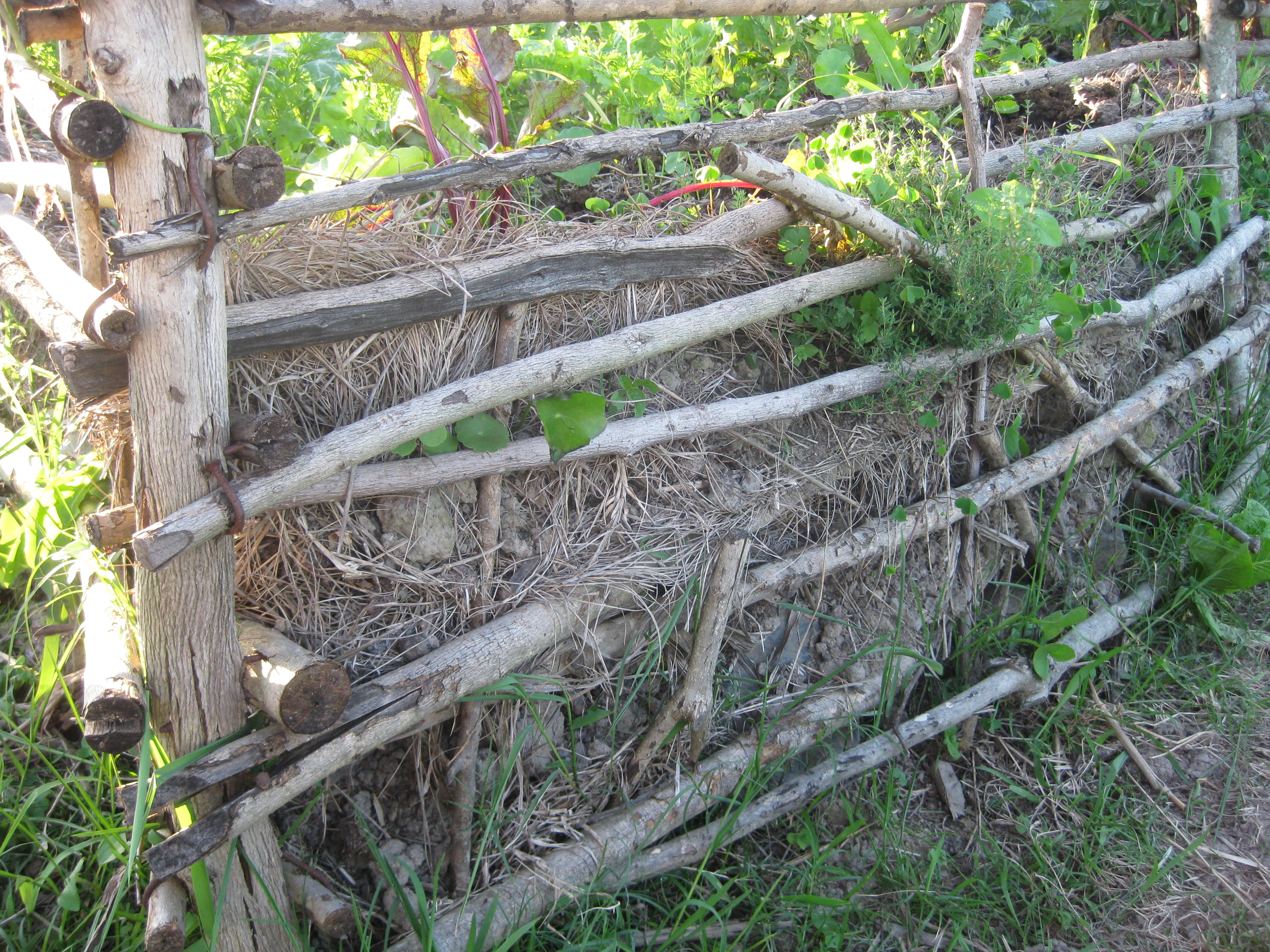

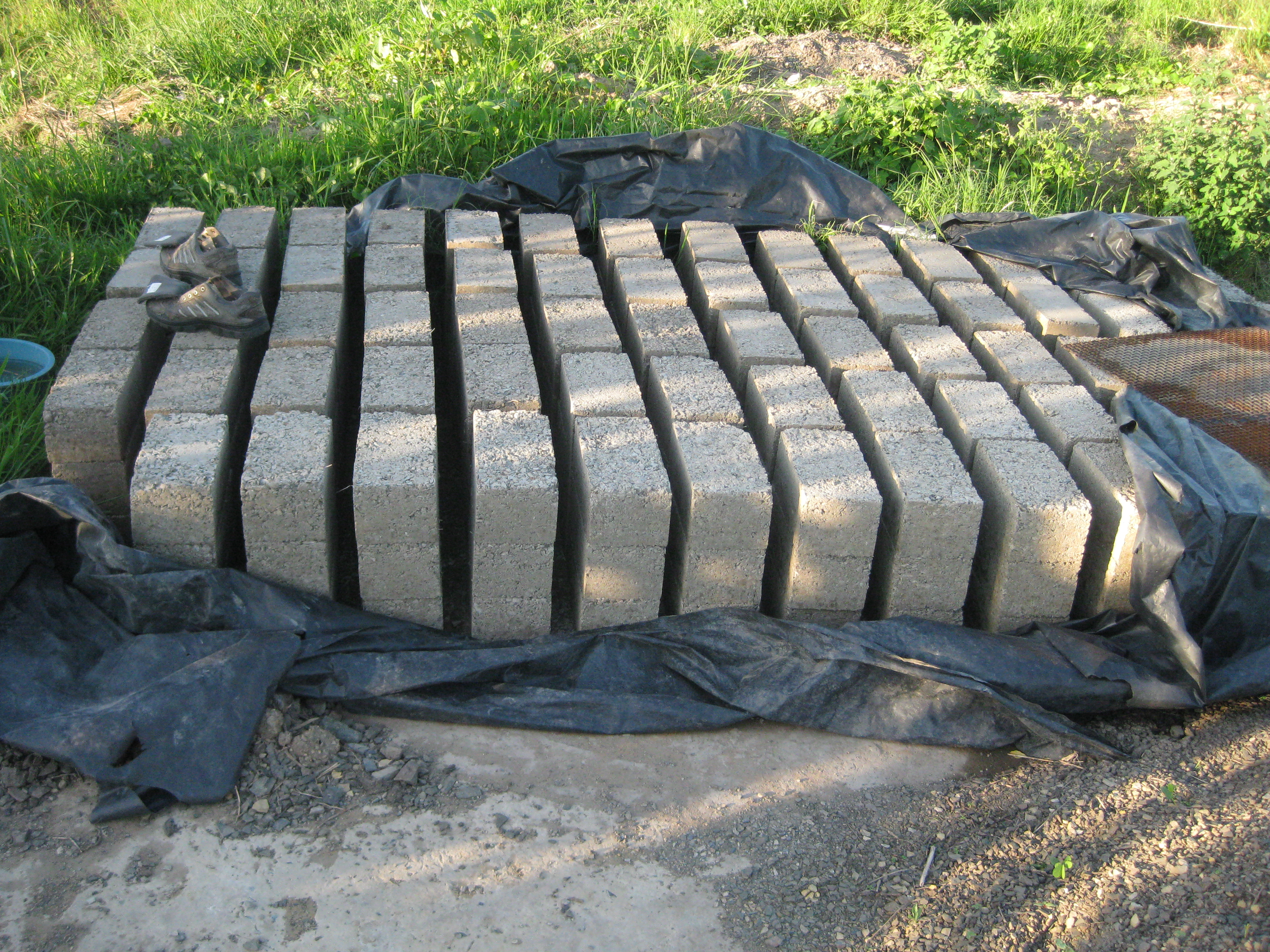

One of the primary goals of CART is to experiment with and implement technologies that can be used sustainably in a rural environment. This includes effective water, waste, energy and building systems.

=== Aerated beds ===
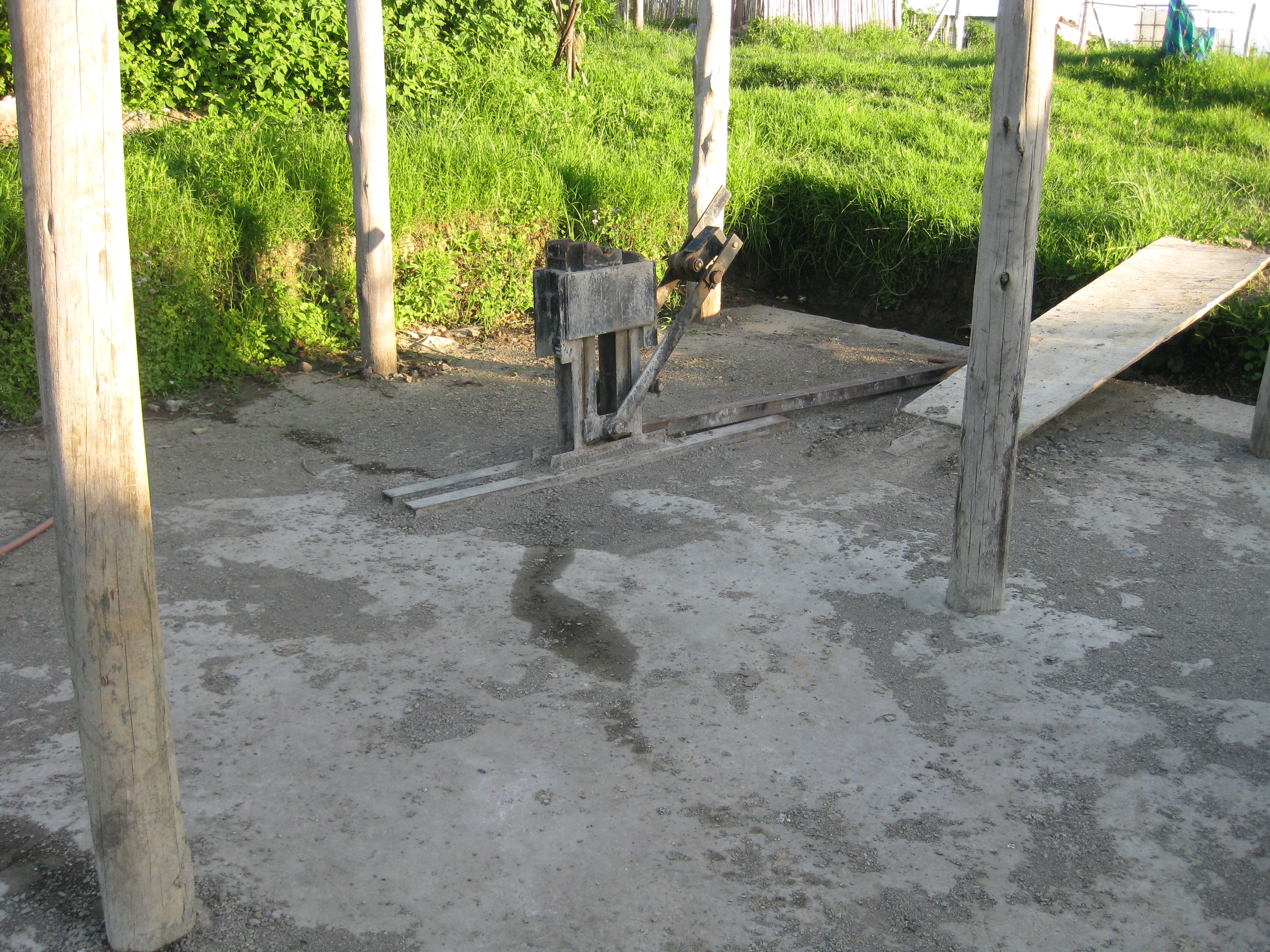

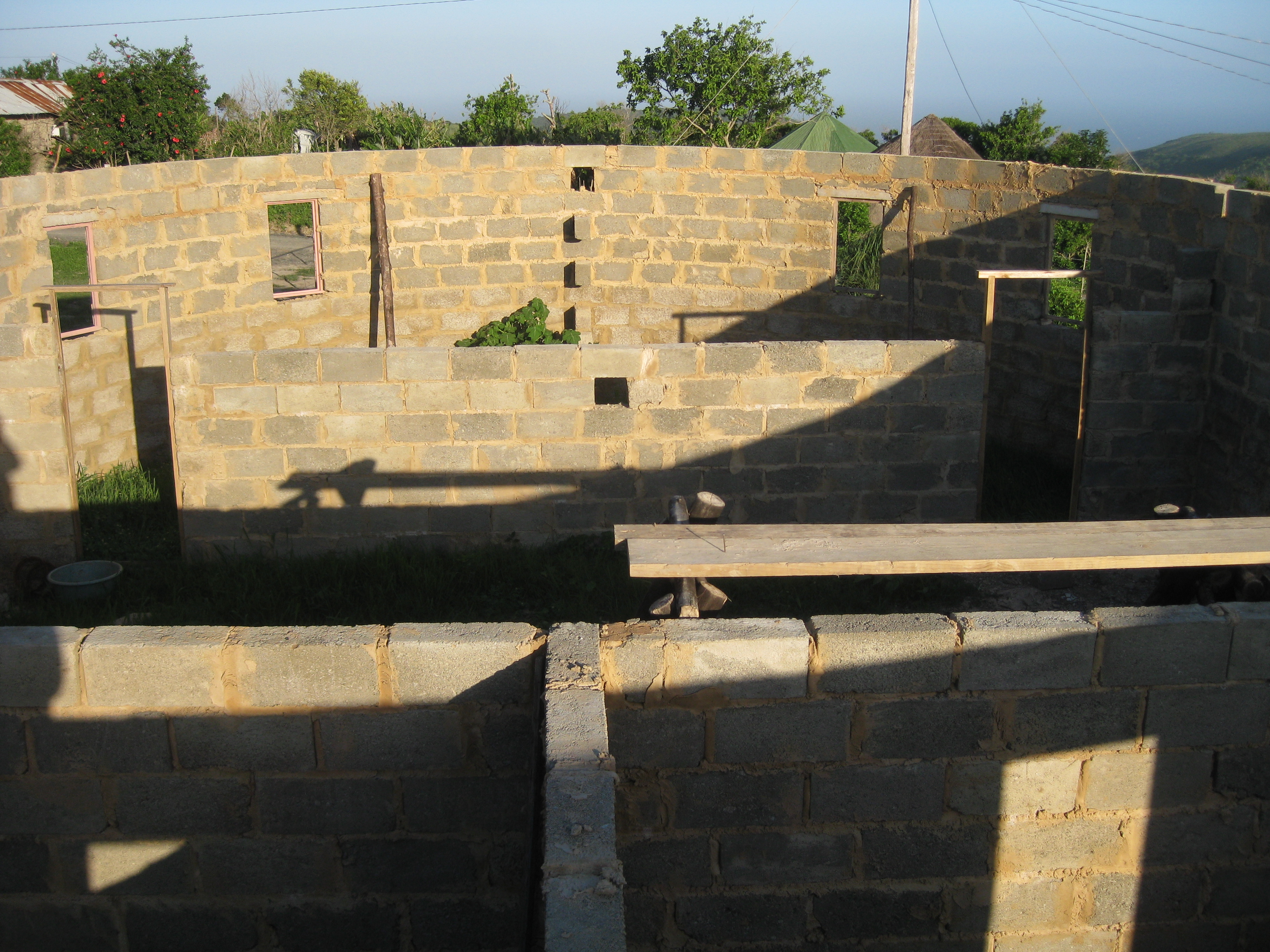

The aerated, raised beds can be implemented anywhere but are ideally suited to areas that have high clay content in the soil structure. Though clay-rich soil is ideal for keeping nutrients in the soil, it can also retain too much water. The raised structure design allows better drainage, minimizes the threat of root rot, and enables rooting vegetables (carrots, beets, onions, etc.) to grow significantly larger than when planted in the ground. The structure's unique shape also makes monitoring the fertility easier and the overall planting surface is greatly improved.

The garden resembles a compost heap with green matter placed on the very bottom of the structure, which is made from lengths of thin poles (latte). Decomposed material (wood chips, leaves, etc.) is layered on top of the green matter, followed by a mix of soil and compost. Seedlings are planted and mulched on top of the bed while herbs are planted on the sides, creating a network of strong roots to help contain the soil in the garden structure.

=== Brick machine ===
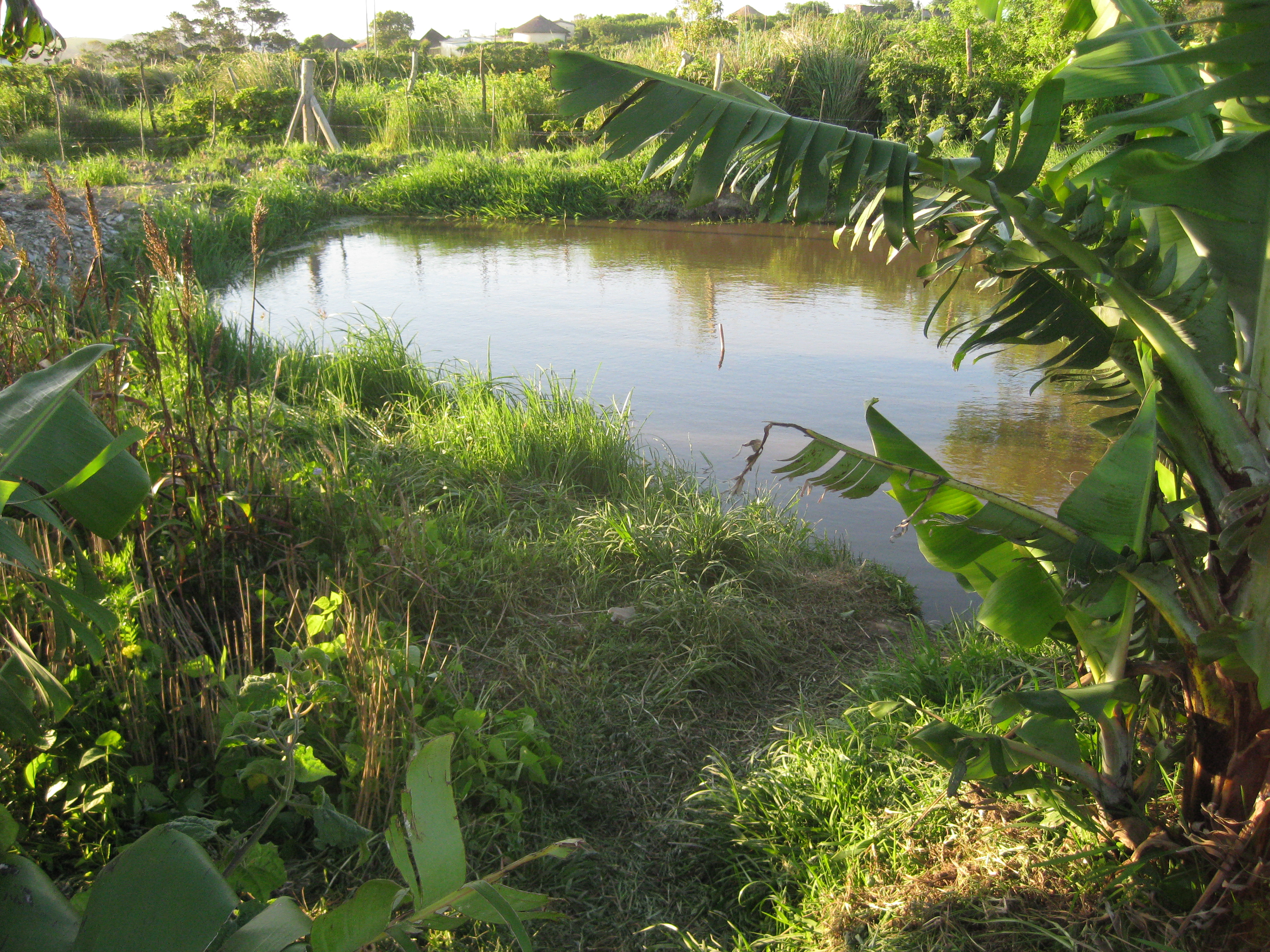

A hand-operated mechanical press creates stabilised bricks. Clay based soil mixed with five percent cement is used to form the base of the bricks.

=== Dams ===
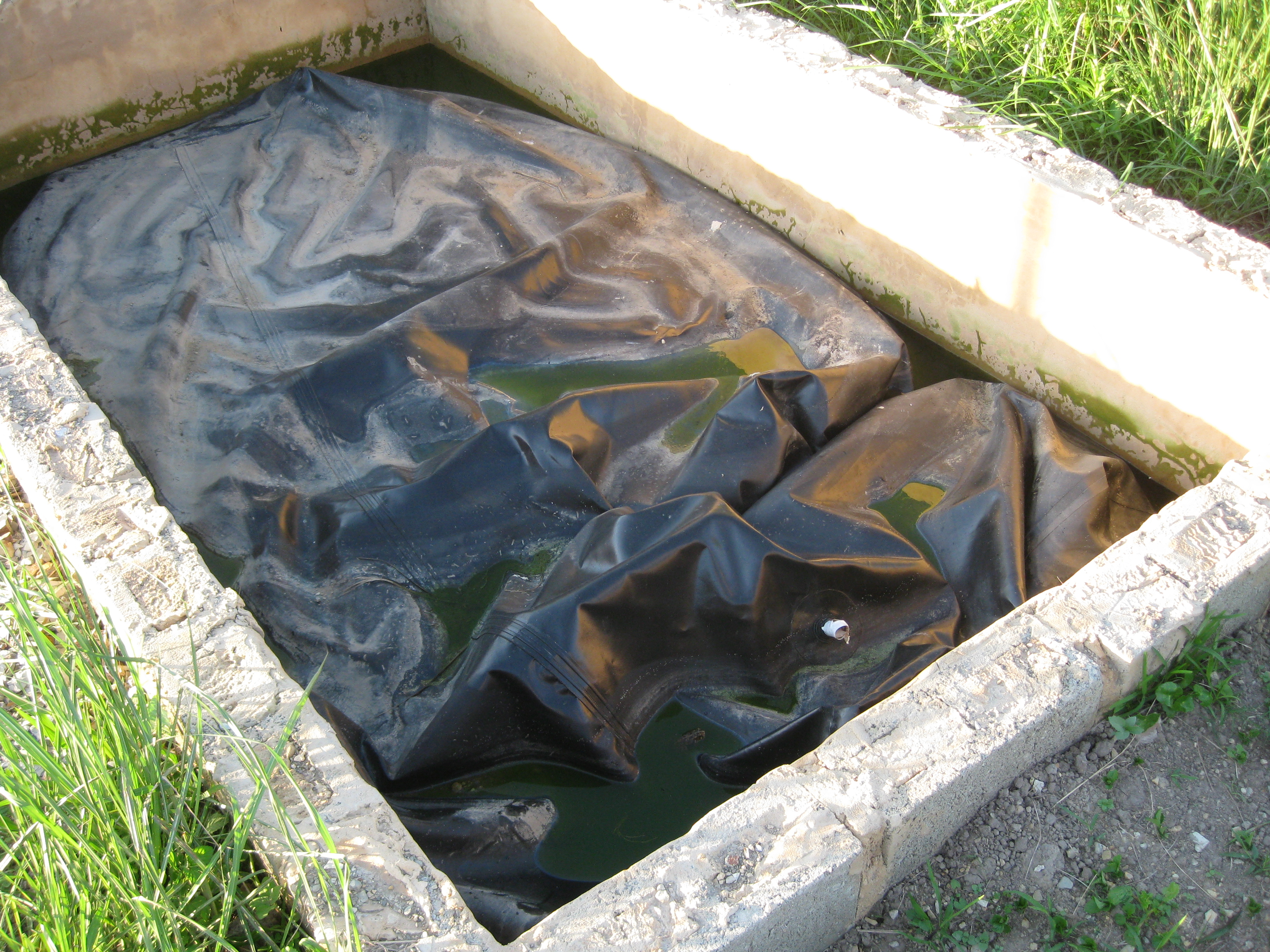

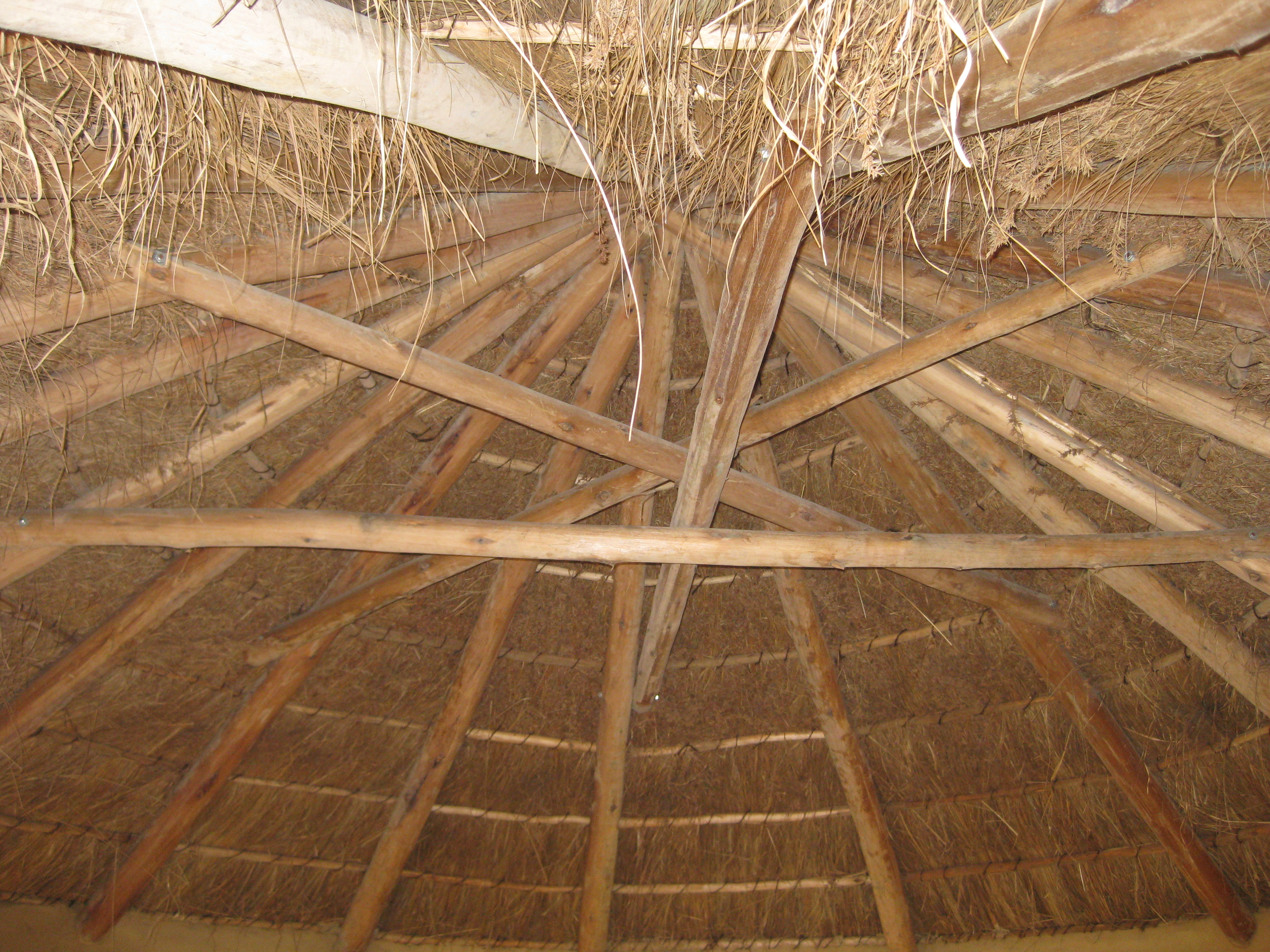

Water management problems mean that only one crop per year is grown. Sometime the community has little choice but to drink from contaminated rivers. The project aims to improve on this by using year round planting and more effective water management techniques.

=== Biodigester ===
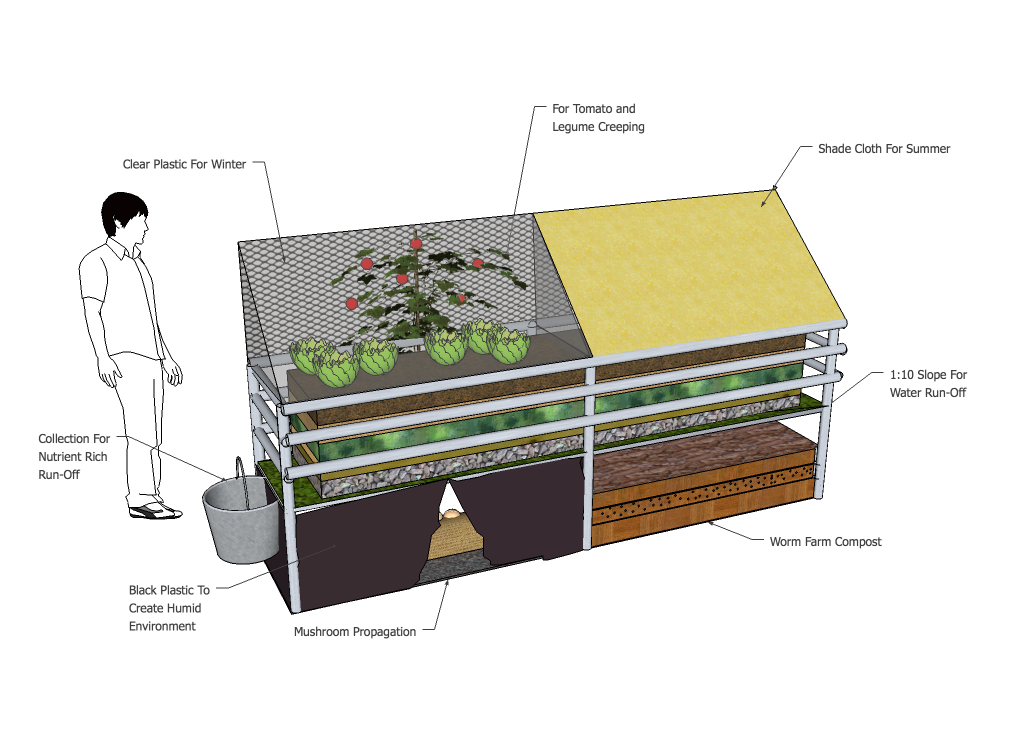

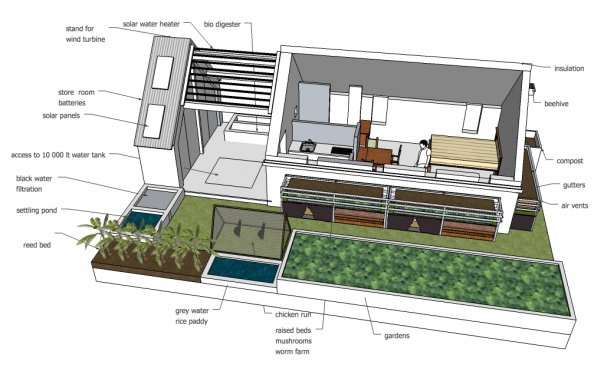

One of the most common problems facing rural communities around the world is that of waste disposal. The incorrect disposal of animal and human waste can lead to the poisoning of waterways, render land un-farmable and cause numerous fatal diseases such as Cholera, Typhoid and Diphtheria. CART needed a way to not only dispose of its waste but also to find a way of actually making this waste useful. After much research it was decided that a Biodigester could provide the solution to this problem, however no design existed that could be cheaply replicated in rural areas – so CART made one. Conventional Biodigesters cost in the region of US$30,000, CART's costs about US$500.

The simple design consists of a hole 7m x 1.5m x 1.5m into which a reinforced PVC cylindrical black bag is placed. At one end is the 'inlet' situated at the bottom of the bag, a pipe from the toilet block brings all human waste into the bag together with a hatch for animal and kitchen waste. Two outlet pipes are situated at the other end of the bag, one at the top for gas removal the other is 1/3 of the way up for liquid removal. The design incorporates a black colour so as to attract solar heat to accelerate decomposition. The placement of the outlet pipe is important as it is necessary to maintain 1/3 liquids : 2/3 gas.

Due to the sealed nature of the bag all this waste begins to decompose anaerobically releasing methane gas, water and sludge waste whilst also killing harmful pathogens such as E-Coli. The methane gas is released and captured using the valve at the top of the outlet end of the bag, this gas can be used for cooking, lighting and heating (although CART currently intend to use the gas solely for cooking.) The water is released through the outlet pipe, this water is known as 'High nutrient' or 'Black' water. Less than 10% of the products are solids and therefore only need removing from the bag every few years, these solids can be used as a high nutrient fertiliser for fruit trees or for plants where the fertiliser does not come into direct contact with the crop. The black water is mixed with grey waters, such as shower or washing water (N.B CART only uses organic, bio-degradable washing products to ensure no toxins are introduced to the cycle.) This water is filtered through sand and charcoal and used to irrigate the food gardens. Excess water, together with runoff from the gardens is collected in the Dam, from which it can be used to water gardens in the dry season or filtered further making it safe for drinking (see water cycle).

=== Indoor gardens ===
The indoor garden is a conceptual design for a compact, portable garden that can be put in almost any living space. Ideally, the garden would be put under a south-facing window (in the northern hemisphere), and would provide enough food to sustain a family.

== See also ==
- Appropriate technology
- Centre for Alternative Technology
- Sicambeni Rural University
