= Wales Institute for Sustainable Education =

Educational institute

Coordinates: 52°37′20.86″N 3°50′29.55″W

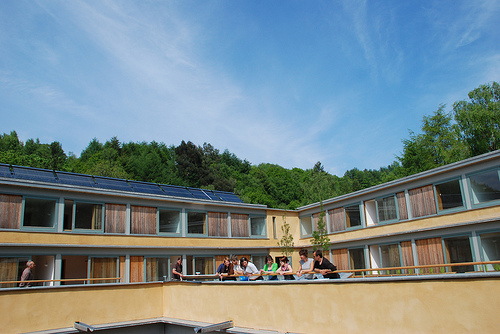
The Wales Institute for Sustainable Education

The Wales Institute for Sustainable Education (WISE) is an educational building located at the Centre for Alternative Technology near Machynlleth, Powys, Wales. It was designed as a case study for sustainable architecture and green building and has won several awards.

== Design and construction ==
The building was designed by architects Pat Borer and David Lea and inaugurated in June 2010. It contains a 200-seat lecture theatre, offices, teaching rooms and 24 en-suite bedrooms. WISE was designed to demonstrate the use of ecological building principles such as passive solar building design and heat recovery ventilation and uses building materials which have a low embodied energy.

The main materials used in constructing the building were wood, hemp, lime and rammed earth. The external walls of the building are made from 500mm thick hempcrete, and the 7.2m high walls of the lecture theatre consist of 320t of rammed earth.

A building management system is used to monitor a wide variety of parameters inside the building, providing data for research projects by CAT's sustainable architecture students.

== Use ==
The building is used for teaching a wide variety of short courses, and postgraduate university degrees through the Centre for Alternative Technology's Graduate School for the Environment, including Master's degree level courses in renewable energy and sustainable architecture.

The centre has run a Professional Diploma in Architecture course in Advanced Environmental and Energy Studies, since 2008, which allows students to obtain an accredited Part II architectural qualification.

== Awards ==
In 2010, the WISE building was awarded the first place in the Daily Telegraph's list of Top 10 Buildings 2010 and came 4th in The Guardian's Top 10 list of buildings for 2010. The building also won a Royal Institute of British Architects (RIBA) Award in 2011 and was highly commended by the judges for the gold medal for Architecture at the 2011 National Eisteddfod of Wales.
