= Centre for Alternative Technology =

Eco-centre in Powys, Wales

Coordinates: 52°37′20.86″N 3°50′29.55″W

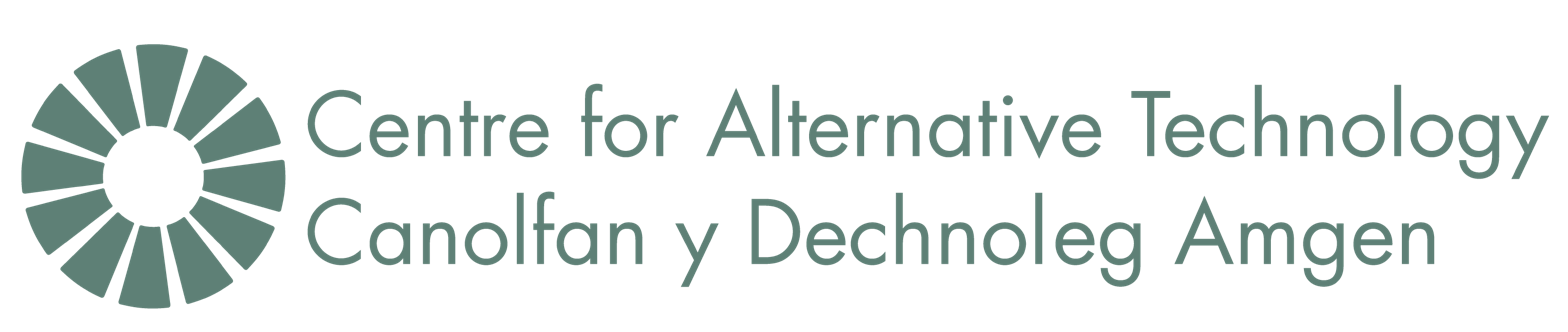

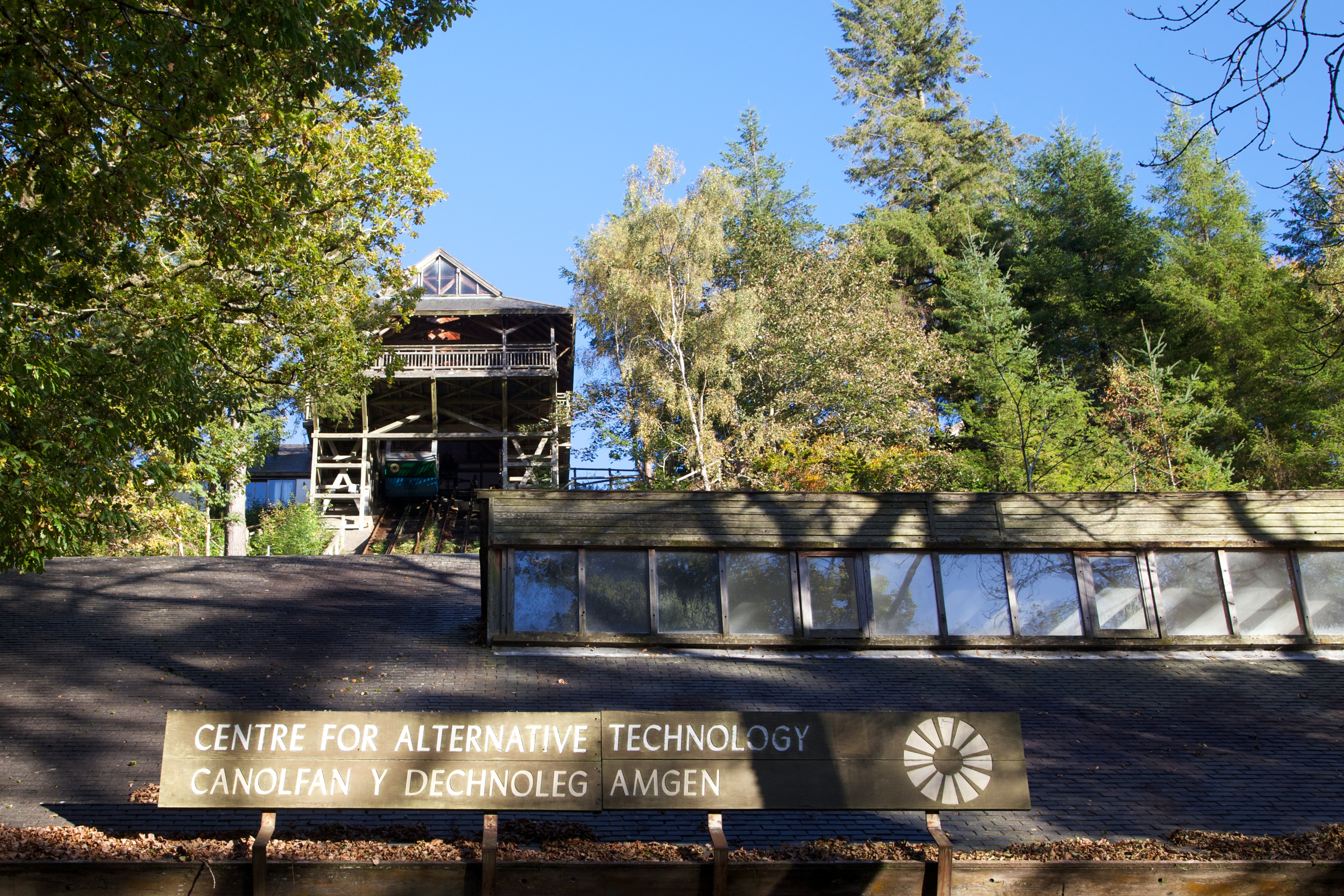
- Abbreviation: CAT
- Formation: November 1973
- Founder: Gerard Morgan-Grenville
- Legal status: Registered charity
- Purpose: To inspire, inform and enable humanity to respond to the climate and biodiversity emergency.
- Location: Montgomeryshire, Powys, Wales
- Website: cat.org.uk

The Centre for Alternative Technology (CAT) (Welsh: Canolfan y Dechnoleg Amgen) is a charity and eco-centre in Montgomeryshire, Powys, Wales dedicated to demonstrating and teaching sustainable development. CAT, despite its name, no longer concentrates its efforts exclusively on alternative technology, but provides information on all aspects of sustainable living.

CAT is open to group visitors, offers postgraduate degrees as well as short courses, and publishes information on renewable energy, sustainable architecture, organic farming, gardening, and sustainable living. CAT also runs education programmes for schools and visiting universities, businesses, community groups and any other group who would benefit for a visit to CAT to explore sustainability education. CAT is a membership organisation with a large and engaged supporter base. CAT’s Clean Slate magazine is a quarterly update on CAT’s work and wider sustainability education.

== History ==
CAT was founded by businessman-turned-environmentalist Gerard Morgan-Grenville, and opened in 1973 in the disused Llwyngwern slate quarry near Machynlleth (once served by the narrow-gauge Corris Railway), where it occupies a seven-acre (28,000 m^{2}) site. The organisation was originally known as the "National Centre for Alternative Technology". Inspiration for the early CAT pioneers included the then-recent books Small Is Beautiful, A Blueprint for Survival, and The Limits to Growth as well as an aim to explore alternative ways of living.

CAT was previously aligned to the Urban Centre for Appropriate Technology (UCAT), which was based in Bristol and has since evolved into the Centre for Sustainable Energy.

David Lea and Pat Borer won the Gold Medal for Architecture at the National Eisteddfod of Wales of 2001 for their work on the AtEIC building at the CAT, and an RIBA Regional Award for the WISE building in 2011.

== Visitor centre ==
Originally opening in 1975, CAT’s visitor centre is open to pre-booked group visits and is full of interactive displays and working examples of renewable energy, green building, organic gardens, biodiversity and more. Schools, universities, community groups, businesses and more come to CAT to learn about these topic areas. It is a registered charity.

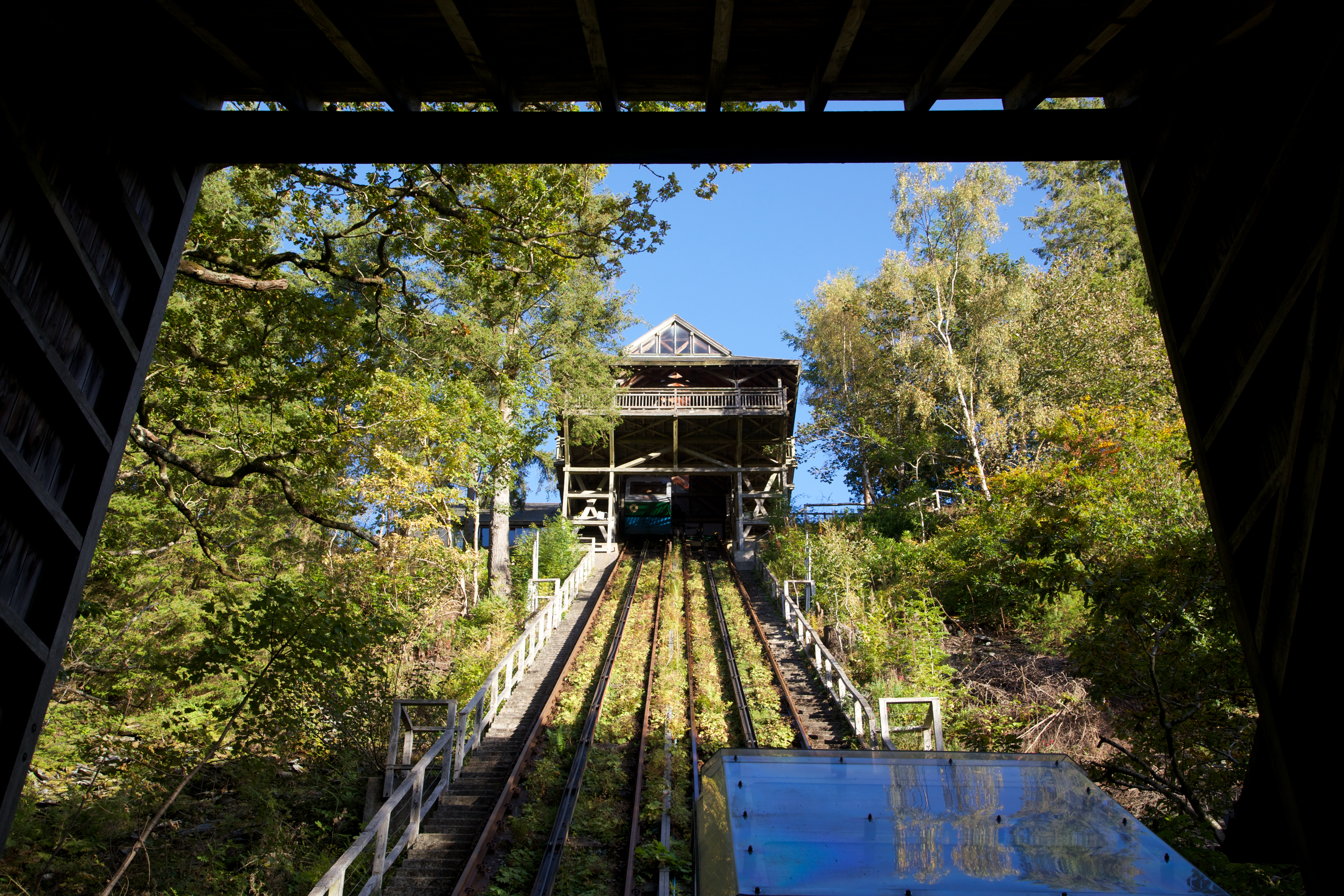
The inclined railway from the car park to the ticket office

The facilities and exhibits include:

- The water-balanced CAT funicular, the Centre for Alternative Technology Railway
- Solar, hydropower and wind power
- A low-energy house
- A site-wide electricity grid powered by renewable energy
- Displays of organic gardening methods
- A hydraulic ram pump
- Strawbale and rammed earth buildings
- Britain's largest green bookshop
- Vegetarian/vegan restaurant
- Events, activities and courses that take place throughout the year

In 2023, the CAT announced that financial pressures had forced it to stop admitting walk-up day visitors, although it would continue to hold group visits and other events and courses.

== Education ==
The centre offers a range of short courses which are between a day and a week in length. Some of these courses are offered to the general public while others are accredited courses for professionals. CAT is involved with school education through training teachers, producing materials and offering special tours and materials on site.

The centre also offers postgraduate courses through their Graduate School of the Environment and validated by either the University of East London or Liverpool John Moores University. Courses include a Master in Sustainable Architecture part II, and Masters and postgraduate courses on Sustainability and Adaptation, Sustainability in Energy Provision and Demand Management, Green Building, Sustainable Food and Natural Resources, Sustainability and Ecology, and Sustainability and Behaviour Change.

=== Wales Institute for Sustainable Education ===
In summer 2010, CAT inaugurated the Wales Institute for Sustainable Education (WISE), a large educational building designed as a case study of sustainable architecture. The building contains a lecture theatre and accommodation and demonstrates ecological building principles such as passive solar building design and heat recovery ventilation as well as low-impact building materials such as wood, hemp, lime and rammed earth. The external walls of the building are made from 500mm thick hempcrete, whereas the lecture theatre has 7.2m high walls made from 320t of rammed earth.

A building management system is used to monitor a wide variety of parameters inside the building, providing data for research projects by CAT's sustainable architecture students. The building is used for teaching postgraduate degrees and short courses and is also available as a conference venue and exhibition space.

In 2010 the WISE building was awarded the first place in The Daily Telegraph's list of Top 10 Buildings 2010 and came fourth in The Guardian's Top 10 list of buildings for 2010. It received a Royal Institute of British Architects (RIBA) Award in 2011.

== Energy ==
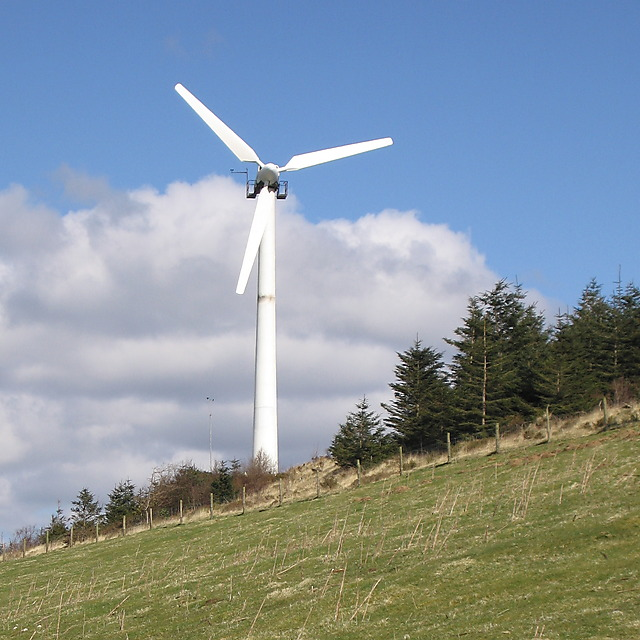
The site's wind turbine

CAT originally relied on a collection of water, wind and solar power, but following power shortages it began to receive power from the National Grid. Shortly afterwards, in 2004, a large new wind turbine was built using funds generated by selling shares in the project to the community, Bro Dyfi Community renewables. From 2009 September onwards CAT has operated a microgrid system, which includes elements of on- and off-grid operation.

CAT gets its water from an existing man-made reservoir in the slate quarry in which it is based and processes its own sewage in its reedbeds.

== Regional impact ==
The presence of the Centre in the Dyfi Valley has brought an increased environmental emphasis to the area, which is now designated as a UNESCO Biosphere Reserve. In the nearest town, Machynlleth, CAT plc formerly operated a wholefood vegetarian café and a separate shop. Following the closure of CAT plc the CAT charity retained ownership of the vegetarian cafe but subsequently sold it to its workers. The cafe is now run as a private enterprise but continues to operate as a vegetarian cafe. The wholefood shop was closed, since the building was not owned by CAT. However a new wholefood shop, Dyfi Wholefoods, was opened by the staff who were made redundant. An industrial estate (the Dyfi Eco Park) near Machynlleth railway station houses the offices of Dulas Ltd, a renewable-energy company founded by ex-CAT employees.

== See also ==
- Centre for Appropriate Rural Technology
- Diggers and Dreamers
