= Cadair Idris =

Mountain in Gwynedd, Wales

Coordinates: 52.699828°N 3.908693°W

- Cader Idris
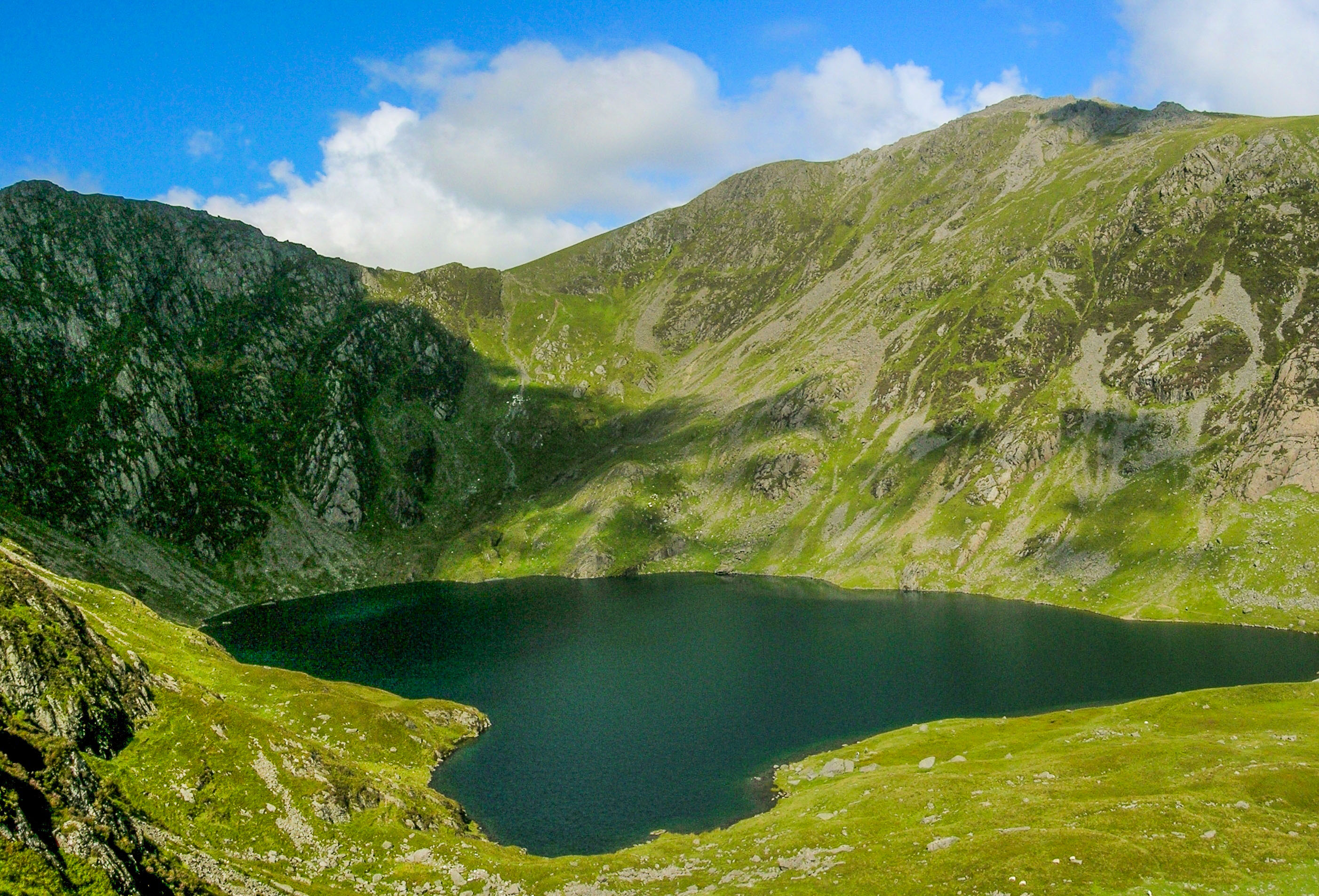
- Llyn Cau with the summit of the mountain to the right

Highest point
- Elevation: 893 m (2,930 ft)
- Prominence: 608 m (1,995 ft)
- Parent peak: Aran Fawddwy
- Isolation: 17.8 km (11.1 mi)
- Listing: Marilyn, Hewitt, Nuttall

Naming
- English translation: Chair of Idris
- Language of name: Welsh
- Pronunciation: Welsh: [ˈkadai̯r ˈɪdrɪs]

Geography
- Location: Gwynedd, Wales
- Parent range: Snowdonia
- OS grid: SH711130
- Topo map: OS Landranger 124, Explorer OL23

Climbing
- Easiest route: Hike

Cadair Idris (Welsh pronunciation) or Cader Idris is a mountain in the Meirionnydd area of Gwynedd, Wales. It lies at the southern end of the Snowdonia National Park near the town of Dolgellau. The peak, which is one of the most popular in Wales for walkers and hikers, is composed largely of Ordovician igneous rocks, with classic glacial erosion features such as cwms, moraines, striated rocks, and roches moutonnées.

== Etymology ==
Cadair Idris means 'Idris's Chair'. Idris is usually taken to be the name of a giant or, alternatively, it may refer to Idris ap Gwyddno (or Gweiddno), a 7th-century prince of Meirionnydd who won a battle against the Irish on the mountain. Idris ap Gwyddno was in fact referred to as Idris Gawr ('Idris the Giant') in some mediaeval genealogies of Meirionydd.

The basic meaning of the word cadair (Middle Welsh/Early Modern Welsh kadeir or cadeir) is 'seat, chair' (borrowed from the Greek cathedra, καθέδρα, 'chair'). In place names cadair can mean 'stronghold, fort, fortress' or 'mountain or hill shaped like a chair'. The spelling cader represents a spoken variant of the standard form cadair.

It appears that Cadair/Cadeir Idris is the form used in the earliest Welsh-language sources. In a poem in his own hand in the second half of the 15th century, the poet Lewys Glyn Cothi wrote "Dros gadair idris gedy" ('and then over Cadair Idris'). Around 1600, John Jones of Gellilyfdy referred to "y mynydh neu bhan neu bhoel a elwir Cadeir Idris" ('the mountain, peak or hill known as Cadeir Idris').

The spoken form represented by cader had developed by the end of the Middle Ages and as a result the form Cader Idris was often used in English and Latin documents at that time and in more recent documents in English and Welsh.

In his Dictionarum Duplex published in 1632, John Davies of Mallwyd differentiated between the two words cadair ('chair') and cader ('fort, fortress'), referring to Cader Idris and Cader Ddinmael. That interpretation was followed by some later lexicographers, including Thomas Charles and Titus Lewis. It is now accepted, however, that cader is a spelling of a spoken form of cadair, and that there is no evidence that cadair and cader are separate words. But as it represents the pronunciation in the local dialect, the spelling Cader Idris is often seen in Welsh and English, and in June 2016 Snowdonia National Park decided to adopt that spelling on its signage, despite advice from the Welsh Language Commissioner and from Park officers, who favoured Cadair. The local dialect form is also seen in the name of the local secondary school, Ysgol y Gader. The name of the mountain is typically spelt 'Cadair Idris on current maps. The summit of the mountain is known as Penygader ('top of the chair/stronghold').

== Ascent ==
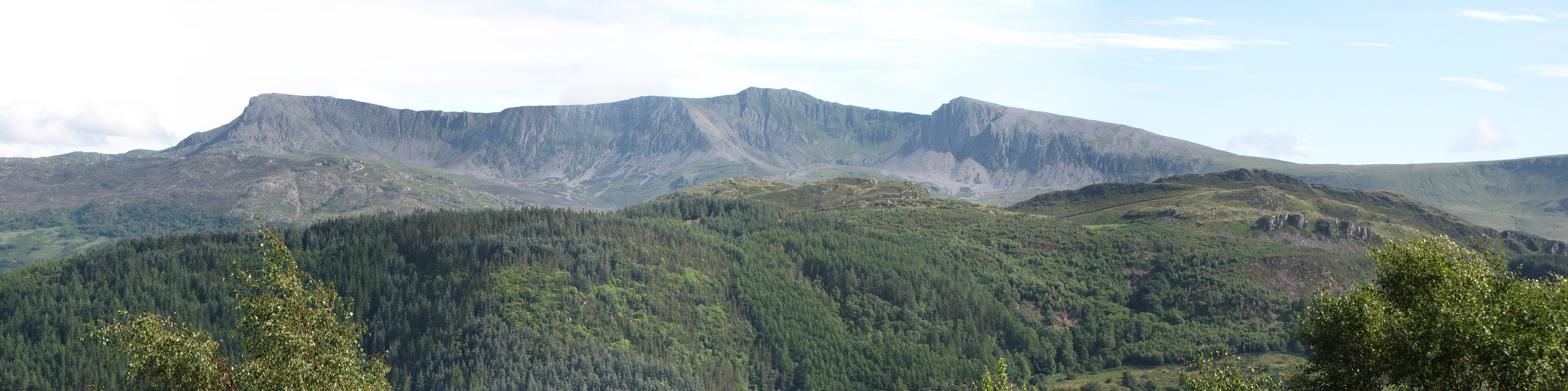
The northern side of Cadair Idris viewed from Garth Gell (Bontddu)

Listed summits of Cadair Idris
Name	Grid ref	Height	Status
Mynydd Moel	SH727136	863 m (2,831 ft)	Hewitt; Nuttall
Cyfrwy	SH703133	811 m (2,661 ft)	Hewitt; Nuttall
Craig Cwm Amarch	SH710121	791 m (2,595 ft)	Hewitt; Nuttall
Gau Graig	SH744141	683 m (2,241 ft)	Hewitt; Nuttall
Tyrrau Mawr	SH677135	661 m (2,169 ft)	Hewitt; Nuttall
Craig-y-llyn	SH677135	622 m (2,041 ft)	Hewitt; Nuttall

There are three main trails that lead to the top of Cadair Idris. The summit, which is covered in scree, is marked by a trig point. There is also a low-standing stone shelter with a roof.

=== Pony Path ===
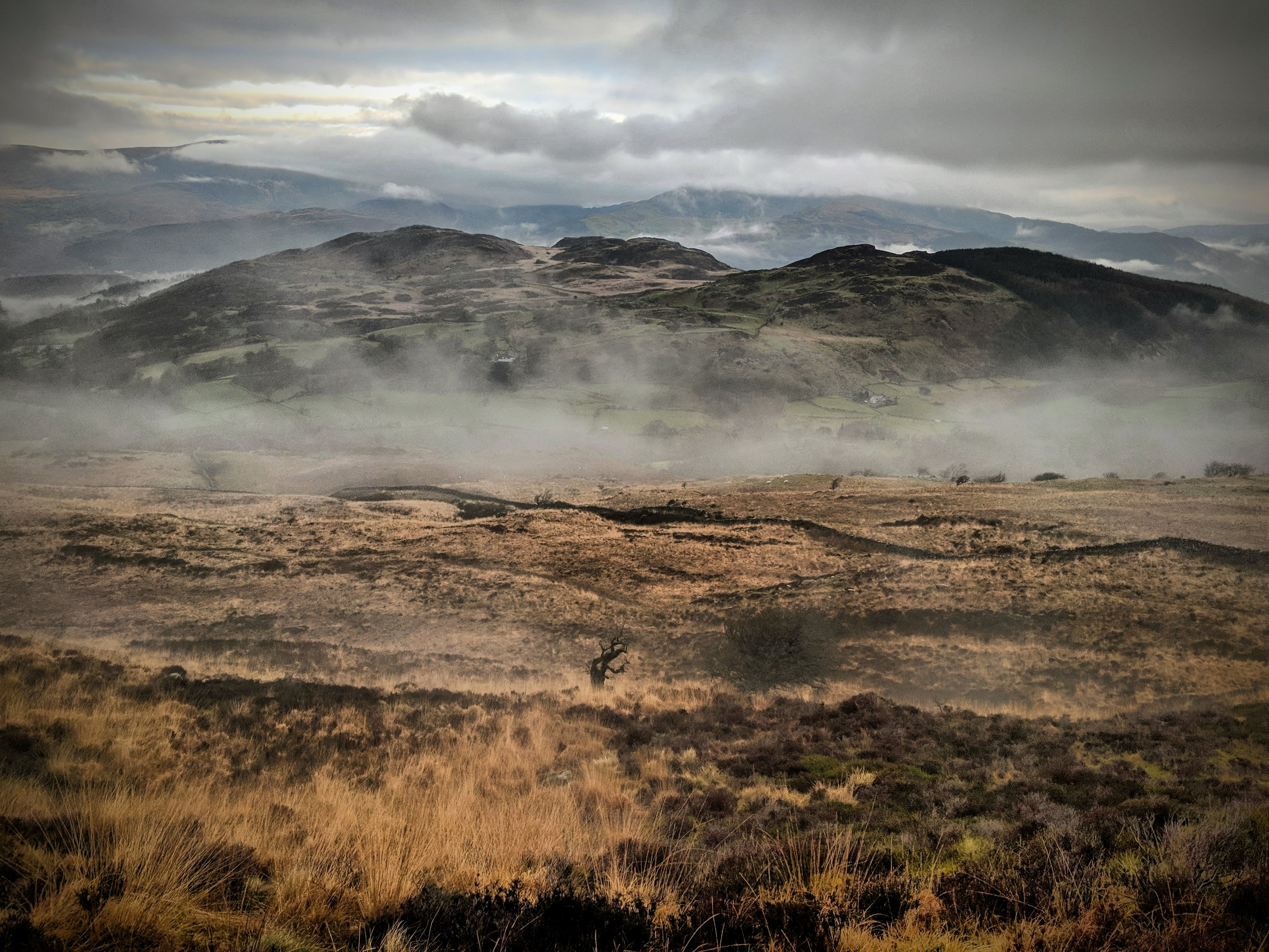
Looking north from Llwybr Pilin Pwn

The Pony Path (Welsh: Llwybr Pilin Pwn), which begins in the north from either Dolgellau or the Mawddach estuary, is the easiest but the longest of the main trails. Its length from the mountain's base is 6 kilometres (3.7 mi) with a 727-metre (2,385 ft) climb.

=== Fox's Path ===
The Fox's Path (Welsh: Llwybr Madyn), is the most direct way to the summit as the trail leads straight up the northern face. The 3.8-kilometre (2.4 mi) ascent involves a climb up a 310-metre (1,020 ft) cliff-scree face. However, this part of the Fox's Path has been heavily eroded in recent years making the descent dangerous.

=== Minffordd Path ===
The Minffordd Path (Welsh: Llwybr Minffordd) starts on the southern side of the mountain near the glacial Tal-y-llyn Lake. Hikers using this ascent climb past Llyn Cau and along the rim of Craig Cau (rockwall) to Penygadair. Its length is 4.4 kilometres (2.7 mi) and involves two climbs of over 300 metres (980 ft).

== Geology ==
Cadair Idris is formed from a complexly fractured and folded pile of both sedimentary rocks and igneous rocks of Ordovician age. They comprise the mudstones and siltstones of the Ceiswyn Formation which form much of the southern part of the mountain, together with the varied rocks of the underlying Aran Volcanic Group. The steep cliffs rising above Llyn Cau to the north are formed from hard-wearing basalts and tuffs of the Pen y Gadair Volcanic Formation whilst those on the south side are acid tuffs of the Craig Cau Formation. The imposing cliffs which characterise the north side of the mountain are formed from a microgranite intruded into the Ty'r Gawen mudstones. In common with the rest of Snowdonia, the faulting and folding of this rock succession took place during the Caledonian Orogeny.

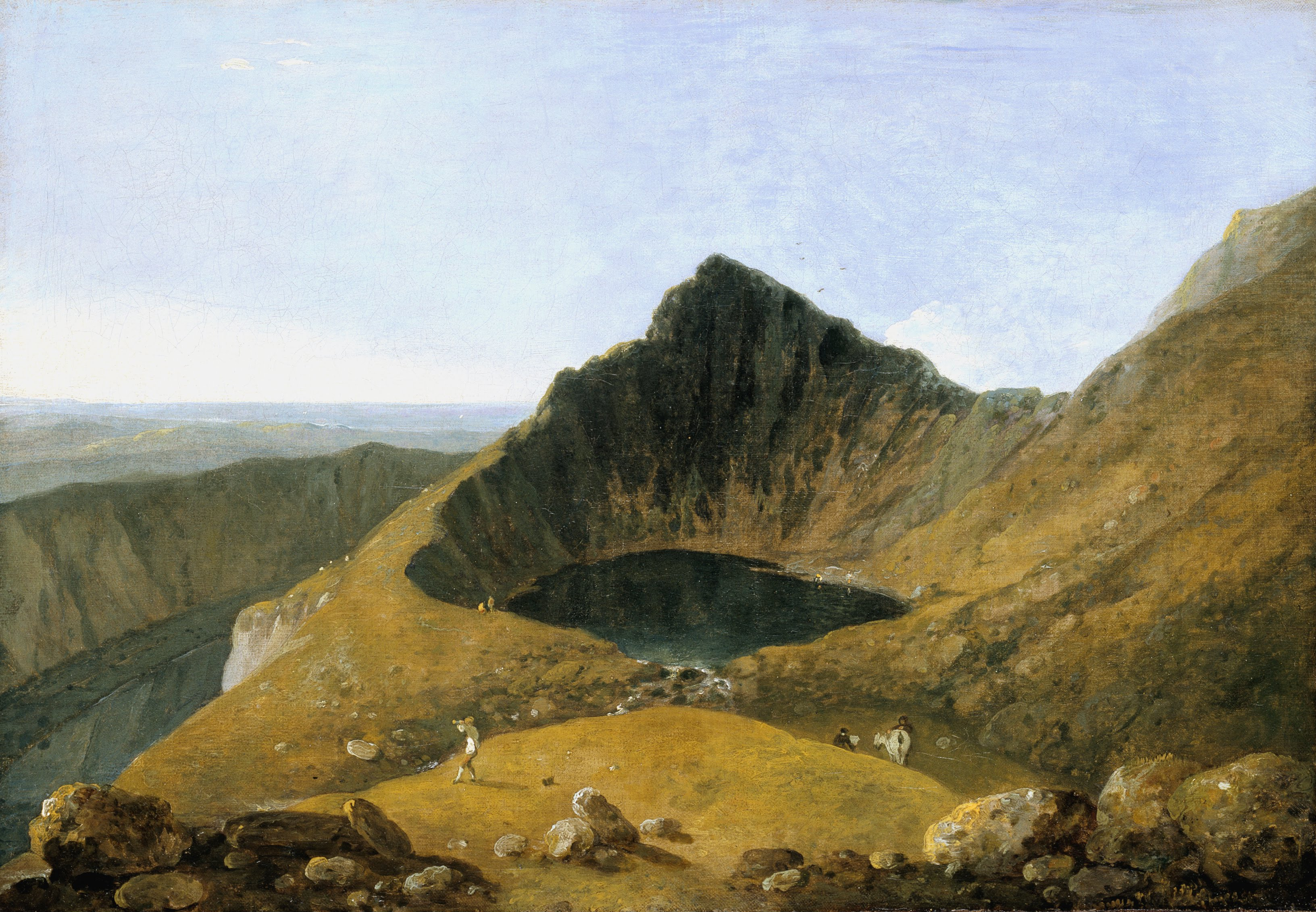
Llyn-y-Cau, Cader Idris by Richard Wilson, 1774

The crater-like shape of Cwm Cau has given rise to the occasional mistaken claim that Cadair Idris is an extinct volcano (though as noted above, some of its bedrock is volcanic in origin). This theory was discounted as early as 1872, when Charles Kingsley commented in his book Town Geology:

I have been told, for instance, that that wonderful little blue Glas Llyn, under the highest cliff of Snowdon, is the old crater of the mountain; and I have heard people insist that a similar lake, of almost equal grandeur, in the south side of Cader Idris, is a crater likewise. But the fact is not so.

The natural bowl-shaped depression to which the name of chair has been attached, was formed by a cirque glacier during multiple ice ages when snow and ice accumulated on these slopes partly through avalanching. The glacier was up to a square kilometre in size surrounded on three sides by steep cliffs the highest being the headwall. The chair of Cadair Idris is this bowl-shaped hollow in the bedrock formed by the movement of glacial ice across the floor of the hollow, abrading it and the lip over which it then flowed.

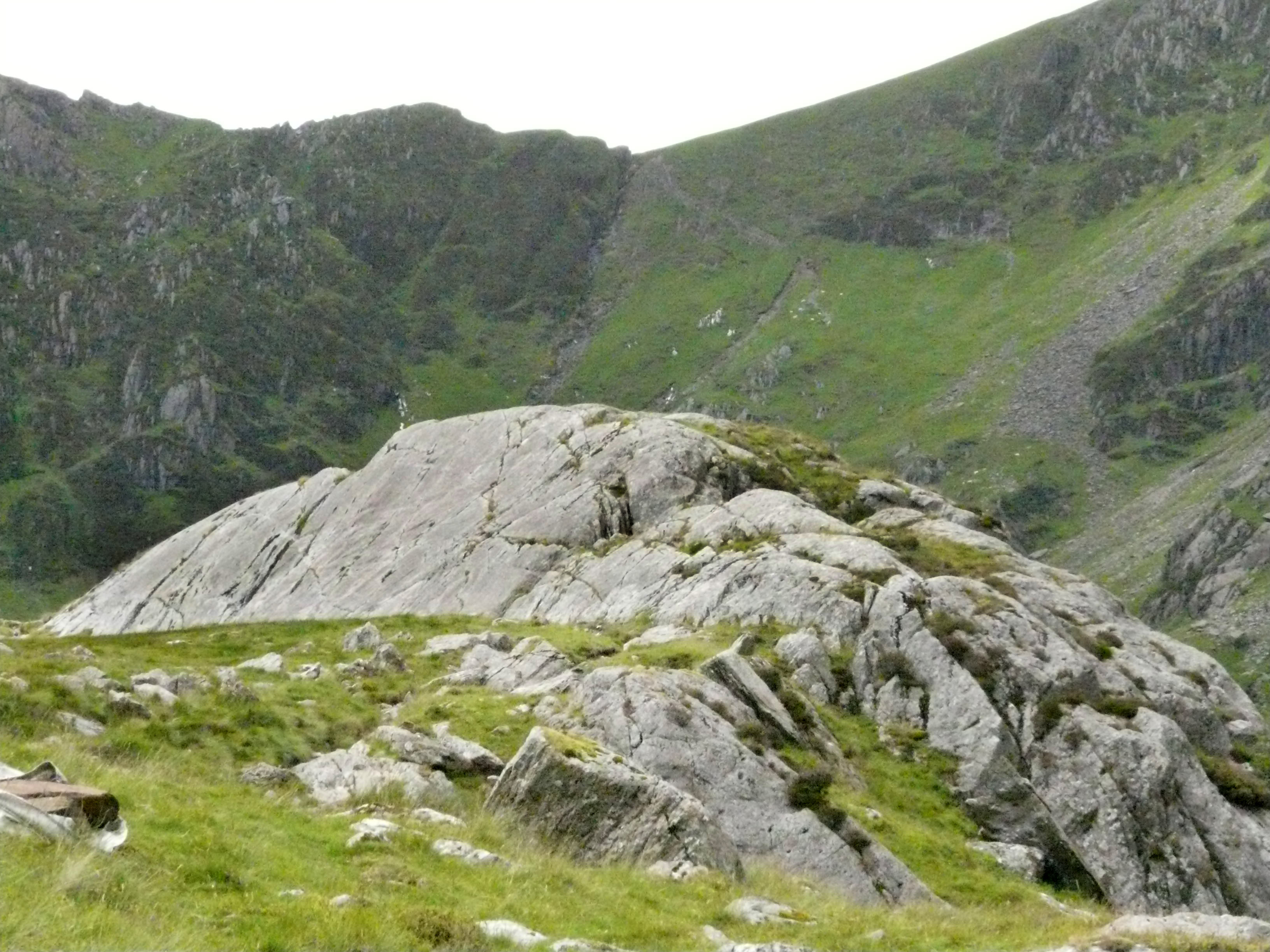
A roche moutonnée near Llyn Cau. The direction of the glacial movement was from left to right.

There are several tear-drop shaped knolls above the edge of Llyn Cau, each of which is a roche moutonnée formed by the abrasive action of the moving ice. The two highest lakes are Llyn Cau and Llyn y Gader; the latter is thought to have a maximum depth of about 13 m (43 ft).

Much of the area around Cadair Idris was designated a National Nature Reserve in 1957, and is home to Arctic–alpine plants such as purple saxifrage and dwarf willow.

== Myths, legends and popular culture ==
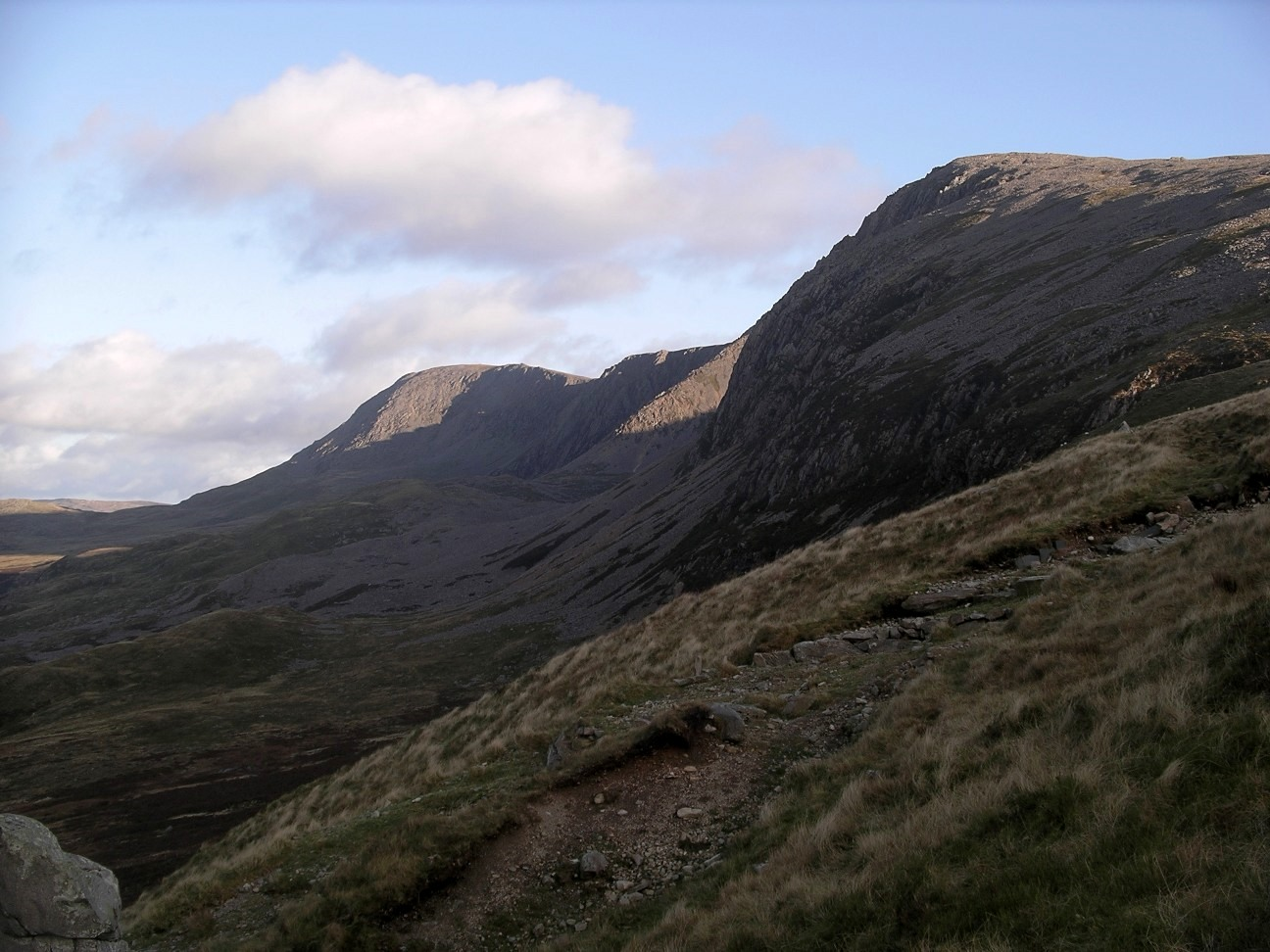
Looking at Penygadair (right) from the Pony Path in January 2005. The steep scree route of the Fox's Path is highlighted in sunlight (centre).

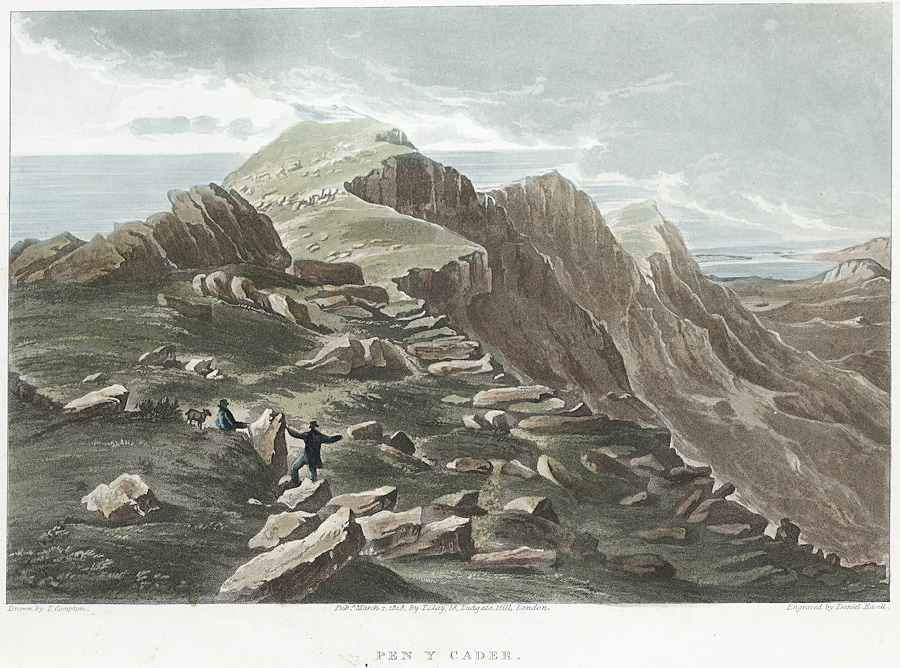
Cadair Idris in 1818

There are numerous legends about Cadair Idris. Some nearby lakes are supposed to be bottomless, and anyone who sleeps on its slopes alone will supposedly awaken either a madman or a poet. This tradition (of sleeping on the summit of the mountain) apparently stems from bardic traditions, where bards would sleep on the mountain in hope of inspiration.

Although the mountain's name is typically taken to refer to the mythological giant Idris, who was said to have been skilled in poetry, astronomy and philosophy, it has sometimes been mistranslated as Arthur's Seat, in reference to King Arthur (and to the hill of the same name in Edinburgh), an idea used by author Susan Cooper in her book The Grey King. However, this translation is mistaken and there is no etymological or traditional connection between Idris and Arthur.

In Welsh mythology, Cadair Idris is also said to be one of the hunting grounds of Gwyn ap Nudd and his Cŵn Annwn. The howling of these huge dogs foretold death to anyone who heard them, the pack sweeping up that person's soul and herding it into the underworld. Similarly the Brenin Llwyd is also said to haunt a number of locations including Cadair Idris.

The mountain is mentioned several times and is used as a backdrop to the story of Mary Jones and her Bible. This story is an account of a girl from Llanfihangel-y-Pennant at the foot of the mountain who walked 25 miles to Bala in order to buy a bible, which were scarce at the time. Jones' determined journey to get hold of a copy of the book in 1800 was a major factor behind the foundation of the British and Foreign Bible Society in 1804.

"Tongues of fire on Idris flaring" is mentioned in the opening verse of the John Guard version of the song "Men of Harlech".

In Cassandra Clare's Clockwork Princess Idris is where final battle between the protagonists and antagonist takes place.
