= Tyrrau Mawr =

Coordinates: 52.699428°N 3.907032°W

Tyrrau Mawr\Craig-las
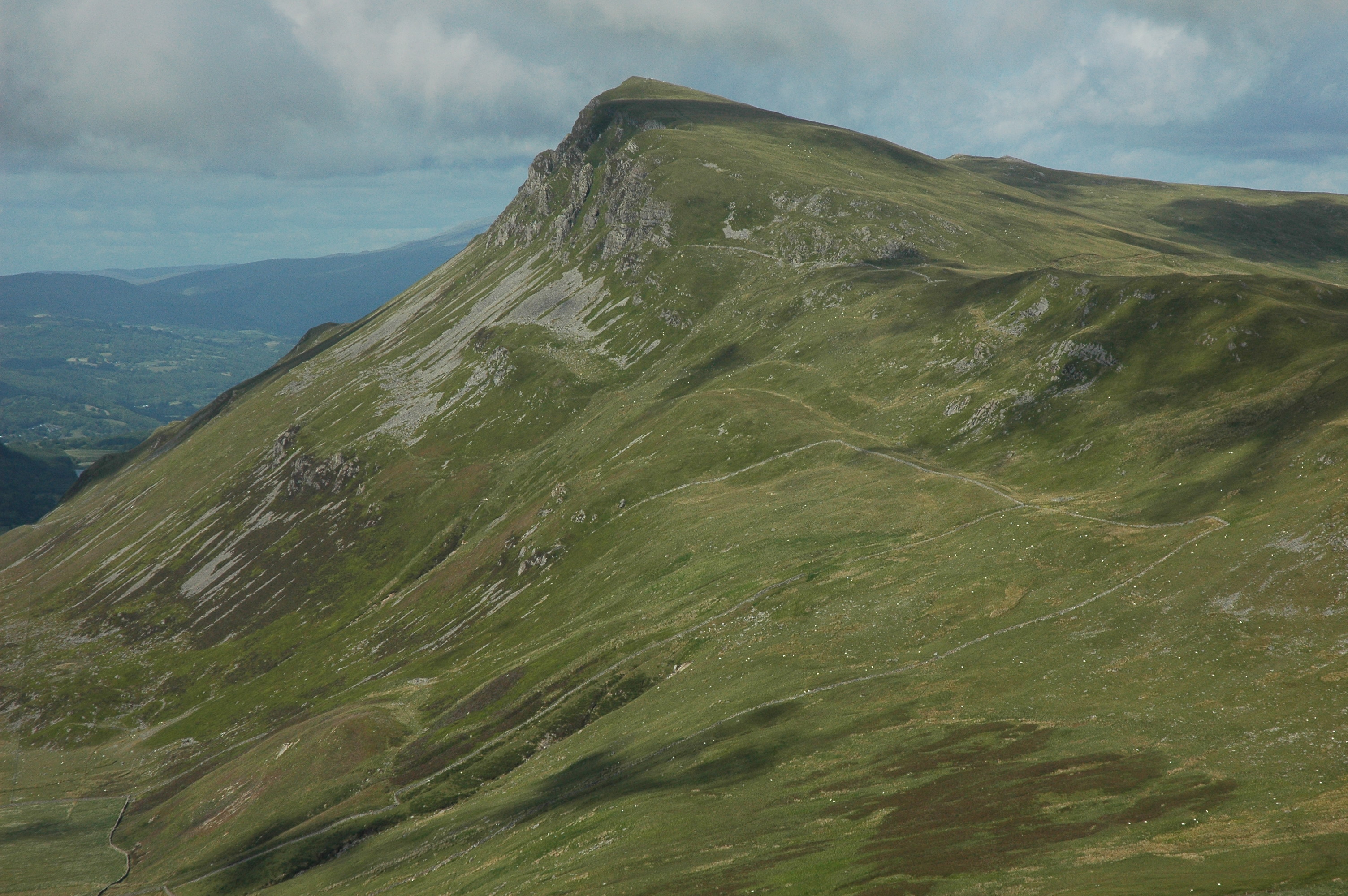
- Tyrrau Mawr from the west

Highest point
- Elevation: 661 m (2,169 ft)
- Prominence: 103 m (338 ft)
- Parent peak: Cadair Idris
- Listing: Hewitt, Nuttall, HuMP

Naming
- Language of name: Welsh

Geography
- Location: Gwynedd, Wales
- Parent range: Cadair Idris
- OS grid: SH711130
- Topo map: OS Landranger 124, Explorer OL23

Climbing
- Easiest route: Hike

Tyrrau Mawr or Craig-las is a subsidiary summit of Cadair Idris in the Snowdonia National Park, in Gwynedd, northwest Wales. It lies to the west of Cyfrwy, and can be climbed by taking a west bearing from the Pony Path at Rhiw Gwredydd. Its north face is a crag, known as Craig-las. Below the crags lies Llyn Cregennen with its small island. The reflection of Craig-las from this lake is one of the famous images associated with Snowdonia.

The summit is grassy and marked by a few stones. To the east of the summit lies the large ancient cairn, Carnedd Lwyd. It is often climbed in combination with Craig-y-llyn.
