= Craig-y-llyn =

Hill in Snowdonia, Wales

Coordinates: 52.699428°N 3.907032°W

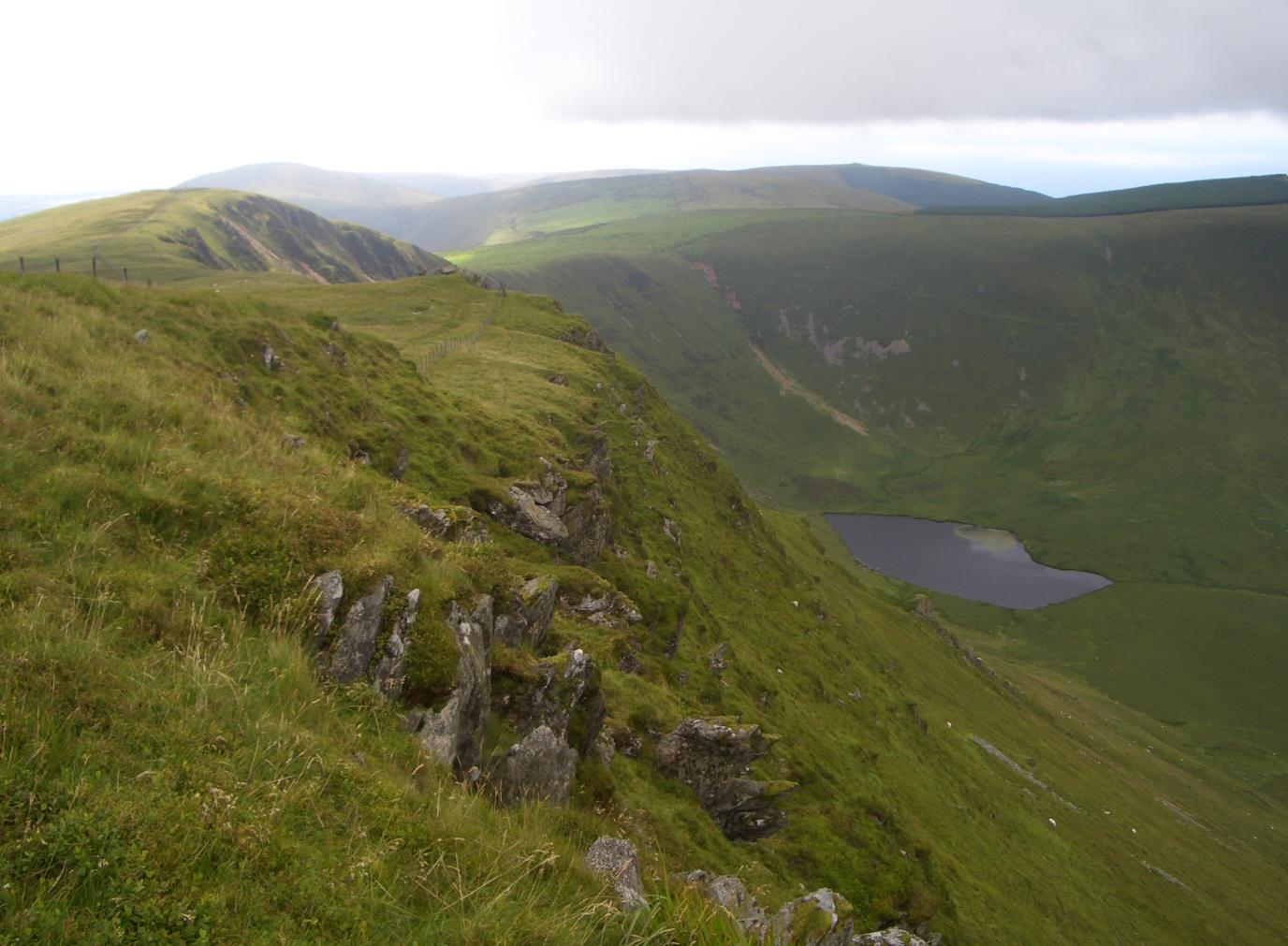
- Llyn Cyri from the summit of Craig-y-llyn

Highest point
- Elevation: 622 m (2,041 ft)
- Prominence: 136 m (446 ft)
- Parent peak: Cadair Idris
- Listing: Hewitt, Nuttall, HuMP

Naming
- English translation: the lake's crag
- Language of name: Welsh

Geography
- Location: Gwynedd, Wales
- Parent range: Cadair Idris
- OS grid: SH711130
- Topo map: OS Landranger 124, Explorer OL23

Climbing
- Easiest route: Hike

Craig-y-llyn is a subsidiary summit of Cadair Idris in the Snowdonia National Park, in Gwynedd, northwest Wales. It lies at the western end of the long Cadair Idris ridge. Its north-facing cwm houses the small glacial lake, Llyn Cyri. The southern flanks have gentle slopes, while the northern are very steep and contain broken crags.

The summit is grassy and marked by a few stones. It is often climbed in combination with Tyrrau Mawr.
