= Craig Cwm Amarch =

Mountain (791.9m) in Gwynedd, Wales

Coordinates: 52.6893°N 3.9130°W

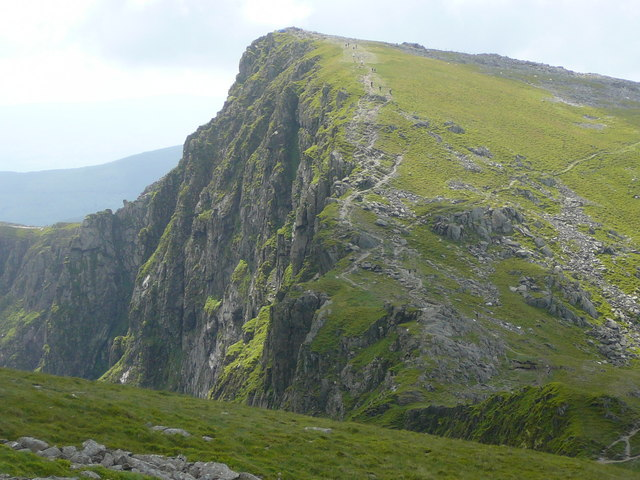
- The northern spur from Craig Cwm Amarch, Cader Idris

Highest point
- Elevation: 792 m (2,598 ft)
- Prominence: 79 m (259 ft)
- Parent peak: Cader Idris
- Listing: Hewitt, Nuttall

Naming
- English translation: Cwm Amarch crag
- Language of name: Welsh

Geography
- Location: Gwynedd, Wales
- Parent range: Cader Idris
- OS grid: SH708119
- Topo map: OS Landranger 124, Explorer OL23

Climbing
- Easiest route: Hike

Craig Cwm Amarch is a mountain in Gwynedd, Wales. It is at the head of Cwm Amarch on Cader Idris in the Snowdonia National Park. It has an elevation of 791.9 m (2,598 ft) and a prominence of 79.2 m (260 ft), and is classed as a Simm, a Hewitt and a Nuttall.
