= Llanwrin =

Village in Wales

Coordinates: 52.6157°N 3.7925°W

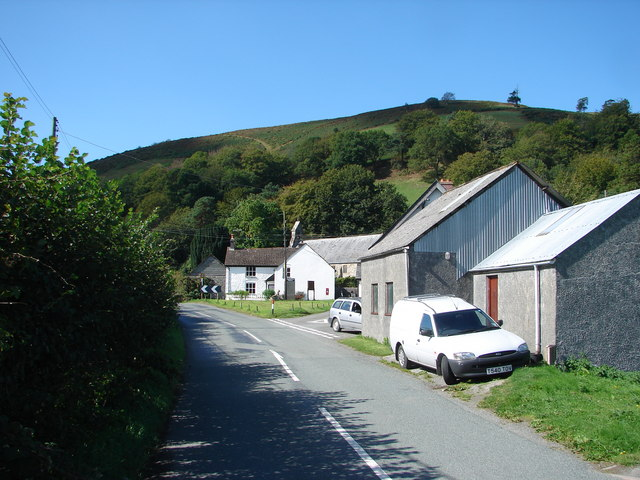
- Llanwrin in 2006

- Location within Powys
- OS grid reference: SH787034
- Principal area: Powys
- Preserved county: Powys
- Country: Wales
- Sovereign state: United Kingdom
- Post town: MACHYNLLETH
- Postcode district: SY20
- Dialling code: 01650
- Police: Dyfed-Powys
- Fire: Mid and West Wales
- Ambulance: Welsh
- UK Parliament: Montgomeryshire and Glyndŵr
- Senedd Cymru – Welsh Parliament: Montgomeryshire

Llanwrin is a small village in the valley of the Afon Dyfi in Powys, Wales, about two miles north-east of Machynlleth. Until 1987 Llanwrin was a community; today it is in the community of Glantwymyn.

== History and background ==
Historically, it was in the county of Montgomeryshire (Welsh: Sir Drefaldwyn).

The village is named after its church, dedicated to St. Gwrin, which dates from late medieval times and was last restored in 1864. The nearby historically significant house of Mathafarn dates back to at least 1485.

Once a community with its own blacksmith, pub and village shop – all long since closed – in recent years the village has been a collection of houses stretched along the B4404 road.

== Straw man ==
Llanwrin is known locally for its various straw man characters, which are located from time to time on the small triangle-shaped village green.

The Strawman

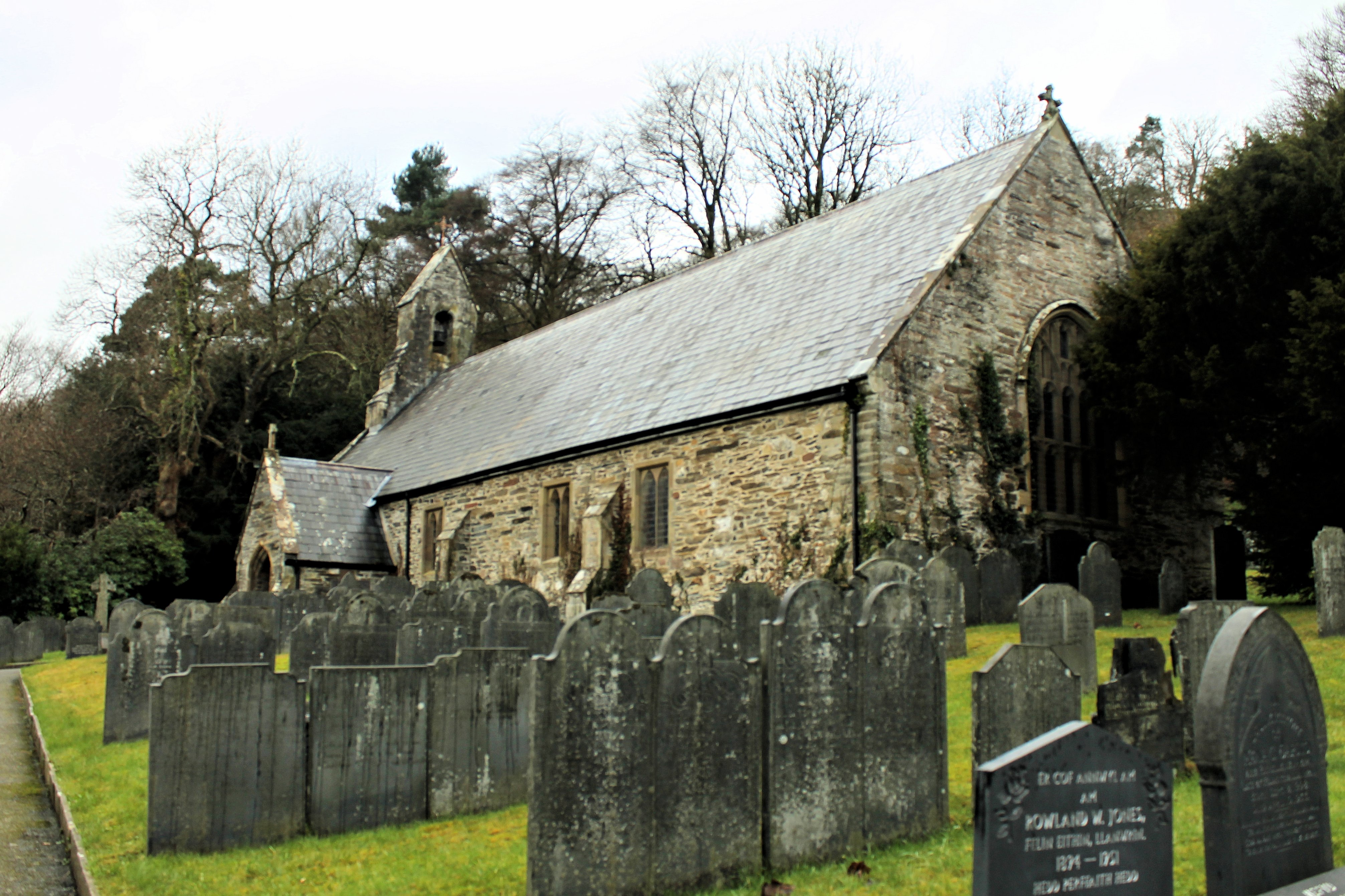
Church of St Ust and St Dyfrig
