= Celtica =

Celtica may refer to:

- Gallia Celtica, region of ancient Gaul inhabited by Celts
- Celtica (plant), genus of grasses in the tribe Stipeae
- Celtica (journal), academic journal devoted to Celtic studies
- Celtica (visitor centre), heritage attraction at Machynlleth, Powys, Wales, from 1995 to 2006
- Celtica Radio, radio station based in Bridgend, Wales
- Salsa Celtica, group that plays salsa music with traditional Scottish instruments
- Studia Celtica, scholarly linguistics journal based in Wales

== See also ==
- Celtic (disambiguation)
