= Mathafarn =

Coordinates: 52.6249°N 3.7633°W

Mathafarn is a house and farm near Llanwrin, in Wales. The earliest house here was built before 1485, and Mathafarn plays a significant role in Welsh and English history.

== History ==
The earliest reference to Mathafarn is in 1485. Henry Tudor was travelling through Wales to meet Richard III at the Battle of Bosworth Field, when he stopped at Mathafarn Hall, near Machynlleth and consulted with the poet Dafydd Llwyd (c1420 to c1500) who lived at the hall. Llwyd was made an esquire following Henry's decisive victory at the Battle of Bosworth.

Around 1600, the house was owned by Richard ap John ap Hugh, a descendant of Llwyd. Hugh's son Rowland Pugh was the Lord of Meirionedd, and in 1624, was elected as the MP for Cardigan. In 1625, he was re-elected to the seat, and appointed as High Sheriff of Montgomeryshire. In 1628 he built a new house at Mathafarn. Pugh supported the Royalist side in the English Civil War. On 2 November 1644, Sir Thomas Myddleton of the Parliamentarian army was marching through the Dyfi valley when he was ambushed by a force organised by Pugh. In retaliation for the attack, Myddleton burned down Mathafarn on 29 November 1644. Rowland Pugh died at Christmas 1644; his son John Pugh was made Lord of Cyfeiliog at the Restoration in recognition of his father's support of the Monarchy.

Another house was built at Mathafarn towards the end of the 17th century and was sold to Sir Watkin Williams-Wynn in 1752. Wynn's son Sir Watkin Williams-Wynn, 5th Baronet built a new house at Mathafarn around 1800.

By 1859, Williams-Wynn had moved out of Mathafarn and had leased the house to William Owen. In 1915, Edward Hughes, a county alderman and magistrate of Montgomeryshire was in possession of Mathafarn. The house built in 1800 still stands in 2017.

== Location ==
Mathafarn is located half a mile north-west of Cemmaes Road and a similar distance east of Llanwrin. It stands at the confluence of the Afon Ceirig and the Afon Dyfi.
