= River Dyfi =

River in Mid Wales

Coordinates: 52.6004°N 3.8567°W

River Dyfi River Dovey
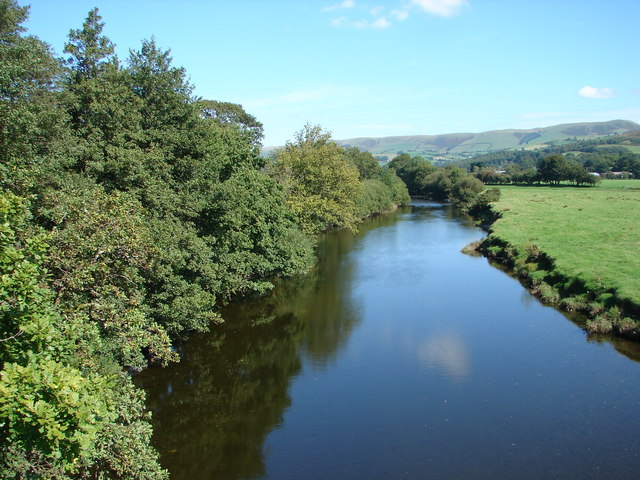
- The river viewed upstream from the Jubilee Bridge near Mathafarn
- Native name: Afon Dyfi (Welsh)

Location
- Country: Wales

Physical characteristics
- Source: Creiglyn Dyfi
  - elevation: 1,900 ft (580 m)
- Mouth
  - location: Irish Sea
- Length: 30 mi (48 km)

The River Dyfi (Welsh: Afon Dyfi; Welsh pronunciation: [ˈdəvi]), also known as the River Dovey (/ˈdʌvi/ DUV-ee), is an approximately 30-mile (48-kilometre) long river in Wales.

Its large estuary forms the boundary between the counties of Gwynedd and Ceredigion, and its lower reaches have historically been considered the border between North Wales and South Wales.

== Name ==
The Welsh spelling Dyfi is widely used locally and by the Welsh Government, Natural Resources Wales and the BBC. The anglicised spelling Dovey continues to be used by some entities.

== Sources ==
The River Dyfi rises in the small lake Creiglyn Dyfi at about 1,900 feet (580 m) above sea level, below Aran Fawddwy, flowing south to Dinas Mawddwy and Cemmaes Road (Welsh: Glantwymyn), then south west past Machynlleth to Cardigan Bay (Welsh: Bae Ceredigion) at Aberdyfi. It shares its watershed with the River Severn (Welsh: Afon Hafren) and the River Dee (Welsh: Afon Dyfrdwy) before flowing generally south-westwards down to a wide estuary. The only large town on its route is Machynlleth.

A short video by Natural Resources Wales on environmental, social and economic considerations of the Dyfi catchment area

The river is prone to flooding and some roads in the lower catchment can become impassable during very wet weather. It has been a relatively pristine river with few polluting inputs. The catchment area is notable for its now-defunct lead mines and slate quarries, especially around Corris and Dinas Mawddwy, and is notable for its salmon and sea trout (migratory brown trout).

== Tributaries ==
The main tributaries of the River Dyfi are:

- Afon Leri at Ynyslas
- Afon Clettwr north of Tre'r Ddol
- Nant y Gog at Eglwys Fach
- Afon Einion downstream of Glandyfi
- Afon Llyfnant upstream of Glandyfi
- North Dulas at Ffridd Gate
- South Dulas east of Machynlleth
- Afon Ceirig at Mathafarn
- Afon Twymyn upstream of Cemmaes Road (Glantwymyn)
- Afon Angell at Aberangell
- Afon Cleifion at Mallwyd
- Afon Cerist at Dinas Mawddwy
- Afon Cywarch at Aber-Cywarch

== Notable bridges ==
- Pont Minllyn
- Dyfi Bridge (Welsh: Pont ar Ddyfi)

== Dyfi Biosphere ==
The area around Aberystwyth and the Dyfi Valley is known as the Dyfi Biosphere (Welsh: Biosffer Dyfi). It was UNESCO-designated in 1978. Within the biosphere are a number of Special Areas of Conservation and Sites of Special Scientific Interest (Cors Fochno, Coed Cwm Einion and Pen Llŷn a’r Sarnau).

In March 2021, Natural Resources Wales (NRW) granted Montgomeryshire Wildlife Trust a licence to release a family of beavers into an enclosure within the Dyfi Wildlife Centre (Cors Dyfi), the first officially licensed release of beavers in Wales.

Beavers have not yet been released under licence into the wild into the Dyfi catchment, but a licence application is being developed by the Welsh Beaver Project (North Wales Wildlife Trust/Wildlife Trusts Wales) for submission to Natural Resources Wales.

There is a small population of beavers already living wild within the Dyfi catchment whose origins are unclear.

The estuary is known for its saltmarshes.

== In literature ==
The River Dyfi features in a well-known poem by the 14th-century poet Dafydd ap Gwilym, Y Don ar Afon Dyfi (The Wave on the River Dyfi), in which, travelling back home from a journey to North Wales, he finds the River Dyfi in spate, preventing him from crossing over to meet his girlfriend Morfudd.

Another poet who wrote a poem to the river is the 15th-century Dafydd Llwyd ap Llywelyn who was born at Mathafarn on the banks of the river. In his article in the Dictionary of Welsh Biography, David Myrddin Lloyd writes "his poem to the river Dovey is a work of great beauty".

== In popular culture ==
The Dyfi estuary was used as a location shot in Led Zeppelin's 1976 film The Song Remains the Same. The segment of the film is where Robert Plant comes ashore on a boat, after which he rides a horse, making his way to Raglan Castle. The band's Bron-Yr-Aur cottage is located on the edge of Machynlleth.

In 2022 Jim Perrin published an essay on the River Dyfi in “Rivers of Wales” (Gwasg Garreg Gwalch).

== See also ==
- Dyfi National Nature Reserve
- Dyfi Valley Way
