= Dyfi Valley Way =

108-mile footpath in mid Wales

- Length: 174 km (108 mi)
- Location: Wales
- Designation: UK National Trail
- Trailheads: River Dyfi (Dovey), Wales; Borth, Wales
- Use: Hiking

The Dyfi Valley Way is a long distance footpath in Mid Wales.

== Route ==
The 108 miles (174 km) route runs all the way up one side of the River Dyfi (Welsh: Afon Dyfi) and down the other side. The starting and finishing points, near the river's estuary, are Borth and Aberdyfi. The route follows the north side of the Dyfi through Pennal and the Centre for Alternative Technology at Llwyngwern quarry. Across the site of King Arthur's last battle at Camlan, the Way takes in the strenuous climb up to the summit of Aran Fawddwy, which at 2,971 ft (906 metres) is the highest peak south of Snowdon and the 16th highest summit in Wales. At Llanuwchllyn the route retraces its steps south of the Dovey through Llanymawddwy and Machynlleth.

The walk links with the Meirionnydd Coast Walk at Aberdyfi and with the Ceredigion Coast Path at Borth.

The route is partly waymarked, and is highly varied in character; it leads the walker along seldom walked routes. A good map is required and, if possible, a route guide (which is available from the local Tourist Information Centres).

The Dyfi valley (Welsh: Dyffryn Dyfi) is in Mid Wales and the river's lower reaches are sometimes regarded as the boundary between north and south Wales.

== Nearby footpaths ==
- Ceredigion Coast Path (which is part of the Wales Coast Path)
- Glyndŵr's Way
- Meirionnydd Coast Walk (also part of the Wales Coast path)
