= Plas Machynlleth =

Country house in Machynlleth, Powys, Wales

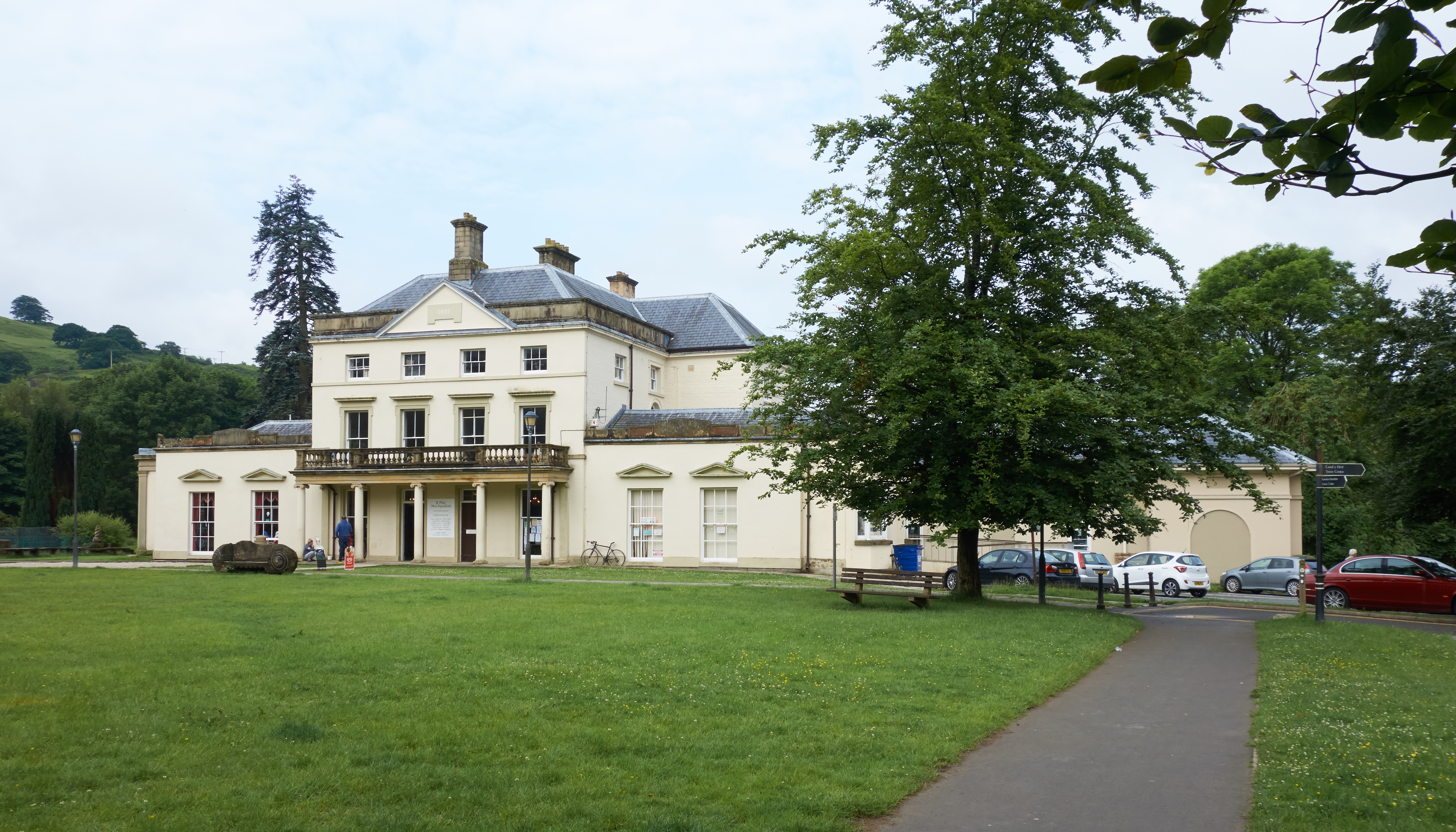
- Plas Machynlleth in 2016 (eastern aspect)
- Location within Machynlleth

General information
- Architectural style: Regency, "Gothick"
- Location: Machynlleth, Wales
- Coordinates: 52.58827°N 3.85287°W SH 745004
- Years built: c. 1750s – c. 1765, c. 1841–1900
- Owner: Machynlleth Town Council

Plas Machynlleth, (Note: Welsh pronunciation: [plaːs maˈχənɬɛθ]) known locally as Y Plas, (Note: Welsh pronunciation: [ə plaːs]) is a mansion situated in the market town of Machynlleth in Powys, Wales. It is the former Welsh residence of the Marquesses of Londonderry. It was brought into the Londonderry family following the 1846 marriage of the then Viscount Seaham (who later became, in March 1854, Earl Vane, and in November 1872, the 5th Marquess of Londonderry) to Mary Cornelia Edwards, who inherited it on the death of her father, Sir John Edwards, in 1850. Sir John had extended and renamed the house. It is a Grade II* listed building and its gardens, now mainly a public park, are listed on the Cadw/ICOMOS Register of Parks and Gardens of Special Historic Interest in Wales.

== History ==
Plas Machynlleth is known to have existed since the seventeenth century. The house was called 'Greenfields' for many years, but was renamed after the town by 1888.

The property was bought by John Edwards, a local solicitor, in the 1750s. By 1765, a three-storey double-pile (Note: 'Double-pile' means a house that is two rooms deep.) house had been built on the property; this now forms the core of the building. Edwards died in 1789; his son, Sir John Edwards, 1st Baronet, retired from politics in 1841 and undertook extensive improvements and remodelling of the house, including the addition of several wings, a new façade and a portico. On his death in 1850, Sir John Edwards' estate passed to his daughter, Mary Cornelia Edwards. She had married George Vane-Tempest, 5th Marquess of Londonderry, in 1846; as a result, the house became the main residence of the 5th Marquess until his death in 1884. His eldest son Charles left Machynlleth on succeeding to the Marquessate, and the house was then lived in by Charles' youngest brother, Lord Herbert Vane-Tempest.

After Lord Herbert was killed in the Abermule train collision on 26 January 1921, no family members remained at the house; many of the Londonderry family's landholdings were sold in 1931, and Plas Machynlleth was closed throughout the 1930s. During the Second World War, the house was used as a girls' school. In 1948, Charles Vane-Tempest-Stewart, 7th Marquess of Londonderry, a prominent Ulster Unionist politician, gave the mansion and its estate to the town. The building was adapted for use as council offices, while the 40-acre (16-hectare) grounds were designated as a public park.

In 1995, after a £3 million refurbishment funded by Montgomeryshire District Council and the European Union, the building became the 'Celtica' heritage centre. It also had space to host conferences. For several years the centre was successful in attracting tourist and educational visits and conferences. The mansion was taken over by the new unitary authority, Powys County Council, in 1996. With little investment by the council and with declining visitor numbers, the council decided to close the centre in 2006. It cited a loss of £1.1 million between 1998 and its closure. The Plas is now used as a community and meetings venue. The gardens are listed at Grade II on the Cadw/ICOMOS Register of Parks and Gardens of Special Historic Interest in Wales.

== See also ==
Other residences of the Marquesses of Londonderry:

- Londonderry House in London
- Mount Stewart in County Down
- Seaham Hall in County Durham
- Wynyard Park in County Durham
- Woollet Hall in Kent
- Garron Tower in County Antrim
