= Afon Ceirig =

River in Mid Wales

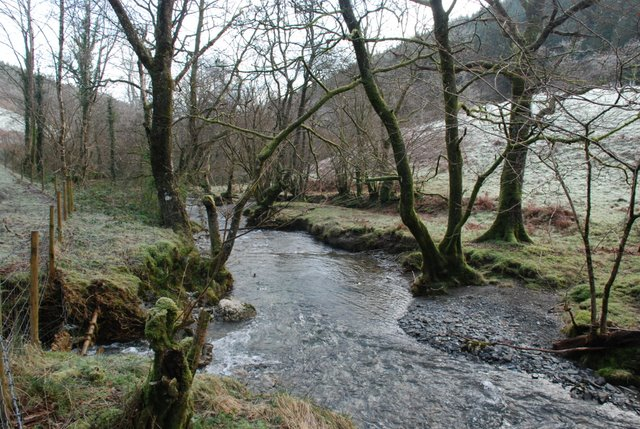
- The Afon Ceirig at the confluence with the Nant-yr-Nele

Location
- Country: Wales

Physical characteristics
- Source: Esgair Llewelyn
  - elevation: 600 ft (180 m)
- Mouth
  - location: Mathafarn
  - coordinates: 52°37′20″N 3°45′47″W
  - elevation: 80 ft (24 m)

The Afon Ceirig is a small river in Mid Wales. It flows from Esgair Llewelyn in the middle of the Dyfi Hills down to Mathafarn, north-west of Cemmaes Road, where it joins the Afon Dyfi. Between 1763 and around 1840 a water corn mill stood on the river at Bryn Melin, north of Mathafarn.
