= Pont Minllyn =

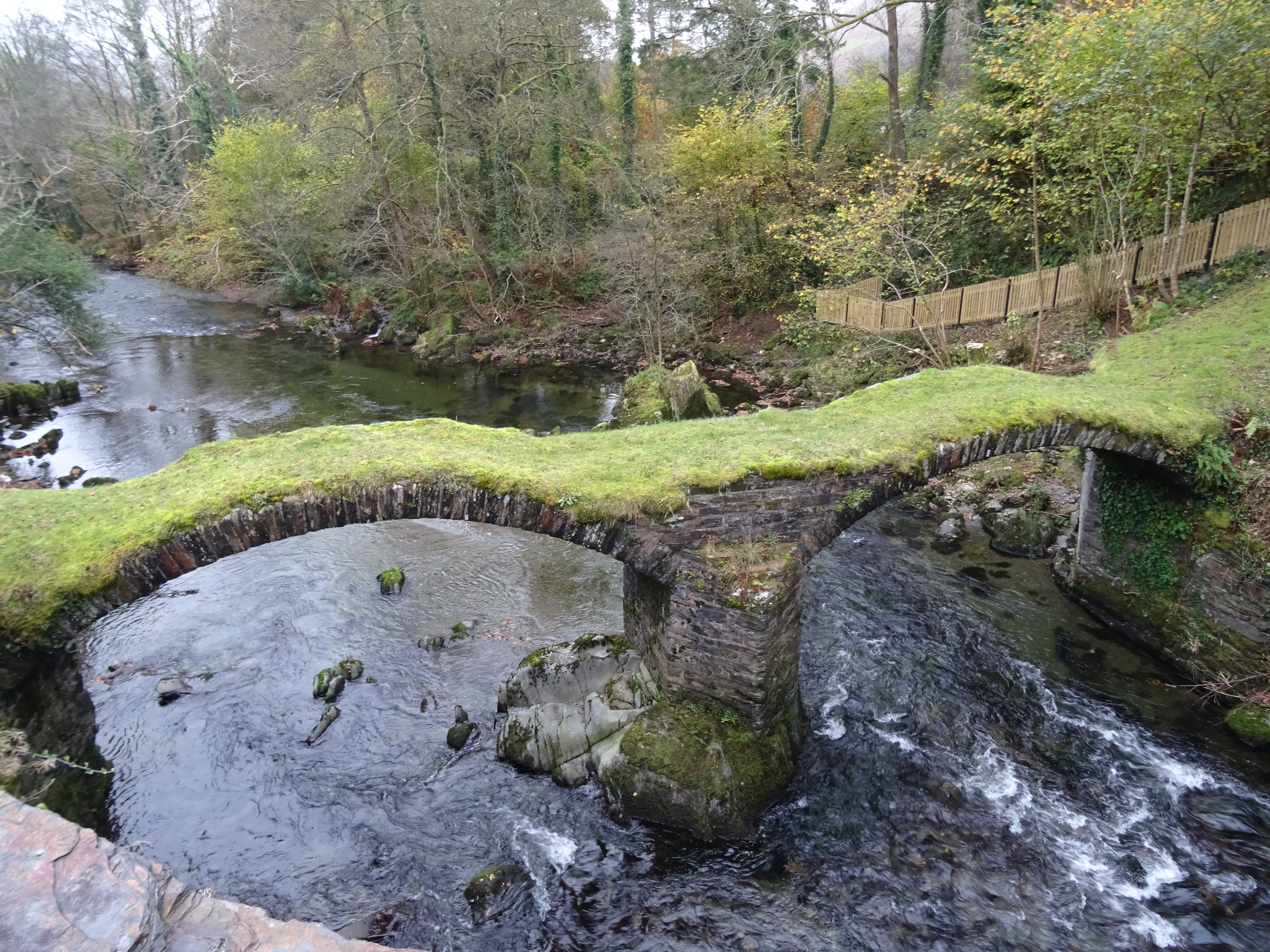
- Pont Minllyn viewed from the north
- Coordinates: 52.7106°N 3.6891°W
- Crosses: River Dyfi
- Locale: Gwynedd, Wales
- Heritage status: Grade II listed, Scheduled monument

History
- Opened: 17th century

Location
- Interactive map of Pont Minllyn

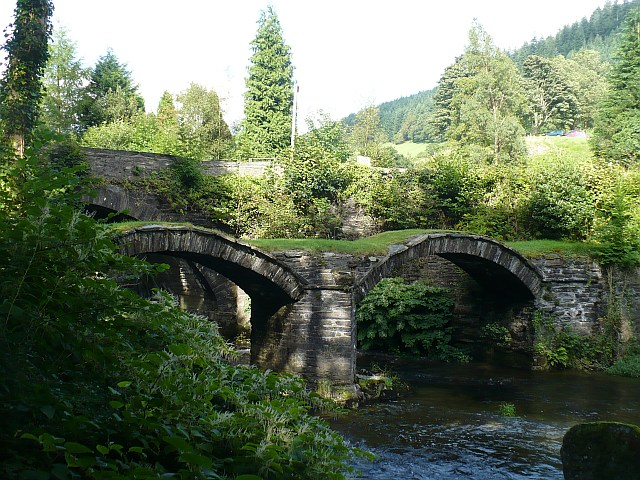
Pont Minllyn in the foreground viewed from the south

Pont Minllyn (also known as Pont-y-Ffinant, Pontrusk Bridge or the Packhorse Bridge) is a bridge spanning the River Dyfi, south of the village of Dinas Mawddwy, in Gwynedd, Wales. It was built by John Davies, rector of Mallwyd between 1603 and 1644 and a famed Welsh scholar who wrote a Welsh grammar and worked on early Welsh translations of the Bible and the Book of Common Prayer. Pont Minllyn was designed as a packhorse bridge to facilitate the transportation of goods. It is a Grade II listed building and a Scheduled monument.

== History and description ==
Dr John Davies (c. 1567–1644) was born in Llanferres, Denbighshire, and graduated from Jesus College, Oxford, in 1594. In 1604 he was appointed rector at Mallwyd, Gwynedd, where he served until his death in 1644. He is believed to have been the main editor and reviser of the 1620 edition of the Welsh translation of the Bible and the 1621 edition of the Welsh translation of the Book of Common Prayer. The Gwynedd Pevsner records him as having paid for the construction of three bridges in the vicinity of Mallwyd. (Note: The Gwynedd Pevsner records Pont-Y-Cleifion as "the only survivor of three bridges built by Dr John Davies".)

Pont Minllyn was designed as a packhorse bridge to assist in the transportation of goods. It consists of two arches, with a central pier in the river, constructed from stone rubble. The bridge is no longer open to the public, having lost its roadway, and its span is now turfed, Pevsner describing the "grassy arches of marvellous delicacy". Cadw dates the bridge to around the 1630s, but Pevsner suggests it is a later replacement for a wooden bridge constructed for Davies. (Note: Pevser's details for Pont Minllyn appear in the entry for Dinas Mawddwy rather than that for Mallwyd, and the bridge is termed Pont-Y-Ffinant.) The Ancient Monuments website suggests that the original wooden bridge predates Davies, noting that it is shown on a map of 1578 in the Atlas of the Counties of England and Wales produced by Christopher Saxton. Pont Minllyn is both a Grade II listed structure and a Scheduled monument.

The bridge is now managed by the Welsh Government historic environment agency Cadw. It is not visible from the adjacent A470 but can be seen from the adjacent footbridge and from a viewing platform to the south.

== Sources ==
- Haslam, Richard; Orbach, Julian; Voelcker, Adam (2009). Gwynedd: Anglesey, Caernarvonshire and Merioneth. The Buildings of Wales. New Haven, US and London: Yale University Press. ISBN 978-0-300-14169-6. OCLC 552084869.
