= Dyfi Bridge =

Bridge in Wales

Dyfi Bridge Welsh: Pont ar Ddyfi
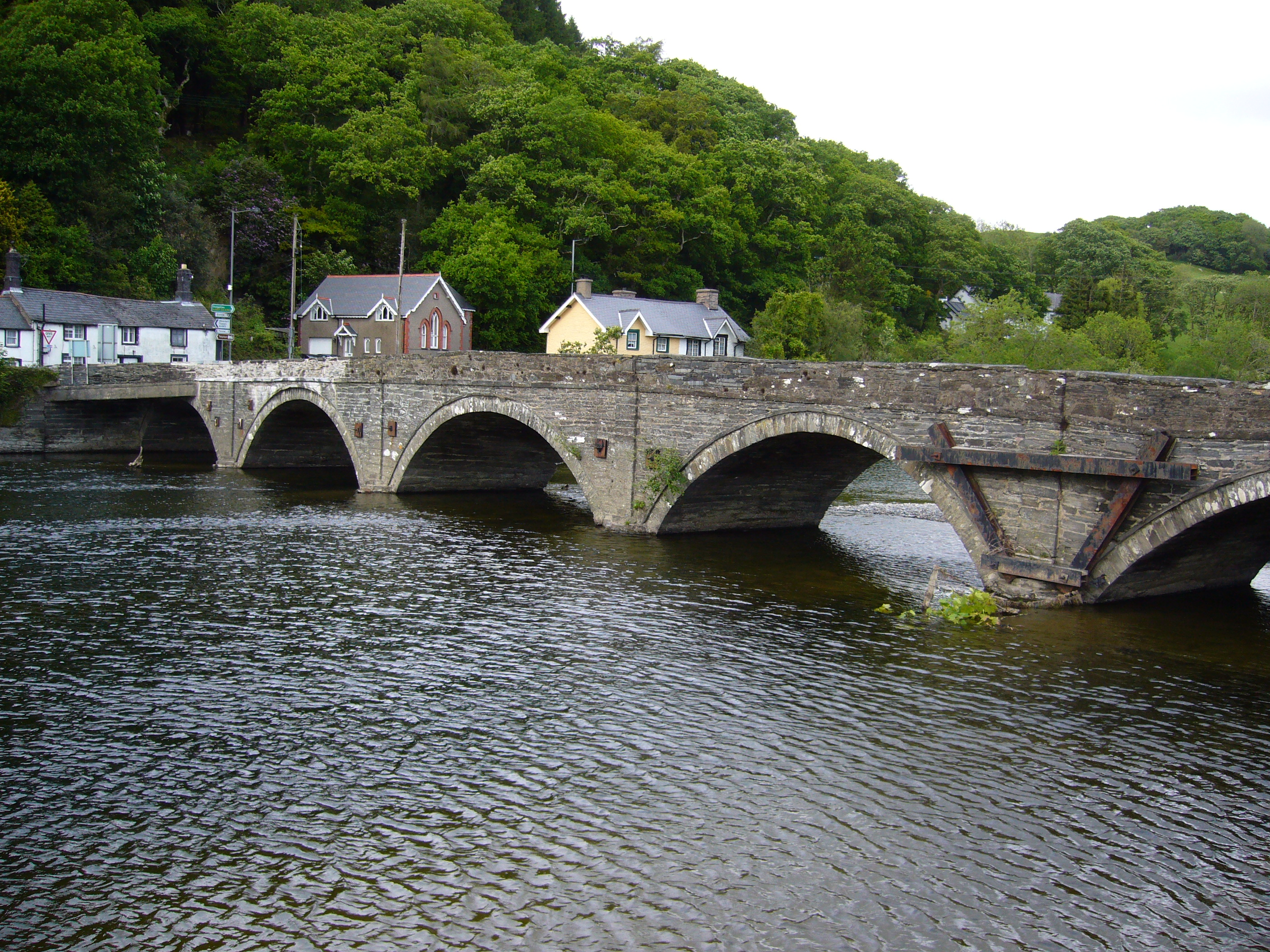
- West side of the bridge
- Coordinates: 52.6005°N 3.8557°W
- OS grid reference: SH744019
- Carries: 82; Wales Coast Path
- Crosses: River Dyfi
- Locale: Machynlleth
- Heritage status: Scheduled monument; Grade II* listed

Characteristics
- Total length: 64 m (210 ft)
- Width: 5.5 m (18 ft)
- No. of spans: 5

History
- Inaugurated: 1681
- Rebuilt: 1805

Location
- Interactive map of Dyfi Bridge

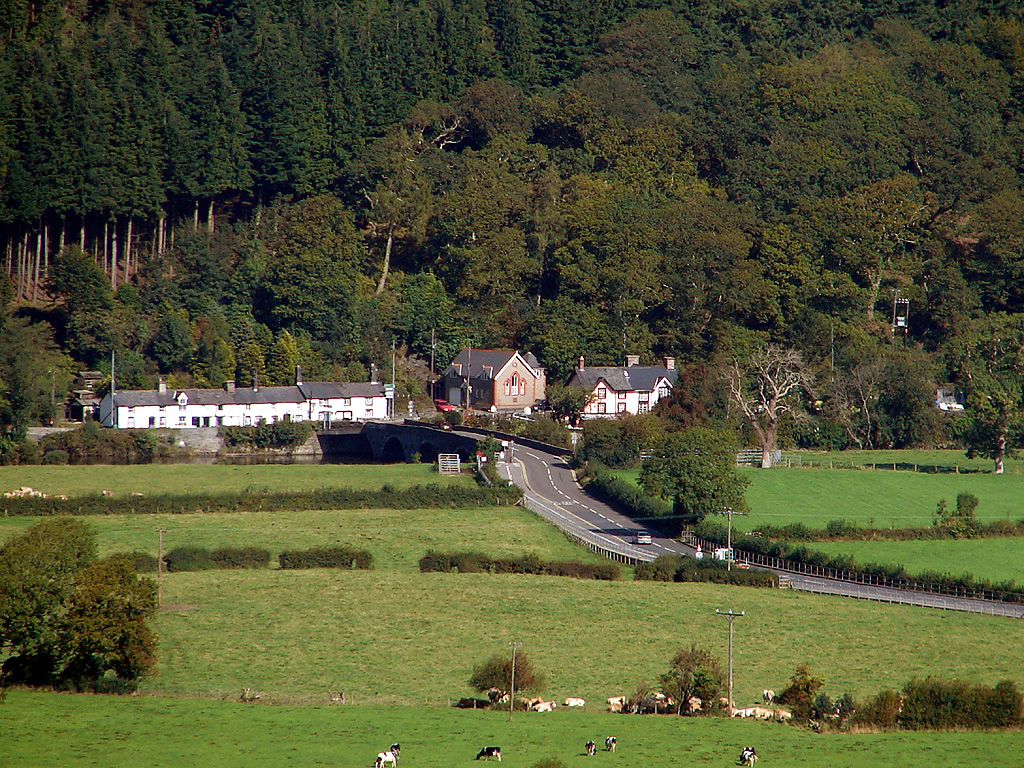
Crossing between Powys and Gwynedd

The Dyfi Bridge (Welsh: Pont ar Ddyfi), also known as the Machynlleth Bridge, Dovey Bridge, Pont Dyfi or Pont ar Dyfi, is a road bridge across the River Dyfi north of Machynlleth, Powys, Wales. It is described as "one of the finest bridges in Montgomeryshire" by the Gwynedd Archaeological Trust.

== History and description ==
The bridge was initially a timber bridge, built in 1533 using £6 13s 4d (10 marks) given by London merchant Geoffry Hughes. It was rebuilt in stone in 1681 and rebuilt again in 1805. The bridge is a scheduled monument and received a Grade II* heritage listing in 1952.

The bridge carried the A487 road across the River Dyfi between Machynlleth (Montgomeryshire/Powys) and the Corris community (Merionethshire/Gwynedd) prior to the opening of the New Dyfi Bridge upstream, after which it was closed off to vehicular traffic and the access road on the south side downgraded to an unclassified route, serving the adjacent fields, with responsibility for maintenance transferred to the local authorities. The bridge has five arches, with the two arches at the Machynlleth end reinforced with modern steelwork. It is 5.5 metres (18 ft) wide and 64 metres (210 ft) long.

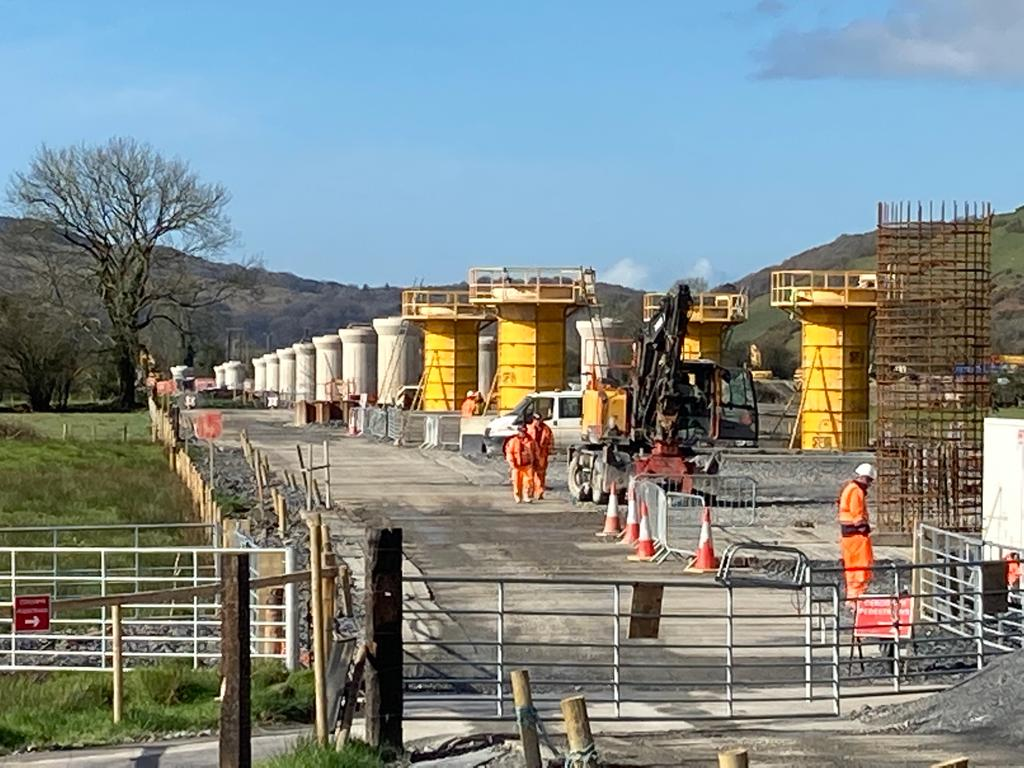
Steel formwork in place during the column construction of the new bridge.

== New bridge ==
In 2011 a report was drawn up recommending the bridge was replaced or widened because of its strategic importance, as it had unsafe low parapets and a lack of footways, and had been repeatedly damaged by motor vehicles because of its poor sightlines. The recommendations were dismissed in favour of looking at options for a new bridge at a different location.

In June 2015 the Welsh Government awarded Alun Griffiths Contractors Ltd the Early Contractor Involvement (ECI) contract for the A487 New Dyfi Bridge scheme. The ECI team included Arup as lead designer. On 19 May 2017 the Welsh government published a statement that a new bridge would be constructed about 500 m upstream from the current bridge. Work was scheduled to start near the end of 2018 and the completion of the bridge (being ready for traffic) was envisaged in the summer of 2020. The start date was subsequently delayed till at least 2019, with a public enquiry possibly required depending on the results of consultation. On 13 January 2020 the Welsh government announced that there would be no public enquiry, and construction would start in the summer of 2020 with estimated completion in summer 2022. Construction started in spring 2021 on a 1.2km long single carriageway road starting at the northern edge of Machynlleth, which traversing the Dyfi floodplain and the river itself on a 724m long elevated viaduct. The viaduct comprises 20 spans of steel and concrete construction, supported by pairs of circular reinforced concrete columns on piled foundations. Special Formwork designed and manufactured the bespoke fluted steel column formwork for the reinforced concrete columns used in the construction of the new Dyfi Bridge.

The new bridge, named New Dyfi Bridge (Welsh: Pont Dyfi Newydd), was opened on 2 February 2024 by Welsh Deputy Minister for Climate Change Lee Waters MS to vehicle traffic and pedestrians.
