= Seaham Hall =

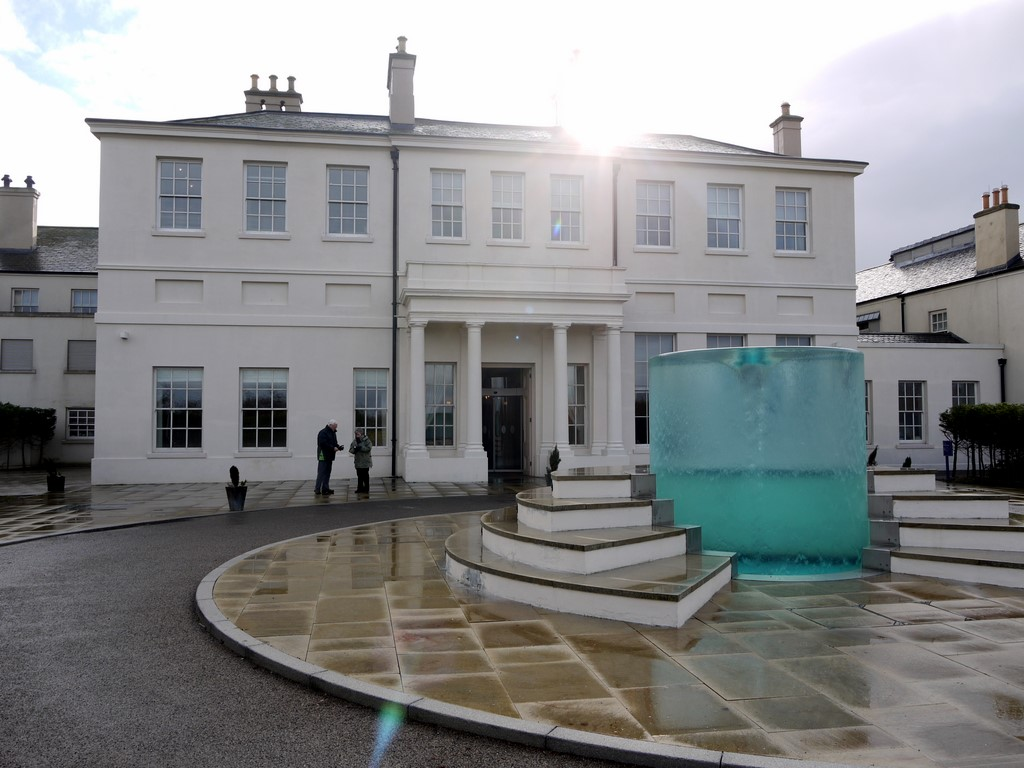
- Seaham Hall Hotel. (The water feature in the foreground is named 'Charybdis')

- Location in County Durham

General information
- Location: Seaham, County Durham, England, UK
- Coordinates: 54°50′53″N 1°20′47″W
- OS grid: NZ421505

Seaham Hall is an English country house and today it is a luxury five-star hotel and spa resort in County Durham

== History ==
Seaham Hall was built in the 1790s by Sir Ralph Milbanke, 6th Baronet. In 1815 the poet Lord Byron married Anne Isabella Milbanke at Seaham Hall. The fruit of their marriage was Ada Lovelace, the mathematician and pioneer of computing.

=== Londonderry ===
Seaham Hall was one of the many properties acquired by Charles Vane, 3rd Marquess of Londonderry, through his second marriage to Lady Frances Vane-Tempest in 1819. She was one of the greatest heiresses of the time. She stood to inherit nearly 65,000 acres (260 km^{2}). They purchased the Seaham estate in 1821 from Sir Ralph for £63,000, and developed it into what is now the modern harbour town of Seaham. This town was designed to rival nearby Sunderland. The title Viscount Seaham was created as a courtesy title for the eldest son of the marriage, who became Earl Vane on his father's death; however, when the 4th Marquess died childless, Earl Vane inherited the Londonderry titles and his eldest son took the courtesy title Viscount Castlereagh.

However, for much of his life the 5th Marquess lived at Plas Machynlleth, his wife's home in Montgomeryshire. The family did not spend much time at Seaham but used their Irish house - Mount Stewart, which was more impressive.

Benjamin Disraeli visited Seaham Hall in 1861.

Following the death of the 6th Marquess in 1915, his son, the 7th Marquess, put the hall at the disposal of the authorities to use as a hospital during the Great War, and it subsequently continued in use as a general hospital before closing in 1978.

== Modern use ==
The building during the 1980s and 1990s has been redeveloped as a hotel, a nursing home and finally a luxury five-star hotel and spa.

In 1984, it was acquired by the Jalal family of Sunderland, who worked at rebuilding, renovating and returning the deteriorated building to its former glory. It was opened in 1985 as the Seaham Hall Hotel and remained in the hands of the Jalal family for nearly six years. In 1991, it was sold by the Jalal family to Dr Mohinder Singh Mullea, a local doctor who also owned Tara House, an old people's residential home, and was officially converted to an old people’s home in 1991.

In June 1997, Seaham Hall was purchased by a local businessman, Tom Maxfield, and his wife Jocelyn. Maxfield described the condition of the building as "disgustingly awful". The rundown, derelict building was transformed into the 5-star luxury hotel and spa and became part of the Tom's Company group of hotels.

In 2008 Seaham Hall was sold to Von Essen. After Von Essen entered into receivership the business was sold to a private investor.

Today, Seaham Hall is a hotel and spa on the Durham Heritage Coast. The Georgian house operates as a five-star hotel with suites and coastal lodges with private hot tubs. Facilities include the Serenity Spa, two restaurants (The Dining Room and Geko, a Japanese-inspired restaurant), Harvey’s Bar, Aesthetics Clinic and meeting and events space. The estate also includes privately owned residences.

The hotel holds AA Inspectors’ Choice five red star status, and the Serenity Spa is rated five bubbles by the Good Spa Guide. In 2026, Seaham Hall was awarded one Michelin Key in the Michelin Guide’s hotel selection, the same year the hotel marked its 25th anniversary..

== See also ==
- Londonderry House
- Mount Stewart
- Plas Machynlleth
- Wynyard Park
- Loring Hall
