= Dafydd Llwyd ap Llywelyn ap Gruffudd (Dafydd Llwyd o Fathafarn) =

Dafydd Llwyd ap Llywelyn ap Gruffudd, usually referred to as Dafydd Llwyd o Fathafarn (fl. c.1400–c.1490) was a Welsh language poet, a native of Mathafarn, Powys.

The bulk of Dafydd Llwyd's surviving poetry is characterised by his hopes and aspirations for a Mab Darogan ('Son of Prophecy') who would throw off the yoke of English rule and realise the restoration of an independent Wales. He was recognised as the leading authority on the prophetic lore and traditional history of Wales and was widely consulted. Like other prophetic poets of his period, Dafydd attached his hopes initially on Jasper Tudor, Earl of Pembroke, and then on his nephew Henry Tudor. Following his success at the Battle of Bosworth Dafydd composed poems in praise of Henry, his son Arthur and to Sir Rhys ap Thomas, their leading Welsh supporter and advisor.

He also composed a number of erotic poems, notably a poetic disputation with the poet Gwerful Mechain, as well as religious and secular praise poems.

== Bibliography ==
- W. L. Richards (ed.), Gwaith Dafydd Llwyd o Fathafarn (University of Wales Press, 1964). The edited texts, in Welsh.
