= Straw man (dummy) =

Dummy in the shape of a human

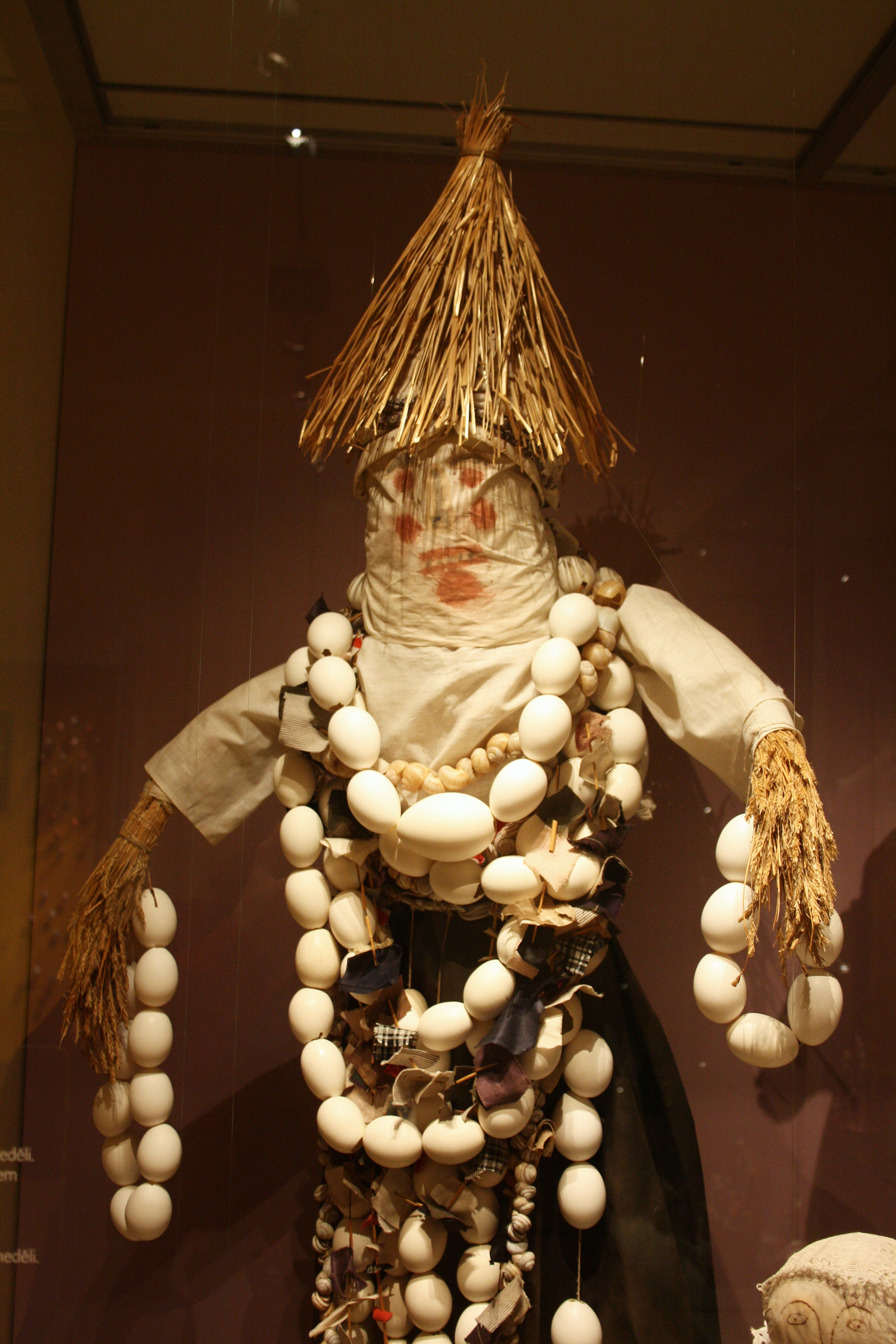
Effigy of Morana, a Slavic death goddess, in the Czech Republic

A straw man (ritual doll) is a dummy in the shape of a human usually made up entirely out of straw material, or created by stuffing straw into clothes.

== Uses ==
Straw men are commonly used as scarecrows, combat training targets, swordsmiths' test targets, effigies to be burned, and as rodeo dummies to distract bulls.

== UK ==
In the United Kingdom, a straw dummy representing Guy Fawkes is burnt as an effigy on Guy Fawkes Night, the anniversary of the Gunpowder Plot.

== Rodeo straw men ==
In the sport of rodeo, the straw man is a dummy, originally made of a shirt and pants stuffed with straw. The straw man is placed in the arena during bullriding events as a safety measure. It is intended to distract the bull after the rider has dismounted (or has been thrown), with the idea that the bull will attack the straw man rather than attack its former rider. Two so-called rodeo clowns – people dressed in bright colors whose job it is to distract the bull if the rider is injured – are in the ring as well and are usually far more effective than the straw man.

== See also ==
- Scarecrow
- Voodoo doll
