= Celtica (visitor centre) =

Former guest centre in Machynlleth, Wales

- Formation: 1995
- Dissolved: 2006
- Type: Educational guest centre
- Headquarters: Plas Machynlleth
- Location: Machynlleth, Wales, SY20 8ER, United Kingdom
- Coordinates: 52.5884°N 3.8532°W
- Region served: Powys

Celtica was an educational guest centre located in Machynlleth, Wales. Formed in 1995, Celtica provided domestic and foreign tourists with information on Celtic life through detailed dioramas of a round-house village, the opening times were 10am - 6pm. After consistent low visitor turnout and failure to secure funding, Celtica closed in March 2006. The site was managed by Tecwyn V. Jones until 2000.

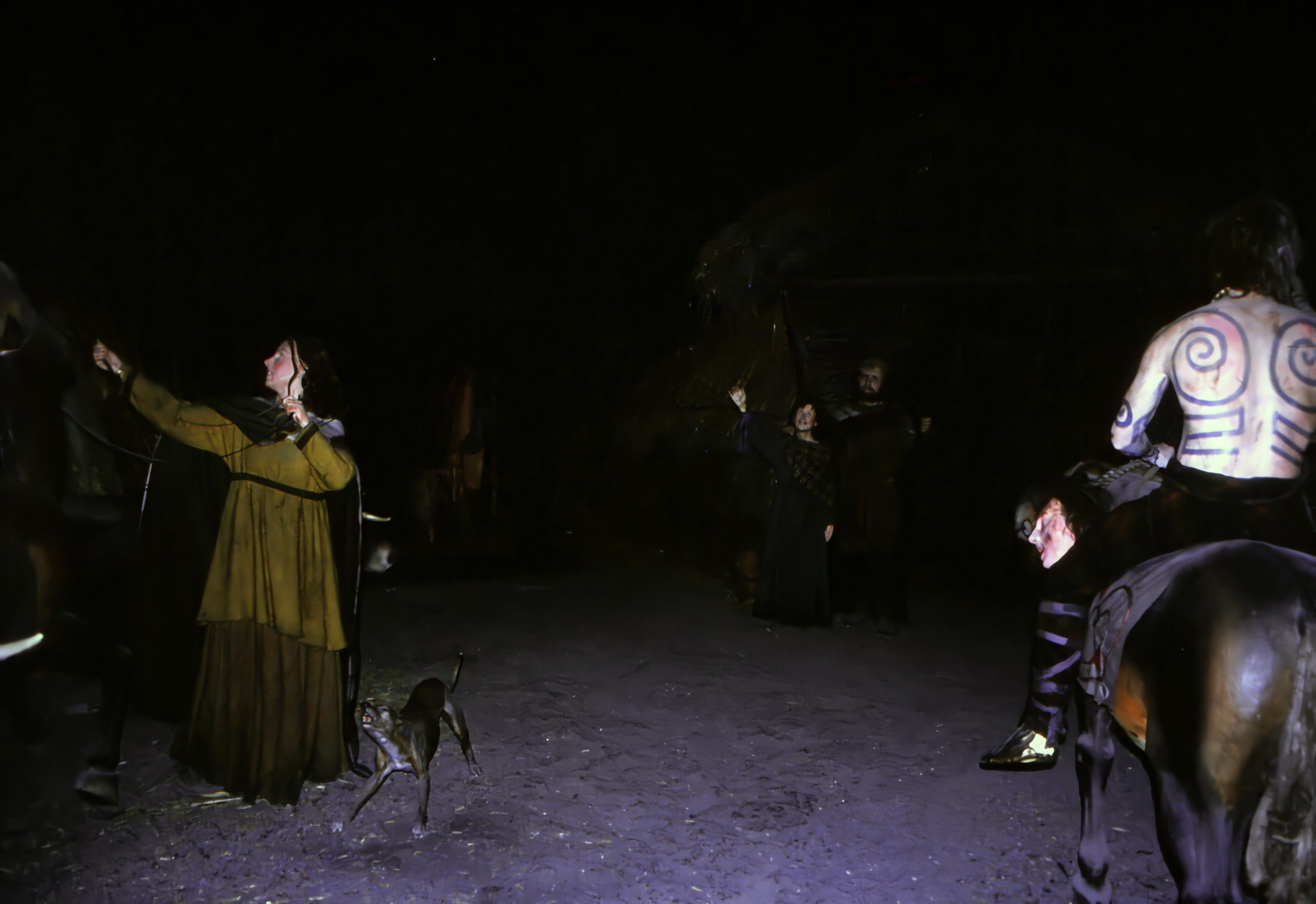
Image depicting a Celtic settlement within the centre, The setting was always set to a dim lighting, focusing only on the subjects to enhance the experience

== History ==
Celtica Guest Centre was first developed by the District Council of Montgomeryshire, who took over Plas Machynlleth for the project. The vision of Celtica was to re-imagine Celtic life through a diorama of life in a Celtic settlement. Figures of men, women, children, and animals were placed around a dimly lit round-house village, which was built within a purpose-built extension to the Plas. To add a sense of realism to the set, there was a continuous audio loop playing sounds of people shouting, fighting, children playing, dogs barking, as well as sounds of fire and ironmongery. The cost of this visitor centre was ~£3-million and was partially funded via a grant by the European Union. The centre was officially opened in 1995 by Bryn Terfel.

When Powys was formed as a unitary authority in 1997, the County Council took over Celtica. The centre attracted tourists, school groups, and conferences; however, initial visitor number predictions proved to be too ambitious and the council was unwilling to prolong its subsidy after years of consistent budget deficits. With little scope for alternative investment, Celtica closed in March 2006, and the house stood empty while Powys County Council sought to relinquish responsibility for it in line with their policy of selling many of their publicly owned assets.

At the time of Celtica's closure, Machynlleth Town Council began discussions with Powys County Council with a view of the Town Council taking ownership of the Plas. On 1 April 2008, in a move thought to be unprecedented for a community council of its size, Macynlleth Town Council took ownership of the Plas, its parkland, and its facilities. It has since reopened as a community centre with a locally licensed restaurant, a large community meeting hall, as well as office and conference space available for hire.
