= Machynlleth =

Market town in Powys, Wales

- Market town
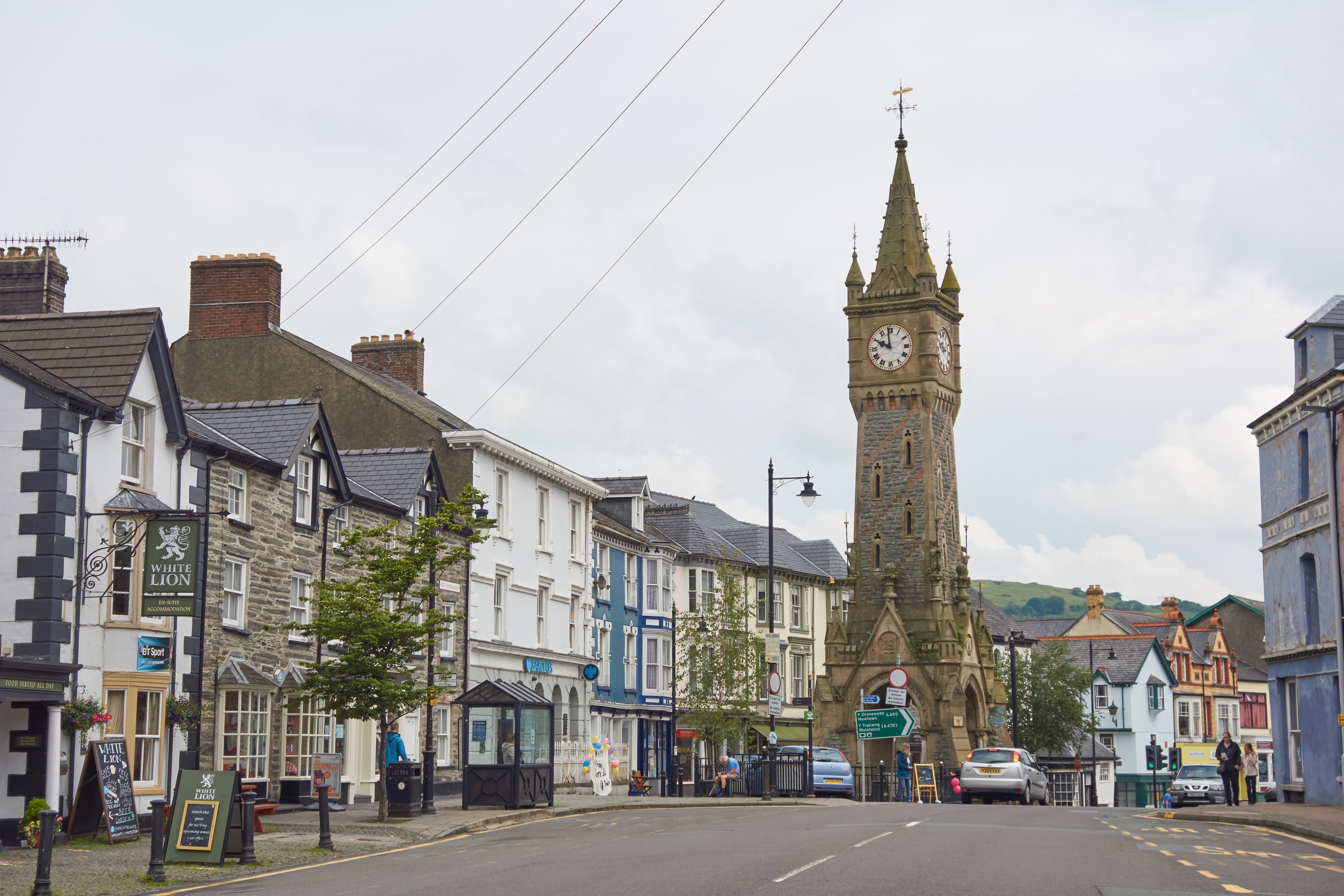
- Machynlleth Clock Tower

- Location within Powys
- Population: 2,235 (2011)
- OS grid reference: SH745005
- Community: Machynlleth
- Principal area: Powys
- Preserved county: Powys
- Country: Wales
- Sovereign state: United Kingdom
- Post town: MACHYNLLETH
- Postcode district: SY20
- Dialling code: 01654
- Police: Dyfed-Powys
- Fire: Mid and West Wales
- Ambulance: Welsh
- UK Parliament: Montgomeryshire and Glyndŵr
- Senedd Cymru – Welsh Parliament: Gwynedd Maldwyn
- List of places UK Wales Powys 52.591°N 3.849°W Community map: Map of the community

Machynlleth (Welsh: [maˈχənɬɛθ]) is a market town, community and electoral ward in Powys, Wales, and within the historic boundaries of Montgomeryshire. It is in the Dyfi Valley at the intersection of the A487 and the A489 roads. It has a population of 2,098 (2024 mid-year estimate). At the 2001 Census it had a population of 2,147, rising to 2,235 in 2011 and falling slightly to 2,163 in 2021. It is sometimes referred to colloquially as Mach.

Machynlleth was the seat of Owain Glyndŵr's Welsh Parliament in 1404, and as such claims to be the "ancient capital of Wales". However, it has never held any official recognition as a capital. It applied for city status in 2000 and 2002, but was unsuccessful. It is twinned with Belleville, Michigan.

Machynlleth hosted the National Eisteddfod in 1937 and 1981. The town falls within the catchment area and is involved in the 2027 Maldwyn Meirionnydd National Eisteddford to be held in nearby Glanytwymyn.

== Toponymy ==
The origin of the name Machynlleth derives from ma [field, plain] and Cynllaith, a personal name.

== History ==
There is a long history of human activity in the Machynlleth area. In the late 1990s, radiocarbon dating showed that copper was being mined in the Early Bronze Age (c. 2,750 years ago), within 1 mile (1.6 km) of the town centre.

The Romans settled in the area; they built a fort at Cefn Caer, near Pennal, 2.5 miles (4 km) west of Machynlleth, and are reputed to have had two look-out posts above the town at Bryn-y-gog and Wylfa, and another fort, called Maglona, at Machynlleth. One of the earliest written references to Machynlleth is the Royal charter granted in 1291 by Edward I to Owen de la Pole, Lord of Powys. This gave him the right to hold "a market at Machynlleth every Wednesday for ever and two fairs every year". The Wednesday market is still a busy and popular day in Machynlleth 700 years later.

The Royal House, which stands on the corner of the Garsiwn, is another of the mediaeval houses that can still be seen today. According to local tradition, Dafydd Gam, a Welsh ally of the English kings, was imprisoned here from 1404 to 1412 for attempting to assassinate Owain Glyndŵr. After his release by Glyndŵr, ransomed Gam fought alongside Henry V at the Battle of Agincourt and is named amongst the dead in Shakespeare's Henry V. The name Royal House undoubtedly refers to the tradition that Charles I stayed at the house in 1643.

The weekly market and biannual fair thrived, and in 1613 drew complaints from other towns whose trading in cloth was being severely affected. A document dated 1632 shows that animals for sale came from all over Merionethshire, Montgomeryshire, Cardiganshire, Carmarthenshire and Denbighshire, and prospective buyers came from Flintshire, Radnorshire, Brecknockshire, Herefordshire and Shropshire, in addition to the above.

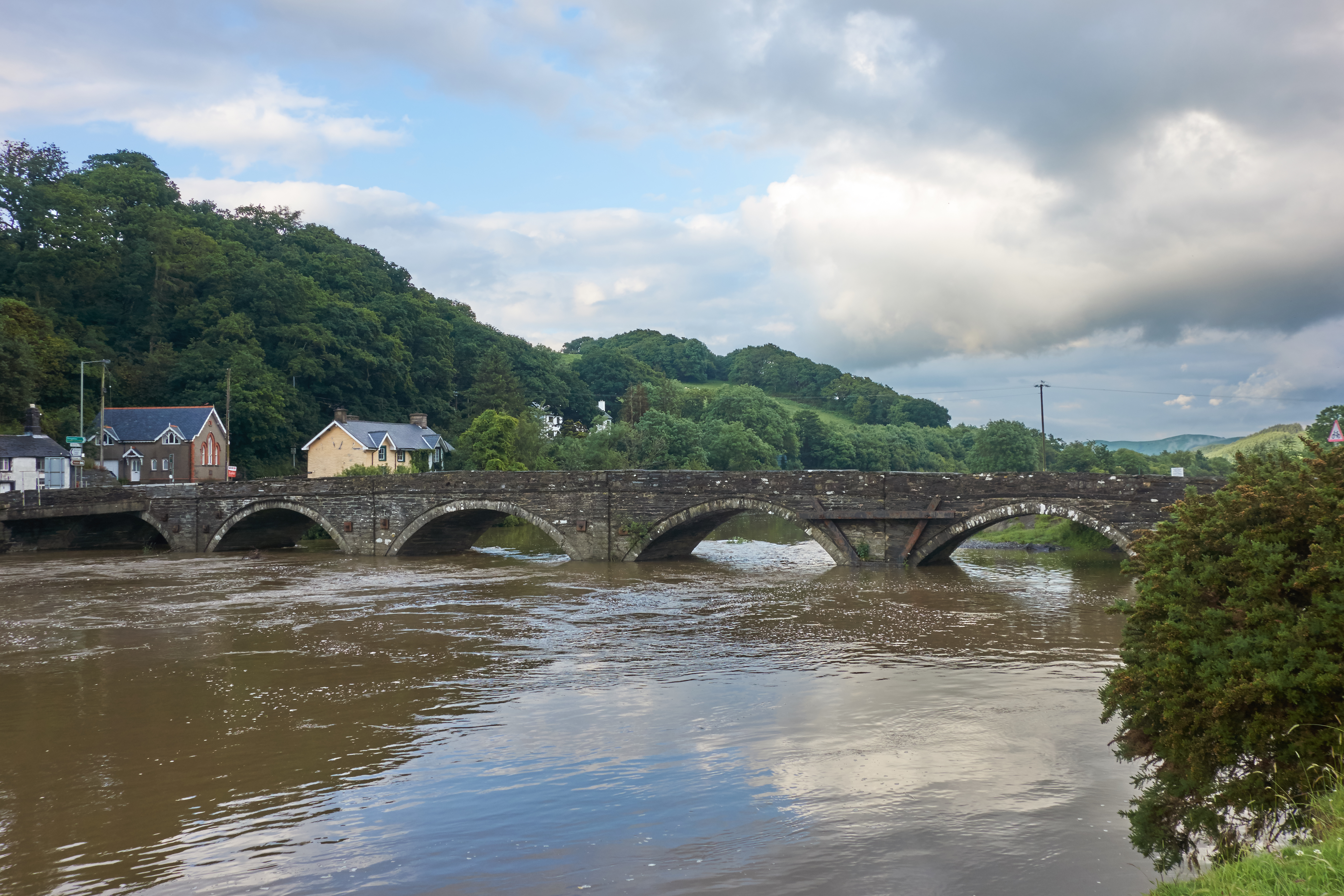
Dyfi Bridge

The Dyfi Bridge (Welsh: Pont ar Ddyfi) was first mentioned in 1533, by Geoffrey Hughes, who left £6 13s 4d (ten marks) towards the making of the bridge.

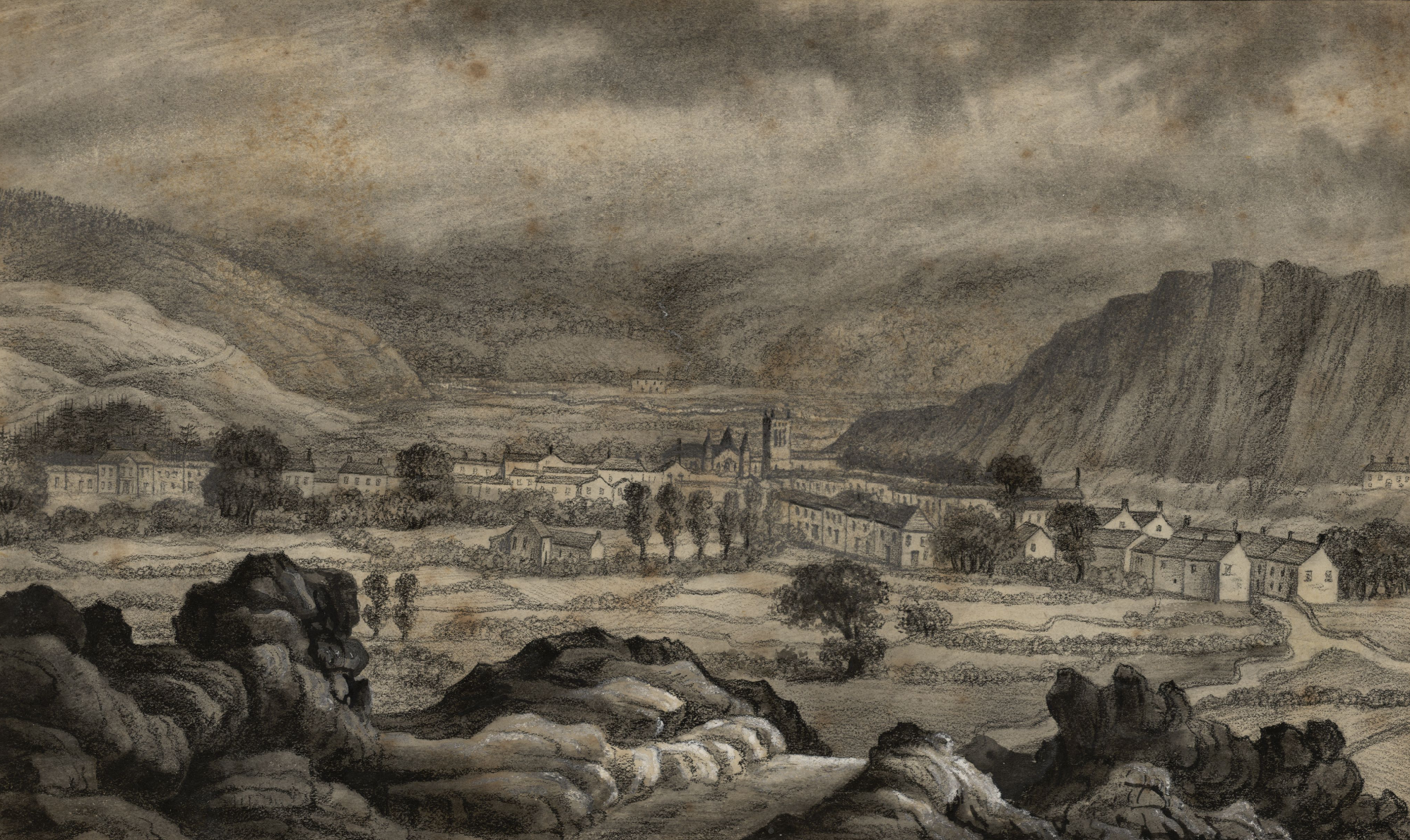
Machynlleth, c. 1830

Rowland Pugh was the Lord of Meirionedd, and lived at Mathafarn about two miles east of Machynlleth. Pugh supported the Royalist side in the English Civil War. On 2 November 1644, Sir Thomas Myddleton of Chirk Castle was marching on Machynlleth with a force of the Parliamentarian army, when he was ambushed by a force organised by Pugh. In retaliation for the attack, Myddleton burned down Mathafarn on 29 November 1644, along with a number of houses in Machynlleth.

Laura Ashley's first shop was opened in Machynlleth (at 35 Maengwyn Street) in 1961.

The disappearance of April Jones in October 2012 received a large amount of coverage in the UK media.

=== Plas Machynlleth, the Londonderry family and the Clock Tower ===
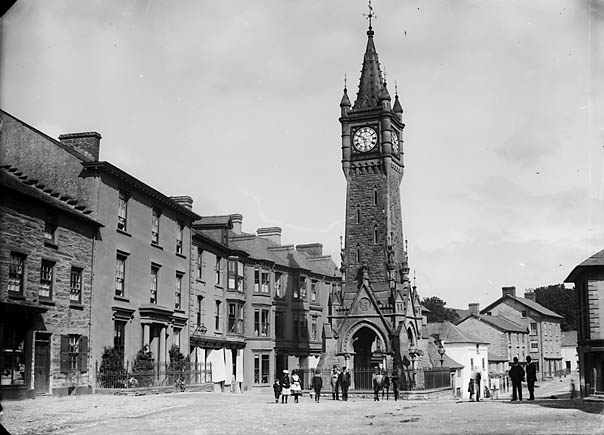
Machynlleth Clock Tower, circa 1885

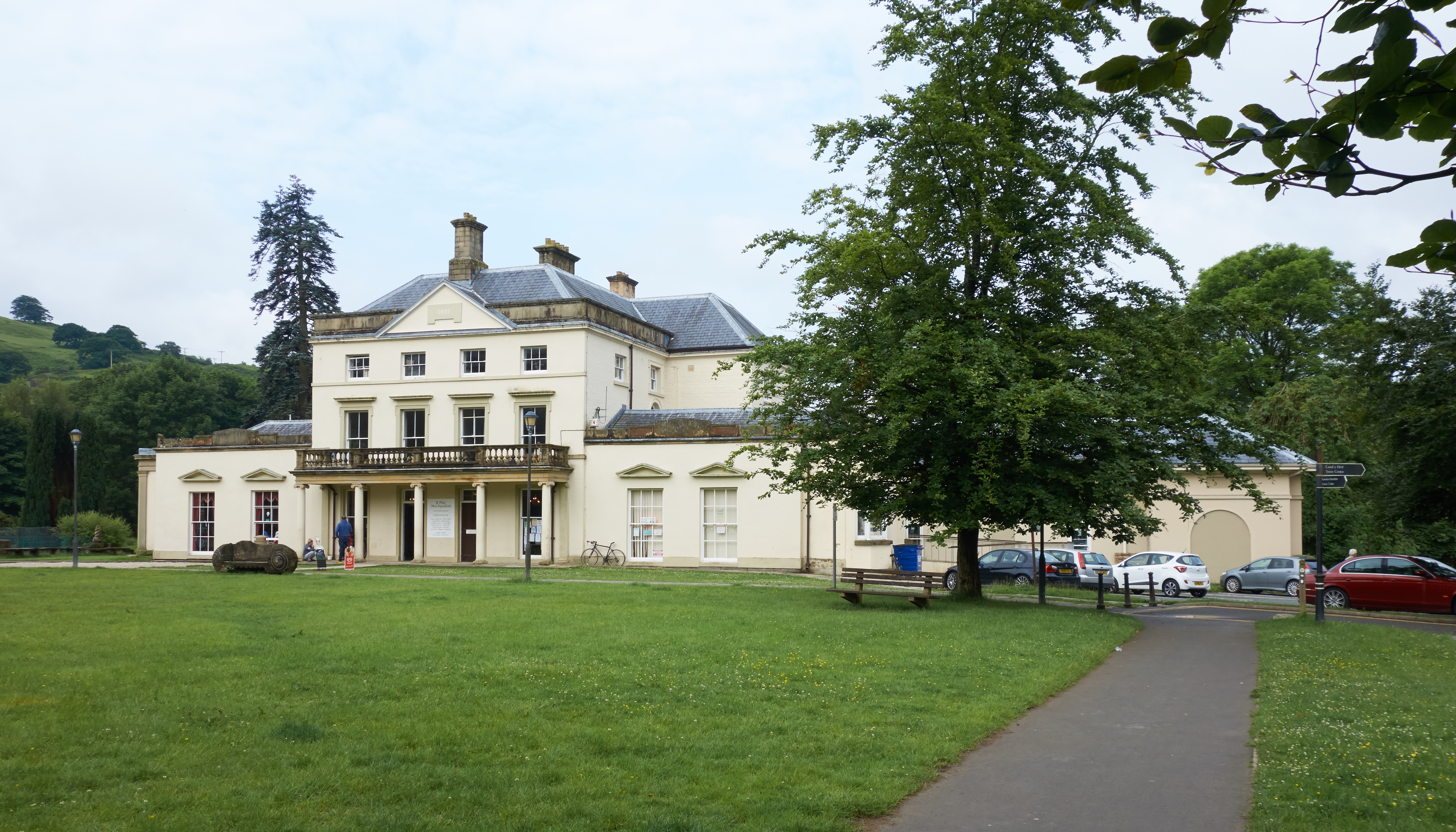
Y Plas, Machynlleth

In 1846 Mary Cornelia, the daughter of a local landowner Sir John Edwards married Viscount Seaham, the second son of the third Marquess of Londonderry and they set up home at Plas Machynlleth. Seaham became Earl Vane on the death of his father and the fifth Marquess on the death of his half-brother.

To celebrate the 21st birthday of the Seahams’ eldest son, Viscount Castlereagh, the townspeople paid for the clock tower which stands at the town's main road intersection. Erected on the site of the old town hall, it stands at 23.7m tall and has become the symbol of the town. The foundation stone was laid on 15 July 1874 amid great festivities. The clock tower, designed by Henry Kennedy of Bangor and now a Grade II listed monument, cost £800; the townspeople raised £1,000, of which the remainder was spent planting trees along nearby streets. Meanwhile, a new town hall was erected on the east side of Penrallt Street in 1872; after becoming unsafe, it was demolished in 1968.

Another son, Lord Herbert Vane-Tempest, was the last member of the family to live at the Plas and was killed in the Abermule train collision on the Cambrian Railways, of which he was a director.

The house was given to the townspeople in December 1948 under the stewardship of the then Machynlleth Urban District Council.

Although many sources state that the foundation stone was laid in 1874, the clock tower’s own dedicatory plaque records that it was erected to commemorate the coming of age of Charles Stewart Vane‑Tempest, Viscount Castlereagh, on 15 July 1873. Local historical accounts and community records note that the public subscription that funded the tower also provided for street planting, and that the town celebrated its centenary in July 1973 on the basis of the 1873 date. The clock was constructed by Edward Edwards and his brother John Edwards, local builders whose families continued to live in Machynlleth and its surrounding area.

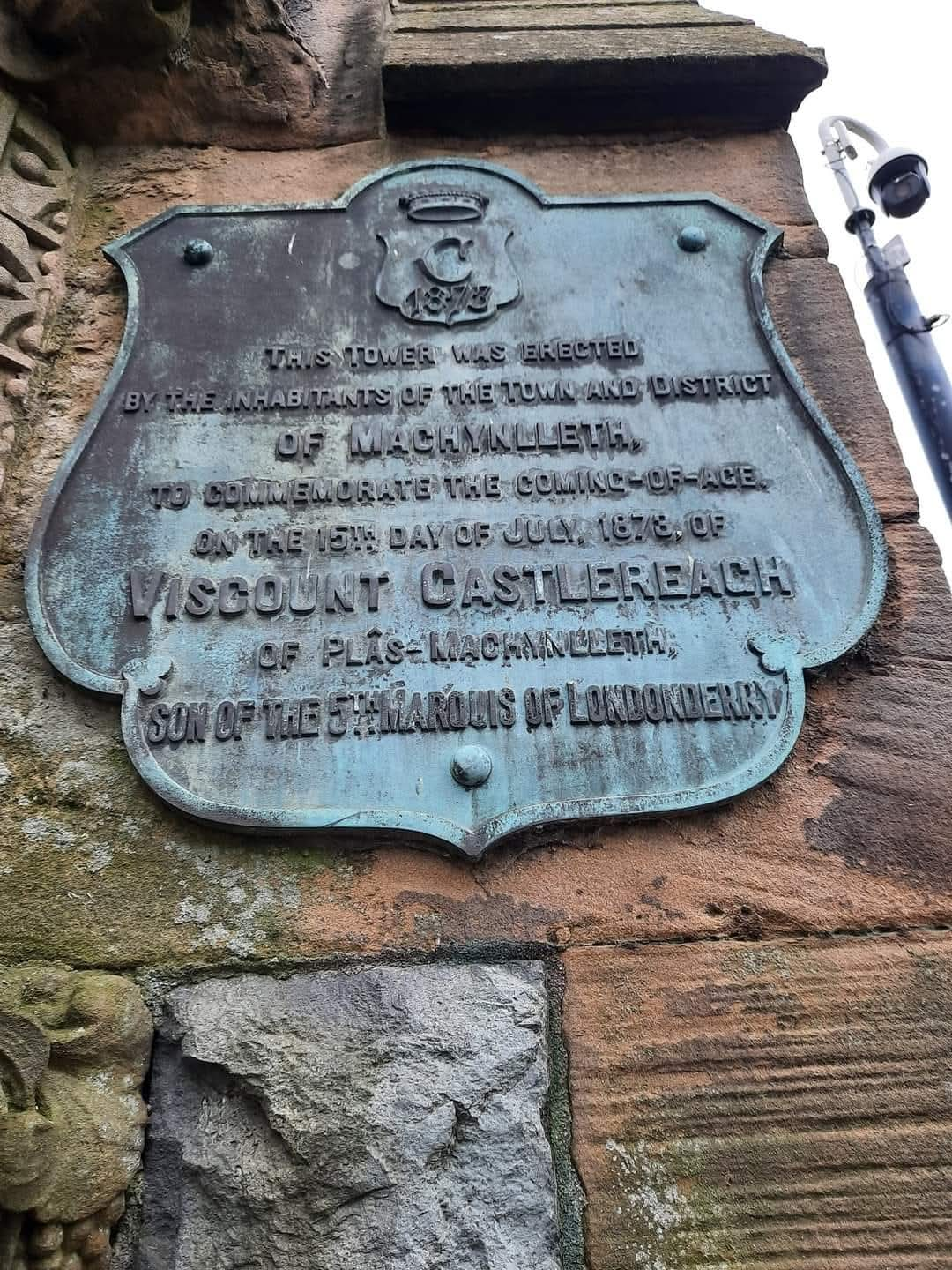
Dedicatory plaque on Machynlleth Town Clock, Powys, Wales. The inscription records that the tower commemorates the coming of age of Viscount Castlereagh on 15 July 1873.

==== Celtica ====
Various local government re-organisations saw responsibility for the Plas pass first to Montgomeryshire District Council, who in 1995 converted it into the Celtica visitor centre. Celtica interpreted the history and culture of the Celts with a walk-through audio-visual exhibition housed in a purpose-built addition to the house. The £3 million attraction was part-funded by the European Union. The centre had a high-profile in the Welsh media, with opera singer Bryn Terfel officially opening the attraction in October 1995.

Powys County Council took over Celtica and the house when it was formed as a unitary authority in 1997. The centre was successful in attracting tourists, school groups and conferences for a number of years; however initial predictions of visitor numbers proved to be too ambitious, and the council was unwilling to prolong its subsidy. With little scope for alternative investment, Celtica closed in March 2006, and the house stood empty while Powys County Council sought to relinquish responsibility for it in line with their policy of selling many of their publicly owned buildings.

On 1 April 2008, in a move thought to be unprecedented for a community council of its size, Machynlleth Town Council took ownership of the Plas and its parkland and facilities. It has reopened the restaurant by leasing it to a local licensee, and the 1st and 2nd floors of the main building are rented out as office space. Medium-sized meeting rooms and conference space are also offered for hire.

== Transport ==
Machynlleth railway station was built by the Newtown and Machynlleth Railway; it provides services to Aberystwyth and the Cambrian coast to the west, and Newtown and Shrewsbury to the east. Services are operated by Transport for Wales.

The town is home to the signalling centre that controls the European Rail Traffic Management System (ERTMS) on the Cambrian Line. The system went into full operational use in March 2011.

From 1859 to 1948, the town was served by the narrow-gauge Corris Railway, which brought slate from the quarries around Corris and Aberllefenni for onward despatch to the markets. The railway's original station, Machynlleth Town was on Brickfield Street, and operated from about 1860 to about 1874. It was replaced by a new station, opened in 1874, next to the mainline station. A new station building was built in 1905, and can still be seen alongside the road approaching the town from the north.

Machynlleth is served by two TrawsCymru long-distance bus routes. The T2 connects the town with Bangor to the north and continues to Aberystwyth, where connections can be made to South Wales. There is also the T12 which runs to Wrexham, via Newtown; this is branded as TrawsCymru Connect.

== Welsh language ==
Machynlleth retains its linguistic tradition, with Welsh spoken alongside English. The 2021 Census indicated that 62% of the population have some knowledge of Welsh, with 50.2% able to read, write and speak the language (compared to an average of 20% across all Wales).

== Owain Glyndŵr ==
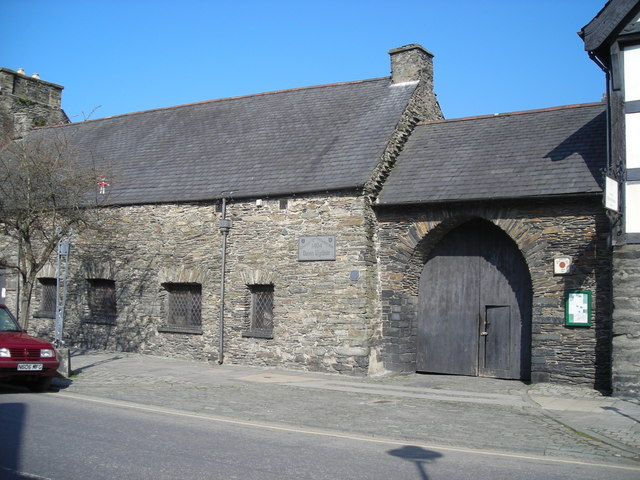
The building said to be Owain Glyndŵr's 1404 Parliament House

Machynlleth has a special role in Welsh history because of its connection with Owain Glyndŵr, a Prince of Wales who rebelled against the English during the reign of King Henry IV. Owain was crowned Prince of Wales in 1404 near the Parliament House, which is one of three mediaeval houses in town, in the presence of leaders from Scotland, France and Spain, and he held his own Parliament in the town. He held his last parliament in the nearby village of Pennal, by the Church of St Peter ad Vincula. It is thought that after the rebellion floundered, Owain went into hiding in the area around Machynlleth.

== Tourism and other economic activities ==
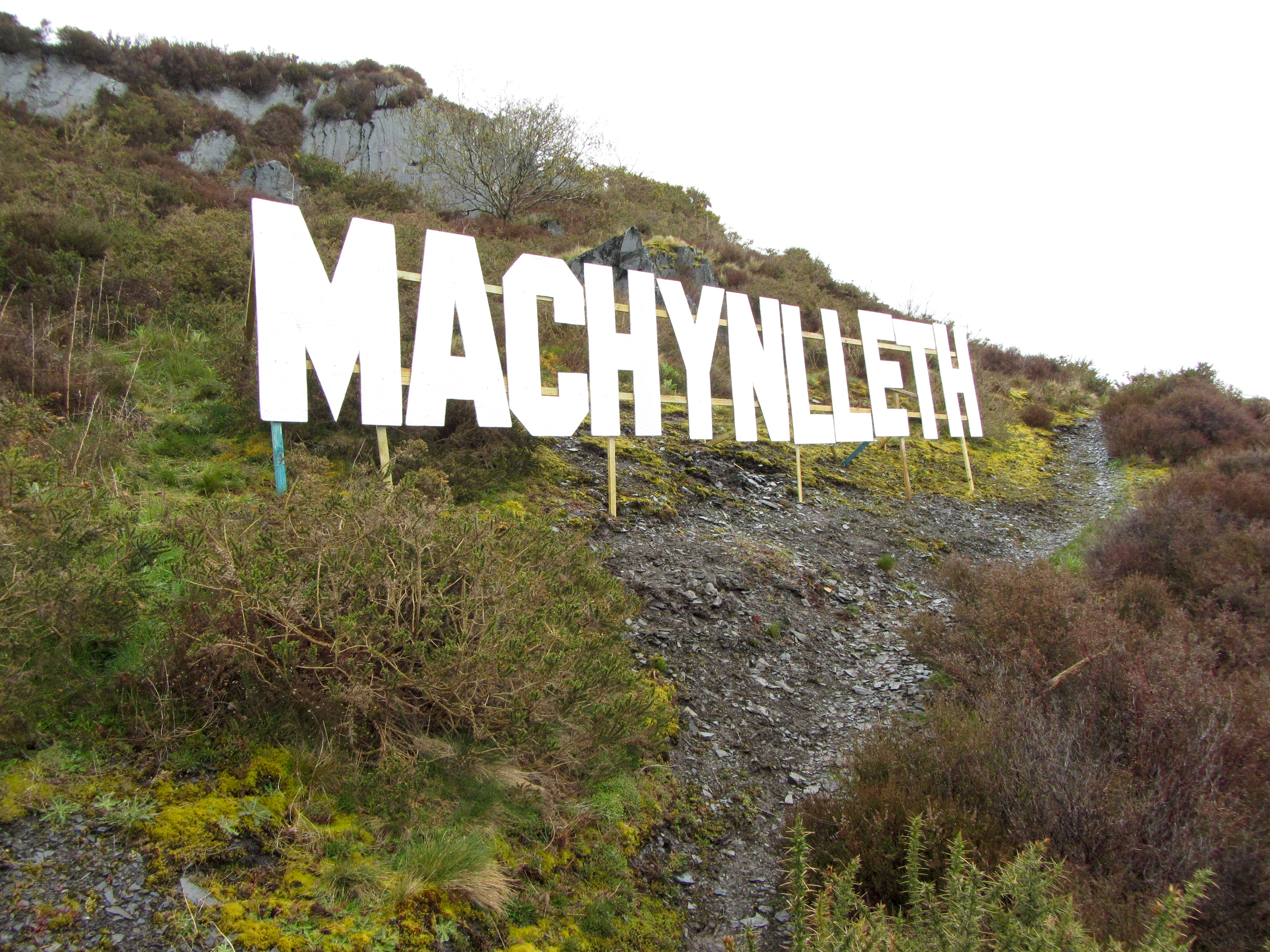
Machynlleth's "Hollywood Sign" was constructed in 2005 to celebrate a local film festival.

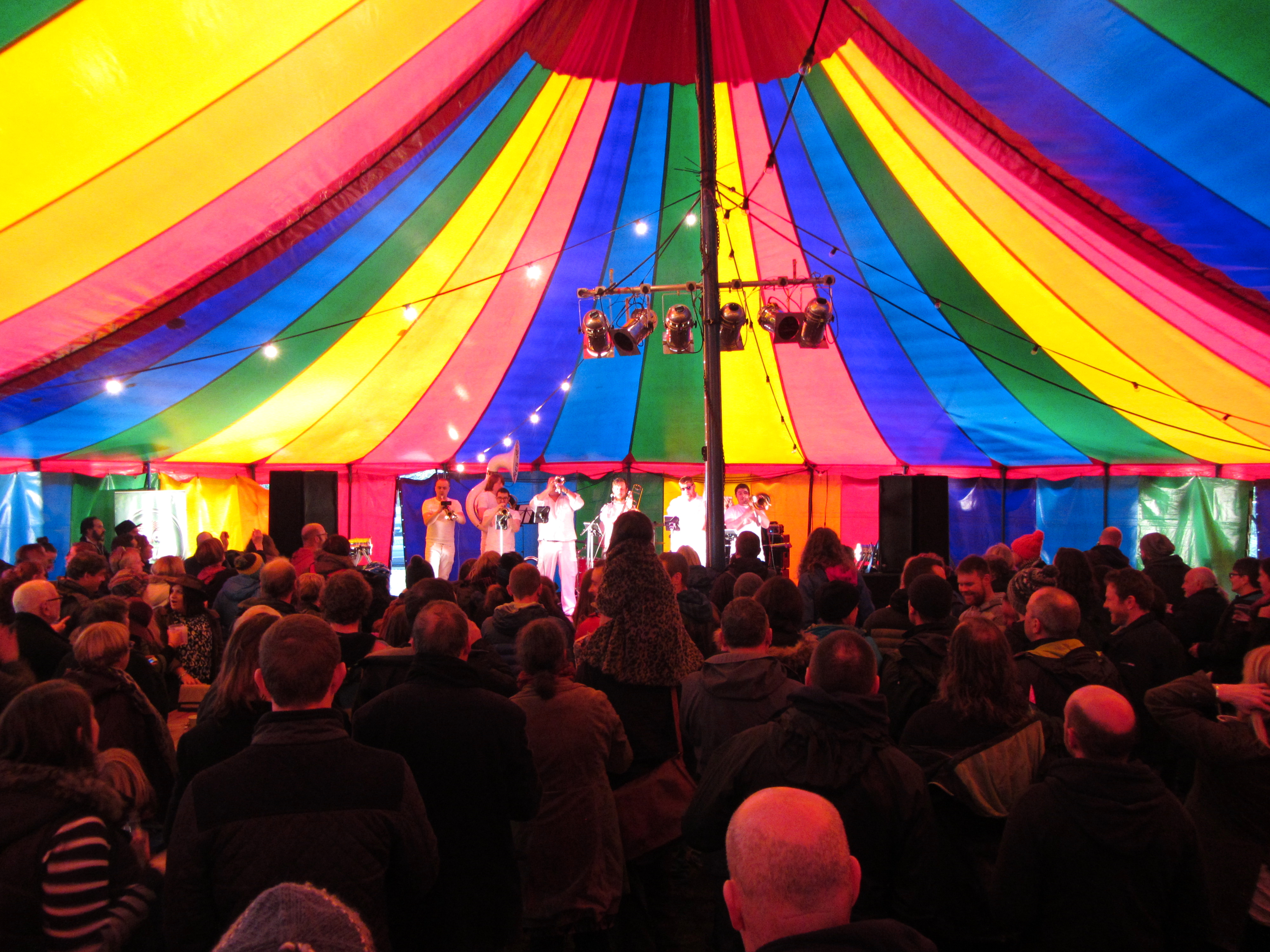
Performance at the 2016 comedy festival

Tourism is the primary employment sector with a range of activity based attractions (for example several mountain biking trails) as well as the visitor centre at the Centre for Alternative Technology. Agriculture continues to play a significant part in the make-up of the town and surrounding area.

The town has a market on Wednesdays which includes traditional Welsh, Spanish and French food stalls.

In March 2026 Machynlleth submitted a bid to be named as the first UK Town of Culture.

In May 2026 Led Zeppelin frontman Robert Plant backed Machynlleth's bid to become the UK Town of Culture.

The town has hosted the Machynlleth Comedy Festival annually since May 2010, featuring comedians such as Jon Richardson, Pappy's, Josie Long, Stewart Lee and Richard Herring. The festival dominates the town for a weekend, with events running over three days in nine venues.

Machynlleth lies on Glyndŵr's Way and the Dyfi Valley Way, two long-distance footpaths.

== MoMA Wales ==
Machynlleth is the home of the Museum of Modern Art (MoMA), Wales. It originated in 1986 as Y Tabernacl, a centre of performing arts in an old chapel, a private initiative by former journalist Andrew Lambert. In 1994 this was expanded with a new complex of art galleries, a recording studio and a language laboratory. Lambert had previously tried to convert the town's old railway station into a hotel and museum, employing international architect Richard Rogers.

MoMA Wales hosts the annual Machynlleth Festival, as well as its own annual open exhibition of art.

== Environment ==
Machynlleth sits at the heart of the Dyfi Biosphere, declared by UNESCO in 2009 as a 'learning place for sustainable development' and it is the home of Ecodyfi, a locally controlled organisation that was set up to foster and support a greener community and economy in the Dyfi Valley.

The Centre for Alternative Technology is based in a disused quarry three miles from Machynlleth.

In December 2019 Machynlleth council was the first in Wales to declare a climate emergency.

== Governance ==
There are two tiers of local government covering Machynlleth:

- Machynlleth Town Council at community (town) level. The town council is based at Y Plas and has twelve councillors. In 2019, the town council became the first in Wales to formally support Welsh independence.
- Powys County Council at county level. The ward elects a county councillor is Alwyn Evans (Plaid Cymru). He was elected in an October 2024 by-election following the death of the previous independent county councillor Michael Williams, who had held the seat since 1980. Alwyn Evans also sits on Machynlleth Town Council.

In the Senedd Welsh Parliament, Machynlleth sits within the Gwynedd Maldwyn constituency electing 6 MS's by proportional representation. At the May 2026 elections these were Siân Gwenllian, Mabon ap Gwynfor, Beca Brown and Elwyn Vaughan of Plaid Cymru, and Andrew Griffin and Claire Johnson-Wood of Reform UK.

Machynlleth is represented in the UK Parliament by Steve Witherden (Labour), MP for Montgomeryshire and Glyndŵr, elected in 2024.

=== Administrative history ===
Machynlleth was an ancient parish in the historic county of Montgomeryshire. When elected parish and district councils were established in 1894, the parish was made an urban district. The Machynlleth Urban District was abolished in 1974, with its area instead becoming a community. District-level functions passed to Montgomery District Council, which in turn was abolished in 1996 and its functions passed to Powys County Council.

== Sport ==
Machynlleth Football Club, founded in 1885, plays in the Central Wales Northern Division. The Machynlleth Rugby Club plays in the North Wales Division 2.

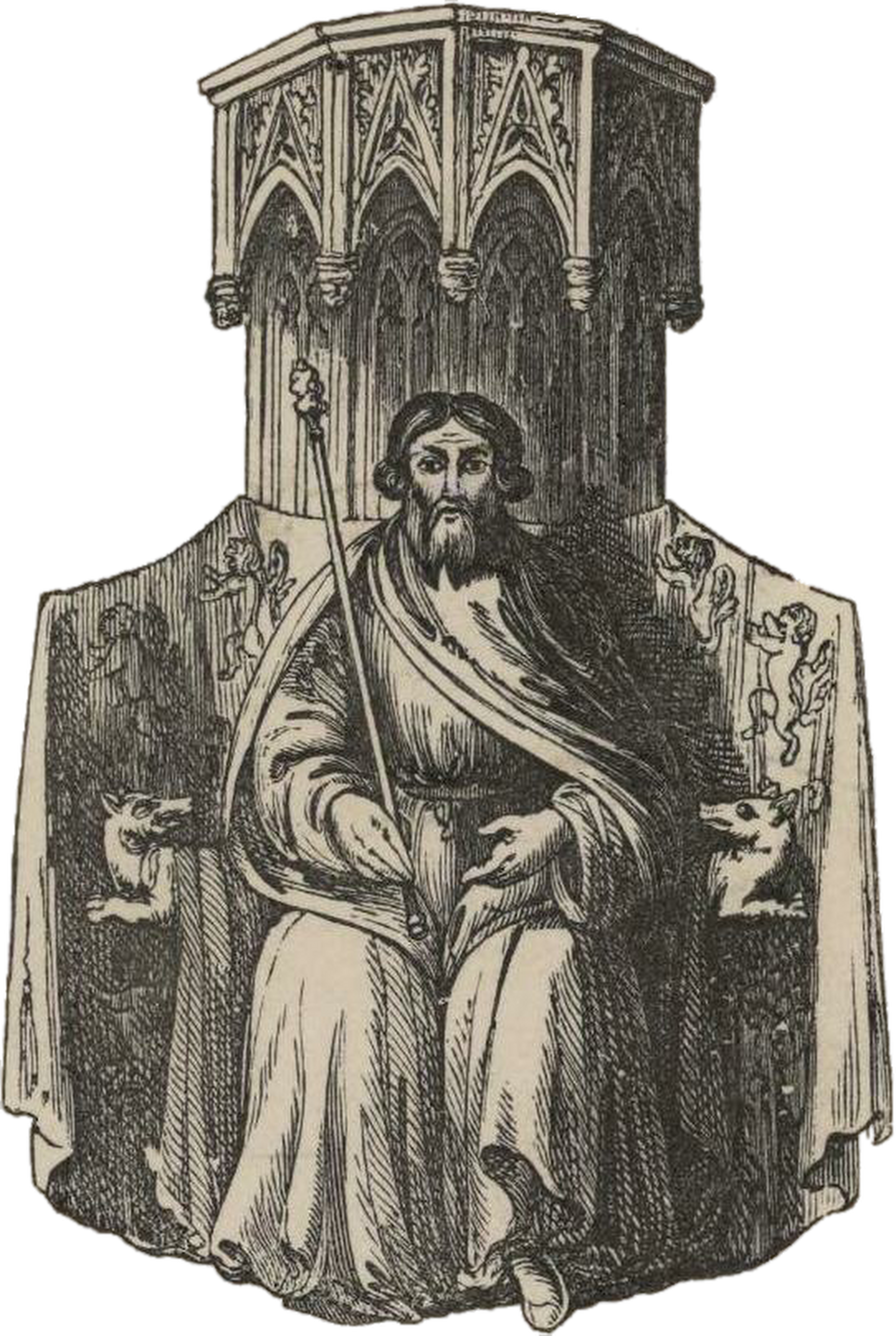
portrait of Owain Glyndŵr

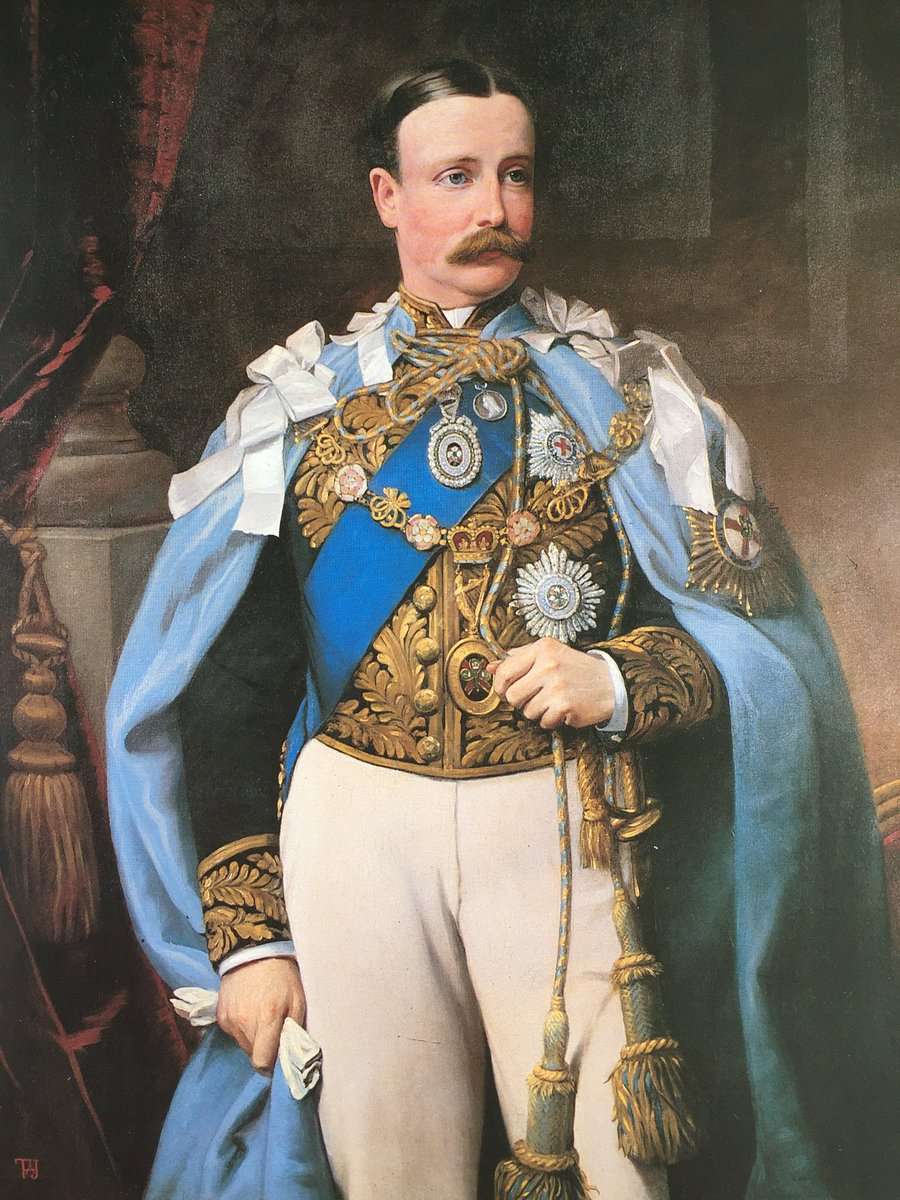
The 6th Marquess of Londonderry, as viceroy of Ireland

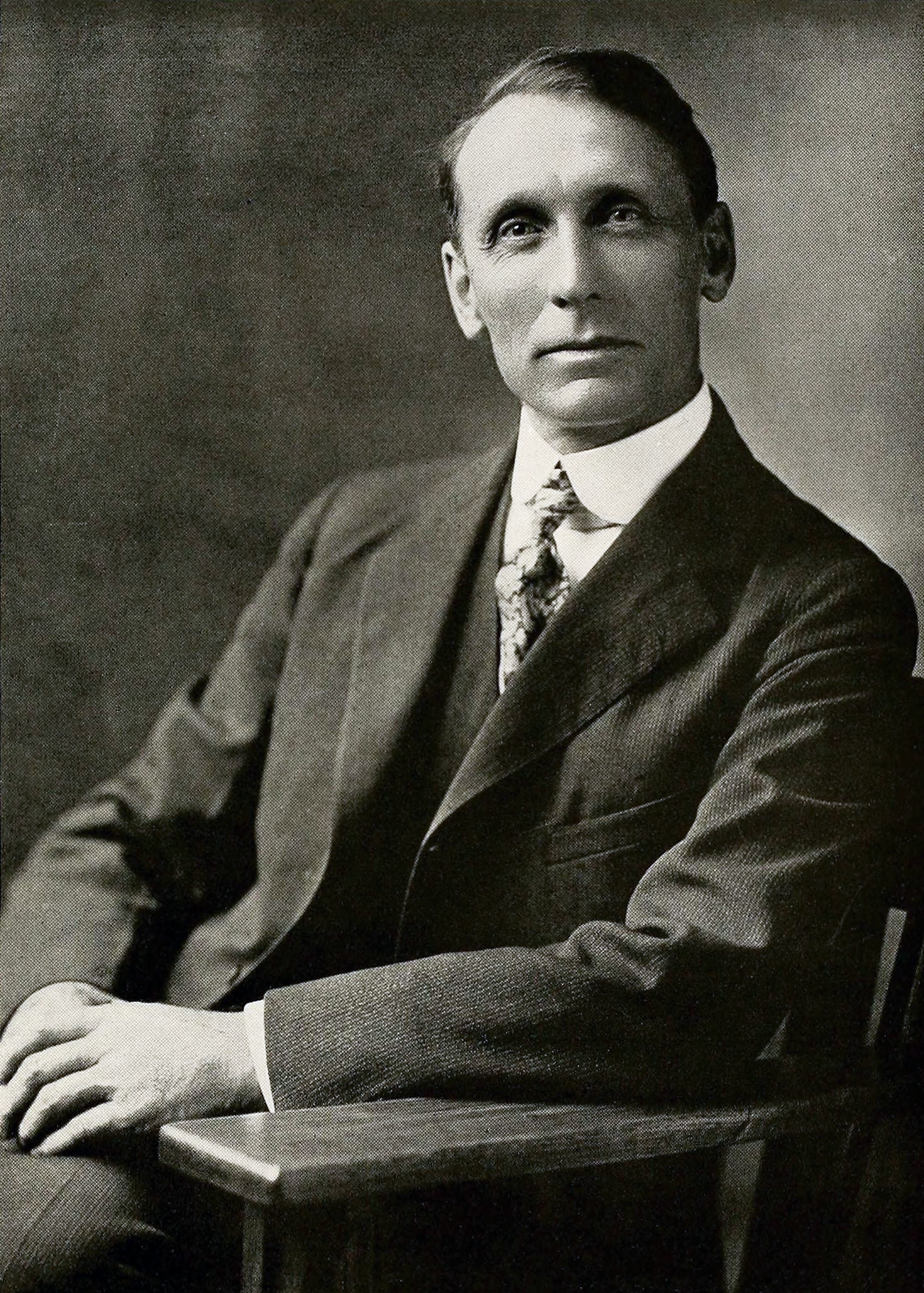
Edward M. Lewis, 1922

== Notable people ==
- Owain Glyndŵr, (c. 1349 or 1359 – c. 1416), Welsh ruler and Prince of Wales, held a parliament in Machynlleth in 1404.
- Hywel Swrdwal, (fl. 1430–1475), Welsh language poet
- David Griffiths, (1792–1863), missionary and Bible translator in Madagascar, lived locally from 1858
- Henry Rogers, (1806–1877), nonconformist minister and man of letters, died locally.
- Thomas Wickham (1810–1890), English cricketer, died locally
- John Evans (1816–1879), miner and political figure in British Columbia, born and educated locally
- George Vane-Tempest, 5th Marquess of Londonderry (1821–1884), aristocrat, businessman, diplomat and politician, lived at Plas Machynlleth
- Charles Vane-Tempest-Stewart, 6th Marquess of Londonderry (1852–1915), politician, landowner and benefactor, lived at Plas Machynlleth
- Lord Herbert Vane-Tempest (1862–1921), director of Cambrian Railways, lived at Plas Machynlleth, died at the Abermule train collision.
- Dick Atkin, Baron Atkin (1867–1944), lawyer and judge, local JP
- Edward M. Lewis, (1872–1936), professor of English literature in the US & baseball player
- Berta Ruck (1878–1978), Welsh writer who grew up nearby.
- Sir Thomas Williams Phillips (1883–1966), senior Civil Servant, educated at Machynlleth County School
- William David Davies, (1897–1969), Presbyterian minister and writer on theology, lived locally
- Sir John Philip Baxter (1905–1989), chemical engineer.
- Syd Thomas (1919–2012) a Welsh professional football winger.
- Laura Ashley (1925–1985), opened her first shop locally at 35 Maengwyn Street in 1961
- Emrys James, (1928–1989), Welsh Shakespearean actor
- Geraint Lloyd Owen (born 1941), Welsh-language poet and teacher, taught locally
- Meri Wells (born 1946), ceramic sculptor, lives and works nearby
- Gareth Glyn, (born 1951), Welsh composer and radio broadcaster
- David Russell Hulme, (born 1951), Welsh conductor and musicologist
- Annie Morgan Suganami (born 1952), Welsh artist and musician, lives and works locally
- Gwynn ap Gwilym, (1955–2016), Welsh language poet, novelist, editor and translator, raised locally
- George Monbiot (born 1963), English writer, lived locally for a number of years
- Led Zeppelin (formed in London in 1968), rock band members Jimmy Page and Robert Plant commenced writing the album Led Zeppelin III at nearby Bron-Yr-Aur cottage
- Nicky Arscott (born 1983), local artist and arts educator
- April Jones (2007–2012), child murder victim

== See also ==
- Mach Loop — military low-level flying training area north of the town, and named after it

Preceding station	Heritage railways	Following station
Terminus	Corris Railway	Ffridd Gate
Preceding station	National Rail	Following station
Caersws	Transport for Wales Cambrian Line	Dovey Junction
