= Listed buildings in Oswestry =

Oswestry is a town and civil parish in Shropshire, England. It contains 140 listed buildings that are recorded in the National Heritage List for England. Of these, one is listed at Grade I, the highest of the three grades, four are at Grade II*, the middle grade, and the others are at Grade II, the lowest grade. The parish contains the town of Oswestry and the immediate surrounding area. The oldest listed building consists of the remains of the castle. The town grew onward from the 12th century, initially in the area around the castle. Further growth occurred during the 18th century as the town stood on the London to Holyhead road, and again following the arrival of the railway in 1848.

The listed buildings largely reflect the history of the town. Most of them are houses, shops, public houses and associated structures, the earliest being timber framed, or with a timber-framed core. The other listed buildings include churches, memorials and other structures in the churchyard, a cross base, a holy well, schools, a boundary stone, a milestone, structures formerly associated with the railway and now used for other purposes, and two war memorials.

== Key ==
Grade	Criteria
I	Buildings of exceptional interest, sometimes considered to be internationally important
II*	Particularly important buildings of more than special interest
II	Buildings of national importance and special interest

== Buildings ==
Name and location	Photograph	Date	Notes	Grade
Oswestry Castle; 52.86120°N 3.05503°W		12th century	The remains of the castle are fragmentary, and are in limestone and conglomerate. The area was landscaped in the 19th century, which included the building of a revetment wall incorporating two re-set town gate piers. These are in sandstone and contain round-headed niches and moulded capping with fluted bands, one with an inscription. The remains and the area of the castle are a Scheduled Monument.	II
St Oswald's Church; 52.8572°N 3.0578°W		Late 12th to early 13th century	The church was repaired after damage in the Civil War, it was restored in 1872–74 by G. E. Street who made additions, and there were further additions in 1886 by A. E. Street. The church is built in sandstone with slate roofs. It consists of a nave, a north aisle, a double south aisle, a south porch, north and south transepts, a chancel, north and south chancel chapels, and a southwest tower. The oldest parts of the church are the bottom three stages of the tower. The tower has angle buttresses, a southwest stair turret, and at the top is a balustrade and crocketed corner pinnacles.	II*
St Oswald's Well; 52.85714°N 3.06488°W		Medieval (probable)	The holy well was restored in 1907, and the surrounding area landscaped in 1985. The well is in sandstone and conglomerate with stepped coping. It has a roughly round arch with voussoirs, it contains a cast iron grill, and above it is an inscribed plaque.	II
Croeswylan Stone; 52.85192°N 3.05943°W	—	14th or 15th century (probable)	The cross base has been moved to a position by a road junction. It is in sandstone and consists of a square stone with chamfered corners and a hollowed centre for a cross shaft.	II
Oswestry Visitor and Exhibition Centre; 52.85689°N 3.05859°W		15th century	The building originated as a school, it was remodelled in the 16th century, and has since been altered and extended and used for other purposes. The original part is timber framed with infill in plaster and red brick, it has been partly refaced and extended in red brick, and it has a slate roof. The building consists of a two-bay hall range with one storey and an attic, a two-storey two-bay cross-wing, and a pair of cottages built in the 19th century in the angle to the right. The gable of the cross-wing, originally jettied, has carved bargeboards and a finial, and a moulded bressumer with underbuilding below. The windows are casements, and there are two slate-hung gabled eaves dormers.	II
Llwyd Mansion; 52.85940°N 3.05494°W		Mid to late 15th century	A house, since much remodelled and altered, and used as shops. It is timber framed with plaster infill and has a tile roof. There are three storeys and an attic, the upper storeys jettied with bressumers. In the ground floor are shop fronts. There are casement windows in the top floor, and elsewhere most windows are mullioned and transomed.	I
The Bell Inn; 52.85674°N 3.05743°W		Late 15th century	A house, later a public house, it was remodelled and later extended. It is timber framed and encased and partly rebuilt in rendered brick. There is a slate roof, two storeys and four bays. In the right part of the ground floor are two doorways and a canted bay window, all under an inn front, to the left is a casement window, and to the left of that a passageway. In the upper floor are sash windows, and in the passageway is exposed timber framing.	II
41 Willow Street; 52.86038°N 3.05740°W	—	Late 15th or 16th century	A house, later a shop, it was remodelled in 1707 and refaced in the 19th century. It is in red brick replacing timber framing, and has a slate roof. There are two storeys with a coped parapet, two bays, and a long rear range. In the ground floor is a shop front, an arched passageway to the left, and in the upper floor are a sash window and a casement window.	II
The Fox Inn; 52.85841°N 3.05609°W		Late 15th or early 16th century	A house, later a public house, it is timber framed, roughcast and rendered and painted to resemble timber framing, and has a slate roof. There are two storeys, and on the front is a projecting jettied gable with a finial. In the ground floor is a horizontally-sliding sash window flanked by doorways with open pediments, and in the upper floor are casement windows.	II
Ye Olde Vaults Inn; 52.85872°N 3.05609°W	—	Late 15th or early 16th century	A house, later a public house, much remodelled, altered and extended, it is timber framed and refronted in rendered brick. It has a moulded eaves cornice, and a slate roof. There are three storeys, three bays, and a gabled rear wing with some exposed timber framing. In the ground floor is a round-headed doorway flanked by elliptical-headed fixed windows, and to the left is a round-arched passageway. The windows in the upper floors are sashes with moulded surrounds, eared architraves, and small keystones.	II
Butcher's Arms and 38 Willow Street; 52.86017°N 3.05681°W		Mid to late 16th century	An inn, later altered into a public house and a shop. Initially it consisted of a front range on the street and a cross-wing on the left, forming an L-shaped plan. The front range is timber framed and partly rendered, and has a slate roof. The cross-wing has been rebuilt in brick and extended at the rear, with applied timber framing, and has a tile roof. There are two storeys, the front range has 2½ bays, and between the public house and the shop is a passageway. Above the shop is a sash window, and elsewhere are casement and fixed windows.	II
13 and 15 Beatrice Street; 52.86085°N 3.05318°W		Late 16th century	A house, at one time an inn and later shops, the building is timber framed with plaster and red brick infill, some applied timber framing, and a slate roof. There is one storey and attics, and the building consists of a long range with three projecting gabled wings. Between the wings are single-storey lean-to additions. In the ground floor are doorways and shop fronts, and above are casement windows and a gabled half-dormer. Inside is exposed timber framing and an inglenook fireplace with a chamfered wooden lintel.	II
40 and 42 Church Street; 52.85661°N 3.05779°W	—	Late 16th century	A house, at one time an inn, and later used for other purposes, it is roughcast over timber framing and has a slate roof. There are two storeys and an H-shaped plan, consisting of a central range and two gabled cross-wings. In front of the central range is a 19th-century lean-to addition, which contains a round-headed doorway, and above is a mullioned and transomed window. In the left wing is a doorway, and windows with Gothic tracery and hood moulds, and in the right wing is a shop front, and above is a window with lattice tracery.	II
56 Willow Street; 52.86050°N 3.05725°W	—	Late 16th century	A house later used for other purposes, it is timber framed with plaster and red brick infill, rendered at the front, and with a slate roof. There are two storeys and an L-shaped plan, with a two or three-bay front, a long four-bay rear range, and a staircase projection in the angle. On the front are two three-light horizontally-sliding sash windows in the upper floor, and a casement window and a modern shop front in the ground floor.	II
57 and 59 Church Street; 52.85686°N 3.05732°W	—	c. 1600	A house, later two shops, extensively remodelled in the early 19th century. It is timber framed and encased in red brick, and has a dentilled eaves cornice and a slate roof. There are two storeys and two bays. In the ground floor are 19th-century shop fronts, and to the left is a passageway. The upper floor contains a casement window on the left and a sash window on the right.	II
32–36 Willow Street; 52.86008°N 3.05673°W	—	16th or 17th century	A house, later offices, in brick on a timber framed core, and with a slate roof. There are two storeys, four bays, and a short gabled rear wing. In the ground floor are six 19th-century fluted pilasters with 20th-century inserted fixed windows. The upper floor contains casement windows.	II
Kings Head Inn; 52.85878°N 3.05602°W	—	16th or 17th century	A house, later a public house, it is timber framed and was refronted in the 19th century in red brick. It has a slate roof, three storeys, three bays, and a low range at the rear with red brick infill. In the ground floor is a 19th-century inn front, including an entablature on consoles, and there is a doorway with a fanlight on the left. The upper floors contain a mix of sash and casement windows.	II
29 Bailey Street; 52.86016°N 3.05488°W	—	Early 17th century	A house, later used for other purposes, it is timber framed with plaster infill and a slate roof. There are two storeys and an attic, and three gables on the front with fretwork bargeboards and finials, the left gable projecting over a passageway. At the rear is a two-storey extension, and in the ground floor are 20th-century shop fronts. The windows include horizontally-sliding sashes, and some windows have pointed heads with Gothic glazing.	II*
2 Lower Brook Street; 52.85632°N 3.05766°W		Early 17th century	A cottage, later extended, it is timber framed with plaster infill on a brick plinth with a slate roof. There is one storey and an attic, three bays, a brick lean-to, and gabled rear extensions. The windows are cast iron latticed casements with moulded surrounds, and there are two gabled dormers.	II
7 Salop Road; 52.85893°N 3.05315°W		Early 17th century	A house, later altered and extended and used for other purposes, it is timber framed with plaster infill and a slate roof, and the left gable end has been clad in brick. There are two storeys, three bays, and three brick gabled wings at the rear incorporating a timber framed lean-to. In the centre is a two-storey jettied porch containing benches and moulded bressumers. It is gabled, with fretted bargeboards and a finial. In the upper floor of the porch is a Venetian window, and the other windows are 20th-century casements. Inside is exposed wattle and daub infill.	II
White Lion Inn; 52.86256°N 3.06029°W		Early 17th century	A house, later a public house, it is in rendered brick encasing timber framing, and has a slate roof. There is one storey and an attic, and the building consists of a range of 2½ bays, a gabled cross-wing to the left, and a two-bay range at right angles to the rear on the right. In the main range are two fixed windows and a gabled porch, above are two flat-roofed eaves dormers, and the other windows are casements.	II
Lych gate 52.85678°N 3.05849°W	—	1631	The lych gate, originally the entrance to the grammar school, is timber framed on 18th-century walls, and has a stone-slate roof with four gables and finials. To the south is a low stone wall with cast iron railings.	II
11 and 13 Albion Hill; 52.86058°N 3.05388°W	—	17th century	A house, later two shops, it is timber framed and refronted in rendered brick, with a modillion eaves cornice and a slate roof. There are two storeys and an attic, four bays, and a lower gabled wing at the rear. In the ground floor are a 19th-century and a 20th-century shop front, the upper floor contains sash windows with plain lintels and projecting keystones, and there are three gabled dormers. Between the central windows is a cartouche.	II
1 and 3 Church Street; 52.85889°N 3.05555°W	—	17th century	A house, later a shop, it was remodelled in 1707 and later extended and altered. The building is in rendered timber framing and brick, and has a slate roof. There are two storeys, and it consists of a hall and a cross-wing with the gable facing the street, and a 19th-century projection with a dentil eaves cornice. The windows are casements, and there are shop fronts in the gable end and in the 19th-century projection. To the right is a passageway.	II
18 and 20 Cross Street; 52.85964°N 3.05400°W	—	17th century (probable)	A house, later two shops, that were refaced and extended in the 19th century, probably on a timber framed core. They have two storeys and four bays. In the ground floor are 20th-century shop fronts and a segmental-headed passageway to the right, and in the upper floors are sash windows in moulded surrounds.	II
2 and 4 Leighton Place; 52.85605°N 3.05650°W	—	17th century	A house at right angles to the street, later extended, divided, and used partly as a shop. It is in brick and stone, probably on a timber framed core, with a slate roof. It has two storeys and an attic and three bays. The windows are casements, there are two gabled dormers, and in the side facing the street is a shop front. Inside is a timber framed partition, and a partly infilled inglenook fireplace.	II
Griffin Inn; 52.86047°N 3.05418°W		17th century	A house, later a public house, it is timber framed and was refronted in the 18th century. The front is in roughcast brick and painted stone, with quoins, a moulded sill band, a moulded eaves cornice and a slate roof. There are two storeys, three bays, and a rear wing on the left. Most of the windows are sashes, and they have moulded surrounds and projecting moulded keystones.	II
The Hayes; 52.86493°N 3.06976°W	—	Mid 17th century	A hunting lodge, later a private house, it is in sandstone on a chamfered plinth, with a moulded eaves cornice and a slate roof. There are two storeys, attics and cellars, and a cruciform plan, each range gabled and with a ball finial. The main doorway is approached by five steps, it has a four-centred arch, decorative spandrels, and a moulded hood mould. The windows are either mullioned and transomed or cross-windows, and on the east front is a two-storey canted bay window.	II*
32 Upper Brook Street; 52.85647°N 3.05947°W	—	1724	A house in reddish-brown brick with a floor band and a slate roof. There are two storeys, three bays, and a rear lean-to range. The central doorway has a rectangular fanlight and a segmental head. The windows are 20th-century casements, those in the ground floor with segmental heads, and there is a datestone in the right gable end.	II
26 and 28 Upper Brook Street; 52.85647°N 3.05920°W	—	Early 18th century	A pair of red brick houses with slate hanging on the right return, bands, pilasters on the left corner and between the houses, a moulded eaves cornice, and a double-span slate roof. There are three storeys, No. 26 has four bays and No. 28 has three. The doorways have moulded hoods on modillion brackets, and to the right of each doorway is a canted bay window. The other windows are sashes with segmental heads.	II
George Hotel, 3 Bailey Head and stable block 52.86053°N 3.05465°W		Early 18th century	The hotel is in red brick with rusticated quoins, a modillion eaves cornice on the front, a moulded eaves cornice on the side, and a tile roof. There are two storeys and attics, and seven bays on the front. In the ground floor is a 19th-century inn front with a moulded entablature on decorated console brackets. In the upper floor are sash windows with projecting moulded keystones, and there is a gabled eaves dormer. Attached to the right return is a shop with three bays and dormers, and at an oblique angle is the former stable block with two storeys.	II
Gate piers and gates, St Oswald's Church; 52.85741°N 3.05726°W	—	c. 1738	At the northeast corner of the churchyard are three gate piers, two flanking the entrance to Broad Walk, and the other at right angles. They have a square section, and each pier has three moulded rectangular bands, a moulded plinth, and capping surmounted by an ornamental urn. Between them are delicate and decorative wrought iron gates. Extending to the south is a 19th-century wall with stone coping containing a pair of piers with blind Gothic tracery.	II
12 and 14 Lower Brook Street; 52.85603°N 3.05637°W	—	1741	A pair of red brick houses with a slate roof, two storeys and an attic, and four bays. On the front is a datestone, the windows are sashes, there are two gabled dormers, and the entrances are at the rear.	II
12 and 14 Beatrice Street; 52.86060°N 3.05335°W	—	1744	A house, later two shops, in painted brick with a slate roof, two storeys, and four bays. In the ground floor are shop fronts, above are sash windows, and between the middle windows is a dated cartouche.	II
Group of seven chest tombs 52.85730°N 3.05830°W	—	c. 1748 and later	The tombs are in the churchyard of St Oswald's Church. They are all in sandstone, they are rectangular, and have moulded plinths and capping. Two have corner balusters, and the others are plainer. The latest tombs are dated 1803 and 1827.	II
6 Upper Brook Street; 52.85618°N 3.05713°W	—	1749	A red brick house on a stone plinth, with chamfered quoins, a moulded eaves cornice, and a slate roof with coped verges. There are two storeys and an attic, and three bays. The central doorway has a moulded hood on modillion brackets. The windows are sashes with plain lintels and projecting moulded keystones, and in the left gable end is a datestone.	II
34 Church Street; 52.85812°N 3.05674°W	—	18th century	The house, remodelled in the 19th century, is in red brick with a slate roof, hipped to the left. There are three storeys, three bays, and a lower range at the rear on the left. Steps lead up to a central doorway that has a stuccoed porch flanked by rounded piers, and surmounted by a balustrade. The windows are sashes.	II
39 and 41 Church Street; 52.85758°N 3.05680°W	—	Mid 18th century	A pair of houses later used for other purposes, possibly incorporating earlier material. They are in brick, stuccoed on the front, with a sill band, a modillion eaves cornice, and a slate roof with coped verges. There are two storeys and an attic, eight bays, and a two-storey rear range. The building contains two pedimented doorways, sash windows, and four dormers with hipped roofs.	II
63 Church Street; 52.85668°N 3.05747°W	—	Mid 18th century	A house, later a shop, it is in stuccoed red brick with a slate roof. There are two storeys and an attic, two bays, and a gabled rear wing. In the ground floor is a late 20th-century shop front, the upper floor contains sash windows, and there are two hip roofed eaves dormers.	II
43 and 45 Willow Street; 52.86044°N 3.05749°W	—	Mid 18th century	The remodelling of an earlier house, later used for other purposes. It is in red brick and has a dentilled eaves cornice and a slate roof. There are two storeys and an attic, three bays, and a lower rear range in stone and brick, possibly with a timber framed core. In the ground floor are 19th-century shop fronts, the middle floor contains segmental-headed casement windows, and there are three gabled eaves dormers.	II
57 Willow Street; 52.86081°N 3.05793°W	—	Mid 18th century (probable)	A house in reddish-brown brick with a stepped eaves cornice and a slate roof. There are two storeys and an attic, and three bays. The central doorway has a rectangular fanlight and a wooden hood on brackets. The windows are segmental-headed latticed casements with hood moulds, the window above the doorway being blind, and there are two gabled eaves dormers.	II
13 York Street; 52.86250°N 3.05970°W	—	Mid 18th century	A red brick house with a moulded eaves cornice and a slate roof. There are three storeys and three bays, the middle bay projecting slightly and pedimented. The central doorway has a rectangular fanlight and an open pediment. The top window in the middle bay is a casement with a round head, and the other windows are sashes with flat heads.	II
Sundial; 52.85680°N 3.05844°W	—	Mid to late 18th century	The sundial is in the churchyard of St Oswald's Church. It is in sandstone, and consists of a baluster with a moulded plinth and capping, and it stands on a base of three circular steps.	II
11 Arthur Street; 52.86062°N 3.05616°W	—	Late 18th century	A red brick house, later offices, it has a slate roof and a gabled front. There are three storeys and two bays. The doorway on the left has a rectangular fanlight and a bracketed hood, and the windows are sashes.	II
13 Arthur Street; 52.86065°N 3.05607°W	—	Late 18th century	A house, later offices, in red brick with a pyramidal slate roof. There are three storeys and three bays. The doorway in the right bay has a rectangular fanlight, the windows are sashes, and in the left return are blind windows. All the openings have segmental heads.	II
36 Bailey Street; 52.86034°N 3.05452°W	—	Late 18th century	A shop in rendered brick, with a moulded eaves cornice and a slate roof. There are two stroreys and four bays, and it contains a late 20th-century shop front and sash windows.	II
35 Church Street; 52.85789°N 3.05656°W	—	Late 18th century	A house, later a shop, in red brick with a moulded eaves cornice, and a hipped slate roof. There are three storeys and five bays. Four circular steps lead up to a central doorway with fluted pilasters, a fanlight, and an open pediment, and this is flanked by late 19th-century shop fronts. Above the doorway is a Venetian window, and the other windows are sashes.	II
Gate pier, 36 Church Street; 52.85767°N 3.05708°W	—	Late 18th century	The gate pier is attached to the southeast corner of the house. It is in sandstone and has a rectangular section. On the front is a fluted band with a moulded oval disc above, and at the top is moulded capping surmounted by a decorative urn with grotesque faces.	II
Gate pier, 40 Church Street; 52.85765°N 3.05712°W	—	Late 18th century	The gate pier is attached to the northeast corner of the house. It is in sandstone and has a rectangular section. On the front is a fluted band with a moulded oval disc above, and at the top is moulded capping surmounted by a decorative urn with grotesque faces.	II
26 and 28 Cross Street; 52.85966°N 3.05399°W	—	Late 18th century	A public house and a shop in painted and rendered brick with a slate roof. There are two storeys and an attic, and three bays. No. 26 has a late 20th-century shop front, and in the ground floor of No. 28 is a 19th-century shop front with a triple-round-arched fixed-light window flanked by doorways with pilasters and rectangular fanlights. In the upper floor are sash windows, and there are three hip roofed dormers.	II
Former doctor's premises Lower Brook Street; 52.85615°N 3.05699°W	—	Late 18th century	A sandstone house on a chamfered plinth, with bands, a moulded eaves parapet, and a hipped slate roof. There are two storeys and two bays. The doorway in the right bay has a rectangular fanlight and a moulded wooden hood on modillion brackets, and the windows are sashes.	II
Row of bollards, 6 Lower Brook Street; 52.85623°N 3.05712°W	—	Late 18th century (probable)	Along the front of the house is a row of seven bollards. They are in stone, and are hexagonal with moulded tops. The bollards are linked by an iron chain.	II
8 Lower Brook Street; 52.85611°N 3.05669°W	—	Late 18th century	A red brick house with a sandstone front, a coved eaves parapet, and a slate roof. There are three storeys, two bays, and a rear brick range. The doorway has a rectangular fanlight and a pedimented hood on brackets, and the windows are sashes.	II
9 and 11 Willow Street; 52.85939°N 3.05628°W		Late 18th century	A house, later a shop (now Betfred), possibly including earlier material. It is in rendered brick with a moulded eaves cornice and a slate roof. There are three storeys, two bays, and a gabled rear wing. In the ground floor is a 20th-century shop front, and in the upper floors are sash windows.	II
18 and 20 Willow Street; 52.85979°N 3.05634°W		Late 18th century	A remodelling of an earlier, possibly timber framed building, in brick, partly rendered, and with a slate roof. There are two storeys and three bays, and No. 20 has a dentilled eaves cornice. In the ground floor are modern shop fronts, the upper floor contains sash windows with segmental heads, and there are two hip roofed dormers.	II
Lys House; 52.85723°N 3.03647°W	—	Late 18th century	A farmhouse, later divided into flats, it is in red brick with a dentil eaves cornice, and a hipped slate roof. There are three storeys, three bays, flanking pavilion-like wings each with a central pediment, and a rear lean-to. The doorway has a rectangular four-light fanlight and a pediment, and the windows are casements.	II
Gate piers, St Oswald's Church; 52.85669°N 3.05776°W	—	Late 18th century (probable)	The gate piers are at the entrance to the churchyard. They have a square section and are in rusticated sandstone. The gate piers have moulded plinths and capping, and are surmounted by lamps. Between them are wrought iron gates.	II
The Bailey Head; 52.86071°N 3.05431°W		Late 18th century	A house, later a public house, it was refronted in the mid-19th century. It is in stuccoed and rendered brick with angle quoins, bands, a moulded eaves cornice, and a slate roof. There are three storeys and four bays. The doorway has a rectangular fanlight and a bracketed hood, and the windows are sashes in moulded surrounds. In the ground floor the windows have segmental heads, and in the middle floor they have projecting keystones.	II
Wynnstay Hotel; 52.85724°N 3.05697°W		Late 18th century	A house, later a hotel, it is in red brick with a moulded eaves cornice on the front and dentil eaves cornices on the sides, and a hipped slate roof. There are three storeys and six bays, and a two-storey two-bay extension on the left. Projecting from the front is a Roman Doric portico with paired unfluted columns and an entablature, and above the door is a rectangular fanlight. The windows are sashes, and at the rear is an angled bay window and a Venetian window.	II
Headmaster's House, Oswestry School; 52.85599°N 3.06333°W	—	c. 1776	The house is in red brick with a moulded eaves cornice, and a double-span slate roof with stone coping. There are two storeys, an attic and a basement, and a front of four bays. At the rear are five bays, the middle three bays pedimented. In the centre of the front is a Roman Doric porch in Grinshill sandstone, with two pairs of coupled columns and a moulded entablature, and the windows are sashes.	II
Bellan School and railings 52.85760°N 3.05723°W	—	1776–79	A house, later used as a school, it is in red brick on a rendered stone plinth, with bands, a moulded eaves cornice, a parapet, and a slate roof. There are three storeys and a basement, seven bays, and two service ranges at the rear. On the front are three-bay two-storey canted bay windows in the outer bays. Steps lead up to a central tripartite doorway with an Ionic porch. The windows are sashes, the window above the porch has a segmental pediment, and the window in the top floor has a moulded surround. In front of the building are iron railings on a low stone wall.	II
Bennion/Lewis memorial 52.85701°N 3.05757°W	—	c. 1777	The memorial is in the churchyard of St Oswald's Church, and is to the memory of John Lewis and Thomas Bennion. It is a chest tomb in sandstone, and has a rectangular plan, a moulded plinth, and capping with square corner balusters.	II
9 and 11 Church Street; 52.85861°N 3.05579°W	—	c. 1800	A pair of red brick shops with a moulded stone eaves parapet and a slate roof. There are three storeys and three bays. In the ground floor are 20th-century shop fronts and a round-arched passageway to the right, and in the upper floors are sash windows and blind windows in the middle bay.	II
45 Church Street; 52.85710°N 3.05714°W	—	c. 1800	A house, later a shop, in red brick with a moulded eaves cornice and a slate roof. There are three storeys and three bays. In the ground floor are a 19th-century shop front and a flat-arched passageway to the right. In the upper floors are sash windows, and there is a wrought iron ornamental scrolled bracket.	II
21 and 23 Leg Street; 52.85970°N 3.05355°W	—	c. 1800	A house, later two shops, refronting an earlier building. It is in stuccoed brick with a mouklded eaves parapet and a slate roof. There are three storeys, each shop has one bay, and at the rear is a part-rendered brick range. In the ground floor are shop fronts, and the upper floors contain sash windows with moulded surrounds.	II
49 and 51 Roft Street; 52.85658°N 3.05538°W	—	c. 1800	A house, later divided into two, in red brick, with a left return in limestone and some slate hanging on the right return, on a plinth of brick and stone, with a dentil eaves cornice, and a hipped slate roof. There are three storeys, three bays, and a lean-to on the left. The doorway has fluted pilasters, a rectangular fanlight with nail ornamentation below, and an open pediment. The windows are sashes with stone lintels and projecting keystones.	II
24–30 Salop Road; 52.85821°N 3.05195°W	—	c. 1800	A terrace of three houses and a shop on the left, in red brick, with a dentilled eaves cornice and a slate roof. There are three storeys and seven bays. In the ground floor are three doorways, two paired in the centre, and one at the right. They have moulded surrounds, traceried rectangular fanlights, moulded entablatures on carved console brackets. On the left is a 20th-century shop front, and there are two round-arched passageways. The windows are sashes, some painted in imitation.	II
8 and 10 Upper Brook Street; 52.85645°N 3.05827°W	—	c. 1800	A pair of red brick houses with a dentilled eaves cornice and a slate roof. There are two storeys and attics, each house has two bays, and a central doorway with a plain surround. Above the left doorway is a moulded hood on modillion brackets. The windows are sashes with segmental heads, and there are two hip roofed dormers on the left, and two flat-roofed dormers on the right.	II
27 Cross Street; 52.85993°N 3.05396°W	—	Late 18th or early 19th century	A house, later a shop, possibly incorporating part of an earlier building. It is in stuccoed red brick with a moulded eaves cornice, and a pyramidal tile roof. There are three storeys, three bays, and a rear range. The front is flanked by banded corner pilasters with initials in panels at the top. In the ground floor is a shop front, and above are sash windows, those in the middle floor in architraves with projecting keystones, and in the top floor the right window is blind.	II
Boundary stone 52.86546°N 3.06838°W		Late 18th or early 19th century	The stone is set into a wall, and marks the boundary between the parishes of Oswestry and Selattyn. It is in limestone, it is rectangular with a rounded top, and is inscribed with initials representing the parishes.	II
64–70 Willow Street; 52.86083°N 3.05764°W	—	1804	A terrace of four red brick houses, No. 64 stuccoed, with a sill band, a moulded eaves cornice and a slate roof. There are three storeys and eight bays, the alternate bays wider, some of the narrow bays containing blind recesses. In the outer bays are doorways with pilasters with fanlights. In the centre is a wider doorway that has fluted pilasters with moulded caps and a segmental arch. Also in the round floor are two narrow round-headed passageway. The windows are sashes in recesses; in the ground and middle floors they have segmental heads and in the top floor the heads are flat.	II
Wolfe/Jennings memorial 52.85738°N 3.05756°W	—	c. 1805	The memorial is in the churchyard of St Oswald's Church and is to the memory of members of the Wolfe and Jennings families. It is a rectangular chest tomb in sandstone, and has tapering sides, and a moulded plinth and capping.	II
Pair of Jones Memorials; 52.85748°N 3.05845°W	—	c. 1815	The memorials are in the churchyard of St Oswald's Church and are to the memory of members of the Jones family. They are in sandstone and consist of a pair of square pedestal tombs. The tombs taper outwards, they have wide overhanging pediments on each side, and are dated between 1802 and 1854.	II
Former malthouse 52.86115°N 3.05855°W	—	1819	Originally a theatre, later a malthouse, now disused, it is in red brick with some limestone and a slate roof. There are three storeys and a gable end facing the street. The gable end has three bays, the middle bay projecting slightly, and a stone band with dentils. It contains two doorways, segmental-headed windows, and in the gable is an infilled roundel. Along the sides are dentilled eaves cornices, segmental-headed windows, and a hoist with a canopy, and at the rear is a two-storey gabled range.	II
Williams memorial 52.85742°N 3.05854°W	—	c. 1820	The memorial is in the churchyard of St Oswald's Church and is to the memory of Catherine Williams. It is a rectangular chest tomb in sandstone, and has a moulded plinth, a chamfered top ledger, plain corner pilasters, and a recessed semi-circular inscription panel.	II
Oerley Hall; 52.86042°N 3.09240°W	—	c. 1820–30	A roughcast farmhouse with a dentil eaves cornice, and hipped slate roof. There are three storeys and three bays, and a later single-storey extension to the right with a pyramidal roof. In the centre is a Doric portico with a moulded entablature containing triglyphs and metopes. The windows are sashes, and in the extension is a canted bay window.	II
Former stable block, Oerley Hall; 52.86048°N 3.09278°W	—	c. 1820–30	The former stable block is in limestone with red brick dressings, a dentil eaves cornice, and a slate roof, hipped at the corners. There is a roughly U-shaped plan, mainly with one storey, and with two storeys in the corner projections. It contains a mix of sash and casement windows, doorways, and a wide vehicle arch, all with segmental heads.	II
8 Leighton Place; 52.85565°N 3.05672°W	—	1825	A limestone house with a slate roof, two storeys and two bays. The central doorway has a pediment, and above it is a datestone. The ground floor windows are sashes, and the upper floor windows have been converted into top-hung casements.	II
3 and 5 Albion Hill; 52.86057°N 3.05419°W	—	Early 19th century	A house, later a shop, in red brick with a dentil eaves cornice and a slate roof. There are three storeys and an attic, and two bays. In the ground floor is a 20th-century shop front, and the windows are sashes.	II
23 and 25 Bailey Street and passageway 52.85977°N 3.05507°W	—	Early 19th century	A pair of houses, later shops, in red brick with a parapet, a moulded eaves cornice with triglyphs, and a slate roof. There are three storeys and two bays. No. 23 has a 19th-century shop front with a moulded entablature on elaborate gilded console brackets, and No. 25 has a late 20th-century shop front. The windows are sashes with cornices, fluted in the middle floor, with rosettes and paterae. To the left is a round-arched passageway.	II
31 Bailey Street; 52.86026°N 3.05476°W	—	Early 19th century	A house, later a shop, it is in stuccoed red brick with an eaves cornice and a slate roof. In the centre is a pediment and on the corners are miniature bracketed segmental pediments. There are three storeys and three bays. In the ground floor is a segmental-headed 20th-century shop front with two recessed doorways, and above are sash windows.	II
39 and 41 Bailey Street; 52.86044°N 3.05471°W	—	Early 19th century	A house, later a pair of shops, in red brick with a slate roof. There are three storeys, three bays, and a gabled rear wing. In the ground floor are 20th-century shop fronts that have doorways with rectangular fanlights, and in the upper floors are sash windows.	II
16–20 Church Street and warehouse 52.85863°N 3.05619°W	—	Early 19th century	A row of three brick shops, No. 16 painted, and No. 18 roughcast. They have a moulded eaves cornice, a coped parapet, and a slate roof. There are three storeys, No. 16 has one bay, No. 18 has two, and No. 20 has three. In the ground floor are 20th-century shop fronts, and in the upper floors are sash windows, the window in the middle floor of No. 16 having a tripartite window and a lintel with triglyphs and metopes. At the rear is an L-shaped warehouse with two storeys, round-headed cast iron windows, and a pyramidal roof.	II
25 and 27 Church Street; 52.85829°N 3.05625°W	—	Early 19th century	A pair of red brick shops that have a moulded eaves cornice with fluted decoration and a slate roof. There is one casement window, the other windows are sash windows, and in the ground floor are two 20th-century shop fronts. Between these is a re-sited gate pier in stone, with a fluted band and an inscription at the top, under which is a coat of arms, a round-headed niche, and a metal plaque depicting Hercules.	II
29 and 31 Church Street; 52.85821°N 3.05629°W	—	Early 19th century	A pair of red brick shops with a boarded eaves cornice and a hipped slate roof. There are three storeys, and each shop has one bay. In the ground floor is a 20th-century shop front at the left, and on the right is a 19th-century shop front with a moulded entablature on elaborately carved consoles. In the upper floors are sash windows, those in the middle floor having cornices with paterae.	II
36 Church Street, piers and railings 52.85774°N 3.05709°W	—	Early 19th century	A red brick house with a hipped slate roof, three storeys and three bays. Steps lead up to a central porch surmounted by a balustrade, and the windows are sashes. In front of the forecourt are iron railings and piers flanking the porch and at the ends.	II
2 Coney Green; 52.85935°N 3.05282°W	—	Early 19th century	A red brick house with a dentilled eaves cornice and a slate roof. There are three storeys and three bays. The central doorway has pilasters and a pedimented hood on brackets, and the windows are sashes.	II
6 Cross Street; 52.85930°N 3.05472°W	—	Early 19th century	A house, later a shop, it is in stuccoed brick with wide eaves and a slate roof. There are three storeys and two bays. In the ground floor is a 20th-century shop front incorporating 19th-century fluted pilasters, and above the door is a rectangular fanlight. The upper floors contain sash windows, those in the middle floor having moulded architraves, projecting keystones, and segmental heads.	II
1–9 Leg Street; 52.86043°N 3.05375°W	—	Early 19th century	A terrace of six houses, later shops, along a curved street. They are in rendered brick with a moulded eaves cornice, a coped parapet, and a slate roof. There are three storeys, and each shop has one bay, with paired pilasters dividing the bays. In the ground floor are shop fronts, a round-arched passageway on the left, and in the upper floors are sash windows.	II
2 Upper Brook Street; 52.85641°N 3.05793°W	—	Early 19th century	A house, later a shop, in red brick with a dentil eaves cornice and a tile roof. It has three storeys and two bays. In the ground floor is a Tuscan doorway with rectangular fanlight and a shop window to the right, and in the upper floors are sash windows.	II
3 Upper Brook Street; 52.85672°N 3.05888°W	—	Early 19th century	A red brick house on a sandstone plinth, with a moulded eaves cornice, and a hipped slate roof. There are two storeys and three bays. The central doorway has a moulded surround, fluted convex pilasters, a traceried rectangular fanlight, and a bracketed hood. The windows are sashes with projecting keystones.	II
16–22 Upper Brook Street; 52.85645°N 3.05867°W		Early 19th century	A terrace of four red brick houses with a moulded eaves cornice and a slate roof. There are three storeys and seven bays. In the ground floor are two pairs of doorways with pilasters, each pair sharing a pediment, a central roond-arched passageway, a bay window, and three sash windows. In the upper floors are more sash windows, those in the middle and ground floor have segmental heads and stuccoed fan-like decoration in the tympana.	II
2 Upper Church Street; 52.85681°N 3.05787°W	—	Early 19th century	A house, later a shop on a corner site, it is in brick with a dentilled eaves cornice and a slate roof. There are three storeys, three bays on the east front, an angled bay on the corner, and one bay on the north front. On the ground floor is a 20th-century shop front that has retained 19th-century wooden pilasters. The upper floors contain sash windows and some blind windows.	II
4–14 Upper Church Street; 52.85617°N 3.05795°W	—	Early 19th century	A terrace of six red brick houses with a moulded eaves cornice and a slate roof. There are three storeys and six bays. Five of the houses have doorways with pediments, and one has a shop front. There is a passageway with timber framed panels. Most of the windows are casements, and there are four sash windows, one of them horizontally-sliding.	II
48 and 50 Upper Church Street; 52.85550°N 3.05826°W	—	Early 19th century	A pair of red brick houses with a dentilled eaves cornice and a slate roof. There are three storeys and three bays. The doorway of No. 48 has a plain surround, the doorway of No. 50 has a semicircular fanlight and a pedimented hood, and to its left is a round-arched passageway. The windows are sashes.	II
52 Upper Church Street; 52.85541°N 3.05838°W	—	Early 19th century	A red brick house with a slate roof, three storeys and two bays. There are two doorways with fanlights and pediments, the door on the right being more elaborate. The windows in the top floor are casements, and the others are sashes, those in the left bay are tripartite with segmental heads.	II
2 and 4 Willow Street; 52.85930°N 3.05593°W	—	Early 19th century	A house, later a shop, in stuccoed and rendered brick, with a moulded eaves cornice and a slate roof. There are three storeys and three bays following the curve of the street, the bays divided by pilasters. In the ground floor is a 20th-century shop front. The windows are sashes, the central window in the middle floor having a round head.	II
33–39 Willow Street; 52.86027°N 3.05724°W	—	Early 19th century	A row of shops and offices in red brick with a moulded eaves cornice, sill bands, and a slate roof. There are three storeys and eight bays, the third and fourth bays taller, projecting, and with a hipped roof. Most of the windows are sashes, those in the middle floor of the first two bays in recessed arches. The first two bays contain modern shop fronts, and in the right four bays is an elliptical arch flanked by round arches with impost bands.	II
53 and 55 Willow Street; 52.86072°N 3.05784°W	—	Early 19th century	A pair of red brick houses with a slate roof. There are three storeys, two bays, and a hip roofed extension at the rear. The windows are sashes.	II
58 and 60 Willow Street; 52.86058°N 3.05733°W	—	Early 19th century	A pair of red brick houses with a dentilled eaves cornice and a slate roof. There are three storeys, two bays, and a rear wing. The doorways have pilasters and rectangular fanlights, and No. 60 also has a pilastered shop front. The windows are sashes with segmental heads.	II
59 Willow Street; 52.86081°N 3.05794°W	—	Early 19th century	A house, at one time a shop, it is in painted brick with a slate roof. There are three storeys and two bays. In the centre is a doorway, there are sash windows in the two lower floors and casement windows in the top floor.	II
61–65 Willow Street; 52.86094°N 3.05813°W	—	Early 19th century	A row of three red brick houses on a plinth, with a slate roof. There are three storeys and four bays. The doorways of Nos. 63 and 65 have pilasters and rectangular fanlights, the doorway of No. 61 also has a pediment, and to its left is a 19th-century shop window. The other windows are sashes.	II
Oak Inn; 52.85703°N 3.05721°W		Early 19th century	A house, later a public house, it is in brick with a dentilled eaves cornice, a slate roof, and there are two storeys. In the centre is a bow window and to the right is a doorway with a rectangular fanlight, all under a moulded surround with rose emblems on decorated scroll brackets. To the left is a passageway door, and in the upper floor are horizontally-sliding sash windows.	II
Savings Bank; 52.86075°N 3.05515°W	—	Early 19th century	A house, later used for other purposes, it is in red brick on a stone plinth and has a hipped slate roof. There are two storeys and a basement storey at the rear, a front of four bays, the right bay slightly recessed, and a single-bay extension recessed on the left. On the front is a gabled porch with an arched recess, the windows are sashes, and in the extension they have narrow round-arched heads.	II
The Don; 52.86060°N 3.05433°W	—	Early 19th century	A house, later a shop, on a corner site, in red brick with a coved eaves parapet and a slate roof. There are four storeys and fronts of three and two bays. The windows are sashes.	II
The Poplars and garden wall 52.86054°N 3.05760°W	—	Early 19th century	A red brick house that has a dentilled eaves cornice with fluted decoration, and a slate roof. There are three storeys, three bays, and a service range at the rear. The central doorway has fluted pilasters and an open pediment. The windows are sashes, those in the ground floor with decorated cornices. To the right is a garden wall in red brick with stone coping, about 15 metres (49 ft) long.	II
The Red Lion Inn; 52.86082°N 3.05414°W		Early 19th century	A house, later a public house, it is in stuccoed red brick with a tile roof. It consists of a main range of two storeys and three bays, and a gabled bay to the left with three storeys. In the ground floor is a canted bay window and two Roman Doric porches with plain entablatures, the one to the left containing a doorway with a rectangular fanlight, and the one to the right infilled. The windows elsewhere are sashes.	II
Outbuilding behind Wynnstay Hotel; 52.85697°N 3.05605°W	—	Early 19th century	The outbuilding is in brick with a moulded eaves cornice in the centre block and a slate roof. There are two storeys and a front of eleven bays, the outer three bays at each end being gabled. In the central block is a round-arched colonnade, and the windows are sashes, some of them blind.	II
Milestone; 52.87206°N 3.04148°W		1826–27	The milestone was designed by Thomas Telford for his Holyhead Road, and stands on the east side of the B5069 road. It is in Red Wharf Bay sandstone and is tapering with a pointed head. Recessed into it is a cast iron panel inscribed with the distances to Holyhead and to "SALOP" (Shrewsbury).	II
Jones Memorial; 52.85719°N 3.05860°W	—	c. 1827	The memorial is in the churchyard of St Oswald's Church and is to the memory of William Jones. It is in sandstone and is a rectangular chest tomb. The tomb has a moulded plinth and capping, panelled corner pilasters, a chamfered top ledger, and a moulded inscription panel on the north side.	II
16–22 Salop Road; 52.85844°N 3.05222°W	—	1827–28	A terrace of two pairs of houses in red brick with a dentilled eaves cornice and a slate roof. There are three storeys, and each pair of houses has four bays, the central two bays projecting and pedimented. In the ground floor are bay windows and doorways with fanlights and pediments. Most of the windows are sashes, and to the right is a segmental-headed passageway.	II
Plas Wilmot; 52.85044°N 3.05562°W	—	c. 1829	A villa that was later extended, it is in red brick and stone, and has a slate roof. There are two storeys and the main block has three bays, the central bay gabled. The windows are sashes. To the west are a series of extensions, and further to the west is a service court. On the service court is a small leaded turret with a weathervane.	II
2 and 4 Albion Hill; 52.86045°N 3.05444°W	—	c. 1830	A pair of brick houses, later shops, with a moulded eaves cornice and a slate roof. They have three storeys, two bays, 20th-century shop fronts in the ground floor, and in the upper floors are sash windows with cambered heads.	II
7 and 9 Chapel Street and railings 52.86113°N 3.05615°W	—	c. 1830	A pair of red brick houses with a moulded eaves cornice and a slate roof. There are three storeys, the bottom storey a basement, and three bays. In the centre, four steps lead up to double doors with rectangular fanlights in a Roman Doric portico with metopes, triglyphs and mutules. The windows are sashes, and above the portico is a blind window. Flanking the steps and extending to enclose the forecourt are railings on a low stone plinth.	II
25 Leg Street; 52.85959°N 3.05338°W	—	c. 1830	A house, later a shop, at right angles to the street, in red brick with a slate roof, hipped to the right. On the front is a lean-to obscuring a round-arched entrance, and in the side facing the street is a 19th-century shop front. The windows are sashes.	II
Kingswell Community Centre; 52.86058°N 3.05622°W		1830	A chapel, later used for other purposes, it is in red brick with a band, a moulded eaves cornice, a shaped pediment, and a slate roof. There are two storeys and three bays. In the centre is a Greek Doric porch with fluted columns and a moulded entablature. The windows are sashes in round-headed double recesses, and at the rear is a gable and two round-headed windows.	II
The Willow Tree; 52.86110°N 3.05838°W	—	c. 1830	An inn on a corner site, later used for other purposes, it is in painted brick with a dentilled eaves cornice and a slate roof, hipped to the left. There are three storeys, and fronts of three bays. The doorway has pilasters, a rectangular fanlight, and an open pediment, and the windows are sashes, with one blind window.	II
24 Cross Street; 52.85954°N 3.05415°W	—	c. 1830–40	A house, later used for other purposes, it is in rendered brick with chamfered quoins, a moulded eaves cornice, and a slate roof. There are two storeys and an attic, and three bays. In the ground floor is a 19th-century bank front with pilasters, a moulded entablature, and double doors with a latticed fanlight. In the upper floor are sash windows in moulded architraves, the central window being blind with a moulded entablature, and there are two flat-roofed eaves dormers.	II
Hunt memorial 52.85736°N 3.05851°W	—	c. 1831	The memorial is in the churchyard of St Oswald's Church and is to the memory of Thomas Hunt. It is a square pedestal tomb in sandstone and has a moulded plinth and capping, a chamfered top ledger and panelled corner pilasters.	II
6 Albion Hill; 52.86047°N 3.05428°W	—	1832	A house, later a shop, in brick with a moulded eaves cornice, and a slate roof. There are three storeys and five bays, the centre slightly recessed and angled. In the ground floor is a 20th-century shop front, the middle window in the middle floor is a French window, most of the other windows are sashes, and some are blind. Above the top middle window is a datestone.	II
Jones memorial 52.85695°N 3.05790°W	—	c. 1835	The memorial is in the churchyard of St Oswald's Church adjacent to the church, and is to the memory of Catherine Jones. It is in sandstone, and consists of a rectangular chest tomb. The tomb has a moulded plinth and capping, reeded pilasters, and moulded inscription panels.	II
Llovan Cottage; 52.85695°N 3.05894°W	—	Early to mid 19th century (probable)	A roughcast brick house with wide eaves and a hipped slate roof. There are two storeys and three bays. The central doorway has a pointed fanlight and an open pediment. The casement windows have cast iron lattice glazing, with single-pointed heads in the ground floor and twin-pointed heads in the upper floor.	II
Holy Trinity Church; 52.85749°N 3.05191°W		1835–37	The church was designed by Thomas Penson, and extended in 1893–94 by Eustace Frere. The church is built in limestone and has a slate roof. It originally consisted of a wide nave and a chancel with an apsidal sanctuary. Frere added a baptistry, a south porch, a south chapel, and a northeast steeple and vestry. The steeple has a tower with full-height clasping buttresses, and an oak-shingled spire with corner spirelets and narrow gabled lucarnes. On the nave are corner crocketed pinnacles.	II
14–18 Roft Street; 52.85747°N 3.05282°W	—	1840	A terrace of red brick houses with a slate roof. There are two storeys, and each house has two bays. The doorways have pilasters and radial fanlights, and the windows are sashes. To the left is a round-arched passageway, and above it is a datestone.	II
Porkington Terrace; 52.86175°N 3.05937°W	—	1840	A terrace of five red brick houses with a moulded eaves cornice, a parapet, and a slate roof. There are three storeys, and each house has three bays. The doorways have rectangular fanlights and bracketed hoods, and the windows are sashes.	II
Pavement, steps and railings, Porkington Terrace; 52.86177°N 3.05927°W	—	1840	A limestone wall forms a revetment wall to a raised pavement running in front of the terrace, with a flight of eight steps at the southeast ends, also in limestone. On the wall are cast iron railings.	II
48 and 50 Salop Road; 52.85766°N 3.05147°W	—	1841	A pair of red brick houses with a sill band, a moulded eaves cornice, and a hipped slate roof. There are three storeys and four bays, the middle two bays projecting forward with a pediment containing a datestone. In the centre are doorways, each with pilasters, a rectangular fanlight, and a pedimented hood. Flanking the doorways are canted bay windows, and above the windows are sashes.	II
Lodge, gates and railings, Brogyntyn Park; 52.86406°N 3.06543°W	—	After 1842	The buildings are at the south entrance to the grounds of Brogyntyn. The gateway lodge is in Grinshill sandstone and stone-faced brick, and is in Greek Revival style. It consists of a triumphal arch with two pairs of Ionic columns, flanked by single-storey single-bay wings with doubly-recessed arches. At the sides are wrought iron railings on low quadrant walls ending in subsidiary entrances with moulded entablatures and wrought iron gates.	II
Boar's Head Inn; 52.85946°N 3.05637°W		Mid 19th century	A remodelling of an earlier building, it is partly in rendered timber framing, and partly in brick, with a slate roof. There are three storeys, a front of three bays, and a long rear range. The front has a moulded sill band, and a corbelled eaves cornice. In the ground floor is a wide passageway on the left, on the right is an inn front, and in the upper floors are sash windows with moulded surrounds.	II
Oswestry railway station 52.86123°N 3.05008°W		1860–61	The station was built for the Oswestry and Newtown Railway, it later became the headquarters of Cambrian Railways, closing in 1966, and it has since been used for other purposes. The station building is in red brick on a stone plinth, with stone dressings, chamfered angle quoins, bands, a bracketed eaves cornice, and a hipped slate roof. There are two storeys and an entrance front of 22 bays, two blocks of bays projecting forward. The windows are sashes with round heads, projecting keystones, and moulded cills. On the platform front are 19 bays and a full-height canted bay window.	II
Hermon Chapel; 52.86119°N 3.05633°W		1862	An independent chapel designed by Thomas Thomas in Italianate style, it is in red brick, stuccoed at the front and rendered at the rear, and with a slate roof. There is one storey and a front of three bays. On the front are four giant Doric pilasters and a pediment with an inscription in the tympanum. In the centre is a round-headed doorway with pilasters, moulded voussoirs, and a keyblock, and above it is a tripartite window. The other windows are tall and round-headed, those in the front with moulded architraves, small keyblocks, and bracketed sills. The interior has been well preserved, including galleries on three sides on cast iron columns.	II*
Former railway works and footbridge 52.8628°N 3.0475°W		1865–66	The works for the Cambrian Railways, later used for other purposes, are built in brick with roofs of slate and corrugated iron, and parts are in steel. The main range has a central gabled section of three storeys and two bays, flanked by gabled sections each with two storeys and three bays. To the right are three further gabled sections, and to the left is the single-storey seven-bay engine shed. At the rear are further ranges forming a courtyard, and beyond is a boiler house with a tall tapering octagonal chimney. The windows on the front have round heads, there are circular windows in the gables, and on the main section is a wooden belfry. Extending from the front of the building is a wrought iron footbridge carried on two sets of cast iron columns and a central brick pier.	II
Goods shed 52.86056°N 3.05085°W		c. 1874	The goods shed was built for the Cambrian Railway Company, and later used as a museum. It is in brick on a blue brick plinth and has an asbestos tile roof. There is a single storey and a rectangular plan. The east front has two doorways with elliptical heads, and four raking buttresses in blue engineering brick. In the north front is a lean-to office and sash windows, some of them horizontally-sliding.	II
Lamp, St Oswald's Church; 52.85709°N 3.05827°W	—	Late 19th century	The lamp is in the churchyard, it is in cast iron, and has a twisted shaft with scrolled projections at the top. There is a vase-shaped lamp, originally for gas, but later converted for electricity.	II
Signal box 52.86025°N 3.05057°W		Late 19th century	The signal box is in Oswestry railway station. It is in red brick, it has a slate roof with a pointed wooden finial, and there are two levels. In the lower level are two round-headed fixed windows, and in the upper level are extensive windows. A flight of wooden steps in the left gable end lead to a doorway in the upper level.	II
Signal post 52.85968°N 3.05061°W		Late 19th century (probable)	The signal post is to the south of Oswestry railway station. It is in steel or wrought iron, and has a tubular post with a diagonal stay supporting a platform. From the platform rise two posts with a ladder each, and one signal arm has survived.	II
The Guildhall; 52.86092°N 3.05476°W		1893	The Guildhall is in limestone with a moulded eaves cornice, sill bands, and a tile roof. There are three storeys and attics, and a front of four bays, the first and third bays projecting and with shaped gables. The windows are mullioned or mullioned and transomed, and some have round heads. The round-headed doorway has an entablature, a fluted keystone and imposts, and a decorated broken segmental pediment. Other features include niches, carvings of grotesque figures, and a roundel containing a carving of a seated king.	II
4 and 6 The Cross; 52.85935°N 3.05521°W	—	1905–06	A bank designed by Shayler and Ridge in Jacobean style, it is in sandstone with a tile roof. There are three storeys and four bays, with the entrance in the left bay. The other three bays have pedimented gables, and there is a round angle turret on the right with a bronze-topped dome and a pointed finial. In the top floor are three-light mullioned windows, the middle floor contains oriel windows, and in the ground floor are three-light windows with pilasters.	II
Oswestry War Memorial; 52.85792°N 3.05691°W		c. 1920	The war memorial stands at the entrance to Cae Glas Park. It consists of four limestone gate piers, each with a square section and a moulded plinth. Between the central pair are ornamental wrought iron gates, and outside are pedestrian gates and low stone walls with railings extending to end piers. The central piers have inscriptions and the names of those lost in the two World Wars.	II
Cambrian Railways War Memorial; 52.85782°N 3.05698°W		1924	The memorial is to the members of the staff of Cambrian Railways who were lost in the First World War, and was moved from Oswestry railway station after its closure in 1966. It consists of a stone pillar about 2 metres (6 ft 7 in) high. On the front is a female figure in bronze, behind which is a marble panel with a rising sun motif in low relief. Below the statue is a panel with an inscription and the names of those lost. There is another plaque in slate inscribed with details of its erection on the current site in 1975.	II
