= Wilfred Owen Green =

Town green in Oswestry, Shropshire, England

Coordinates: 52°51′40″N 3°2′57″W

Wilfred Owen Green is the town green located in the middle of the town Oswestry in Shropshire, England.

== About ==
This site is a newly established town green for Oswestry, having previously been 5 acres of derelict railway land. It was subject to a controversial public enquiry which eventually granted the land Village green status in November 2008. It was officially opened on Friday 23 July 2010 at 4pm, this date was chosen as it coincided with the schools summer holidays, and the design for the area was meant to encourage children to play outside. It was named after the war poet from Oswestry Wilfred Owen due to his affection for nature and children.

== Wilfred Owen Green project ==
Shropshire Council’s Conservation and Community Officer was able to acquire £90,000 of extra funding allowing the budget to expand to £170,000. The rest of the funding came from other sources, including Natural England’s Natural Assets, Play England, and Advantage West Midlands. The council announced the site "will be a haven to both residents and wildlife".

== The Site ==
The area of green space includes formal design at one end, gently blending into a more natural area of wildflower meadows, woodland, imaginative areas of mounds and hollows, log and boulder piles and one of the largest labyrinths worldwide.

== Wildlife ==
The wildflower meadows are great for wildlife such as bees, and butterflies, a small orchard and new hedges have been established which will provide birds with food, and shelter.

In the future the ecology of this area will be observed, and to allow to biodiversity to improve and fulfil its potential. Plans are to allow the site to become even wilder and therefore better for wildlife, and will eventually blend in with the Shelf Bank Site (a future Local Nature Reserve) which is situated next to Wilfred Owen Green.
