= Shelf Bank =

Hill/nature reserve in Shropshire, England

Coordinates: 52.86196°N 3.04711°W

Highest point
- Elevation: 145 m (476 ft)

Geography
- Location: Shropshire, England
- OS grid: SJ296299
- Topo map: OS Landranger 126

Shelf Bank is a hill in the centre of Oswestry which has been a local nature reserve since 2014. It has an elevation of 145 m (476 ft) and is a 3-hectare (7.4-acre) area consisting of acid grassland and naturally regenerated areas of woodland and scrub.

== Location and surroundings ==
The site occupies the majority of a knoll which offers views across Oswestry town and the wider Shropshire countryside. For that reason during World War II anti-aircraft guns and lookout posts were established on the summit. Along the southern edge of the site there can be found a section of Wat's Dyke, an earth bank structure dating back to the Dark Ages. On the North side, it was surrounded by a vast desolate area of old railway sidings of the Cambrian Railways' Oswestry Branch Line (closed by 1966) and a huge Victorian engineering works, that has now been converted into a new Health Centre. On the rare occasions when snow falls in the town, it provides the local populace with superb sledging opportunities.

== Recent history ==
Local legend had it that the land was donated to "the children of Oswestry" by a long-forgotten landlord and as a result of its disputed ownership has proved very difficult to redevelop, despite occupying valuable land just outside the town centre.

The site was compulsorily purchased in 2005 by Oswestry Borough Council to ensure it could be managed for wildlife and the quiet recreation of Oswestry residents and visitors alike. Shelf Bank was not left to the children of Oswestry, it was only through the intervention of Shropshire County Council staff that the previous owner of the site was finally found and the land purchased for the people of Oswestry.

Shelf Bank is now managed by Shropshire Council who succeeded in having it designated a Local nature Reserve in May 2014. A local group, 'The Friends of Shelf Bank' has also been founded and a management plan implemented ensuring this jewel of Oswestry's Green Network is enjoyed for its flourishing biodiversity, its heritage and views for generations to come.
