= Oswestry Guildhall =

Municipal building in Oswestry, Shropshire, England

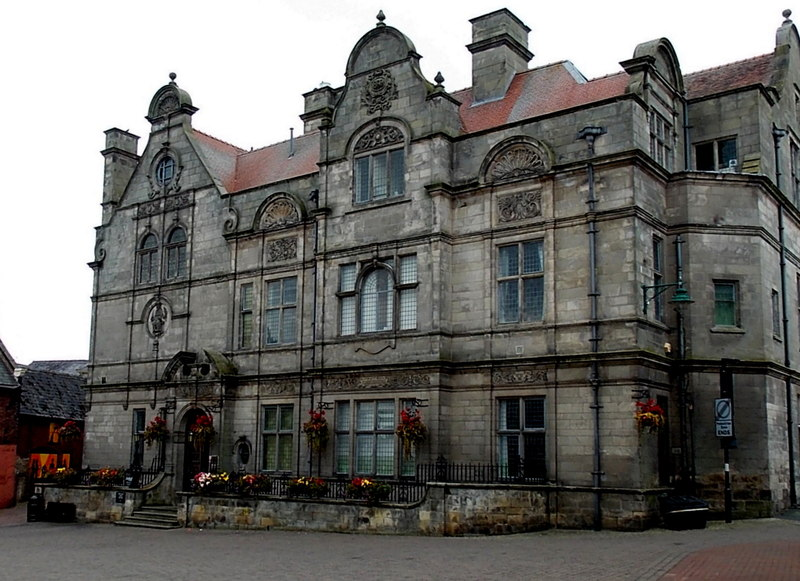
- Oswestry Guildhall

- Shown in Shropshire
- 52.8608°N 3.0548°W
- Location: Bailey Head, Oswestry

History
- Built: 1893

Site notes
- Architect: Henry Cheers
- Architectural style: Renaissance style

Listed Building – Grade II
- Official name: The Guildhall
- Designated: 15 May 1986
- Reference no.: 1367321

Oswestry Guildhall is a municipal building in Bailey Head in Oswestry, Shropshire, England. The structure, which was the meeting place of Oswestry Municipal Borough Council, is a Grade II listed building.

== History ==
The first guildhall in the town, which was described as "a plain stone-fronted edifice, with a high clock turret", was located on the north side of Bailey Head and dated back at least to the early 16th century. It was in this building that the Bishop of St Asaph, William Lloyd, interviewed the non-conformist minister, Philip Henry, in September 1681. (Note: The first guildhall became a corn exchange in 1838 and was expanded to the rear to create a new indoor market which was opened on 6 June 1849. The whole structure was demolished in the 1960s and replaced with the current indoor market in 1963.)

A second municipal building was erected on the west side of Bailey Head in 1782. This building was designed in the neoclassical style with seven bays facing onto Bailey Head; the central section of three bays, which slightly projected forward, featured a doorway in the middle bay, sash windows on the first floor and a pediment above containing a carved figure of King Oswald in the tympanum. Following significant population growth, largely associated with Oswestry's status as a market town, the area became a municipal borough in 1835. This second building became the headquarters of the new municipal borough and was designated "the guildhall" in 1838 when the first guildhall was converted for use as a corn exchange. The land on which the buildings at Bailey Head stood was presented to the town by the lord of the manor, the 2nd Earl of Powis, shortly before he died in 1848. The second guildhall was enlarged in 1877.

After the second guildhall was found to be unstable in 1890, civic leaders decided to demolish the old building and to erect a new structure on the same site. A third guildhall was designed by Henry Cheers in the Renaissance style, built in ashlar stone by W. H. Thomas of Oswestry at a cost of £11,000 and was officially opened by the 4th Earl of Powis in November 1893. The design involved an asymmetrical main frontage with four bays facing onto Bailey Head. The left bay featured a round headed doorway flanked by Doric order pilasters supporting an entablature and an open pediment; above to the left, on the first floor, there was a roundel containing a figure of a King Oswald, while on the second floor was a pair of mullion windows with a shaped gable above containing an oculus. The third bay, which slightly projected forward, featured a Venetian window on the first floor and a three-light mullion window on the second floor with a shaped gable above containing a stone inscribed with the date of construction. Internally, the principal rooms were the council chamber in the north east corner of the ground floor, the courtroom on the first floor and the lending library on the second floor.

The guildhall, and the adjoining council offices built just behind the building, continued to serve as the headquarters of Corporation of Oswestry for much of the 20th century; the buildings also served as the meeting place of the enlarged Oswestry Rural District Council from 1967, and of the enlarged Oswestry District Council from 1974. A redundant courtroom became the home of the Arts Club, later known as the Attfield Theatre, in 1972.

After a major programme of restoration works, which was financed in part by the Heritage Lottery Fund and involved the eradication of extensive dry rot, the guildhall was re-opened by the Lord Lieutenant of Shropshire, Algernon Heber-Percy, in April 2000. It ceased to be the local seat of government when the new unitary council, Shropshire Council, was formed in April 2009, but remained the home of the Attfield Theatre and, from 2012, also accommodated the local museum. It also became the meeting place of Oswestry Town Council. Works of art in the guildhall include a landscape by G. Bonner depicting the second guildhall.

== See also ==
- Listed buildings in Oswestry
