= Oswestry =

Town in Shropshire, England

Coordinates: 52.8598°N 3.0538°W

Oswestry: Welsh: Croesoswallt
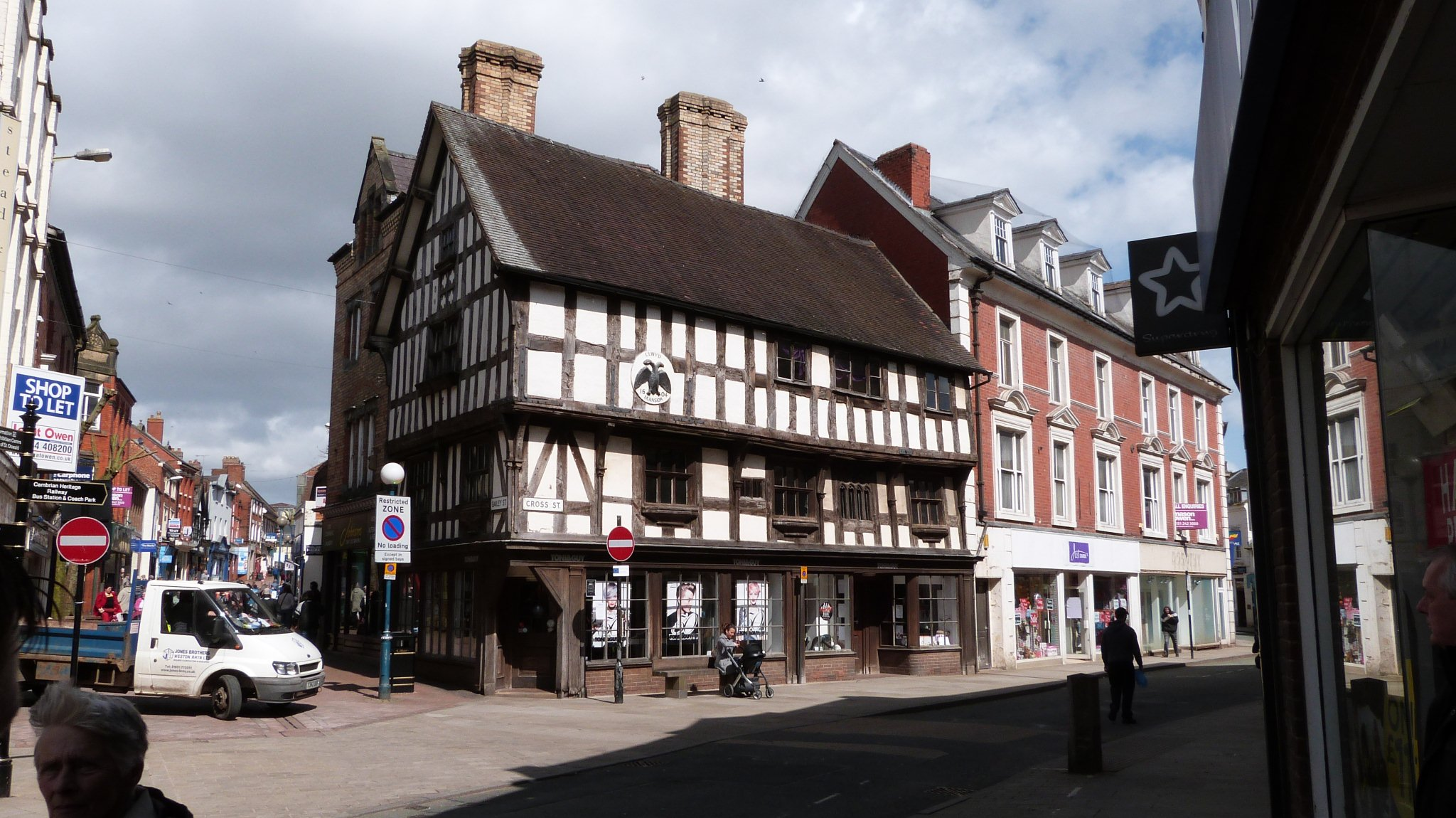
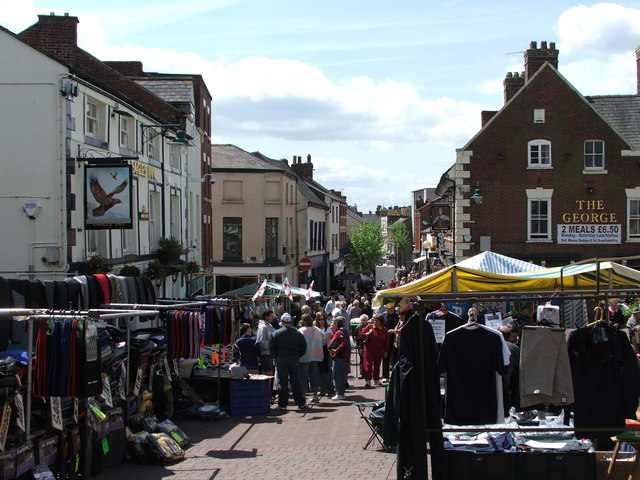
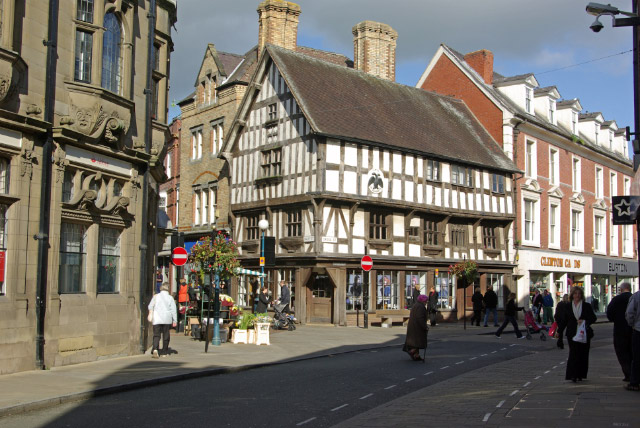
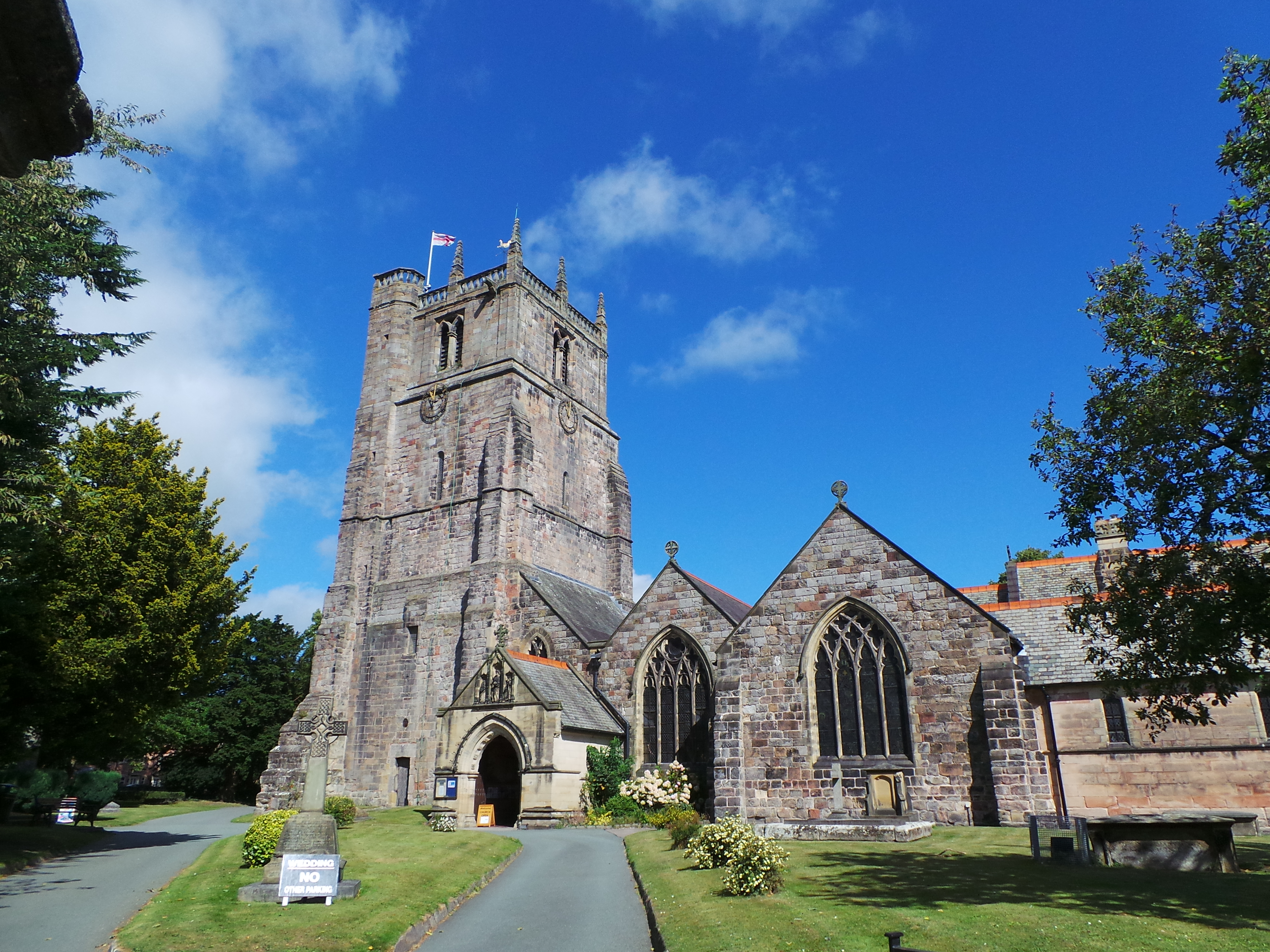
- Clockwise from top: Llwyd Mansion, Cross Street, St Oswald's Church, Oswestry Market

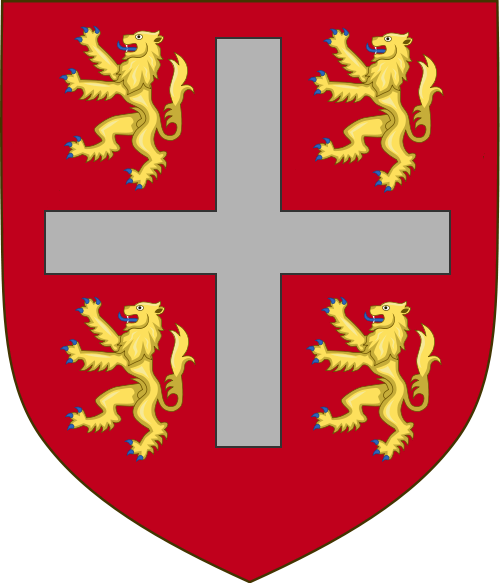
- Coat of arms of Oswestry; Motto: Floreat Oswestria ('May Oswestry flourish')

- Location within Shropshire
- Population: 17,509 (2021 Census)
- OS grid reference: SJ292293
  - London: 179 mi (288 km) SE
- Civil parish: Oswestry
- Unitary authority: Shropshire
- Ceremonial county: Shropshire
- Region: West Midlands
- Country: England
- Sovereign state: United Kingdom
- Post town: OSWESTRY
- Postcode district: SY10, SY11
- Dialling code: 01691
- ISO 3166 code: GB-SHR
- Police: West Mercia
- Fire: Shropshire
- Ambulance: West Midlands
- UK Parliament: North Shropshire
- Councillors: 4 Shropshire Councillors; Lib Dems - 3; Green - 1; 18 Town Councillors; Lib Dems - 12; Green - 3; Independent - 3
- Website: Oswestry Town Council

Oswestry (/ˈɒzwəstri/ OZ-wəss-tree; Welsh: Croesoswallt) is an ancient market town, civil parish and historic railway town in Shropshire, England, close to the Welsh border. It is at the junction of the A5, A483 and A495 roads.

The town was the administrative headquarters of the Borough of Oswestry until that was abolished in 2009. At the 2021 Census, the population of Oswestry was 17,509. The town is five miles (8.0 km) from the Welsh border and has a mixed English and Welsh heritage.

Oswestry is the largest settlement within the Oswestry Uplands, a designated natural area and national character area.

== Toponym ==
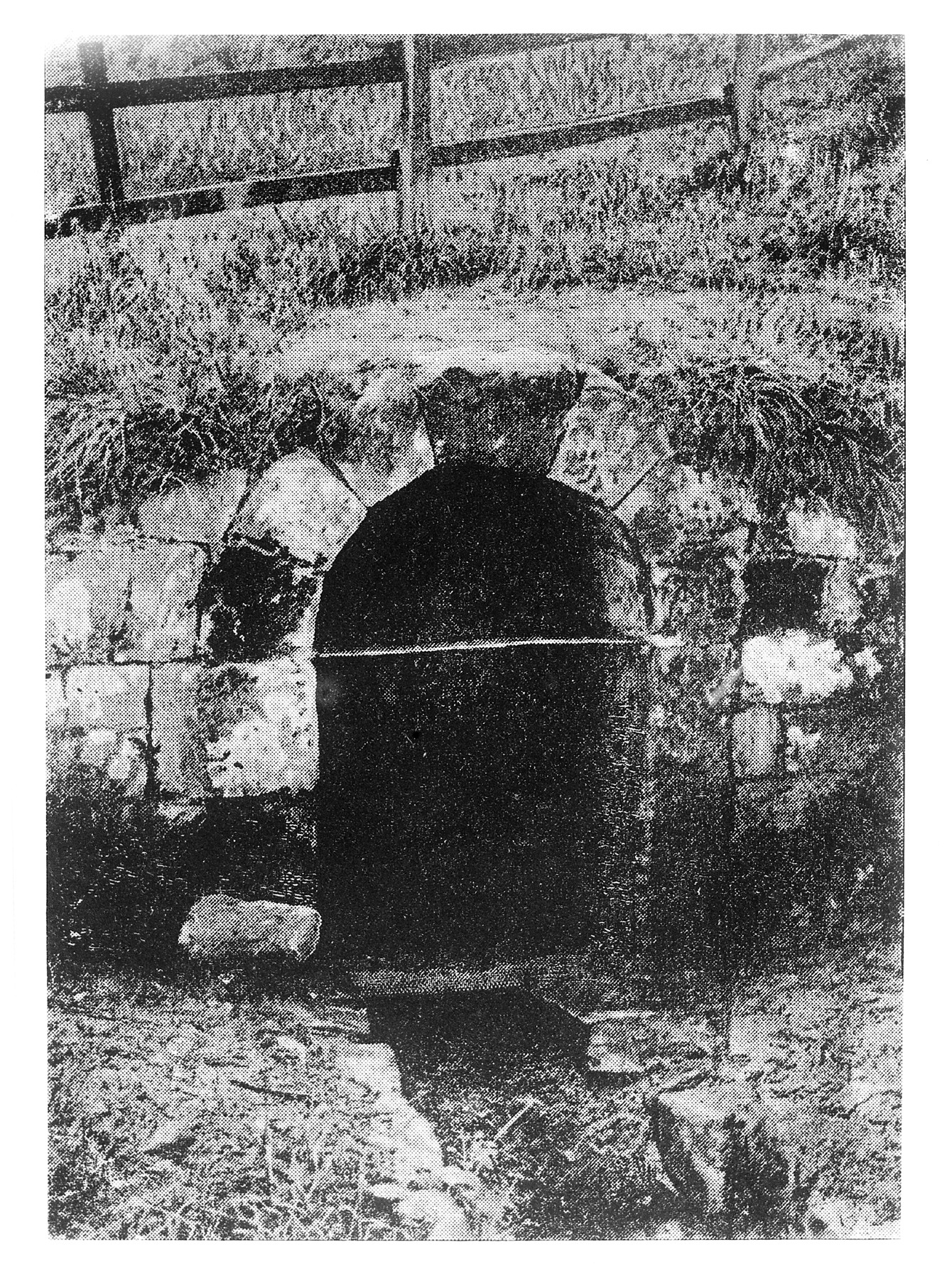
St Oswald's Well, believed to cure eye trouble. Image from Hope's book on Holy Wells.

The name Oswestry is first attested in 1191, as Oswaldestroe. This Middle English name transparently derives from the Old English personal name Ōswald and the word trēow ('tree'). Thus the name seems once to have meant 'tree of a man called Ōswald'. Oswestry Town Council refers to a charter of 1262 "granted by John FitzAlan, Lord of the Manor To our Burgesses of our village of Oswaldestree". However, the traditional Welsh name for the town, Croesoswallt (first attested in 1254), means 'Oswald's cross', and 'cross' is a possible meaning of Old English trēow. Thus the town's name may have meant 'Oswald's cross' in both English and Welsh.

The Oswald mentioned is widely imagined to have been Oswald of Northumbria, who died at the Battle of Maserfield in 641/642. The location of the battle is debated among scholars, but for much of the twentieth century was assumed to be at Oswestry. However, A. D. Mills's Dictionary of English Place Names concluded that "the traditional connection with St Oswald, 7th-century king of Northumbria, is uncertain".

The name and the association with King Oswald have attracted more fanciful interpretations. According to legend, one of Oswald's dismembered arms was carried to an ash tree by a raven. Miracles were subsequently attributed to the tree, and the legend has it that this was "Oswald's Tree", and gave its name to the town. A spring called 'Oswald's Well' is supposed to have originated where the bird dropped the arm from the tree, though one historian has suggested that it was likely to have had sacred associations long before Oswald's time. The water from the well was believed to have healing properties, particularly for curing eye trouble. Offa's Dyke runs near the well, to the west. This interpretation is supported by a passage in Fouke le Fitz Waryn (a 13th-century romance) which states that Oswaldestré was derived from Arbre Oswald (Oswald's tree), which in turn was changed from La Blanche Launde (Welsh: y tir Gwyn), which belonged to a Briton called Meredus Fitz Beledyns (Maredudd ap Bleddyn).

There is an alternative view that Oswestry was named after Oswy, Oswald's brother, who fought a battle here against King Penda in 655 AD. Oswy became King of Northumbria after Oswald's death in 642 AD. The battle of 655 AD was fought near to a river called the Winwead, which it is believed, was the nearby River Vyrnwy. Welsh folklore has it that this battle was called the battle of Pengwern and in it their leader Cynddylan was also killed.

== History ==
=== Prehistory ===
The earliest known human settlement in Oswestry is Old Oswestry, one of the best-preserved Iron Age hill forts in Britain, with evidence of construction and occupation between 800 BC and 43 AD. The site is known in Welsh as Caer Ogyrfan, meaning 'City of Gogyrfan', referring to the father of Guinevere in Arthurian legend.

=== Saxon times ===
The Battle of Maserfield is widely thought to have been fought at Oswestry in 641 or 642, between the Anglo-Saxon kings Penda of Mercia and Oswald of Northumbria. However, the location of the battle is debated among scholars.

=== The Conquest ===
The Domesday Book of 1086 records a castle being built by Rainald, a Norman Sheriff of Shropshire: L'oeuvre (French for 'The work').

Alan fitz Flaad (died c.1120), a Breton knight, was granted the feudal barony of Oswestry by King Henry I who, soon after his accession, invited Alan to England with other Breton friends, and gave him forfeited lands in Norfolk and Shropshire, including some which had previously belonged to Ernulf de Hesdin (killed at Antioch while on crusade) and Robert of Bellême.

Alan's duties to the Crown included supervision of the Welsh border. He also founded Sporle Priory in Norfolk. He married Ada or Adeline, daughter of Ernulf de Hesdin. Their eldest son William FitzAlan was made High Sheriff of Shropshire by King Stephen in 1137. He married a niece of Robert of Gloucester. Alan's younger son, Walter, travelled to Scotland in the train of King David I, Walter becoming the first hereditary Steward of Scotland and ancestor of the Stewart Royal family.

=== Border town ===
The town changed hands between the English and the Welsh a number of times during the Middle Ages and still retains some Welsh-language street and place names. In 1972, ITV broadcast a television report asking residents if they thought the town should be English or Welsh, with mixed responses.

In 1149 the castle was captured by Madog ap Maredudd during 'The Anarchy', and it remained in Welsh hands until 1157. Sir William Dugdale, writing of Ranulf de Blondeville, 6th Earl of Chester, born c. 1170, explained the surname Blondville (or Blundevill) was an indication of the earl’s birthplace, which he identified as Oswestry, a Shropshire locale adjacent to the border with Powys. Occasionally in the 13th century it is referred to in official records as Blancmuster (1233) or Blancmostre (1272), meaning "White Minster". Later, Oswestry was attacked by the forces of Welsh rebel leader Owain Glyndŵr during the early years of his rebellion against the English King Henry IV in 1400; it became known as Pentrepoeth or "hot village" as it was burned and nearly totally destroyed by the Welsh. The castle was reduced to a pile of rocks during the English Civil War.

The town is now the home of the Shropshire libraries' Welsh Collection.

=== Market town ===
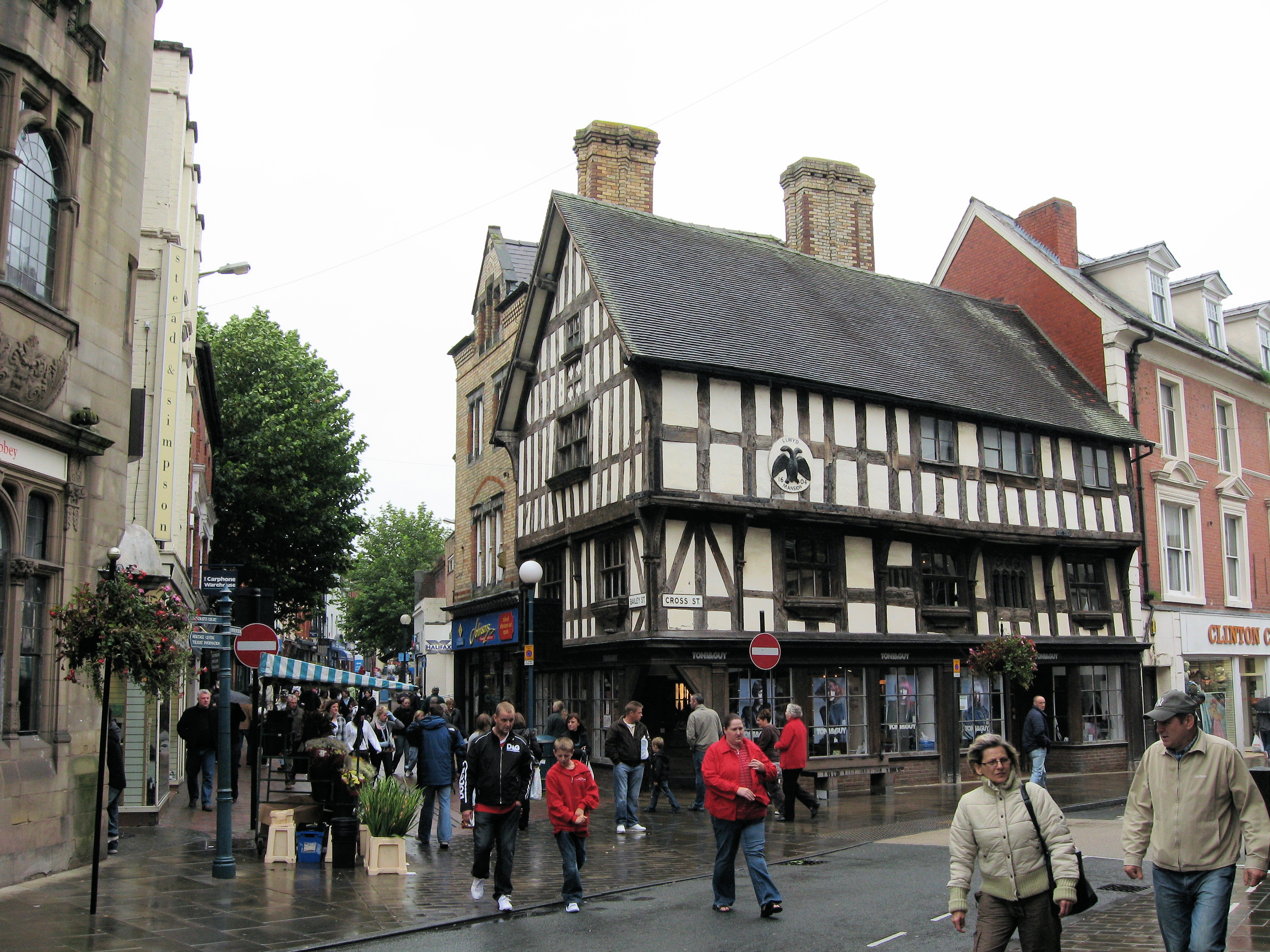
Oswestry – Historic buildings in the town centre, October 2008. Timber-framed building in foreground is Llwyd Mansion.

In 1190 the town was granted the right to hold a market each Wednesday. The town built walls for protection, but these were torn down in the English Civil War by the Parliamentarians after they took the town from the Royalists after a brief siege on 22 June 1644, leaving only the Newgate Pillar visible today.

After the foot and mouth outbreak in the late 1960s the animal market was moved out of the town centre. In the 1990s, a statue of a shepherd and sheep was installed in the market square as a memorial to the history of the market site.

=== Military ===
Park Hall, 1-mile (1.6 km) east of the town, was taken over by the Army during World War I in 1915 and used as a training camp and military hospital. On 26 December 1918 it burnt to the ground following an electrical fault. The ruined hall and camp remained derelict between the wars. The camp hospital, however, was still in use; the Baschurch Convalescent and Surgical Home moved there in February 1921 and it became known as the Robert Jones and Agnes Hunt Orthopaedic Hospital.

One of the main uses of the land from the 1920s was for motorcycle racing and it became quite a well-known circuit.

The camp was reactivated in July 1939 for Royal Artillery training and the Plotting Officers' School. Following World War II, Oswestry was a prominent military centre for Canadian troops, then for the British Royal Artillery, and finally a training centre for 15 to 17-year-old Infantry Junior Leaders. The camp closed in 1975. During the 1970s some local licensed wildfowlers discharged their shotguns at some passing ducks and were shot themselves by a young military guard, who had mistaken them for an attacking IRA force.

The area previously occupied by the Park Hall military camp is now mainly residential and agricultural land, with a small number of light industrial units. Park Hall Farm became a visitor attraction in 1998, it is home to the Museum of the Welsh Guards. The Park Hall Football Stadium (home of The New Saints FC) and The Venue is now closed pending redevelopment to enlarge capacity.

== Landmarks ==
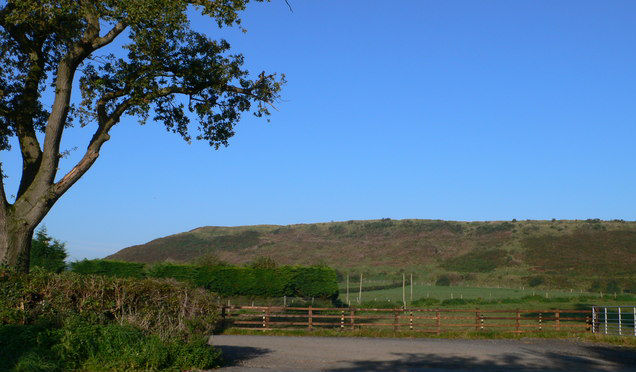
Old Oswestry

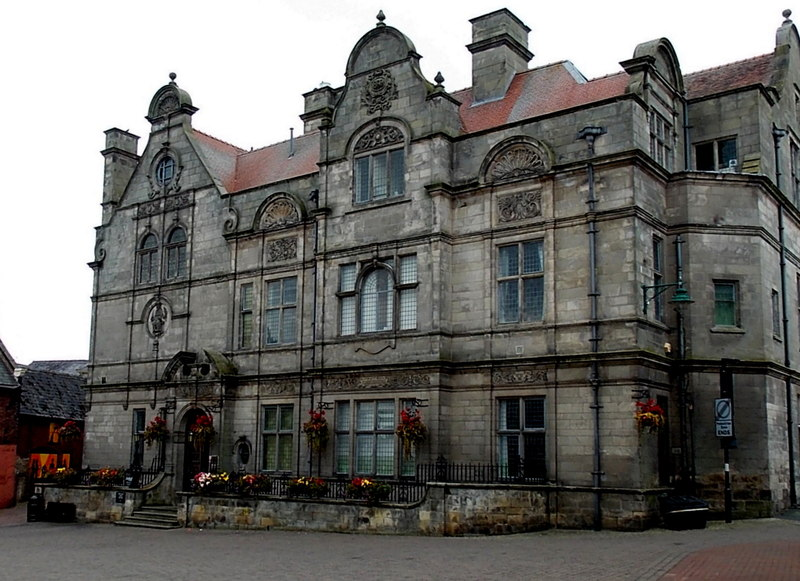
Oswestry Guildhall

Old Oswestry, on the northern edge of the town, dominates the northern and eastern approaches. The 3,000-year-old settlement is one of the most spectacular and best preserved Iron Age hill forts in Britain, with evidence of construction and occupation between 800 BC and AD 43.

Other attractions in and around Oswestry include: Cae Glas Park, Shelf Bank, Wilfred Owen Green, Saint Oswald's Well at Maserfield, Oswestry Castle, and the Cambrian Railway Museum located near the former railway station. Oswestry Guildhall, the meeting place of Oswestry Town Council, was completed in 1893.

A story incorporating the names of all of the many pubs once open in Oswestry can be found hanging on a wall inside The Oak Inn on Church Street. There is a tapestry of forty Oswestry pub signs on display in Oswestry Guildhall on the Bailey Head. The Stonehouse Brewery opened in 2007, on the site of the former Weston Wharf railway station at Weston, in nearby Oswestry Rural; Stonehouse Brewery supplies many of the pubs with real ale.

Brogyntyn Hall, which belonged to the Lords Harlech, lies just outside the town. Brogyntyn Park is five and a half acres of parkland occupying the southern slope of the Grade II listed Brogyntyn Estate. It was gifted to Oswestry Town Council by the fourth Lord Harlech, William Ormsby-Gore, in 1952.

== Governance ==
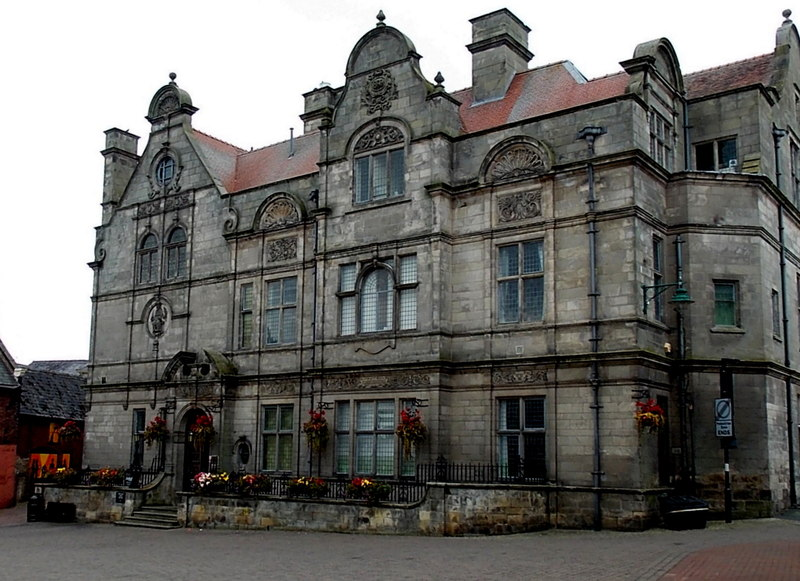
The Guildhall, Bailey Head: Oswestry Town Council's headquarters since the 1990s

There are two tiers of local government covering Oswestry, at parish (town) and unitary authority level: Oswestry Town Council and Shropshire Council. The Town Council is based at the Guildhall on the Bailey Head. Shropshire Council is based in Shrewsbury, at the Guildhall on Frankwell Quay.

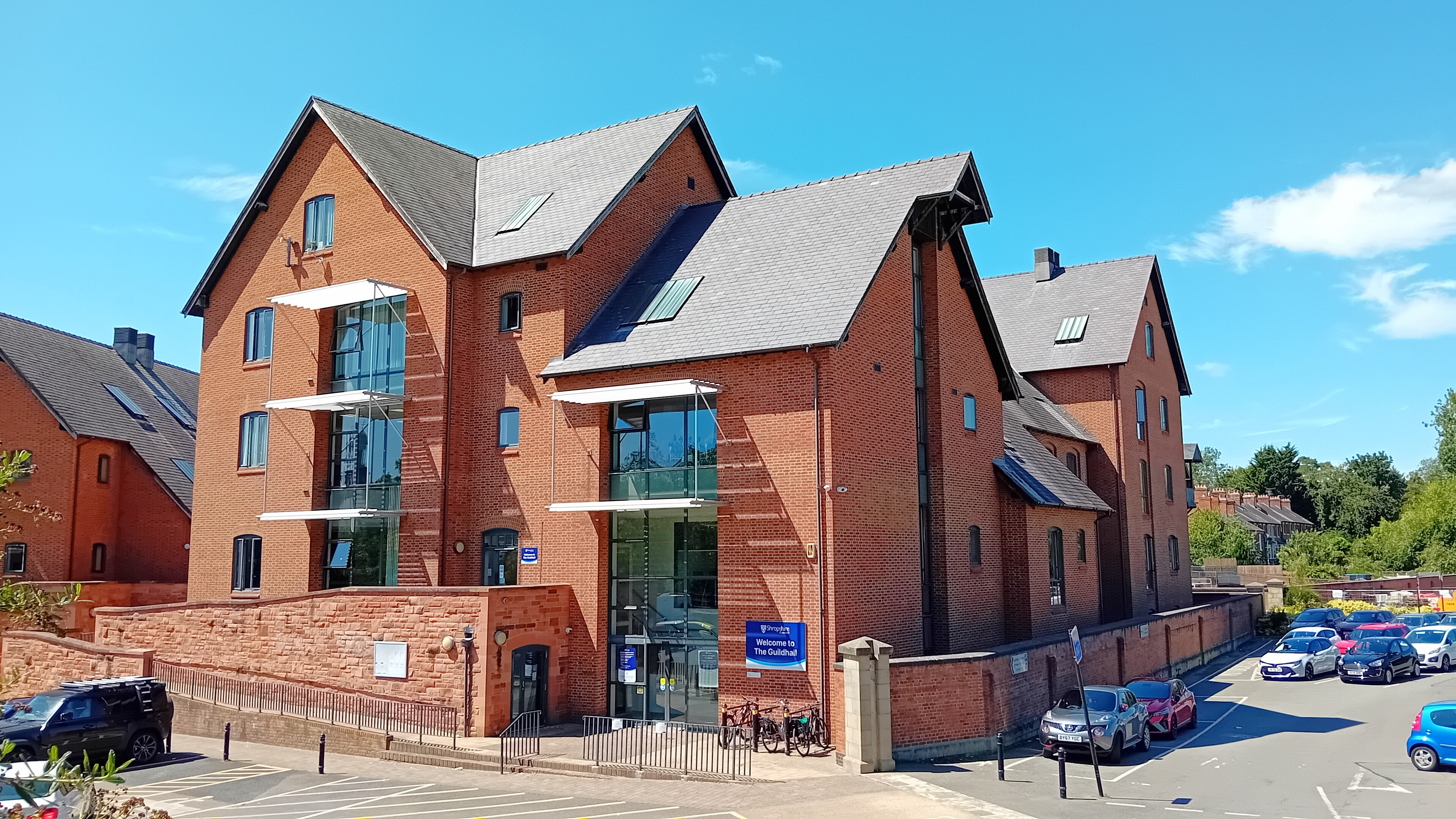
The Guildhall, Frankwell Quay, Shrewsbury: Shropshire Council's headquarters since 2025

Oswestry is in the North Shropshire constituency and is the largest settlement in the constituency. At the most recent general election, in 2024, Helen Morgan of the Liberal Democrats was re-elected with a majority of 15,311, after previously winning the 2021 North Shropshire by-election with a majority of 5,295. Previous Members of Parliament include Owen Paterson and John Biffen.

== Culture ==
There is a range of arts related activities in the town.

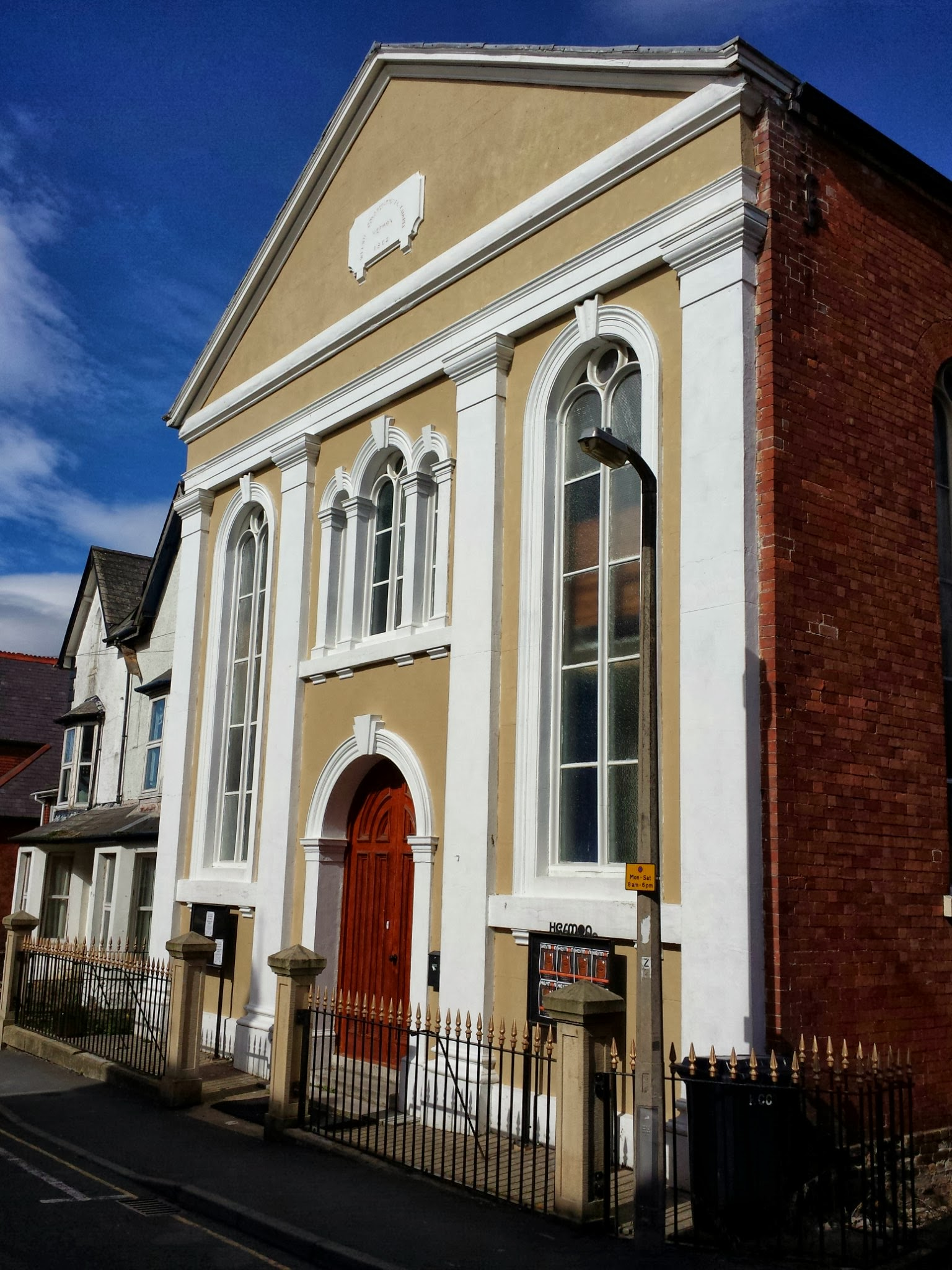
Hermon Chapel

- The Qube
- Oswestry Visitor & Exhibition Centre
- Willow Gallery
- The Oswestry Town Museum
- Cambrian Railways Museum
- Attfield Theatre
- Fusion Arts organises arts and music activities for young people.
- Kinokulture, a cinema (due to close by the end of April 2024)
- Hermon Chapel Arts Centre
- Oswestry Choral Society, the Oswestry Recorded Music Society, and the Oswestry Ladies Choir has developed.
- OsRocks Choir
- Wilfred Owen Green
- Borderland Visual Arts. A network of local artists which holds an annual Open Studios event
- Borderlines Film Festival
- The Oswestry Food and Drink Festival
- Oswestry Balloon Carnival
- The Whittington International Chamber Music Festival

== Religion ==
In the 2011 Census, 68.7% of the population of Shropshire stated that their religion was 'Christian'. The second largest group (22.8%) stated that they had 'no religion'.

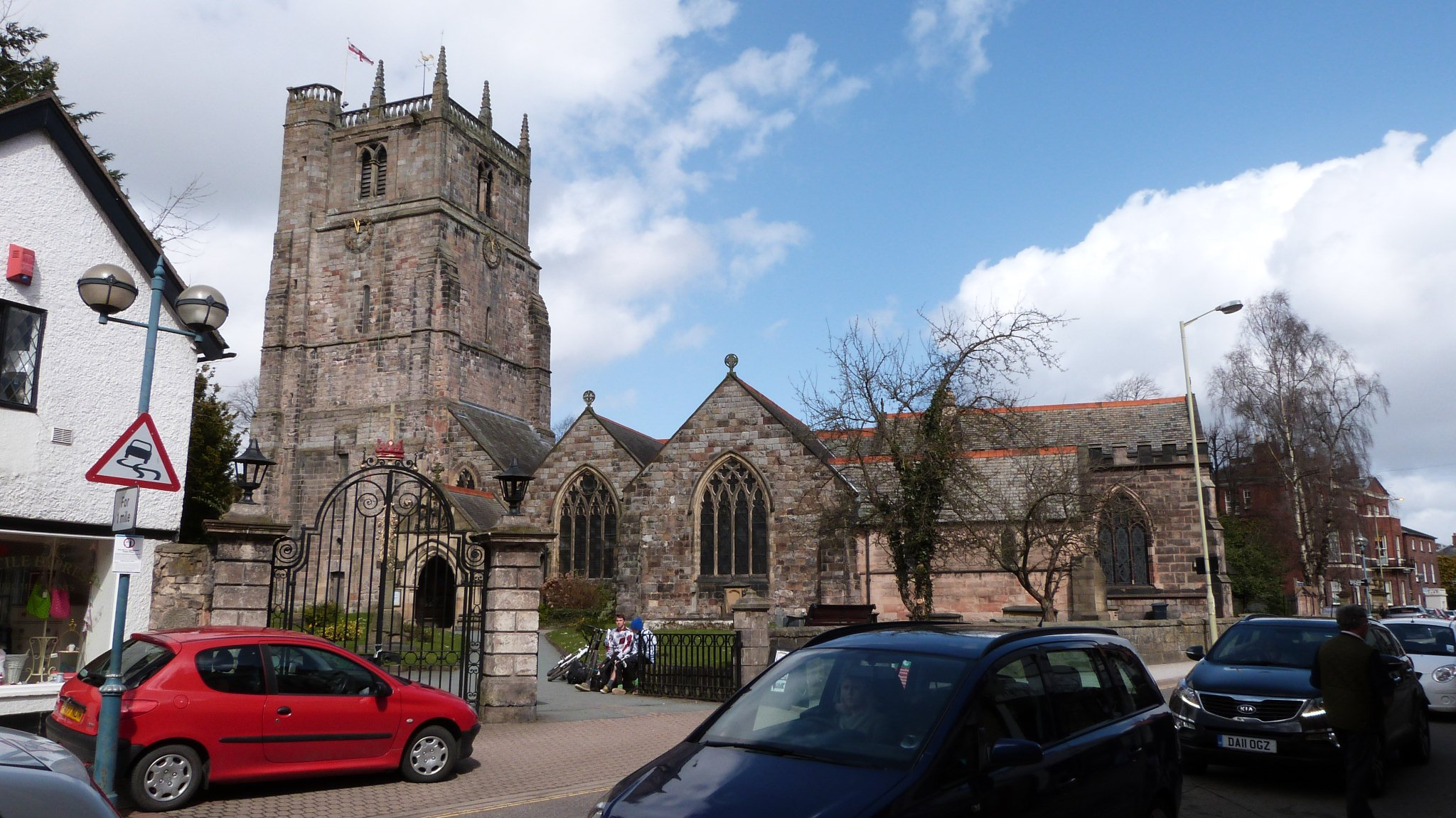
Parish Church of St Oswald

Oswestry is divided into two Church of England parishes, which are part of the Diocese of Lichfield: Holy Trinity, which encompasses Oswestry East and eastern part of Oswestry Rural; and St. Oswald, which encompasses Oswestry South, Oswestry West and the western part of Oswestry Rural. Each parish has its own parish church.

St Oswald's Church was first mentioned in the 1086 Domesday Book and a tithe document in Shrewsbury the same year. St Oswald's Church is Grade II* listed, having a tower dating from late 12th or early 13th century and later additions particularly in the 17th and 19th centuries. A window in the east nave was designed by stained glass artist Jane Gray.

In June 2022, it was announced that, from January 2023, oversight of traditional Catholics within the Anglican Church in the west of Province of Canterbury (formerly the Bishop of Ebbsfleet's area) would be taken by a new Bishop of Oswestry, suffragan to the Bishop of Lichfield. The Bishop of Oswestry serves the western 13 dioceses of the southern province (Bath and Wells, Birmingham, Bristol, Coventry, Derby, Exeter, Gloucester, Hereford, Lichfield, Oxford, Salisbury, Truro, and Worcester).

The town of Oswestry and surrounding villages fall into the parish of Our Lady Help of Christians and St Oswald, in the Roman Catholic Diocese of Shrewsbury. The single Catholic church is Our Lady and St Oswald's Catholic Church. There is an associated primary school.

There are two Methodist churches: the Horeb Church on Victoria Road and the Oswestry Methodist Church. Cornerstone Baptist Church is on the corner of Lower Brook Street and Roft Street in a modern 1970s building. Other Nonconformist churches include the Albert Road Evangelical Church, Hope Church, formerly Carreg Llwyd Church (Welsh for 'Grey Rock'), founded in 1964, and the Cabin Lane Church, established by members of the Hope Church in 1991 following the eastern expansion of Oswestry.

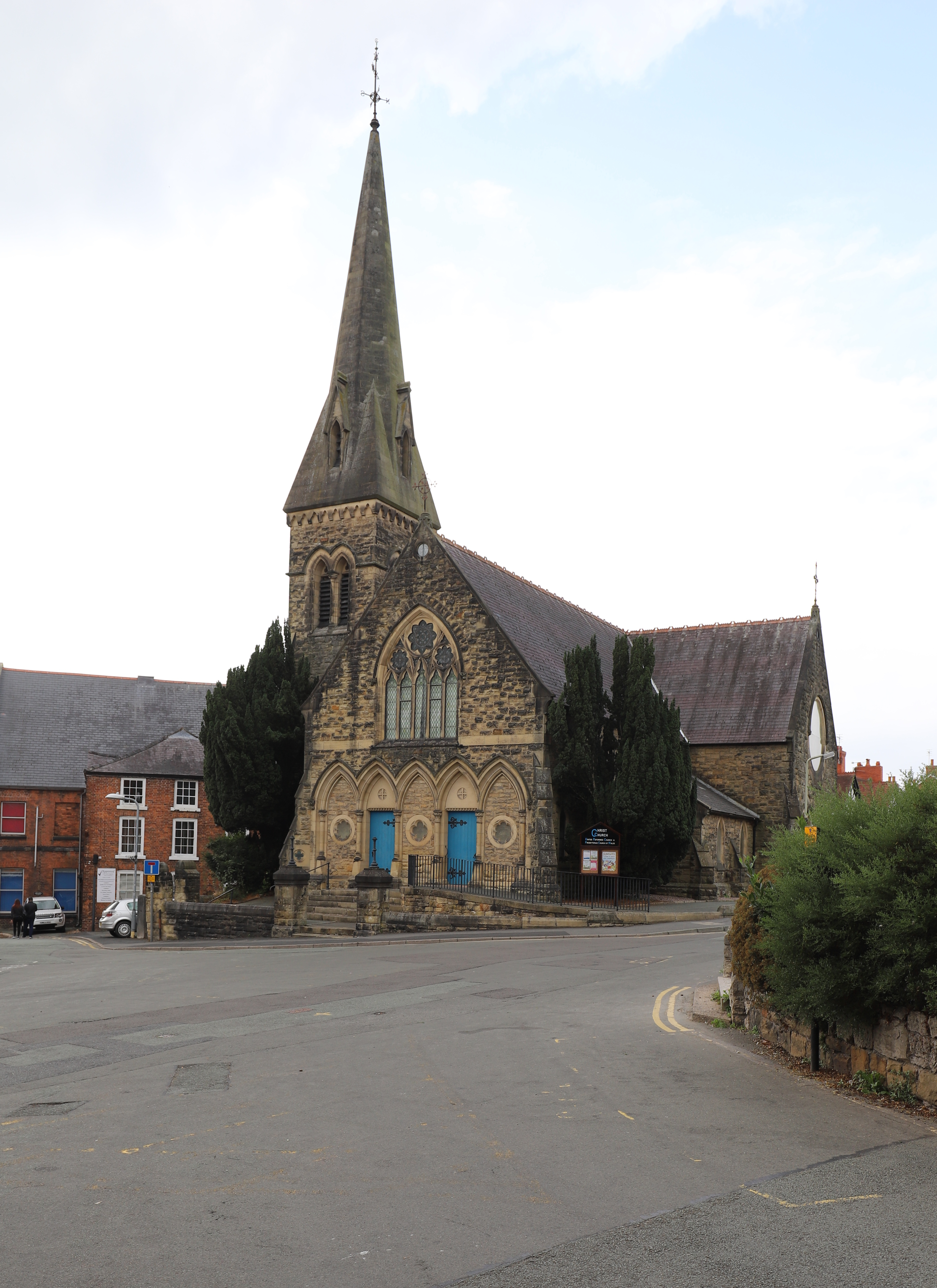
Christ Church, where the composer Walford Davies was a choirboy

Christ Church was opened by the Congregational Church in October 1972, but now shared by the United Reformed Church and the Presbyterian Church of Wales, was the home church of the composer Walford Davies, who sang in the choir. There is a Welsh-speaking church, the Seion Church, and the Holy Anglican Church, a Western Rite Anglican establishment. Coney Green has a Jehovah's Witness Kingdom Hall. The Religious Society of Friends also holds meetings in Oswestry. The Grade II* star Hermon Chapel, by chapel architect Thomas Thomas, was a Welsh-speaking Congregational church and is now an arts and community centre.

A small Muslim community exists in the town. A plan to transform a 19th-century former Presbyterian church on Oswald Road into a permanent base for meetings and prayer services fell through in March 2013 due to cost. New plans were submitted to Shropshire Council for approval in 2019, to convert the former Salvation Army citadel in King Street into an Islamic Prayer Centre. These plans were eventually approved by Shropshire Council.

There is a small Orthodox Christian community in Oswestry, which has increased in size over years due to the town's growing Bulgarian community. There is no Orthodox church in Oswestry, however, so congregants have to travel to the Greek Orthodox Community of the Holy Fathers of Nicaea, Shrewsbury, to worship. There used to be an Orthodox outreach at Holy Trinity Church for a few years, but a disagreement over the church layout brought this service to an end. Congregants also used to benefit from a Greek Orthodox priest at Weston Rhyn, who left the area in the 1990s. Today, there are Orthodox divine liturgies given at the Parish Church of St. Oswald every first Saturday of the month by the Greek Orthodox Community in Shrewsbury.

There is a very small Liberal Jewish community within Oswestry, who are served by the Welshpool Jewish Group, over 15 miles (24 km) away. Oswestry's Jewish history is little known, but has had Jewish businesses and families since at least the 1850s. Located within Oswestry Cemetery is the grave of a child Holocaust refugee.

== Healthcare ==
The Robert Jones and Agnes Hunt Orthopaedic Hospital NHS Trust in Gobowen provides elective orthopaedic surgery and musculoskeletal medical services. The hospital is home to the UK's first orthopaedic outpatient centre for British Armed Forces veterans following a fund-raising appeal by the RJAH League of Friends in 2018.

A health centre on Thomas Savin Road contains the Oswestry Minor Injuries Unit, Cambrian Medical Centre and a range of services run by Shropshire Community Health NHS Trust. There are three other GP surgeries within the town, and numerous opticians, pharmacists and dentists.

== Education ==
Oswestry is home to the second oldest 'free' (which in this context means not linked to any ecclesiastical foundation) school in the country, Oswestry School, which was founded in 1407. (The oldest, Winchester College, was founded in 1382). Oswestry School's 15th century site, adjacent to St Oswald's Parish Church, is now a café restaurant. It used to house the Tourist Information Centre, now moved to Castle view.

There are four state primary schools in Oswestry: The Meadows Primary School, Cabin Lane; Woodside Primary School, Gittin Street; Holy Trinity C.E. Primary Academy & Nursery, Beech Grove and Middleton Road; and Our Lady & St. Oswald's Catholic Primary School, Upper Brook Street. There is also an independent co-educational preparatory school in Church Street, Bellan House, which is run by Oswestry School.

Secondary education is provided by both Oswestry School and the state secondary school with academy status: The Marches School, Morda Road.

Further education is provided by The Marches School's Sixth Form and North Shropshire College, which is situated in the town at Shrewsbury Road and at the Walford Campus near Baschurch.

== Local media ==
Regional TV news is provided by BBC West Midlands and ITV Central. Television signals can be received from either The Wrekin or Sutton Coldfield TV transmitters.

Local radio stations are BBC Radio Shropshire on 96.0 FM, Hits Radio Black Country & Shropshire on 103.1 FM and Greatest Hits Radio Black Country & Shropshire on 107.1 FM.

The Border Counties Advertizer and Shropshire Star are the town's local newspapers, the former printed weekly and the latter printed daily. The Oswestry Life Magazine is the town's monthly magazine publication.

== Transport ==
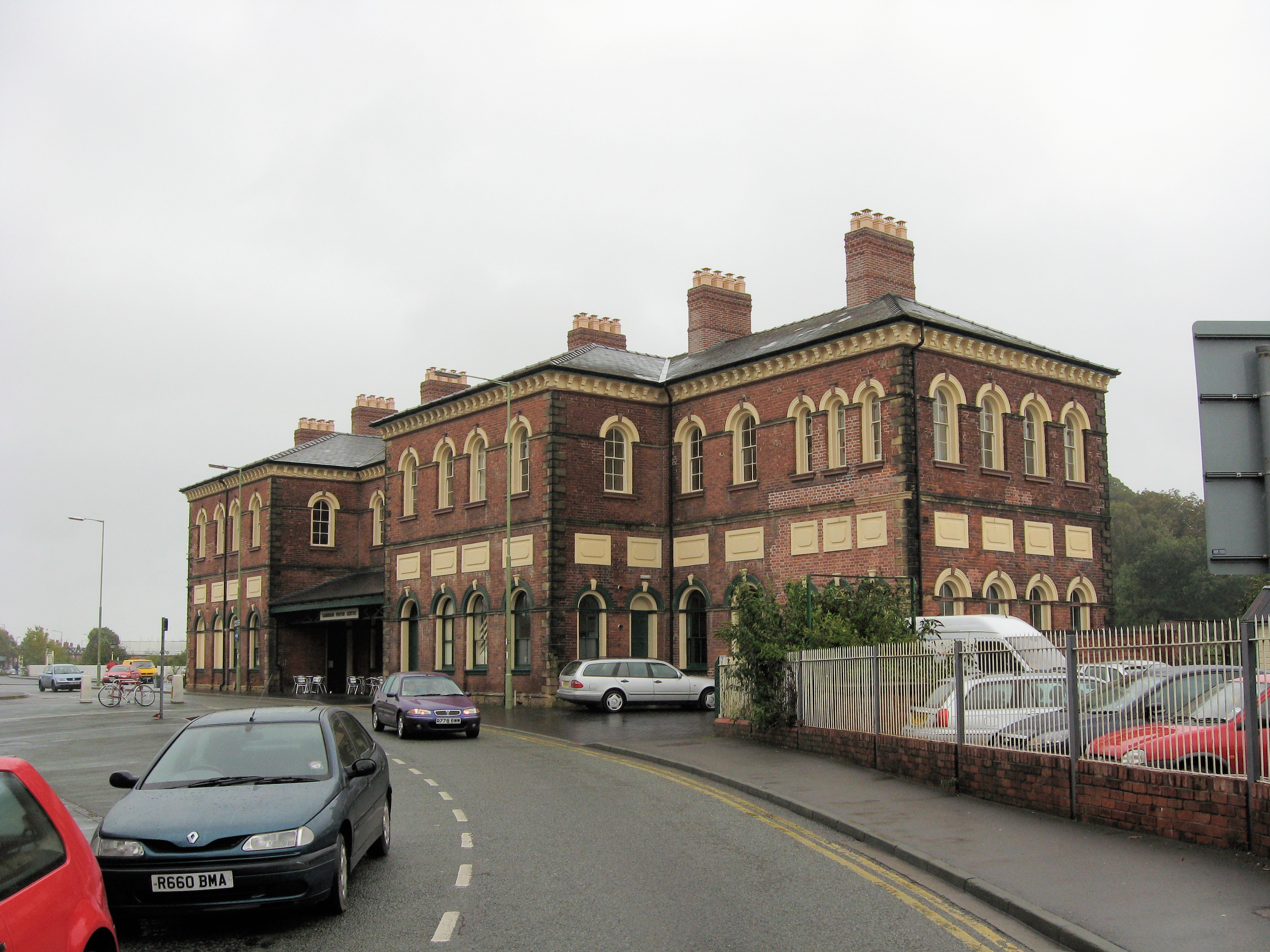
Oswestry – The former station and Cambrian Railways headquarters, later the Cambrian Visitor Centre, October 2008.

Oswestry is at the junction of the A5 with the A483 and A495. The A5 continues from Shrewsbury to the north, passing the town, before turning west near Chirk and entering Wales.

Bus services are operated by Arriva Midlands, Arriva Wales and local independents Tanat Valley Coaches, Lakeside Coaches and Owen's Travelmaster. The town has regular bus routes that link nearby villages and towns including Wrexham, Welshpool, Newtown, Llanfyllin, Ellesmere and Shrewsbury. There is also a Dial-A-Ride minibus service which operates Mon-Fri and a direct bus route between Oswestry and Lake Vyrnwy every Wednesday, both operated by Oswestry Community Action, trading as the Qube.

On 9 November 2023, Oswestry was awarded Coach Friendly accreditation by the Conference for Passenger Transport at a ceremony in the Guildhall on Bailey Head. The award followed an initiative by Oswestry Business Improvement District (BID) to increase the frequency and regularity of coach visits to boost the footfall and income of local shops, cafes, businesses and organisations.

Gobowen railway station is 2 miles (3.2 km) from the northern edge of Oswestry. It has direct services to Birmingham, Cardiff, Chester and North Wales. The original station name board 'Gobowen for Oswestry' is permanently displayed on the station platform.

=== Canals ===
The Llangollen Branch of the Shropshire Union Canal runs from Ellesmere to Llangollen, running 4.5 miles (7 km) east of the town at Hindford and on through Chirk, 6 miles (10 km) north. A navigable section of the partially restored Montgomery Canal, runs from Frankton Junction (connecting to the Llangollen Branch of the Shropshire Union Canal) to Newtown.

=== Historic railways ===
The railway station, once on the main line of the Cambrian Railways, was closed in 1966 as a consequence of the Beeching cuts. Opened in 1840, the section from Whitchurch to Welshpool (Buttington Junction), via Ellesmere, Whittington, Oswestry and Llanymynech, closed on 18 January 1965, leaving only a short branch line from Gobowen to continue to serve Oswestry – but only until 7 November 1966. This former Great Western Railway (GWR) branch had once run into a separate GWR Oswestry terminus, but this has long since disappeared and the land redeveloped as a bus station and supermarket. Trains were re-routed into the main Cambrian station from 7 July 1924.

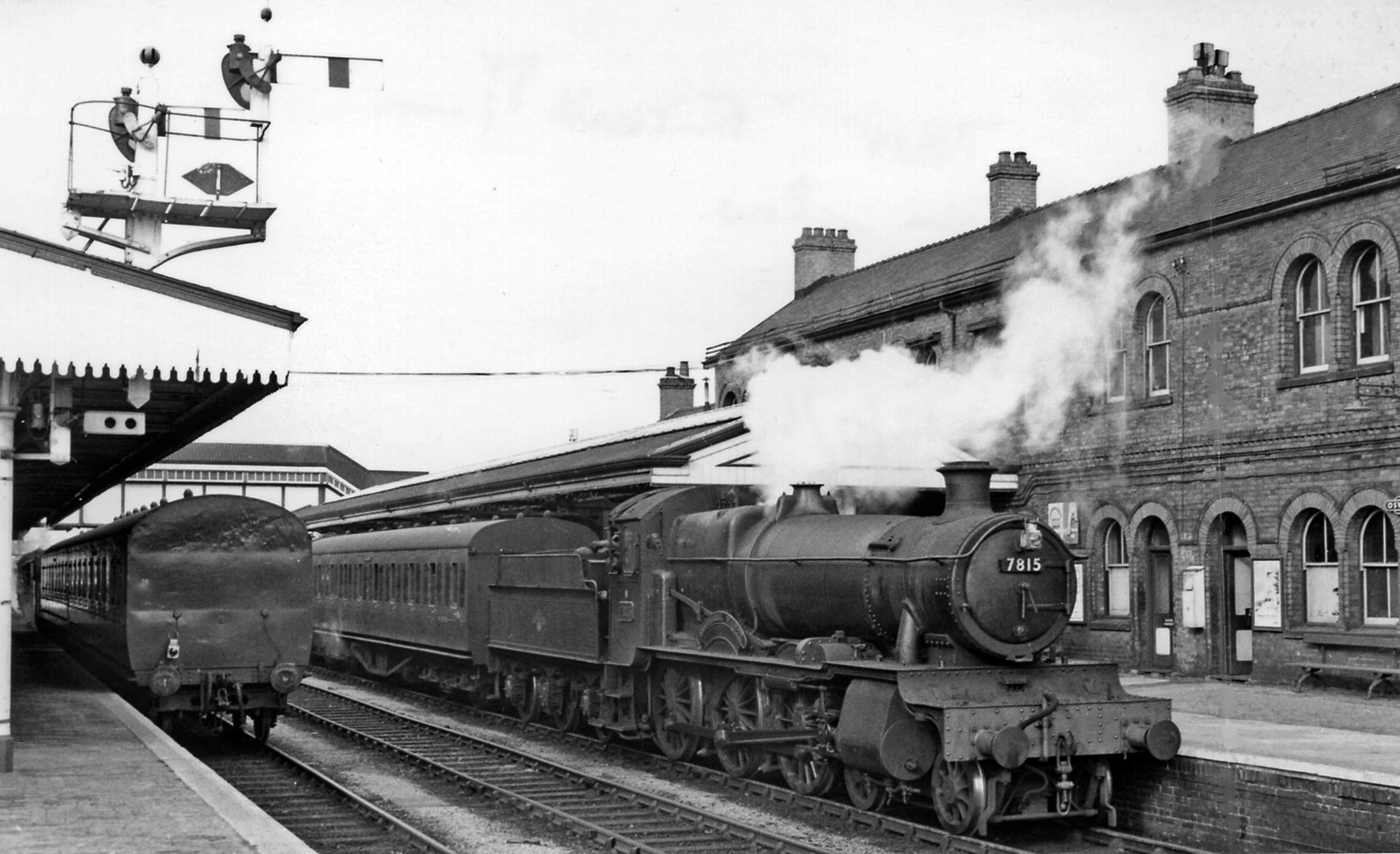
Down stopping train at Oswestry in 1960

The main building of the Cambrian station is still a prominent landmark in the town centre: it once housed the headquarters of the Cambrian Railways company. After restoration, this building was reopened as the Cambrian Visitor Centre in June 2006 but closed on 11 January 2008. It later reopened, and has since evolved into the headquarters of the Cambrian Heritage Railways (CHR) and a small catering establishment known as "Buffers"; other parts of the building have been converted into retail and office units to contribute to the upkeep of the building.

A single railway track still runs through the station, once overgrown and rusting, it has been cleared and repaired and is the subject of an ambitious plan to reopen the line as a steam heritage railway between Oswestry and Llanyblodwel and Pant (to link with the restored Montgomery Canal – see above), and as a sustainable community transport rail link from Oswestry to the National Rail railway station at Gobowen.

By 2013, the main "up" platform at Oswestry station had been reconstructed and some new semaphore signalling installed. The branch-line track-bed from south of Gobowen to Llanyblodwel is now owned by Shropshire Council, who lease the land to CHR, a registered charity. Work advanced to secure the transfer of the existing Transport & Works Act Order (TWAO) from Network Rail to CHR. The aim was for this transfer to be completed by 2014, and for the railway line between Gobowen and Oswestry to be fully re-instated and operational by 2017; however the legal process of the TWAO Unit administering a form of written debate between the proposer and objectors with a guided number of exchanges, was still ongoing in mid 2016. CHR purchase of the final section of the Oswestry to Gobowen railway branch line was completed in April 2016; after other hurdles, such as permissions and finances to reinstate the level crossings on the main A5/A483 Trunk Roads, the TWAO transfer was completed in February 2017.

Immediately to the south of Oswestry Railway Station is the Cambrian Railways Museum; while a short distance to the north are the "listed" Works Bridge and the former Cambrian Railways works, which are now occupied by a variety of local commerce concerns and Oswestry's Community Health Centre and ambulance facility.

== Sport ==
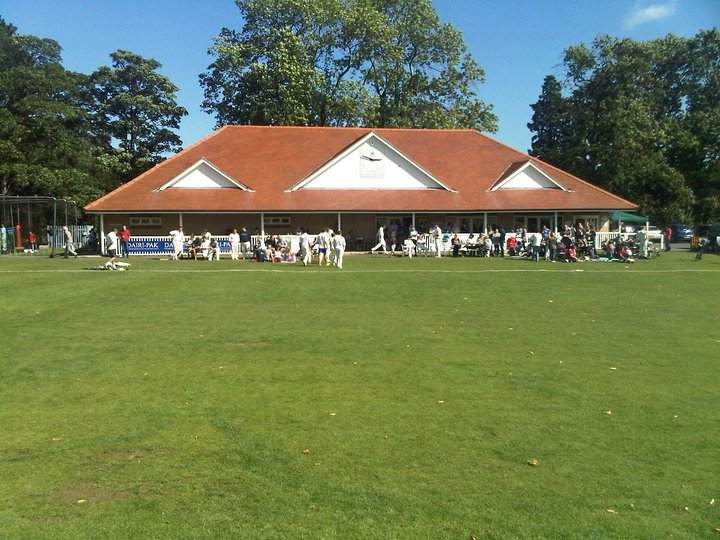
Oswestry Cricket Club's pavilion, August 2010

Oswestry Cricket Club play at Morda Road, Oswestry. The former local football club, Oswestry Town F.C., was one of the few English teams to compete in the League of Wales. It also won the Welsh Cup in 1884, 1901 and 1907. The club was in financial difficulties in 2003 and merged with Total Network Solutions F.C. of Llansantffraid, a village eight miles (13 km) away on the Welsh side of the border. Following the takeover of the club's sponsor in 2006, the club was renamed as The New Saints. They moved to the redeveloped Park Hall Stadium on the outskirts of the town in September 2007. The New Saints or TNS is a full-time-professional football club that play in the Welsh Premier League, which they have won a record twelve times.

F.C. Oswestry Town was formed in 2013 as the successor to Oswestry Lions F.C. and started out in the amateur Mercian Regional League. Success saw the team promoted to North West Counties Football League Division One South and they were on course for further promotion in season 2019–20 when the COVID-19 pandemic struck. Existing financial problems caused by low gate receipts and lack of sponsorship were exacerbated by the decision of The Football Association to cancel and make null and void the 2019–20 season because of the pandemic, and led to the club's demise in July 2020.

== Recreation and leisure ==
From the 1700s to 1848, there was a popular racecourse outside the town. Known as Cyrn-y-Bwch (Welsh for 'the Horns of the Buck'), the site was chosen on this 1,000-foot (300 m) high hilltop because of its location between the Kingdom of England and the Principality of Wales, and the aim was to bring together the local landowners and gentry of Wales and England. Remnants of the old grandstand and figure-of-eight racetrack can still be seen.

Nowadays, Oswestry Race Course is common land, registered under the Commons Act 1899 and the Countryside and Rights of Way Act 2000, with a number of rights of way on the South Common including Offa's Dyke Path and Bridleway. Also designated as a publicly accessible open space and a Wildlife Site in the 1999 Local Plan, it is an area reserved for:

quiet, informal leisure activities and recreation;
the biological diversity of the matrix of heathland, sparse woodland, ponds and ditches; and
the sustainable management and conservation of nature and wildlife.

The site provides extensive views across the surrounding landscape of England and Wales.

The Llanymynech to Chirk Mill section of the Offa's Dyke Path National Trail crosses the common.

== Twin towns ==
Oswestry is twinned with Combs-la-Ville, France, since 1980.

== Notable people ==
=== Arts and media ===
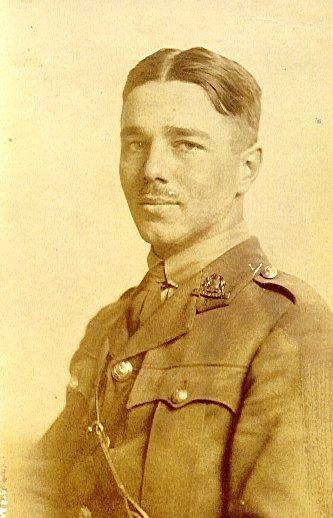
Wilfred Owen

- Guto'r Glyn (c1412-c1493) Welsh bard, resident of the town as appears from poem, In Praise of Oswestry.
- Shirley Brooks (1816–1874) journalist, novelist and editor of Punch, lived locally when training as a solicitor
- William Archibald Spooner (1844–1930) Oxford don, originated Spoonerism, educated at Oswestry School
- John Cadvan Davies (1846-1923), Wesleyan Minister and Archdruid of the Gorsedd under name of Cadvan, died at Oswestry
- Sir Henry Walford Davies (1869 in Oswestry – 1941) composer, Master of the Queen's Music 1934 / 1941
- Wilfred Owen (1893 in Oswestry – 1918) poet and soldier in the first World War
- Mildred Eldridge (1909-1991) artist, mural painter and book illustrator and wife of poet R.S. Thomas, taught at Oswestry Girls' High School and Moreton Hall School up to 1940.
- Ivor Roberts-Jones (1913 in Oswestry – 1996) sculptor, sculpted Sir Winston Churchill in Parliament Square
- Barbara Pym (1913 in Oswestry – 1980) novelist, Booker Prize nominee 1977
- Michael Croft (1922 in Hengoed – 1986) actor, schoolteacher and writer.
- Frank Bough (1933-2020) former television presenter, went to school in Oswestry
- Ian Hunter (born 1939 in Oswestry) songwriter and lead singer of the English rock band Mott the Hoople 1969 / 1974
- Philip Llewellin (1940 in Oswestry – 2005) journalist and writer, went to Oswestry School
- Paul Jerricho (born 1948 in Oswestry) actor, educated at Oswestry School
- Peter Edwards (born 1955) BP Portrait Award-winning artist, went to Oswestry School
- Jesse Armstrong (born 1970 in Oswestry) comedy writer, best known for the Channel 4 sitcom Peep Show, the BBC political satire The Thick of It and the American satirical drama Succession.

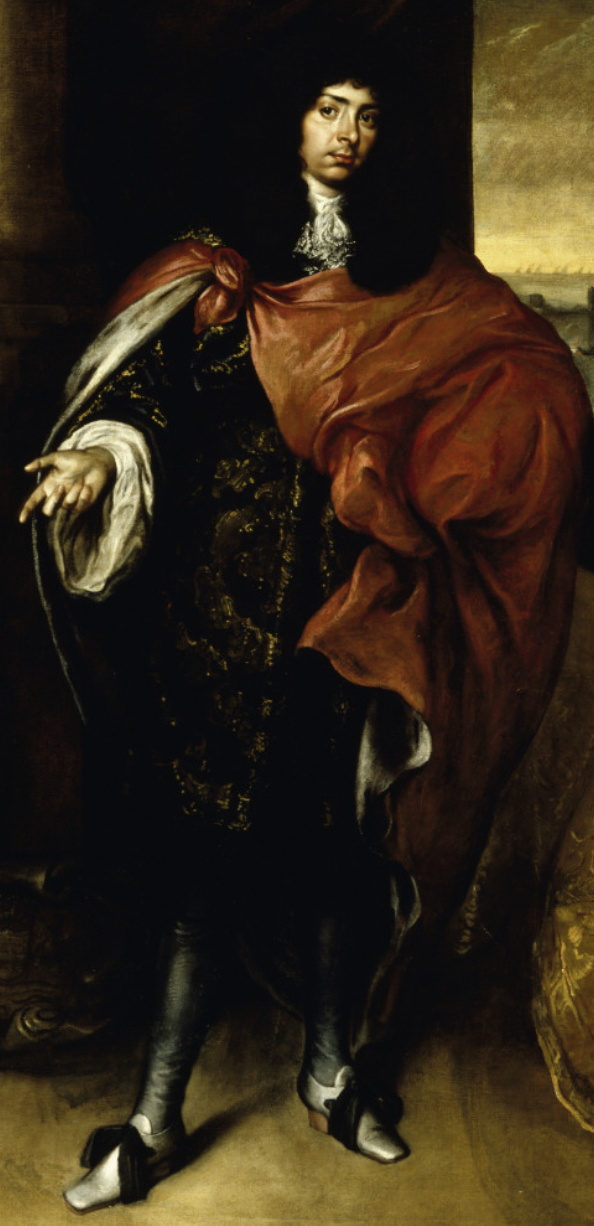
Roger Palmer, 1st Earl of Castlemaine, 1681

=== Public service ===
- Roger Palmer, 1st Earl of Castlemaine (1634–1705) courtier and diplomat, died locally
- Owen Owen (1850–1920) teacher, headmaster and school inspector in Wales
- Harold Whitfield (1886–1956) a British Army soldier and Victoria Cross recipient
- Francis Humphrys (1879–1971) cricketer, colonial administrator and diplomat
- John Lloyd Williams (1894-unknown), World War I flying ace, Chief Constable of Cardiganshire
- Trevor Rees-Jones (born 1968) bodyguard of Diana, Princess of Wales

=== Religion and politics ===
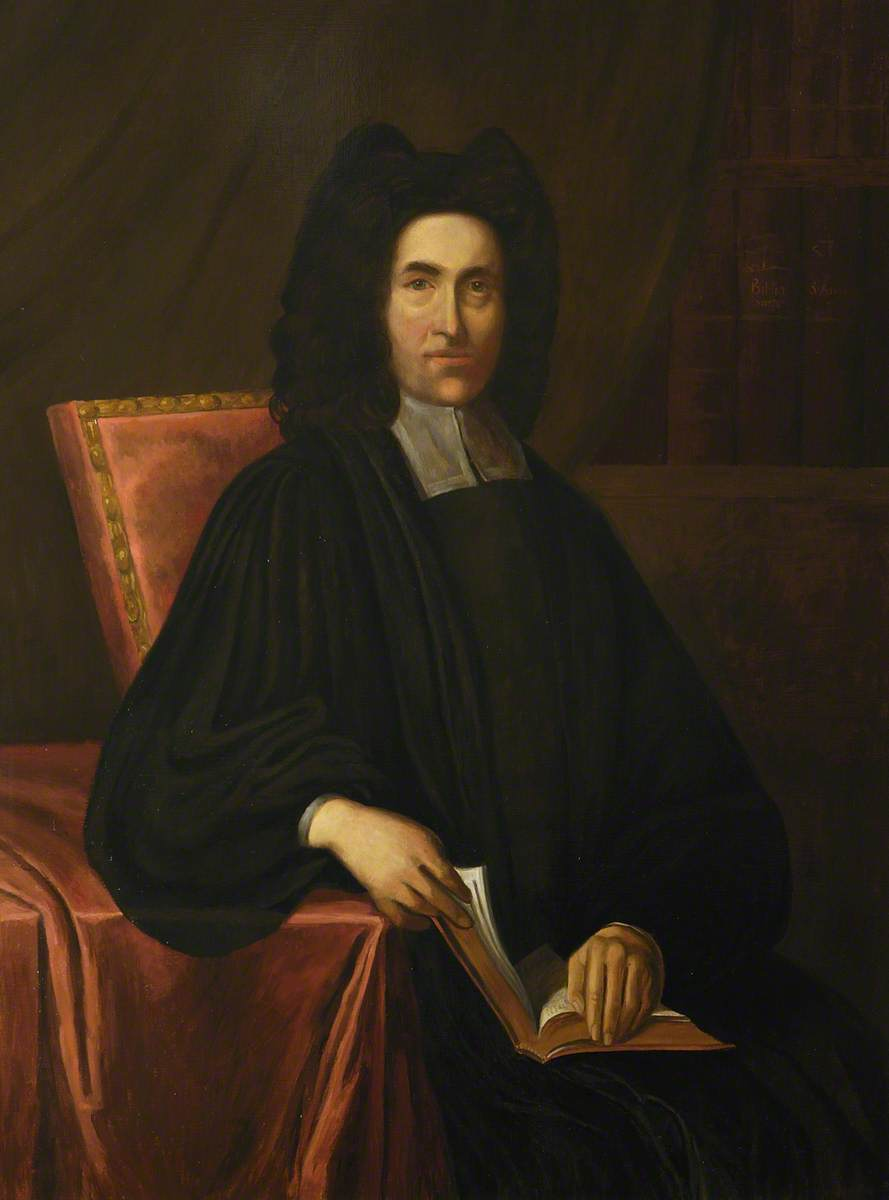
oil painting of Thomas Bray

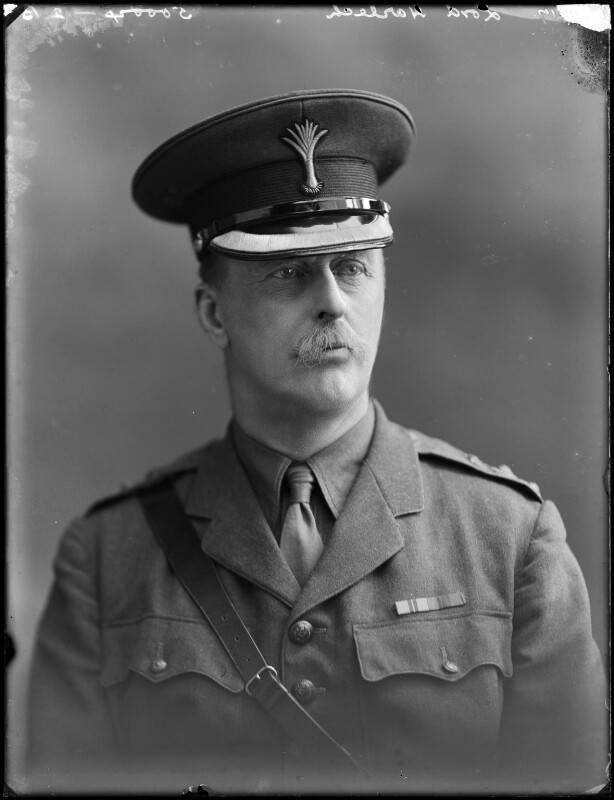
George Ormsby-Gore, 3rd Baron Harlech, 1917.

- William FitzAlan, Lord of Oswestry (1105–1160) nobleman of Breton ancestry, landowner and Marcher lord
- John FitzAlan (1223-1267) (1223–1267) Marcher Lord with lands in the Welsh Marches.
- David Holbache (c.1355 – c.1422) Welsh politician, MP for Shropshire, founded Oswestry School in 1407.
- Robert Ussher, (1592–1642) Provost of Trinity College, Dublin and Bishop of Kildare, buried at Doddleston Chapel, near Oswestry
- Thomas Bray (c.1657–1730) clergyman and abolitionist, went to Oswestry School
- Elias Owen (1833-1899), Welsh cleric and antiquarian, was curate at Holy Trinity, Oswestry 1875 /1876
- Stanley Leighton (1837 – 1901) barrister, landowner, artist, antiquarian and Conservative MP for Oswestry 1885 / 1901
- Francis Jayne (1845-1921), former Bishop of Chester, died in retirement at Oswestry.
- William Henry Fletcher (1851/1852-1926), Church of England clergyman, later Archdeacon of Wrexham, was Vicar of Oswestry 1888/1891.
- George Ormsby-Gore, 3rd Baron Harlech (1855–1938), British soldier and Conservative MP for Oswestry 1901 / 1904
- William Griffith Thomas (1861 in Oswestry – 1924), Anglican cleric and scholar
- William Bridgeman, 1st Viscount Bridgeman (1864–1935) Home Secretary 1922 / 1924 and Conservative MP for Oswestry 1906 / 1929
- Kate Williams Evans (1866-1961), suffragette, died in Oswestry
- Henria Leech Williams (1867–1911), suffragette
- Bertie Leighton (1875–1952), Army officer, landowner and Conservative MP for Oswestry 1929 / 1945
- David Ormsby-Gore, 5th Baron Harlech (1918–1985), diplomat and Conservative MP for Oswestry 1950 / 1961
- John Biffen (1930–2007) Conservative MP for Oswestry 1961–1997
- George Foulkes, Baron Foulkes of Cumnock (born 1942 in Oswestry), former Scottish Labour Co-operative MP, now life peer
- Warren Hawksley (1943 in Oswestry–2018), Conservative politician, MP for The Wrekin, 1979-1987 and Halesowen and Stourbridge 1992-1997.
- Owen Paterson (born 1956), Conservative former politician, was MP for North Shropshire from 1997 until his resignation in 2021

=== Science, medicine and business ===
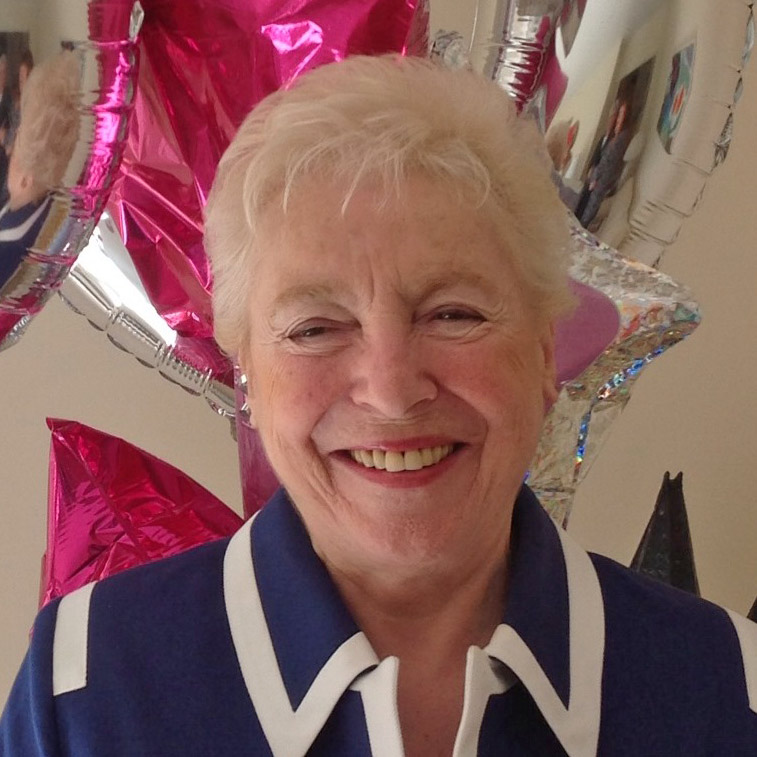
Dame Steve Shirley, 2013

- Thomas Mainwaring Penson (1818 in Oswestry – 1864), surveyor and architect, went to Oswestry School
- Thomas Savin (1826 in Llwynymaen – 1889 in Oswestry), railway engineer, buried Oswestry Cemetery
- Edward Weston (1850 in Oswestry – 1936) chemist, developed electroplating and the Weston cell in the USA
- Northcote W. Thomas (1868 in Oswestry - 1936) British anthropologist and psychical researcher
- Katharine Lloyd-Williams (1896 in Oswestry – 1973) anaesthetist, general practitioner and medical educator
- Gordon Jackson Rees (1918 in Oswestry – 2001) anesthesiologist and a pioneer in pediatric anesthesia
- Dame Steve Shirley (1933-2025) information technology pioneer, businesswoman and philanthropist, Kindertransport child refugee, lived at Oswestry for six years and attended Oswestry Girls' High School.
- Sir Malcolm Walker (born 1946 in Yorkshire) Founded the supermarket chain Iceland in the town in 1970
- Per Lindstrand (born 1948) Swedish aeronautical engineer and pilot, founded Lindstrand Balloons in Oswestry
- Ian Robertson CMG (born 1958 in Oswestry) automotive executive, MD of Land Rover, now on the Board of BMW Group

=== Sports ===
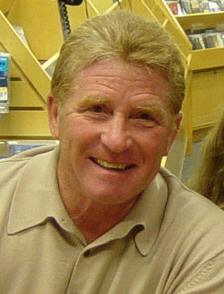
Alan Ball Jr., 2007

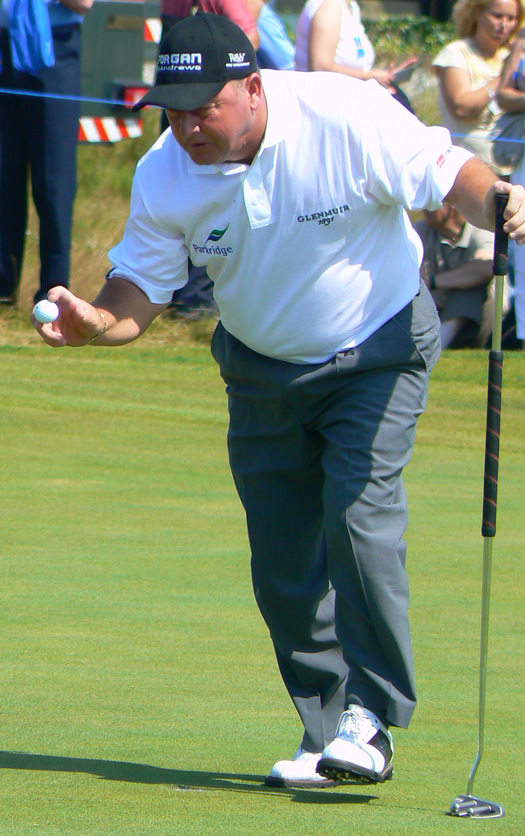
Ian Woosnam, 2009

- Alfred Payne (1849 in Oswestry – 1927) cricketer for the Marylebone Cricket Club
- Di Jones (1867 in Trefonen – 1902) Welsh international footballer, 340 club caps for Bolton Wanderers F.C. and Manchester City F.C.
- Maurice Parry (1877–1935) footballer, who played 240 games, mainly for Liverpool F.C. and 16 for Wales
- Charlie Morris (1880 in Oswestry – 1952) footballer, 277 club caps for Derby County F.C. & 27 for Wales
- George Wynn (1886 in Treflach – 1966) Welsh footballer, played over 200 games and 11 for Wales
- Herbie Roberts (1905 in Oswestry – 1944) footballer, 297 club caps for Arsenal F.C.
- Jack Hughes (1912–1991), footballer, played over 260 games, most for Chesterfield F.C.
- George Antonio (1914-1997) - footballer, brought up in Oswestry from age three, 203 club caps notably for Stoke City, later returned to manage Oswestry Town.
- Harry Cooke (1919 in Oswestry - 1992) footballer, 228 club caps mostly for Luton Town
- Dick Sale (1919-1987), first-class cricketer, was headmaster of Oswestry School 1962-1966
- Harry Weetman (1920 in Oswestry - 1972) golfer
- Alan Ball, Sr (1924-1982) football player and publican; player-manager at Oswestry Town. father of Alan Ball, Jr (1945-2007)
- Fred Morris (1929 in Oswestry – 1998) footballer, 350 club caps, mainly for Walsall F.C.
- Peter Wall (1944-2024) footballer, 350 club caps mainly for Crystal Palace.lived locally on retirement.
- Alan Ball, Jr (1945-2007) footballer, played 833 games, incl. 72 for England attended Oswestry Boys' High School; son of Alan Ball, Sr.
- Andy Lloyd (1956 in Oswestry) England test cricketer and captain of Warwickshire CCC
- Carleton Leonard (born 1958), former footballer who played 298 games for Shrewsbury Town F.C.
- Ian Woosnam (born 1958 in Oswestry) Welsh professional golfer
- Mike Galloway (born 1965), football coach and former player who played over 320 games and one for Scotland
- Carl Griffiths (born 1971 in Oswestry) retired footballer, 334 club caps beginning at Shrewsbury Town F.C.
- Darren Ryan (born 1972 in Oswestry) former footballer, over 300 club caps; now trains youngsters at Wolves
- Paul Evans (born 1974 in Oswestry) retired footballer, 475 club caps beginning at Shrewsbury Town F.C.
- Boaz Myhill (born 1982) football goalkeeper, 381 club caps, mostly for Hull City F.C. and 19 for Wales
- Amy Hughes (born 1987) marathon runner, now a local sports therapist
- Matt Done (born 1988 in Oswestry) footballer, 512 club caps, now works at Port Vale F.C.

== See also ==
- Listed buildings in Oswestry
- Battle of Oswestry - Civil War
