= Edward Hurst Davies =

Welsh quarry manager and owner

- Born: 1855; Corris
- Died: 1927
- Known for: Hendreddu quarry, Hendre-Ddu Tramway

Edward Hurst Davies (1855–1927) was a Welsh quarry manager and owner.

== Early life ==
Davies was born in Corris in 1855. His father Edward Davies (1822–1874) was Edmund Buckley's quarry supervisor, who had re-opened Minllyn slate quarry at Dinas Mawddwy in 1864, then oversaw the opening of the Hendreddu quarry near Aberangell. Edward Hurst joined his father as a quarryman at Hendreddu when it opened.

== Quarrying ==
In 1876, Edmund Buckley sold Hendreddu Quarry to Dennis Bradwell. Bradwell appointed Davies as the manager of Hendreddu in 1880. Bradwell had a difficult relationship with the quarry workers and disagreed with Davies. Davies left the quarry around 1886 and went to work as the mine agent at the newly found Gartheiniog quarry two miles away.

In 1868, Frederick Walton moved to the Cwmllecoediog Estate near Aberangell, which was owned by his father. Walton was the inventor of Linoleum and had made a large fortune from it. He leased the land around Maesygamfa Farm, east of Gartheiniog, which included an abandoned Broad Vein quarry. He partnered with Davies and they opened Maesygamfa Quarry with Walton providing the capital and Davies leading the work.

In 1900, the partnership between Davies and Walton was dissolved, and Davies took over as sole owner of Maesygamfa. The quarry closed in 1909, and Davies relinquished the lease to the quarry in December 1911.

By this time, Hendreddu quarry was being run by Dennis Bradwell's brother Jacob. Jacob Bradwell died in 1908 and Davies purchased the quarry and the Hendre-Ddu Tramway which linked the quarry to the Mawddwy Railway at Aberangell railway station. The tramway also connected to the Gartheiniog and Maesygamfa quarries. Davies restarted production at Hendreddu quarry in early 1914 though the outbreak of the First World War saw many quarrymen leave the district, and the quarry closed again in late 1915.

In 1919, Davies sold Hendreddu quarry and the tramway to William Clayton Russon. Russon was one of the founders of the National Welsh Slate Quarries company which purchased the quarry and tramway from him. The company appointed Davies as their quarry manager. This company was beset by fraud and was declared bankrupt in 1921, and Davies retired from quarry management that year.

== Civic duties ==
In 1898, Davies was elected to the Unified School Board of Mallwyd and Llanymawddwy, the Dolgelley Board of Guardians and became the chairman of the newly formed Municipal Council of Dinas Mawddwy. He was a member of the Mallwyd Urban District Council in 1899 and 1900.

== Personal life ==
In 1879, Davies married Margaret Evans and they lived at the Black Lion Hotel, Upper Gwnnws near Strata Florida. Their first to children, May (b. 1881) and Annie (b. 1883) were born there, while their first son, John Evan (b. 1885) was born at Ystradyfodwg near Glamorgan. Their third daughter Mathilda was born in 1885, and their last child Iorwerth was born on 16th. April 1893; Iorwerth was a pilot in the Royal Flying Corps during the First World War and was killed in a plane crash at RAF Fairlop in August 1918.

In 1888 the family moved to Aberangell, where Edward Hurst worked. In 1895 they moved into Brynderwen, a large house the family had built for them.

In 1926, Edward Hurst Davies moved to live with his daughter Mathilda in Bridgend. He died in July 1927.
