= Hendreddu quarry =

Slate quarry in Wales

Hendreddu
- Location in Gwynedd
- Location: near Aberangell, Merioneth (now Gwynedd), Wales, UK; 52.696923011381976°N 3.7776537170937354°W grid reference SH 768 102
- Products: Slate
- Type: Quarry
- Opened: 1868
- Active: 1868–1908; 1914–1916; 1920–1932; 1937–1941
- Closed: 1941

Hendreddu quarry was a slate quarry about three miles west of Aberangell in Merioneth (now Gwynedd), North Wales, near Nant Hendreddu on the slopes of Mynydd Hendre-ddu. The quarry worked the Narrow Vein, the highest-quality slate vein in the Abercorris Group. For the majority of the quarry's existence, the Hendre Ddu Tramway was owned by the same company that owned the quarry, and the two were run as a single enterprise.

== History ==
=== Early exploration ===
In 1856, a "take note" (permission to explore for minerals) was granted by Sir Edmund Buckley to search for slate on Mynydd Hendre-ddu. It was taken by David Hughes of Pen Pentre, Aberangell. Hughes developed at least one open pit where the narrow vein reached the surface.

=== Commercial expansion ===
Hughes' exploration proved there was high-quality slate near Nant Hendreddu. In 1864, Buckley took over the nascent quarry and began more serious work. In August 1868, the Hendreddu Slate Quarry Company was formed, managed by Edward Davies from Minllyn quarry. In 1870, a long incline was laid from the pit level down to the bottom of Hendreddu Valley, and in 1872, work started on a long tunnel from the bottom of the incline northwest to meet the vein underground. The tunnel was completed in April 1873, and mining of the slate began.

=== Mill and transport ===
A substantial mill was built east of the adit and equipped with machinery dragged from Aberangell station. A terrace of cottages was built for married quarrymen, and a barracks at the quarry was for single men. A narrow-gauge tramway was built in 1874 to allow the transportation of slabs from the quarry to Aberangell.

=== The Bradwell brothers ===
In 1876, Buckley was declared bankrupt and forced to sell most of his estate, including the tramway and quarry, which were purchased by Dennis Bradwell. Bradwell was the mayor of Congleton and the owner of a silk mill at Leek. He was joined by his younger brother Jacob, who took over the running of the quarry. There was significant industrial conflict between the Bradwells and the workers during the 1880s. Jacob remained in charge of the quarry until his death in 1908.

=== Edward Hurst Davies ===
Edward Hurst Davies purchased the quarry after the death of Jacob Bradwell. Davies had been the second manager at Hendreddu, before joining nearby Gartheiniog quarry. He co-founded Maesygamfa quarry with Frederick Walton in 1886. Davies reopened Hendreddu quarry in 1914, shortly after Maesygamfa had closed. He continued limited slab production until 1916, then closed it once more. After the war, Davies sold the quarry and tramway to William Clayton Russon.

=== National Welsh Slate Quarries ===
After the war, Davies sold the quarry to National Welsh Slate Quarries Ltd. (NWSQ), a new company founded by Charles Fitzherbert Bill, the son of Charles Bill. The company purchased the quarry and tramway from Russon in 1919. They raised more than £90,000 (equivalent to £3,244,628 in 2021) through the sale of stock and refurbished the quarry.

Production restarted in 1920, but NWSQs was a fraudulent scheme and closed down at the end of 1921.

=== Hendre-ddu Slate Quarries ===
The quarry continued operating after the failure of NWSQ. In 1922, C.F. Bill and William Bowley formed a new company, Hendre-ddu Slate Quarries Ltd., to take over the quarry from the receiver. The new company specialised in slabs for electrical installations.

There was a large collapse of several underground chambers in 1925, but work continued in the remaining chambers. In 1927, the company was reorganized, Bill left, and Bowley became chairman. Bowley appointed Herbert Harold Disley as the quarry manager. The Great Depression caused a drop in demand for slate, and the quarry closed in 1932.

=== T. Glyn Williams ===
The quarry remained closed until it was purchased by T. Glyn Williams in 1937. Born in 1913, Williams was the son of T.O Williams who had been the manager at several local quarries including Braichgoch, Abercorris, Aberllefenni and Wrysgan. T. Glyn reopened the quarry with limited success. At the outbreak of the Second World War the workforce was reduced as men joined the military. Williams closed the quarry in 1941.
