= Herbert Harold Disley =

Welsh quarry manager (born 1900)

- Born: 1900; Corris, Wales
- Died: 1972 (aged 71–72)
- Occupation: Quarry manager

Herbert Harold Disley (1900–1972) was a Welsh quarry manager.

== Early life ==
Disley was born in Corris, a village in Gwynedd, in 1900. His father, Henry Herbert Disley (1872–1954), was the manager of the Aberllfenni slate quarries.

== Career ==
In 1915, Disley was working at the Magnus enamelling mill, then part of the Aberllefenni quarry complex.

In 1927, Disley was appointed the quarry manager at Hendreddu slate quarry, near Aberangell. The quarry and its associated Hendre Ddu Tramway had been sold by Edward Hurst Davies immediately after the First World War, and in 1922, Hendre-ddu Slate Quarries Ltd. purchased them. Disley worked at Hendreddu until 1932, when the quarry closed and he moved with his family to Bow, London where he worked at Matthews & Co. slate mill.

== Civic work ==
In 1926, Disley was the chairman of the Dovey Fisheries Board in charge of the Afon Dyfi. He was also an elder of the Upper Montgomery Welsh Presbytery.

== Family ==
Disley married Marie in 1928, and their son, John Disley (1928–2016) was a long-distance runner who won a bronze medal in the 3000 metres steeplechase at the 1952 Olympic Games, and co-founded the London Marathon. His brother, John W. Disley, was the station agent at Aberangell in the late 1930s.

Herbert Harold Disley died in 1972 in Gobowen.
