= Dennis Bradwell =

British Businessman and mayor of Congleton in 1870s (1828 – 1897)

- Born: 1828; Congleton, England
- Died: 1897; Congleton
- Occupation: Skill Mill owner

Dennis Bradwell (1828 – 1897), was a British businessman who was mayor of Congleton in the 1870s. He owned silk mills in Cheshire and Staffordshire and a slate quarry in Mid Wales.

== Early life ==
Bradwell was born in 1828, the son of Dennis Bradwell of Bradwell, Derbyshire.

== Career ==
In the 1850s, Bradwell co-owned the London Silk Mill in Leek, Staffordshire with William Bullock, and the Danebridge Mill in Congleton with his younger brother Jacob. Bullock, from Macclesfield, leased the Minllyn slate quarry at Dinas Mawddwy in Mid Wales from Sir Edmund Buckley in 1864. In 1875, the Bradwell brothers sold the Danebridge Mill. The following year, Buckley was declared bankrupt and Bullock suggested that the Bradwells buy the Hendreddu Slate quarry. Ownership of the quarry included the Hendre Ddu Tramway which linked the quarry to Aberangell railway station. The Bradwells formed the Hendre Ddu Slate Quarry Co. Ltd. and purchased the quarry. The brothers ran the quarry until 1884, when Jacob took over as sole owner.

Bradwell was a Justice of the Peace, Town Magistrate and, from 1875 to 1878, the Mayor of Congleton.
