= John Disley =

Welsh steeplechaser (1928–2016)

John Disley CBE
- Born: 20 November 1928; Corris, Wales
- Died: 8 February 2016 (aged 87)
- Education: Oswestry Boys High School; Loughborough College
- Father: Herbert Harold Disley
- Sports career
- Nationality: Welsh
- Sport: Athletics
- Event: steeplechase
- Club: London Athletic Club
Medal record
Men's athletics
Representing Great Britain
Olympic Games
Bronze medal – third place	1952 Helsinki	3000 m s'chase

John Ivor Disley CBE (20 November 1928 – 8 February 2016) was a Welsh athlete. He competed mainly in the 3000 metres steeplechase before co-founding the London Marathon and becoming active in sports promotion and administration.

== Biography ==
Disley was born in Corris, a village in Gwynedd. His father, Herbert Harold Disley was the manager of the Hendreddu Slate Quarry in Aberangell. He attended Oswestry Boys High School in Oswestry before studying at Loughborough College.

Disley became the British steeplechase champion after winning the British AAA Championships title at the 1952 AAA Championships. Shortly afterwards he represented the Great Britain team at the 1952 Olympic Games in Helsinki, in the 3000 metres steeplechase, where he won the bronze medal.

Disley set five British records in the steeplechase and four at two miles. He also set Welsh records at six different distances. He also broke the record for the traverse of the Welsh 3000 foot peaks.

Disley represented Wales twice at the Commonwealth Games, competing in 1954 and 1958, but did not win a medal either time. He went on to win two more AAA titles at the 1955 AAA Championships and the 1957 AAA Championships.

Disley's job was teaching PE at Isleworth Grammar School in south-west London. In 1957, Disley became Chief Instructor, and later Committee Chairman - a position he held until 1966.

Disley was one of the founders of the London Marathon, first held in 1981, after running the New York Marathon in 1979 and being very impressed by its success. He was president of the London Marathon Charitable Trust. Disley became vice-chairman of the UK Sports Council in 1974, a post he held until 1982. He was the leading pioneer of orienteering in the UK. He also competed in the 1966 World Orienteering Championships. John was the Co-founder of Oswestry Olympians Athletics Club in Oswestry along with Doug Morris.

Disley was a member of the Welsh Sports Hall of Fame and was President of the Snowdonia Society. He was appointed Commander of the Order of the British Empire (CBE) in the 1979 New Year Honours.

== John Disley Lifetime Achievement Award ==
The John Disley Lifetime Achievement Award is given in Disley's honour. Recipients of the award include:

- Paula Radcliffe, 2015
- Hugh Jones, 2016
- Brendan Foster, 2017
- Liz McColgan, 2023
- Tanni Grey-Thompson, 2024
