= Buckley baronets =

Extinct baronetcy in the Baronetage of the United Kingdom

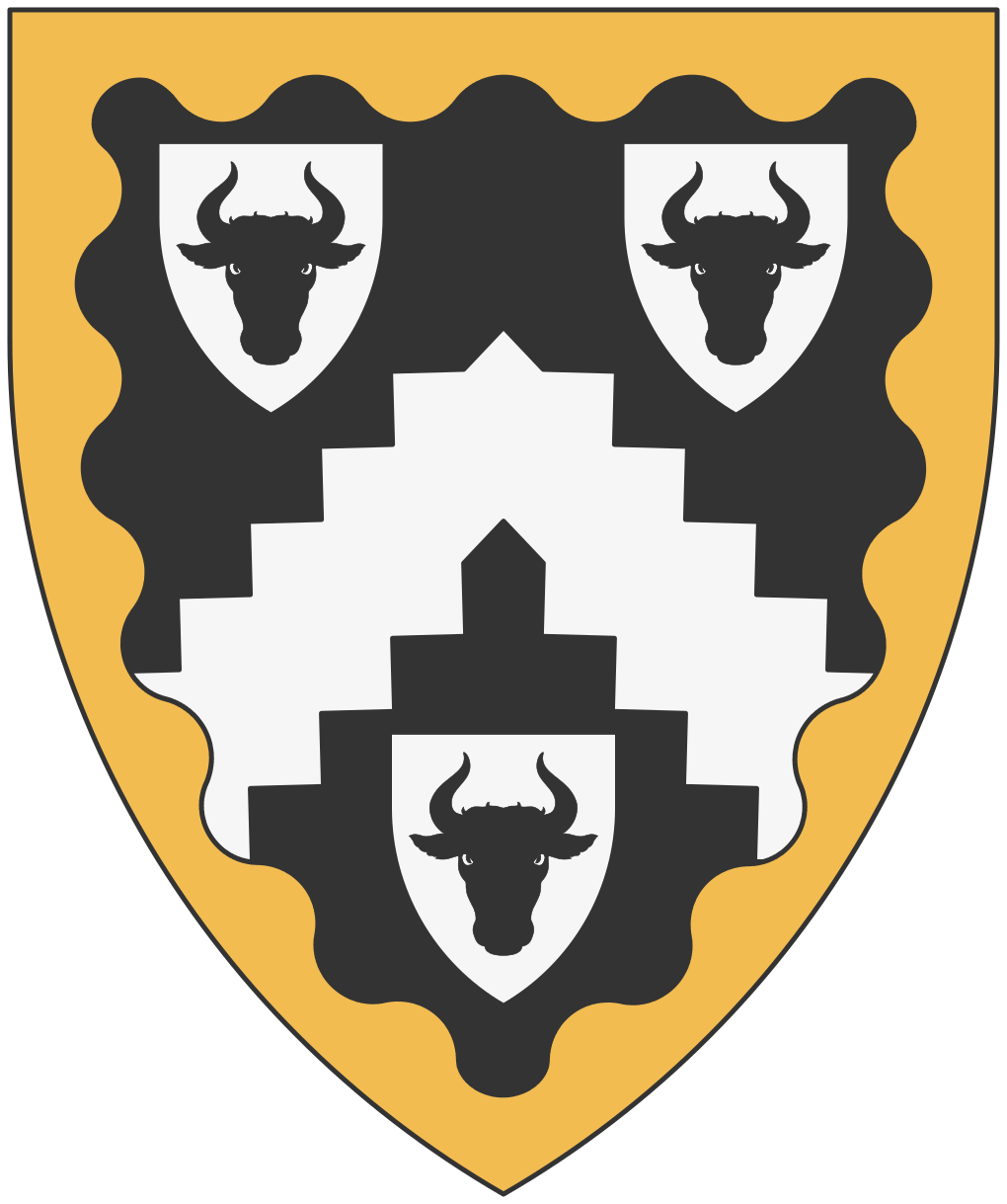
Arms of Buckley of Mawddwy

The Buckley Baronetcy, of Mawddwy in the County of Merioneth, was created in the Baronetage of the United Kingdom in 1868 for Edmund Buckley, a British landowner and Conservative Party politician. He owned the Hendre Ddu Slate and Slab Company and served from 1865 to 1878 as one of the two members of parliament (MPs) for the borough of Newcastle-under-Lyme.

His son, also named Edmund Buckley, became the second Baronet on his father's death. The title became extinct in 1919 on the death of the second Baronet.

== Buckley baronets, of Mawddwy, Merioneth (1868) ==
- Sir Edmund Buckley, 1st Baronet (1834–1910)
- Sir Edmund Buckley, 2nd Baronet (1861–1919)
