= Edmund Buckley =

Edmund Buckley may refer to:

- Edmund Buckley (politician, born 1780) (1780–1867), Member of Parliament (MP) for Newcastle-under-Lyme 1841–1842
- Sir Edmund Buckley, 1st Baronet (1834–1910), MP for Newcastle-under-Lyme 1865–1878
- Sir Edmund Buckley, 2nd Baronet (1861–1919)

== See also ==
- Buckley (surname)
