= Sir Edmund Buckley, 1st Baronet =

British landowner and Conservative politician

Edmund Buckley
- Born: Edmund Peck; 16 April 1834
- Died: 21 March 1910 (aged 75)

Sir Edmund Buckley, 1st Baronet (16 April 1834 – 21 March 1910) was a British landowner and Conservative politician who sat in the House of Commons from 1865 to 1878.

== Early life ==
Buckley was born as Edmund Peck, the illegitimate son of Edmund Buckley of Ardwick in Manchester. He assumed the name of Buckley by Royal Licence in 1864 and inherited considerable estates in Lancashire and Wales including the estate at Dinas Mawddwy.

== Industrial career ==
Buckley became involved in slate quarrying on his Dinas Mawddwy estate in the 1860s. In 1856, his father issued a "take note" (permission to explore for minerals) to search for slate on Mynydd Hendre-ddu, about 4 miles west of Aberangell. It was taken by David Hughes of Pen Pentre, Aberangell. Hughes developed at least one open pit where the Narrow Vein came to the surface.

In 1864, he purchased and re-opened Minllyn quarry. To get the slate to market he built the Mawddwy Railway to connect to the Newtown and Machynlleth Railway line, at Cemmes Road. The younger Buckley also expanded the Hendreddu quarry that his father had started, and built the Hendre-Ddu Tramway in 1874 to connect the quarry to the Mawddwy Railway at Aberangell railway station.

A slump in the slate industry together with the failure of some of his other businesses led to his financial collapse in 1876, and he had to declare bankruptcy. Despite having inherited a vast fortune, he had so over-invested both at Dinas Mawddwy and elsewhere that the entire inheritance was gone; indeed Buckley was £500,000 (equivalent to £59,409,391 in 2023) in debt, an almost unbelievable amount in the 1870s. Buckley had to sell off most of his estates to pay his debts. One asset he did retain was the Mawddwy Railway – but with no capital to spend on it.

== Civic career ==
He was a Deputy Lieutenant and J.P. for Merionethshire.

At the 1865 general election Buckley was elected Member of Parliament for Newcastle-under-Lyme, the same seat his father had previously held. He was created a baronet on 11 December 1868. At the 1868 general election he was re-elected for Newcastle-under-Lyme and held the seat until 1878, when he resigned from the Commons by taking the Chiltern Hundreds.

In 1872 he built a lavish Victorian gothic mansion at Dinas Mawddwy called "Y Plas". In 1873 he built a hotel, reputedly the oldest reinforced concrete building in Europe, which was called the Buckley Arms hotel.

== Personal life ==
Buckley died at the age of 75.

Buckley married Sarah Rees, daughter of William Rees of Tonn near Llandovery, Wales in 1860. Sarah died in 1883 and Buckley married her cousin Sarah Mysie Burton (née Jenkins), daughter of Evan Jenkins, Rector of Loughor in 1885 His son by his first marriage, also called Edmund Buckley, born in 1861, inherited the Baronetcy on his father's death.

Parliament of the United Kingdom
Preceded by William Jackson; William Murray	Member of Parliament for Newcastle-under-Lyme; 1865–1878; With: William Shepherd Allen	Succeeded by Samuel Rathbone Edge; William Shepherd Allen
Baronetage of the United Kingdom
New creation	Baronet ( of Mawddwy, Merioneth); 1868–1910	Succeeded by Edmund Buckley
