= William Clayton Russon =

English industrialist (born 1872)

- Born: 1872; Birmingham, England
- Died: Unknown
- Occupations: Businessman, industrialist
- Known for: Owner of cycle businesses in Birmingham and slate and timber company in Wales
- Spouse: Gertrude James (m. 1894)
- Children: Three
- Parent(s): Frederick and Sarah-Ann Russon

William Clayton Russon (born 1872) was an English businessman and industrialist.

== Early life ==
Russon was born in 1872, in Birmingham to Frederick and Sarah-Ann Russon.

== Career ==
=== Cycle businesses in Birmingham ===
In 1892, Russon formed Lloyd and Sons at Grove Lane, Smethwick, in partnership with William Clayton Lloyd. This company was renamed the Claremont Cycle Manufacturing Company in 1896 and was floated as a public company. It closed in 1896, and Russon and Lloyd started another cycle company, the Colossal Cycle Company. Russon created the Main Wheeleries Company, also manufacturing bicycles, in 1902. Both of these companies closed in 1905, with Russon forced to declare bankruptcy.

In 1912, Sarah-Ann Russon, William's mother, founded the Ryland Manufacturing Co in Birmingham and William was employed there. The company manufactured wooden goods such as chairs, doors and car bodies. In 1916, Sarah-Ann retired and the company was taken over by William and his new business partner, Roland Morgan, and renamed Ryland (Joinery) Ltd. They leased a woodland and sawmill near Aberystwyth to secure a supply of timber.

=== Slate and timber businesses in Wales ===
In 1919, Russon and Morgan started the British Timber Plantation Company which took over the Welsh forestry operations and added new woodlands near Llanfyllin. As well as supplying timber to Ryland, they sold pit props to collieries. Later that year, Russon purchased the Hendreddu slate quarry north of Aberystwyth. He then sold the quarry and its associated Hendre-Ddu Tramway to the newly formed National Welsh Slate Quarries Ltd.

Russon used the money from the sale of Hendreddu to purchase the Llangynog slate quarry in the Berwyn mountains. This was sold in 1920 to Standard Housing Company a newly formed company which also purchased Gartheiniog slate quarry about 2 miles away from Hendreddu quarry and also connected to the Hendre-Ddu Tramway. Gartheiniog quarry had been purchased from Sidney Victor Wallis who later married Russon's daughter. As part of the sale of Llangynog quarry, Russon became a major shareholder in Standard Housing Company.

The Standard Housing and National Welsh Slate Quarries companies were deeply intertwined, with Russon working for and holding shares in both. Both companies failed within months of each other in 1921.

Russon was declared bankrupt in 1922, but not before he had secured ownership of Gartheiniog and signed it over to his wife. She remained the owner of the quarry, with William playing a major role in its leasing and management. They sold the quarry in 1935 to a subsidiary of S. Bowley and Son.

== Personal life ==
Russon married Gertrude James on 15 August 1894. Her family owned the James Cycle Co based at Gough Road, Edgbaston.

Their first son, also called William Clayton Russon was born on 30 June 1895. Their daughter Gertrude Irene Russon was born in 1899. Their second son, James Baron Russon, born in 1904.
