= Cemmaes railway station =

Former railway station in Gwynedd, Wales

Coordinates: 52.6408°N 3.7221°W

Cemmaes

General information
- Location: Cemmaes, Gwynedd; Wales
- Platforms: 1

Other information
- Status: Disused

History
- Original company: Mawddwy Railway
- Pre-grouping: Cambrian Railways
- Post-grouping: Great Western Railway

Key dates
- 30 September 1867: Station opens
- 17 April 1901: Station closes to passengers
- 31 July 1911: Station reopens
- 1 January 1931: Station closes to passengers
Location

Cemmaes railway station was an intermediate railway station on the Mawddwy Railway which ran from Cemmaes Road to Dinas Mawddy in the Welsh county of Merionethshire. The station was opened by the Mawddwy Railway in 1867 and closed to all goods traffic in 1908. The railway re-opened in 1911 with all services run by the Cambrian Railways. It was amalgamated into the Great Western Railway in 1923 as part of the grouping of British railways, and remained open to passenger traffic until 1931.

== History ==
The Mawddwy Railway was first opened in 1867, however it was closed to passenger traffic in 1901, and closed to all goods traffic in 1908. It reopened on 31 July 1911 as a light railway system, as a result of the support of several local councils. The railway was incorporated, as part of the Cambrian Railways, into the Great Western Railway during the Grouping of 1923. The railway closed its passenger services in 1931, although the line continued to remain open for freight traffic until 1952.

The station served local passenger needs for the village of Cemmaes.

| Preceding station | Disused railways | Following station |
|---|---|---|
| Cemmes Road; Line and station closed | Cambrian Railways; Mawddwy Railway | Aberangell; Line and station closed |
