= Meirion Mill =

Active Welsh woollen mill in Dinas Mawddwy, Gwynedd

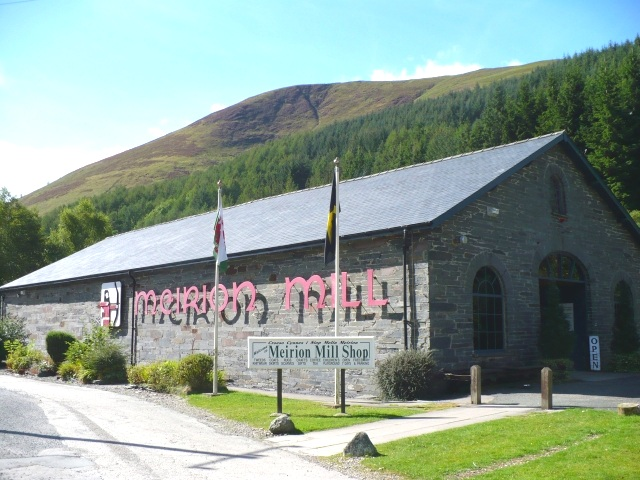
Meirion Mill in 2007

Meirion Mill is a woollen mill at Dinas Mawddwy in Wales. It operates as a tourist attraction. The mill is located on the site of the northern terminus of the defunct Mawddwy Railway.

== History ==
=== Slate warehouse ===
The large, slate-built building that Meirion Mill now occupies was originally built in 1867 to serve as a warehouse for the nearby Minllyn slate quarry. Slate products from the quarry were stored in the warehouse, waiting to be shipped by trains on the Mawddwy Railway to Cemmaes Road and beyond. During the First World War, the warehouse was converted into a sawmill for local timber production, and remained in use for timber into the 1920s.

=== Woollen Mill ===
After a period of disuse, the building was taken over in 1946 by a consortium of local farmers who converted it into a woollen mill. Their principal product was sheep's wool, and by joining together they could produce high-value woven products from the fleeces. They incorporated as The Wool Society Ltd. in 1947. This enterprise was initially successful, but by 1952 it was taken over by the Welsh Agricultural Organisation Society. They continued to run it, but by the early 1960s the business was failing, and the Society sought an operator for the mill.

The Turner Brothers of Bridlington, a manufacturer of bedspreads, took over as the operator of the mill in 1963. They upgraded the machinery and sought to purchase the business outright, but the Society declined to sell it. Turner Brothers then abandoned their use of the mill. In 1966, Cheshire industrialist Raymond Street took over.

=== Meirion Mill ===
Street invested both time and money into the mill, further modernising its equipment, and expanding the business. He founded the Welsh Weavers Association and in 1973 ran the first Welsh Fair at Llandrindod Wells. He adopted the name Meirion Mill for his business.

Street saw an opportunity to expand the operation at Dinas Mawddwy beyond weaving. He opened the Mill as a tourist attraction and sales venue. By 1974 the Mill was attracting 100,000 visitors annually. Looking to expand the attraction further, Street planned to open a railway museum on the station site. This plan rapidly expanded to include a narrow-gauge railway, which opened in 1975 as the Meirion Mill Railway. This only operated until Easter of 1977. Street also rented space to local craft workers who could sell their products at the Mill and demonstrate their crafts as additional tourist attractions, these included weaving and pottery.

During the 1980s, sales of woven products became the primary business at the Mill, with the local crafts gradually being phased out, and active weaving stopping.

Today the tourist shop sells a range of woven items, crafts and homeware. In addition to the shop, the old Mawddwy Railway building now also contains a café. At the site many relics of the old railway still remain.
