= Foel Dinas =

Mountain in Wales

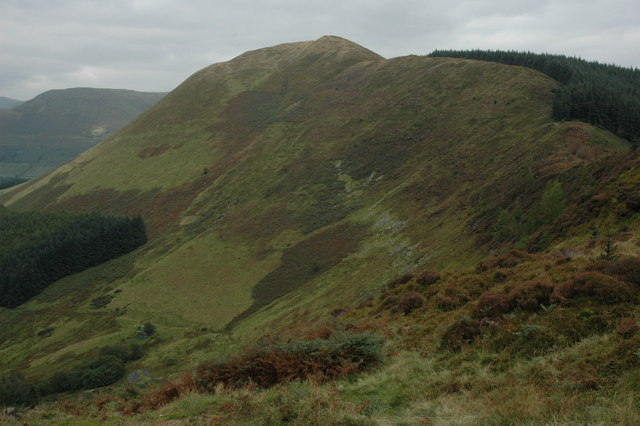
- Foel Dinas from the west

Highest point
- Elevation: 472.2 m (1,549 ft)
- Prominence: 135 m (443 ft)
- Coordinates: 52.71409988°N 3.71497004°W

Naming
- English translation: City mountain
- Language of name: Welsh

Geography
- Location: Snowdonia, Wales
- Parent range: Cadair Idris
- OS grid: SH 8424 1431
- Topo map: OS Explorer OL23

Foel Dinas is a mountain in Wales. It is the north-westernmost peak of the Dyfi Hills and sits above the town of Dinas Mawddwy.

In the 1870s its eastern and northern slopes were planted with trees by Sir Edmund Buckley, the lord of the manor of Mawddwy. On the northern flank is Llyn Foel Dinas, a lake which was dammed to form a reservoir, providing the water supply to Buckley's manor house in Dinas Mawddwy. The southern shoulder of the mountain was the location of Minllyn quarry from the 1790s to 1925.
