= Abercegir =

Coordinates: 52.600°N 3.767°W

- Location within Powys
- OS grid reference: SH804017
- Community: Glantwymyn
- Principal area: Powys
- Preserved county: Powys
- Country: Wales
- Sovereign state: United Kingdom
- Post town: MACHYNLLETH
- Postcode district: SY20
- Dialling code: 01650
- Police: Dyfed-Powys
- Fire: Mid and West Wales
- Ambulance: Welsh
- UK Parliament: Montgomeryshire and Glyndŵr

Abercegir (Welsh pronunciation) is a small rural village in Powys, Wales.

It lies approximately 4 miles east of the town of Machynlleth and is 81 miles (131 km) from Cardiff and 172 miles (277 km) from London.
