= Moel y Ffridd =

Highest point
- Elevation: 342 m (1,122 ft)
- Coordinates: 52°41′28″N 3°43′42″W

Naming
- Language of name: Welsh

Geography
- Location: Snowdonia, Wales
- Parent range: Cadair Idris
- Topo map: OS Explorer OL23

Moel y Ffridd (also known as Foel y Ffridd) is a mountain in Wales. It lies north-west of the village of Aberangell and west of Mallwyd and is one of the Dyfi Hills.
