= Dinas Mawddwy =

Town in Wales

Coordinates: 52.719°N 3.691°W

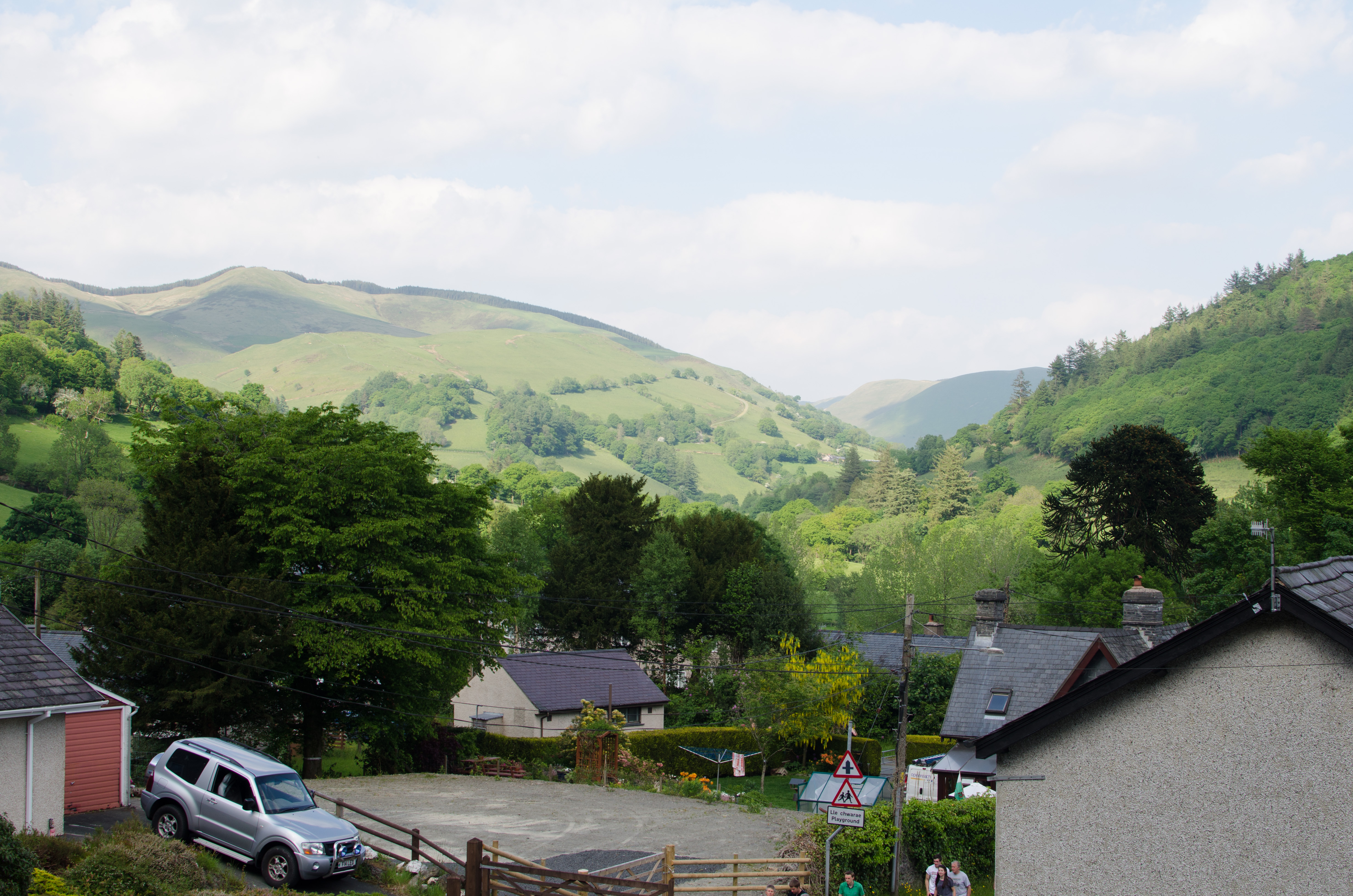
- A view across the town of Dinas Mawddwy

- Location within Gwynedd
- Population: 622 (2011)
- OS grid reference: SH857148
- Community: Mawddwy
- Principal area: Gwynedd
- Country: Wales
- Sovereign state: United Kingdom
- Post town: MACHYNLLETH
- Postcode district: SY20
- Dialling code: 01650
- Police: North Wales
- Fire: North Wales
- Ambulance: Welsh
- UK Parliament: Dwyfor Meirionnydd
- Senedd Cymru – Welsh Parliament: Gwynedd Maldwyn

Dinas Mawddwy (Welsh pronunciation: [ˈdiːnas mau̯ðʊɨ̯];) is a village in the community of Mawddwy in south-east Gwynedd, north Wales. It lies within the Snowdonia National Park, but just to the east of the main A470, and consequently many visitors pass the town by. Its population is roughly 600. The town marks the junction of the unclassified road to Llanuwchllyn which climbs up through the mountains to cross Bwlch y Groes at its highest point, the second highest road pass in Wales. This minor road also provides the closest access to the mountain Aran Fawddwy, the highest in southern Snowdonia, and is the nearest settlement to Craig Cywarch.

== Geography ==
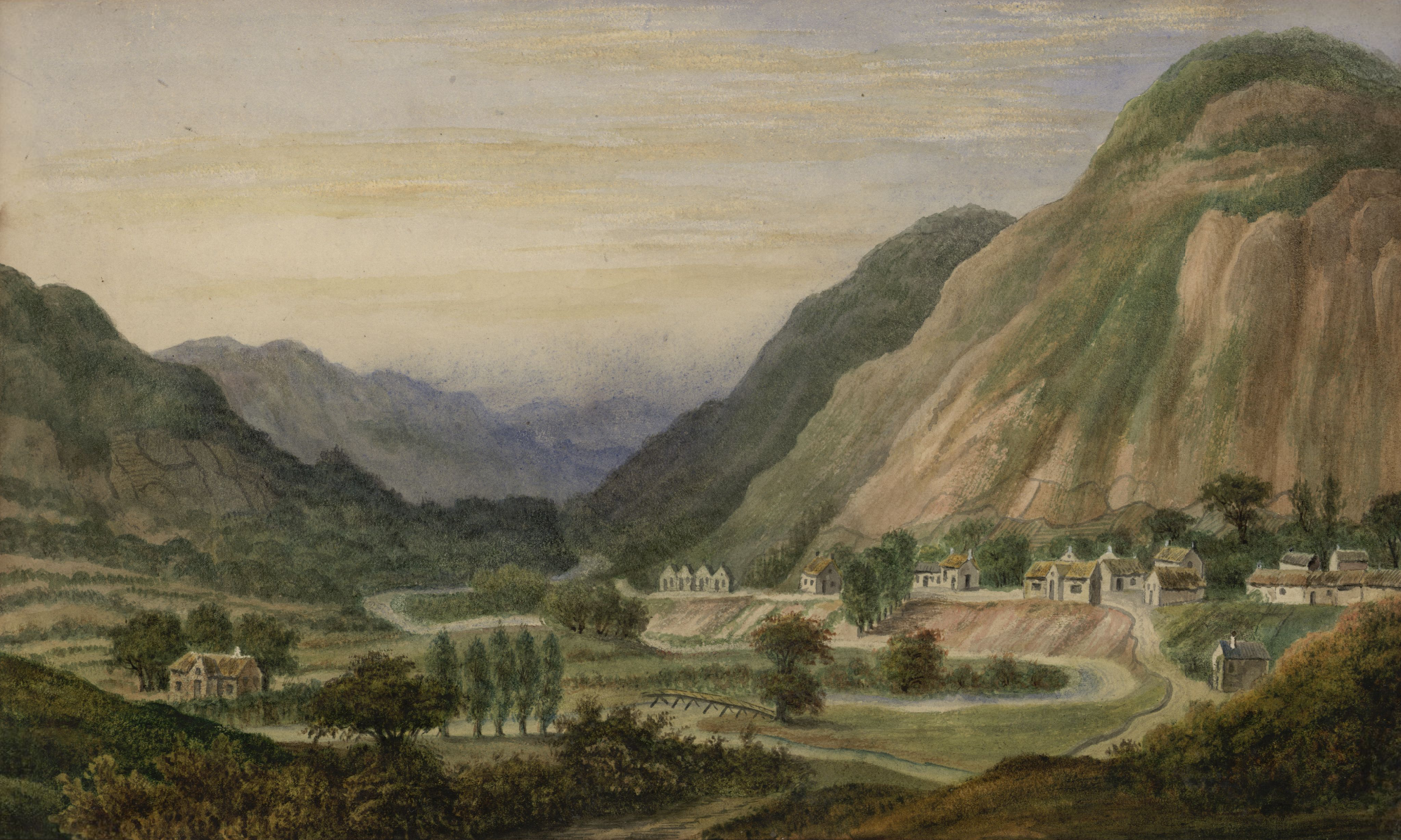
Dinas Mawddwy, looking south with Moel Dinas on the right, painted in 1830 by Alphonse Dousseau.

Dinas Mawddwy stands at the confluence of three rivers. Afon Cywarch flows from the mountains to the north and Afon Cerist flows from the west, both joining the River Dyfi here. The Dyfi flows south to Glantwymyn where it turns west to head past Machynlleth to the Irish Sea. The mountains to the north are the Aran Fawddwy range of high, rocky peaks. To the south and the west stand the Dyfi Hills, dominated by Maesglase 3 miles (4.8 km) west of the town. Dinas Mawddwy is dominated by Foel Dinas which looms high over the valley's west side.

Dinas Mawddwy lies within the Dyfi Biosphere, designated by UNESCO in 2009.

== Early history ==
=== Iron Age ===
There are thought to be two Iron Age fortifications in the immediate vicinity of Dinas Mawddwy. One is on the top of Moel Benddin, where a low depression forms the supposed site. The second fortification was in C'aer-bryn field, to the south of the Buckley Arms Hotel, which still had stonework in place in the late 18th century.

=== Medieval period ===
The Ancient borough of Mawddwy was the only remaining part of the Kingdom of Powys still ruled by members of the native "royal family" (of Powys Wenwynwyn) after 1309. On the division of the realm in 1293, Mawddwy had been awarded to William de la Pole (of Mawddwy) and his descendants. The ruling family in Mawddwy would expire in the male line in 1414.

Dinas Mawddwy was the seat of the borough of Mawddwy and received its charter in 1394; it retained that status until 1886. The Mayor of Mawddwy had the power to try offenders within the borough and punish them in the stocks, and to grant licenses to public houses, although this latter power ended in 1872.

=== The Red Bandits of Mawddwy ===
In the 16th century, the Mawddwy area was home to a band of highway robbers and bandits named the 'Gwylliaid Cochion Mawddwy' or 'Gwylliaid y Dugoed'. The Gwylliaid were supposedly the dregs of society, who came to the Dinas Mawddwy area having been excommunicated from their own areas. Some were hanged and others were exiled from the area forever. In 1555 two brothers pleaded to be pardoned by the Baron Owain, and his rejection of the plea enraged the Gwylliaid. They were intent on revenge and one night, while the Baron travelled home from Montgomeryshire, the Gwylliaid set traps on the road and shot arrows at the baron and his company. His body was found with thirty arrows attached to it.

== Lords of Mawddwy ==
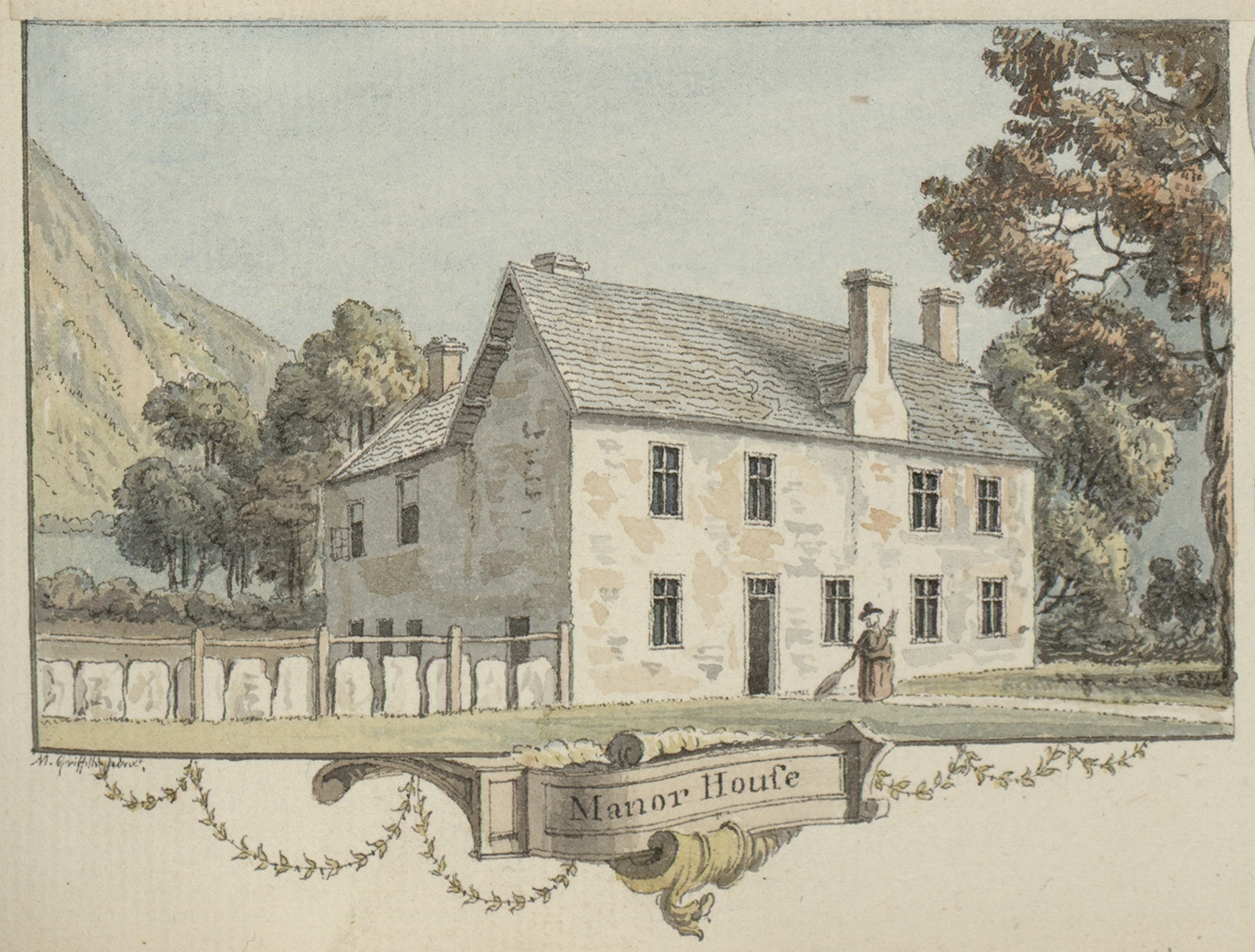
Y Plas, the medieval manor house of the Lords of Mawddwy, seen in 1780

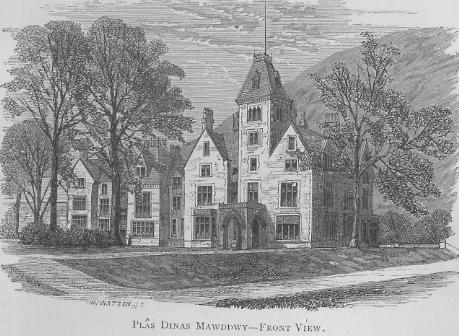
Plas-yn-Dinas, built by Sir Edmund Buckley to replace Y Plas in 1868

From around 1500, the Lordship of Mawddwy was held by members of the Mytton family. In 1734, John Mytton, then the Lord of Mawddwy, donated a black marble font to the church at Mallwyd. The family held the lordship until 1831, when it was sold by "Mad Jack" Mytton to John Bird. In 1856. Bird in turn sold the title and the substantial estate in and around Dinas Mawddwy to Sir Edmund Buckley, a rich industrialist from Ardwick near Manchester. Buckley passed the title and estate to his son Sir Edmund Buckley, 1st Baronet in 1864. In turn they passed to Sir Edmund Buckley, 2nd Baronet in 1910. Sir Edmund's son died fighting at Gallipoli in 1915, he died in 1919.

The Lord of Mawddwy was empowered to hold a court leet. This medieval judicial system continued in active use as late as 1914. In 1891 the following notice of the twice annual court was posted in Dolgellau:

NOTICE is HEREBY GIVEN that the COURT LEET Court Baron and View of Frankpledge of and for the above Manor and for the City and Borough of Dinas Mawddwy for Michaelmas 1891 will be held at the Buckley Arms Hotel Dinas Mawddwy on Thursday the 19th day of November next at One o clock in the Afternoon where and when all Jurors Constables Homagers and others who owe suit and service are required to attend WR DAVIES, Dolgelley, Oct. 31st 1891

== Administrative history ==
In 1898, the Municipal Council of Dinas Mawddwy was formed, with Edward Hurst Davies as its first chairman.

It is now covered by the Mawddwy Community Council (Cyngor Cymuned Mawddwy)

== Transport and industry ==
Dinas Mawddwy was served by the standard gauge Mawddwy Railway which connected with the Cambrian Railways at Cemmes Road railway station. It was the northern terminus of the railway, which was built to serve the slate quarries at Minllyn and Aberangell and to provide passenger services along the upper Dyfi valley. The railway opened in 1867 and ran passenger services until 1 January 1931. It closed completely in September 1950 after heavy flooding of the River Dyfi damaged the railway bridge north of Cemmes Road railway station. The line was officially closed on 1 July 1951. The track was lifted early in 1952.

Between 1975 and 1977, the 2 ft (610 mm) gauge Meirion Mill Railway ran from Meirion Mill on the site of Dinas Mawddwy station for about a mile south towards Aberangell.

== Notable residents ==
- Robert Vaughn (1836–1918), a Welsh immigrant to the US state of Montana, rancher, farmer and businessman
- Gwyndaf Evans, 1996 British Rally Championship winner
- and his son Elfyn Evans, winner of the World Rally Championship 2026, as well as winner of both Wales WRC Rally GB 2017 and Swedish WRC Rally 2020.
