= Craig Cywarch =

Crag in Gwynedd, Wales

Coordinates: 52.7525°N 3.7205°W

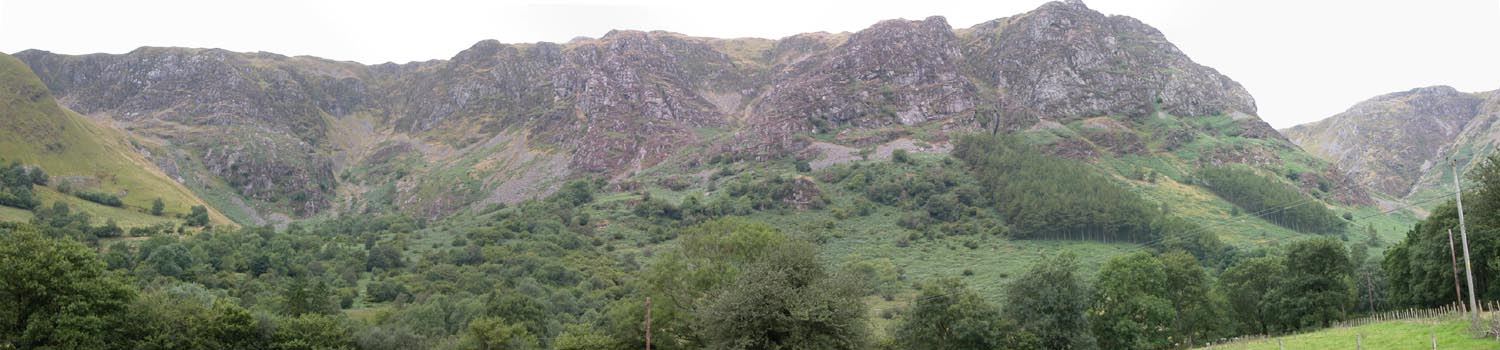
The crag

Craig Cywarch is an extensive crag looming above Cwm Cywarch. The nearest village is Dinas Mawddwy on the A470.

Climbing routes on the various buttresses range from E2 to V Diff. Access paths can be rather overgrown and even finding the bottom of the routes can be rather difficult.

== See also ==
- Aran Fawddwy
