= Mawddwy Railway =

Short railway line running through mid Wales

Overview
- Locale: Wales

History
- Opened: 1867
- Temporarily closed: 1908
- Re-opened, operated by Cambrian Railways: 1911
- Absorbed into the Great Western Railway: 1922
- Closed: 1952

Technical
- Line length: 6.6 mi (10.6 km)
- Track gauge: 4 ft 8 1/2 in (1,435 mm) standard gauge

The Mawddwy Railway was a rural line in the Dyfi Valley in mid-Wales that connected Dinas Mawddwy with a junction at Cemmaes Road railway station on the Newtown and Machynlleth Railway section of the Cambrian Railways.

Despite being only 6 miles 63 chains (10.9 km) long, there were three intermediate stations at Cemmaes, Aberangell (where it linked to the Hendre-Ddu Tramway) and Mallwyd.

== History ==
=== Slate quarrying: 1790s – 1865 ===
Three parallel veins of Ordovician slate run through mid Wales. These veins surface at three locations – around Abergynolwyn in the west, surrounding Corris, and at their easternmost in the district around Dinas Mawddwy. Each of these locations has been a centre for slate quarrying, Corris being the largest producer of the three.

Slate quarrying at Dinas Mawddwy dates back to at least 1793. In 1839, the Minllen Slate and Slab Company was formed to work the quarry, but it went bankrupt in 1844. The main quarry was Minllyn quarry, a Narrow Vein quarry about a mile south of the town. This was connected to the Mawddwy Railway's Dinas Mawddwy station by a 1/2-mile-long (0.80 km) 2 ft 2 in (660 mm)-gauge incline. In 1856, a prosperous mill owner from Ardwick, Sir Edmund Buckley purchased the Lordship of Dinas Mawddwy and with it a large estate covering 12,000 acres of the town and local area. Buckley was reputed to be the "richest man in Manchester" and was for one term the Conservative MP for Newcastle-under-Lyme. Sir Edmund's eldest son, also called Edmund Buckley and later made a baronet took over the Dinas Mawddwy estate and title in 1864.

The younger Sir Edmund Buckley spent lavishly on his new estate. He built a huge neo-Gothic house at Dinas Mawddwy called Y Plas ("The Palace"). He also wanted to build an industrial empire of his own, and purchased the Minllyn quarry. To get the slate to market, he decided to build a railway connecting Dinas Mawddwy with the Newtown and Machynlleth Railway line, at Cemmes Road – its name anglicised so that it would not be confused by passengers with the Mawddwy Railway's nearby Cemmaes station.

=== Construction and opening: 1865 – 1876 ===
Mowddwy Railway Act 1865
- Act of Parliament
- Parliament of the United Kingdom
- Long title: An Act for making a Railway from the Cemmes Road Station on the Cambrian Railway to near the Town of Dinas Mowddwy; and for other Purposes.
- Citation: 28 & 29 Vict. c. cccvi

Dates
- Royal assent: 5 July 1865

Text of statute as originally enacted

The Mawddwy Railway was constructed as a public railway, authorised under an act of Parliament, the Mowddwy Railway Act 1865 (28 & 29 Vict. c. cccvi). It was originally intended to be built to the same 2 ft 3 in (686 mm) gauge as the nearby Talyllyn Railway, but this was changed to standard gauge before construction began. Construction was contracted to Richard Samuel France, who started work in 1866. The railway opened on Monday 30 September 1867. The first locomotive to work trains was Mawddwy which had previously been owned by France and used during construction. This was joined in 1868 by a second Manning Wardle locomotive, named Disraeli. Slate traffic and agricultural produce made up the bulk of the traffic on the railway, but from the earliest days it was clear that the railway company was struggling financially.

In 1876, a serious blow landed when Sir Edmund Buckley unexpectedly declared bankruptcy. Despite inheriting a vast fortune, he had so over-invested both at Dinas Mawddwy and elsewhere that the entire inheritance was gone; indeed Buckley was £500,000 (equivalent to £49,881,799 in 2025) in debt, an almost unbelievable amount in the 1870s. Buckley had to sell off most of his estates to pay his debts. One asset he did retain was the Mawddwy Railway, but now he had no capital to spend on it.

=== First operating period: 1877 – 1908 ===
In 1874, the Hendre Ddu Tramway was opened to connect Buckley's Hendreddu quarry to the Mawddwy Railway at Aberangell. Further quarries were connected to the tramway – Maes-y-gamfa quarry in 1886, Gartheiniog quarry in 1887 and finally Tal-y-Mierin in 1913.

By the early 1890s, the infrastructure of the Mawddwy Railway was considerably worn and Buckley had no funds to repair it. The slate industry declined during the late 1890s and early 1900s, and the railway continued to run down as there were no capital funds and barely any profit. Passenger services were suspended "pending repairs" in April 1901. Buckley offered the entire railway to the Cambrian Railways for £12,000, but the Cambrian did not have the capital reserves to make the purchase. The Cambrian's chairman Charles Sherwood Denniss suggested that Buckley apply for a light railway order under the Light Railways Act 1896 and run the line as a tourist attraction. A single daily freight train continued to run until April 1908, at which point all services were abandoned due to the poor state of the track and locomotives.

=== Revival and Cambrian takeover: 1909 – 1918 ===
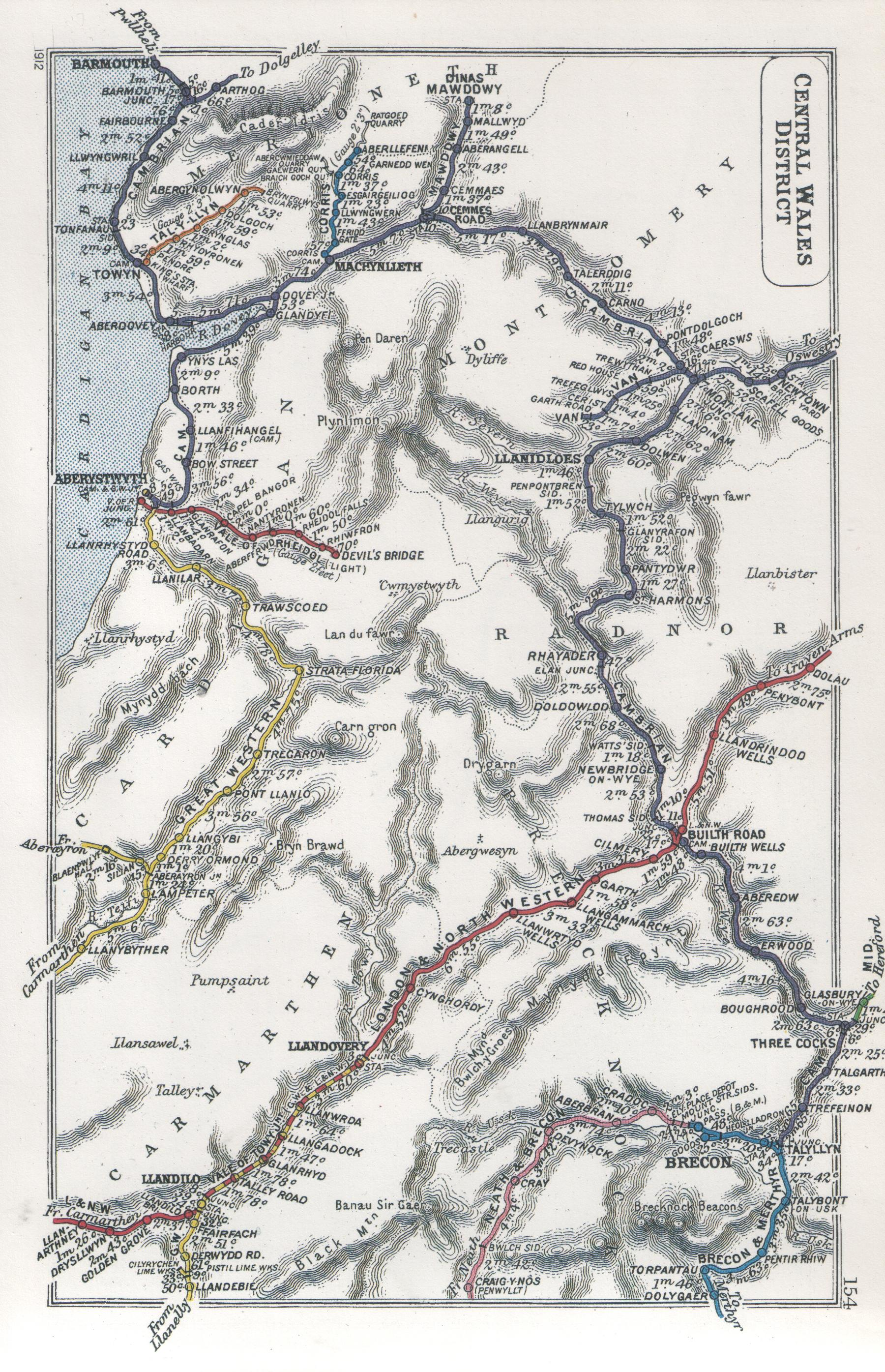
A 1912 Railway Clearing House map showing railways in Central Wales, including the Mawddwy Railway (top centre)

The local community, led by David Davies, grandson of industrialist David Davies and local MP, called a series of meetings with the aim of reviving the railway. He proposed forming a new company to revive it as a light railway. the Mawddwy Railway (Light Railway) Order 1910 (Cd. 5143) was granted, permitting the railway company to construct a "new" light railway on the disused trackbed. Davies negotiated an agreement with the Cambrian Railways that would keep the railway in the nominal control of the Mawddwy Railway Company, but the Cambrian would fund the rebuilding of the railway, run all services, and keep the majority of the revenue.

Reconstruction commenced immediately under the direction of G. C. MacDonald, the Engineer of the Cambrian Railways. The track was relaid in heavier rail and several bridges were rebuilt or strengthened. On 29 July 1911 the railway reopened under the chairmanship of David Davies, with trains operated by the Cambrian Railways using its own rolling stock. The rolling stock of the old Mawddwy Railway was either scrapped, or repaired for use elsewhere on the Cambrian system.

=== Grouping and Nationalisation: 1919 – 1949 ===
The advent of World War I dealt a significant blow to the railway. Several local slate quarries closed and tourist traffic fell considerably, although timber and munitions traffic for the war effort offset this somewhat. After the war ended, the railway continued to struggle. In 1923 the Great Western Railway (GWR) took control of the Mawddwy Railway as part of the grouping of British railways. The GWR introduced buses to the Dyfi valley, many taken over from the Corris Railway. These competed with the passenger services of the railway, leading to the end of passenger services from 1 January 1931.

=== Closure: 1950 – 1952 ===
Freight services continued through World War II, although the local slate industry continued to decline. The Hendre-Ddu Tramway closed in 1939, though part of the tramway continued in use to bring timber from the forests west of Aberangell. After the war, the Mawddwy line became part of British Railways at nationalisation. In September 1950 heavy flooding of the River Dyfi damaged the railway bridge north of Cemmaes Road station. The line was officially closed on 1 July 1952. The track was lifted early in 1952.

=== After closure: 1952 – present ===
In 1946, the slate warehouse at Dinas Mawddwy station was converted into a woollen mill by a consortium of local sheep farmers. In 1966, it was taken over by Raymond Street, a Cheshire industrialist. Street renamed the operation "Meirion Mill" and turned it into a tourist attraction, weaving and selling a wide range of woollen products. In July 1975, Street opened the 2 ft (610 mm) gauge Meirion Mill Railway on the trackbed of the Mawddwy Railway, running approximately one mile from the station southwards towards Aberangell. This tourist railway operated until Easter 1977, when it was closed and lifted.

== Locomotives ==
These are the locomotives owned and used by the original Mawddwy Railway between 1867 and 1908. After the takeover by the Cambrian, all trains were run by Cambrian Railways locomotives.

Name	Type	Builder	Works number	Date built	Cylinder size	Wheel diameter	Notes
Mawddwy	0-6-0ST	Manning Wardle	140	1864	12 in x 17 in	3 ft 0 in	Delivered in 1865 to contractor R. S. Francis for use on construction of the Potteries, Shrewsbury and North Wales Railway. Sold to the Mawddwy Railway in late 1865. Rebuilt in 1893 and 1911. Transferred to the Van Railway after 1911, scrapped in 1940.
Disraeli	0-6-0ST	Manning Wardle	268	1868	13 in x 18 in	3 ft 6 in	Slightly larger locomotive than Mawddwy, scrapped in 1911.

== Route ==
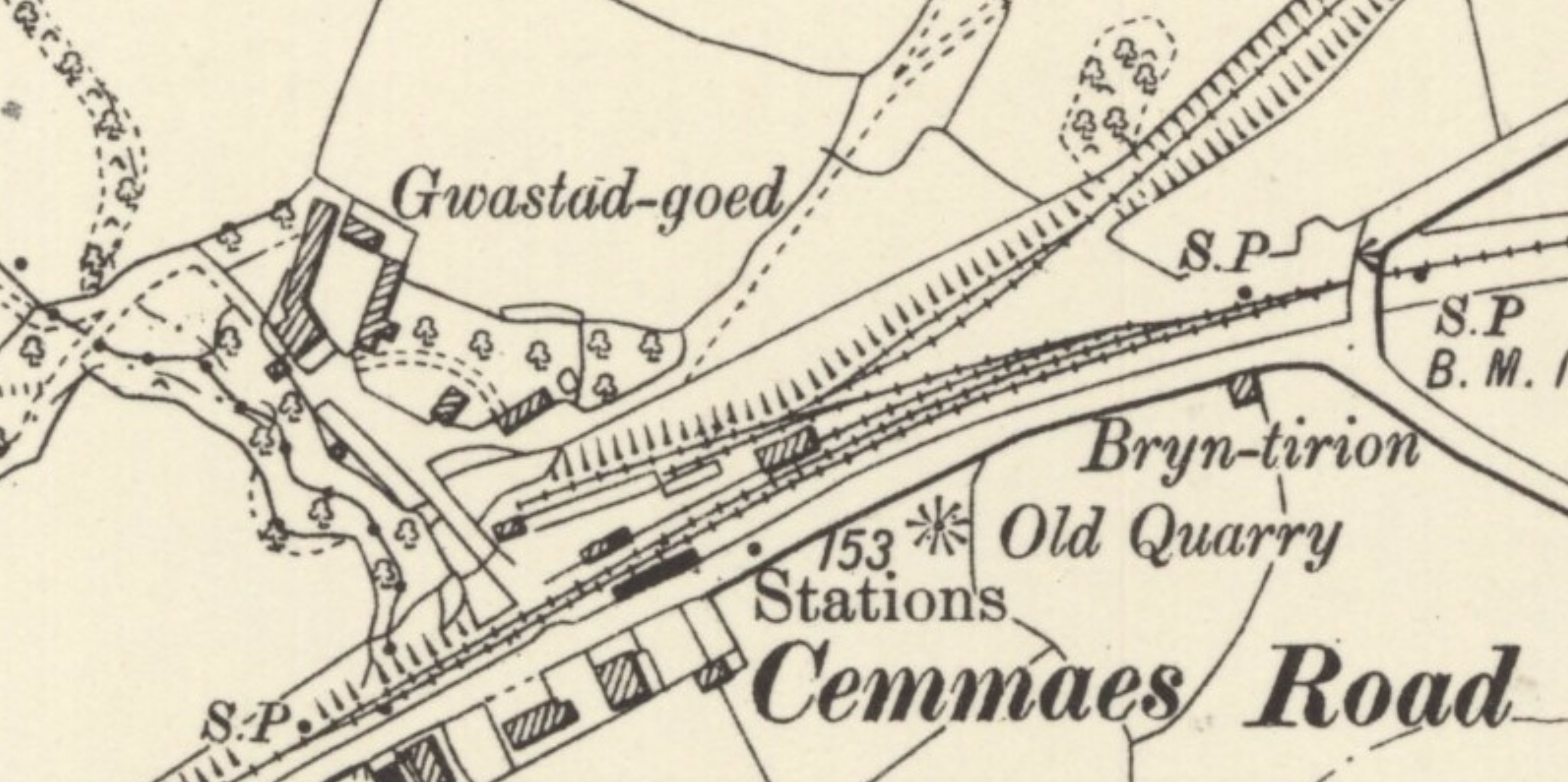
Map showing Cemmaes Road railway stations in 1900, the Mawddwy Railway station is to the north

The Mawddwy Railway began at Cemmes Road, where it formed a junction with the Cambrian Railways main line. The Mawddwy Railway station here was separate from the Cambrian one, with its single platform on the north side of the Cambrian running line. There were tracks on either side of the Mawddwy Railway platform, and its passing loop was to the north east of the platform.

The Mawddway Railway line left Cemmaes Road heading eastwards through a cutting, on a falling gradient of 1 in 41. The line turns to the north through the cutting and emerged to cross the Twymyn on a wooden bridge. On the north side of the bridge, the line continued to head north east and climbed uphill at 1 in 83 to arrive at Cemmaes just over a mile from Cemmes Road. On the north side of the station the railway crossed the Afon Dyfi on a low bridge and continued straight across the floodplain of the river. As it passed Dol-y-fonddu Farm the line turned to run due north along the valley.

As the valley narrowed, the line kept to the west bank of the Dyfi, curving to follow the meanders of the river. It passed Cwm Llinau village on the far side of the river, and three miles from its starting point, it arrived at Nantcyff. Here a siding served a silica mine between 1928 and 1935. The railway then ran for another mile northwards to reach Aberangell. Here there was a small station building and platform, built of slate. To the immediate north of the station was another passing loop, which ran beside the wharf carrying the Hendre-Ddu Tramway.

From Aberangell station, the line passed under Gwastagoed Farm Road Bridge, and ran north towards Dinas Mawddwy. It ran under the hillside called Camlan, which according to local legend is the site of the Battle of Camlann in which King Arthur was killed. At the foot of Camlan was Mallwyd a small halt which served the village of Mallwyd on the east bank of the Dyfi.

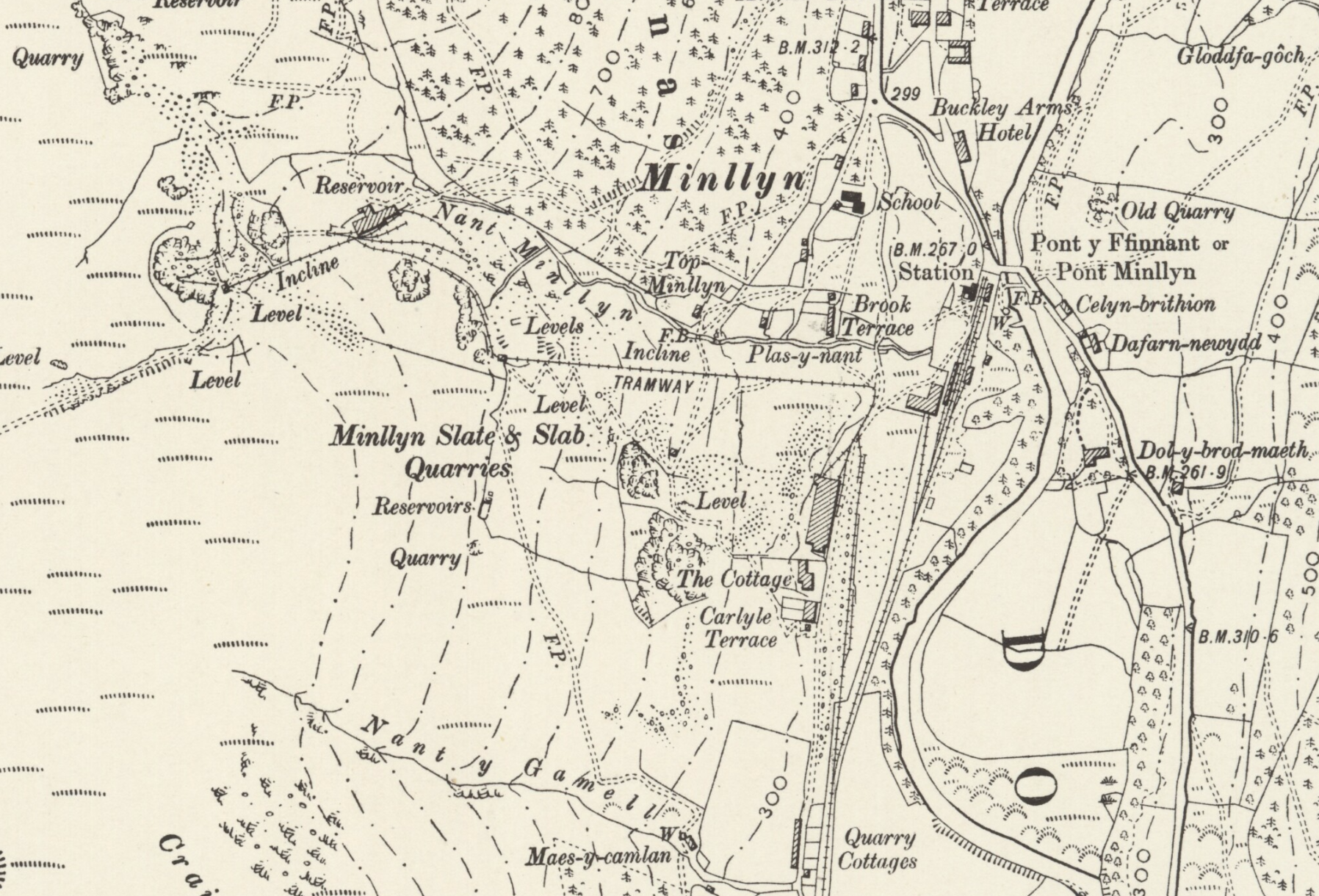
Map showing Dinas Mawddwy railway station and Minllyn Slate Quarry in 1900

About 600 yards before Dinas Mawddwy station, the railway passed "Quarry cottages" at Maes-y-camlan. Here there was a junction, with the main line heading north-west to Dinas Mawddwy and a short branch heading due north to the main mill of the Minllyn slate quarry. A long incline carried the 2 ft 2 in (660 mm) gauge tramway down from the quarry to the mill.

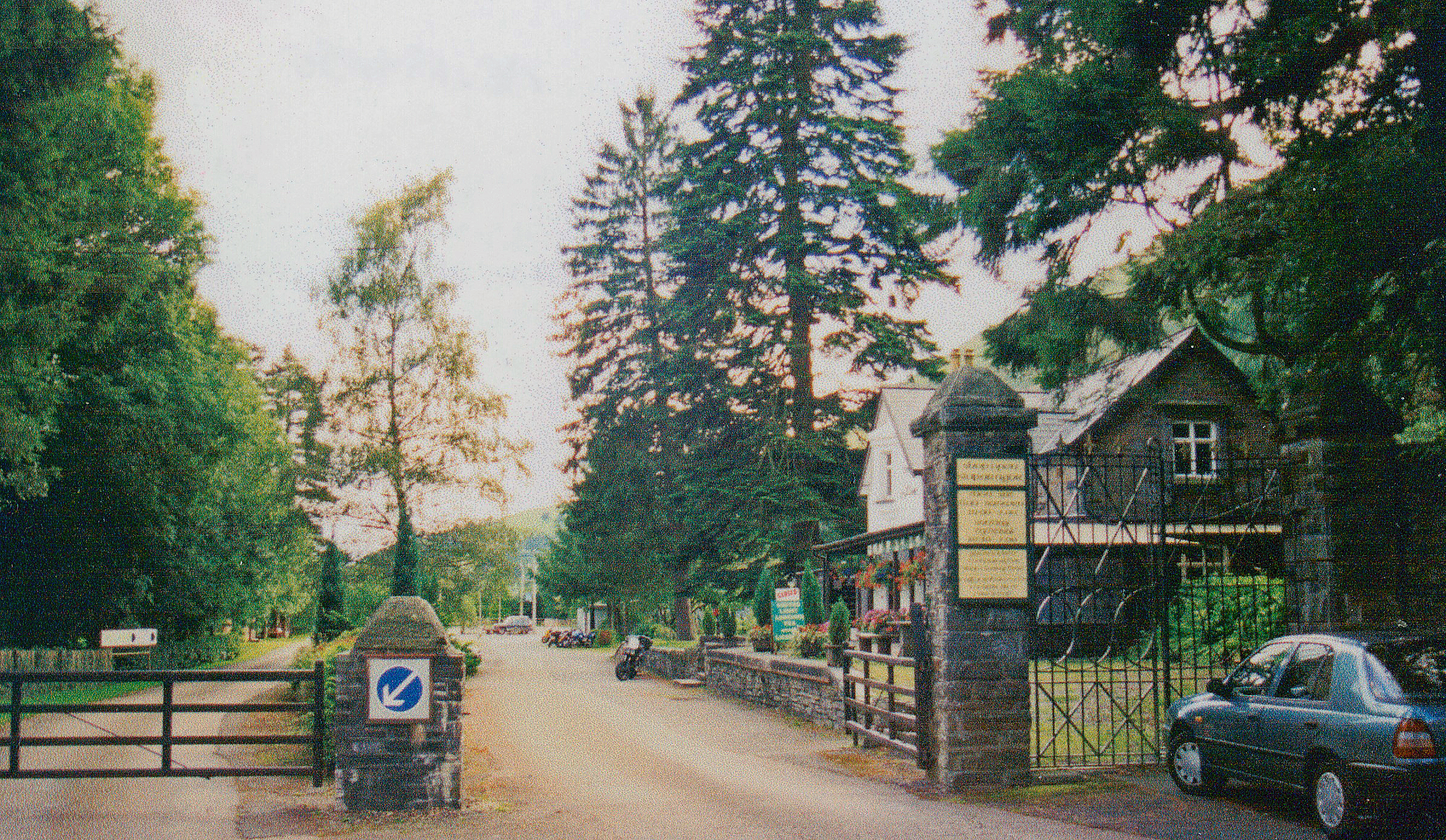
The entrance to Dinas Mawddwy station, looking south. The building on the right is the original station

The final stretch of the Mawddwy Railway headed into Dinas Mawddwy station, where the line terminated just over 6.5 miles from Cemmes Road. The station at Dinas Mawddwy was by far the largest and grandest on the railway, with decorative iron gates leading into the grounds and a fine two-storey station building, much larger than any of the others on the railway.

== Bibliography ==
- Baughan, Peter E. (1980). A Regional History of the Railways of Great Britain: Volume 11 North and Mid Wales (1st ed.). Newton Abbot: David & Charles. ISBN 0-7153-7850-3. OCLC 6823219.
- Baughan, Peter E. (1991). A Regional History of the Railways of Great Britain: Volume 11 North and Mid Wales (2nd ed.). Nairn: David St John Thomas. ISBN 0-9465-3759-3. OCLC 26361284.
- Cozens, Lewis; Kidner, R. W.; Poole, Brian (2004). The Mawddwy, Van & Kerry Branches. The Oakwood Press. ISBN 0853616264.
- Borrow, George (1854). Wild Wales. John Jones Publishing. ISBN 1871083265.
- Richards, Alun John (1999). The Slate Regions of North and Mid Wales, and their Railways. Carreg Gwalch. ISBN 0863815529.
