= Commins Coch =

Village in Wales

Coordinates: 52.61406°N 3.70711°W

Commins Coch: Welsh: Comins-coch
- Location within Powys
- OS grid reference: SH845031
- Community: Glantwymyn
- Principal area: Powys
- Preserved county: Powys
- Country: Wales
- Sovereign state: United Kingdom
- Post town: MACHYNLLETH
- Postcode district: SY20
- Dialling code: 01650
- Police: Dyfed-Powys
- Fire: Mid and West Wales
- Ambulance: Welsh
- UK Parliament: Montgomeryshire and Glyndŵr
- Senedd Cymru – Welsh Parliament: Montgomeryshire

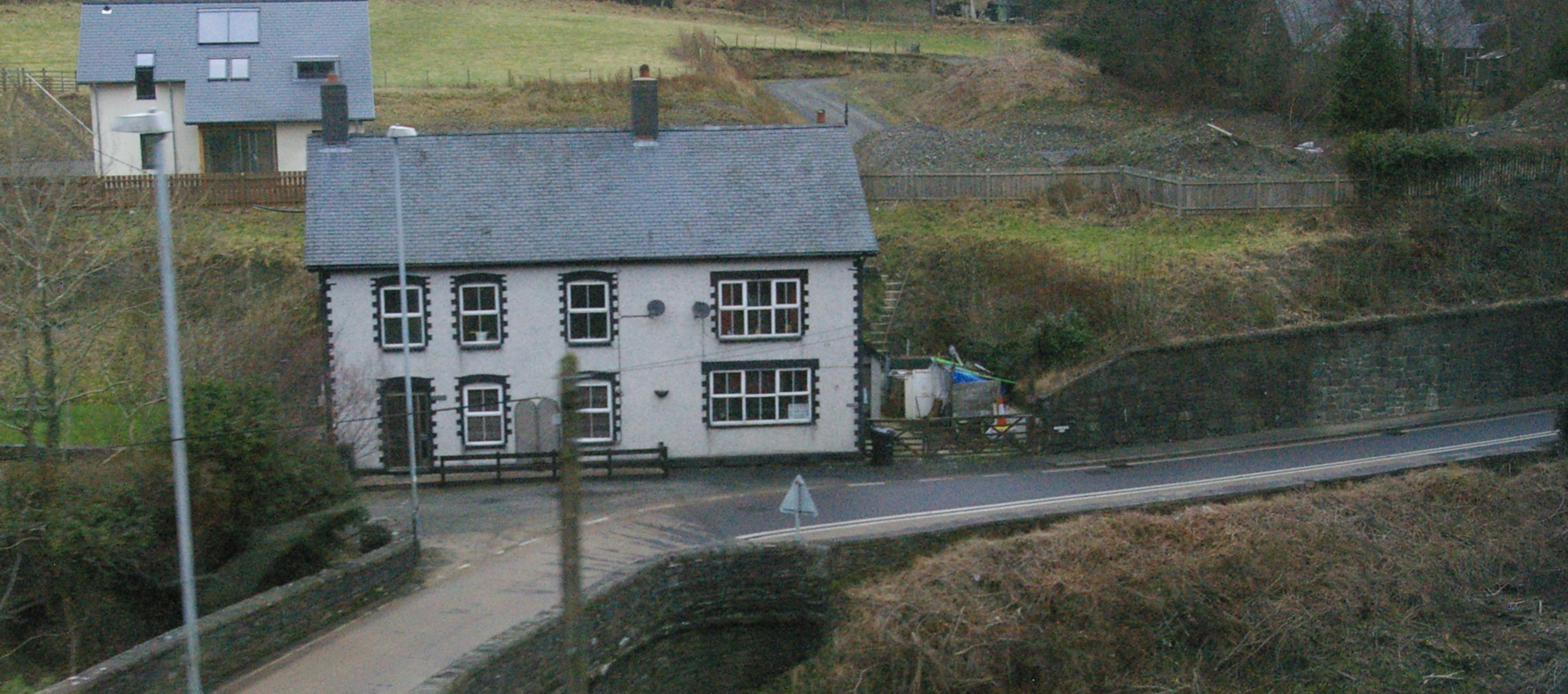
Houses at the bridge at Commins Coch, from the railway. (Photo by Christopher Hilton, 2015)

Commins Coch (Welsh: Comins-coch) is a small village on the A470 in the county of Powys in Wales. It is part of the Glantwymyn community.

Commins Coch is notable for the narrow bridge set at right angles that crosses the Afon Twymyn. The size and angle of the bridge restricts all traffic to crossing one vehicle at a time and it can be a serious problem for articulated lorries to cross.

Commins Coch is also the site of one of the 1970s holiday cottages allegedly burnt down by Meibion Glyndŵr during its campaign against English incomers. The cottage, now restored, can be seen on the right when leaving the village travelling East.

Previously served by Commins Coch Halt railway station on the Cambrian Line.
