= Cambrian Railways works =

Building in Oswestry, Shropshire, England

Coordinates: 52°51.7719′N 3°2.8014′W

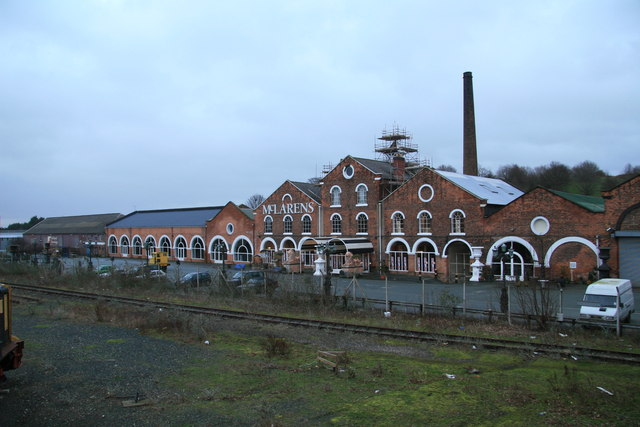
Former Cambrian railway works, Oswestry. Now an antiques warehouse

The Cambrian Railways works is a former railway engineering building located in Oswestry, Shropshire.

Formed from a series of regional railway companies, in July 1865 the Cambrian Railways company extended an Amalgamation Act to include the Aberystwith and Welsh Coast Railway. Having built Oswestry railway station, and relocated its headquarters there, the company need a new railway works.

The site chosen was to the north of the station on Gobowen Road, and its construction hastened Oswestry's boom as a railway town, from a population of 5,500 in 1861, to nearly 10,000 40 years later. Built of local red brick and costing £28,000, the locomotive erecting shop had a central traverser which was hand-moved, serving 12 roads on each side. Apart from the entrance and exit roads, each of the 22 other roads could accommodate a single locomotive or other piece of rolling stock, which again had to be moved into the roads by hand. On the far north end of the works, 11 sidings accessed a carriage and wagon works. Power to the machines was provided by a large steam engine via overhead shafting and belts. The 150 feet (46 m) chimney is still a local landmark.

The works undertook most of the casting, fabrication, assembly and repairs for the Cambrian Railways. But whilst many carriages and wagons were built in the workshops, only two locomotives were actually constructed at Oswestry, although many were extensively rebuilt.

After the Cambrian Railways was taken over by the Great Western Railway on grouping in 1923, the GWR kept it open as a regional carriage and wagon works, and locomotive repair shop for the associated locomotive shed. After becoming part of the London Midland Region in 1963, the depot closed in January 1965, the works in early 1966.

A Grade II listed building, since closure the works' buildings have been used an antiques centre, small business hub and document storage centre.

In July 2011, after extensive renovation to the southern section of the buildings, Oswestry Health Centre opened on this site as a multi-purpose outpatient healthcare centre. Services are provided by Shropshire Community Health Trust, South Staffordshire and Shropshire Mental Health Foundation Trust, The Shrewsbury and Telford Hospital NHS Trust and Cambrian Medical Practice. A Minor Injury Unit (MIU) is also housed at the Oswestry Health Centre and opens from 8:30am to 6pm, Monday to Friday, and 8:30am to 1pm on Saturday and Sunday. X-Ray services are also available at the MIU from 10am until 2pm, Monday to Friday.

In December 2012, a new community ambulance station opened at the Oswestry Health Centre. The new facility has parking for ambulances, rapid response vehicles and ambulance crew. It is also the base for the town's 'round-the clock' dedicated community paramedics.

== See also ==
- Listed buildings in Oswestry
