= Meirion Mill Railway =

Coordinates: 52°42′34″N 3°41′24″W

- Locale: Dinas Mawddwy, Gwynedd, Wales

Commercial operations
- Original gauge: 2 ft (610 mm)

Preserved operations
- Length: 1 mile (1.6 km)
- 1975: Opened
- 1977: Closed

The Meirion Mill Railway was a narrow gauge railway that operated at Meirion Mill in Dinas Mawddwy, Wales. It only operated for three years from 1975 to 1977.

== History ==
Meirion Mill is a tourist attraction that operates in a large slate building on the site of the Dinas Mawddwy station of the Mawddwy Railway. The building was originally a slate warehouse for the nearby Minllyn Slate Quarry. After the Second World War, the building was converted into a woollen mill by a consortium of local sheep farmers. In 1966, it was taken over by Raymond Street, a Cheshire industrialist. Street renamed the operation "Meirion Mill" and turned it into a tourist attraction, weaving and selling a wide range of woollen products.

In 1974, Street was looking for ways to attract more visitors to the mill. He intended to create a small museum related to the Mawddwy Railway on the site. He learned that a narrow gauge steam locomotive called Trixie was available for purchase from the nearby Centre for Alternative Technology. He bought Trixie and commissioned Alan Keef to build a narrow gauge railway next to Meirion Mill along the trackbed of the Mawddwy Railway.

Trixie arrived at the mill on 15 January 1975. The 2 ft (610 mm) gauge track was laid during the spring of 1975, and the railway opened for passengers on 19 July 1975. Along with the track, Alan Keef supplied a diesel locomotive and two passenger carriages that originated at Butlin's Filey holiday camp.

The railway operated for the rest of the 1975 season and during 1976. During the winter of 1976, the line was relaid on the east side of the car park at the mill. Trixie and one of the carriages were moved to Alan Keef that winter and did not return to the railway. The railway opened for the 1977 season with one carriage and the diesel locomotive operating trains. After the opening Easter weekend the railway inspectorate ordered the line closed and it was lifted shortly afterwards.

A few wagons, obtained from the Gartheiniog Slate Quarry on the Hendre-Ddu Tramway, remained on display and in storage at Meirion Mill in 2016.

== Locomotives ==
Name	Type	Builder	Works number	Date built	Arrived at Meirion Mill	Left Meirion Mill	Notes
Trixie	0-4-0ST	Trevor Barber	n/a	1974	15 January 1975	Late 1976	Sold by Alan Keef in 1977 to Rail Rebecq in Belgium. In 2001 she was sold to the Chemin de Fer Chanteraines in Paris. In 2012 she moved to the Tacot des Lacs railway where she remains
	4wDM	Motor Rail	21282	1964	1975		Motor Rail locomotive 21282 seen at the Lea Bailey Light Railway Came from a brickworks at Kempston Hardwick. Supplied by Alan Keef. After the closure of the Meirion Mill Railway, was sold to a peatworks where it worked until 1989. It is now preserved at the Lea Bailey Light Railway
