= Gartheiniog quarry =

Slate quarry in Wales

Gartheiniog
- Location in Gwynedd
- Location: near Aberangell, Merioneth (now Gwynedd), Wales, UK; 52.687325032727585°N 3.744051095709508°W grid reference SH 768 102
- Products: Slate
- Type: Quarry
- Opened: 1880
- Active: 1881–1917; 1920–1937
- Closed: October 1937

Gartheiniog quarry was a slate quarry served by the Hendre Ddu Tramway. It is located about a mile west of Aberangell in Merioneth (now Gwynedd), North Wales near the confluence of the Nant Maesygamfa and the Afon Angell. It worked the Narrow Vein, the highest-quality slate vein in the Abercorris Group.

== History ==
=== Early exploration ===
In 1873, a "take note" (permission to explore for minerals) was granted by Sir Edmund Buckley to search for slate near Gartheiniog Farm. In 1880 that John Jenkins and James Williams, of Aberystwyth took a lease on the land between the Afon Angell and Nant Maesygamfa. They started quarrying there, where the Narrow Vein surfaced.

=== Owen and Mallory ===
In 1881 the Gartheiniog Slate Company Limited was formed to work the quarry commercially. By 1884, the company was owned by Henry Owen of nearby Gartheiniog Farm and Henry Mallory who had recently moved to Aberystwyth from England. Owen and Mallory appointed Edward Hurst Davies as their mine agent. In 1886 an adit was completed that allowed underground mining and in 1887 the quarry was connected to the Hendre Ddu Tramway which ran just to the south of the quarry mill.

Henry Owen died in 1896, and Mallory took over the quarry. The quarry struggled financially around the turn of the century. Between 1909 and 1914, it supplied slabs to the Inigo Jones enamelling works at Groeslon. Mallory died in 1915 and his wife took over as owner of the quarry company.

=== Standard Housing Company ===
The Housing, Town Planning, &c. Act 1919 set off a post-War boom in housing construction in Britain. In 1920, the Standard Housing Company was formed to mass-produce houses built of slate and timber. It purchased the slate quarries at Llangynog and Gartheiniog. It also purchased timber plantations at Gartheiniog and near Aberystwyth. The quarries and plantations were purchased from William Clayton Russon and Roland Morgan, both of whom were undischarged bankrupts, both of them became directors of the company. Morgan would later be convicted of running multiple stock scams, including the Standard Housing Company.

=== Gertrude Russon ===
The Standard Housing Company failed within 18 months and the quarry was sold to Gertrude Russon, William Clayton's wife. She ran the quarry though it struggled financially. It closed down in 1927, was re-opened briefly, then failed again in 1931.

=== Later operations ===
In 1932, George Hadrill took a lease of Gartheiniog and operated it until 1933. Hadrill had been a fighter pilot in the war. He added an enamelling works at the quarry to create a new line of products. Despite this he failed in 1934.

In 1935, the quarry was purchased by Bowley’s Quarries Ltd, a subsidiary of S. Bowley and Son, a London producer of oil-based products. Bowley's operated Gartheiniog until 1937 when the quarry closed for good.
