= Darowen =

Settlement in Powys, Wales

Coordinates: 52.6011°N 3.7278°W

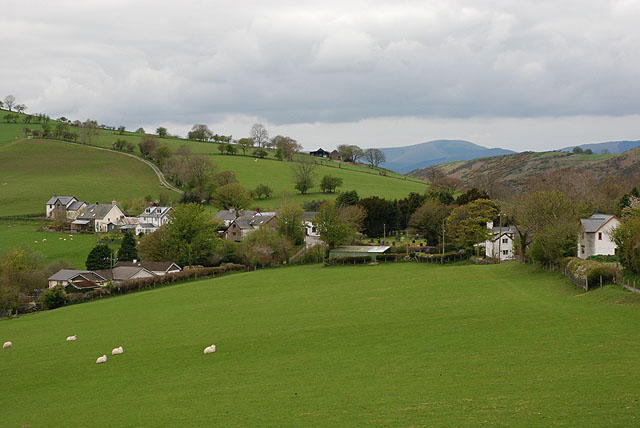
- Darowen viewed from the east

- Location within Powys
- Community: Glantwymyn
- Principal area: Powys
- Preserved county: Powys
- Country: Wales
- Sovereign state: United Kingdom
- Police: Dyfed-Powys
- Fire: Mid and West Wales
- Ambulance: Welsh
- UK Parliament: Montgomeryshire and Glyndŵr
- Senedd Cymru – Welsh Parliament: Montgomeryshire

Darowen is a village in the community of Glantwymyn, in Powys, Wales, located about 6 miles east of Machynlleth.

In the village is the church of St Tudyr. This church was completely rebuilt in 1864. Just to the north of the church is the holy well Ffynnon Dadur.

== History ==
The parish's name came from "Dar-Owain" and meant "Owain's oak".

Darowen was a civil parish, at the 1971 census (the last before the abolition of the parish), Darowen had a population of 393. In 1974 Darowen became a community, on 1 April 1987 the community was abolished.
