= The Marches School =

The Marches

Location
- Morda Road; Oswestry, Shropshire, SY11 2AR; England; 52°51′10″N 3°03′41″W

Information
- Former name: The Marches School and Technology College
- Type: Academy
- Motto: Achievement Through Caring
- Established: 1988
- Founder: Alan Cooper
- Local authority: Shropshire Council
- Trust: Marches Academy Trust
- Department for Education URN: 136979 Tables
- Ofsted: Reports
- Chair of Local Governing Body: Vince Hunt
- Headteacher: Sally Wilmot
- Gender: Coeducational
- Age: 11 to 18
- Enrolment: 1,220 pupils
- Colours: Red, Grey, Black
- Publication: TMS News
- Website: https://marchesschool.co.uk

The Marches School, formerly The Marches School and Technology College, is a coeducational secondary school with sixth form in Oswestry, north-west Shropshire, England. It was the first academy to be created in Shropshire, and the founding academy of the Marches Academy Trust. It has an enrolment of around 1,200 pupils, in year groups 7-11, key stages 3 and 4, ages 11 to 16.

== History ==
The Marches School was formed in September 1988, under the leadership of Alan Cooper, following the merger of Oswestry’s two comprehensive schools: Croeswylan School and Fitzalan Comprehensive School. Until 1988, these two schools had served the town since 1979, when they themselves were the result of a merger between the Oswestry Girls' High School and the Oswestry Boys' High School to form Fitzalan Comprehensive School, and the Oswestry Boys' Modern School and Oswestry Girls' Modern School to form Croeswylan.

Following much development at Morda Road, the Marches School began operating on one site from 1993. The foundations of the largest single building was laid by Leader of the House of Commons, local MP John Biffen.

The school was awarded Technology College status in 1996 and the associated upgraded ICT facilities were officially opened by Conservative Secretary of State for Education, Gillian Shephard.

Further additions and improvements of the school facilities have continued throughout its history, one significant addition being the Millennium Block, whose foundation stone was laid by David Blunkett, Labour Secretary of State for Education.

The school was awarded Ofsted "Outstanding status" in 2010 and subsequently achieved Academy status in August 2011, becoming the founder academy of the Marches Academy Trust. In its latest Ofsted inspection in March 2018, the school was awarded Ofsted “Good” status.

In September 2012, the school officially announced its Sixth Form status, allowing its pupils to continue education until 18 (Years 12-13). In September 2013, the Sixth Form was opened, where students from ages 16–18 can continue their post-GCSE studies in Years 12-13.

== Notable former pupils ==
=== Oswestry High School for Boys ===
- Frank Bough, television sports broadcaster
- John Disley CBE, co-founder of the London Marathon
- Glyn James, Wales international footballer who played for Blackpool
- Sir Wynn Wheldon KBE DSO, civil servant

=== Oswestry High School for Girls ===
- Dame Stephanie Shirley CH DBE, IT pioneer and philanthropist
