= Glantwymyn =

Coordinates: 52.625°N 3.742°W

- Community
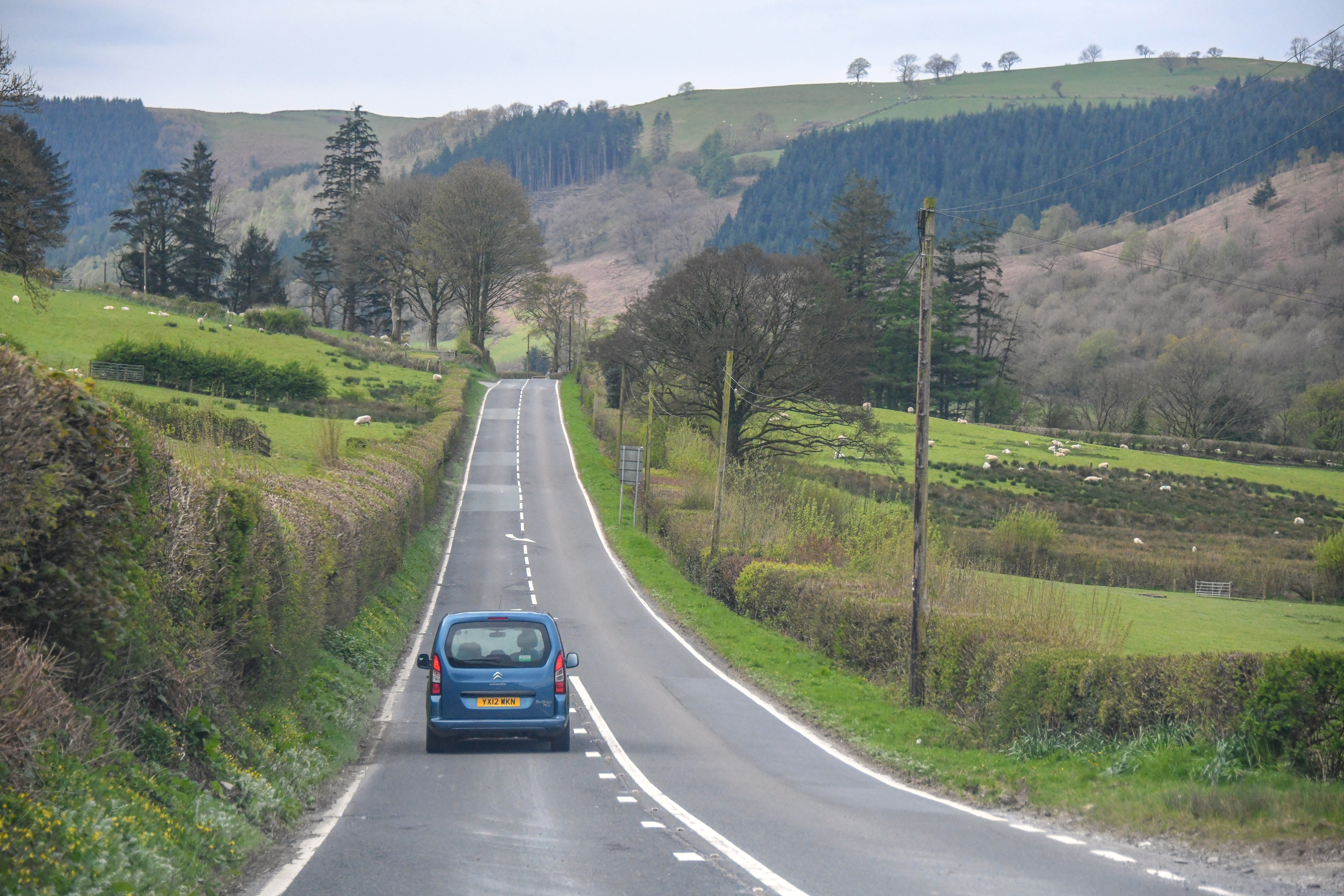
- Principal area: Powys
- Country: Wales
- Sovereign state: United Kingdom
- Police: Dyfed-Powys
- Fire: Mid and West Wales
- Ambulance: Welsh
- List of places UK Wales Powys Map of the community

Glantwymyn (Welsh pronunciation) is a community in the northwest (Montgomeryshire) of Powys, Wales.

The community was created in 1987.

== Description ==
It comprises the villages of Cemmaes, Commins Coch and Cemmaes Road (Welsh name Glantwymyn), as well as the smaller settlements of Abercegir, Darowen, Cwm-llinau, Tal-y-wern, Esgairgeiliog and Llanwrin.

The community had a population of 1,185 as of the 2011 UK Census, including 200 children under 16, in 527 households. 653 of the population were born in Wales.

== Governance ==
Glantwymyn has a community council which has 15 community councillors and is responsible for local matters including cemeteries and bus shelters. Councillors are elected from the community wards of Ceinws, Cemmaes, Darowen and Llanwrin.

Glantwymyn is also the name of the electoral ward which elects a councillor to Powys County Council. The ward also includes the neighbouring community of Cadfarch.

== National Eisteddfod ==
In December 2025 it was confirmed that the 2027 National Eisteddfod of Wales would be held in Glantwymyn. An initial public meeting took place in Glantwymyn Hall on 13 January 2026 to encourage local residents to become involved. Officially called the Maldwyn Meirionnydd National Eisteddfod, it will take place from 31 July to 7 August 2027.
