= Frederick Walton =

English manufacturer and inventor (1834–1928)

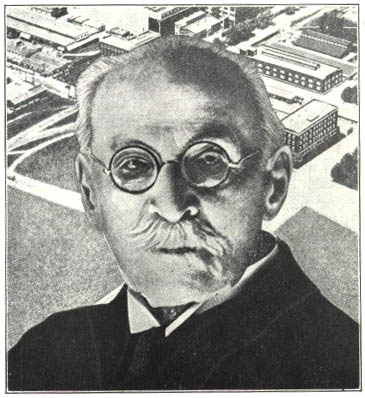
- Born: Frederick Edward Walton; 13 March 1834; Halifax, West Yorkshire, England
- Died: 16 May 1928 (aged 94)
- Occupations: Inventor, manufacturer, businessman
- Known for: Inventing Linoleum and Lincrusta; Founder of Waltons and Sons
- Family: James Walton (father)

Frederick Edward Walton (13 March 1834 – 16 May 1928), was an English manufacturer and inventor whose invention of Linoleum in Chiswick was patented in 1863. He also invented Lincrusta in 1877.

== Early life ==
Walton was born in 1834, near Halifax. His father James Walton was a successful inventor and business owner from Haughton Dale near Manchester, where he owned the Haughton Dale Mill, which supplied wire for James's successful carding business. Frederick Walton was educated at Horton School, in Bradford and at the Wakefield Proprietary School.

== Waltons and Sons ==
In 1855, Frederick joined his father James and brother William in the family wire card-making business of Walton and Sons, in Haughton Dale. He spent much of his time working on new techniques for the business. In 1856, he was granted his first patent for wire brushes with ornamental backings. In 1857, he discovered how to solidify linseed oil, which was to lead to his most famous invention. However he also disagreed with his father about the value of his experimentation. Later in 1857, they dissolved the partnership and Frederick moved to Hammersmith, where he set up his own company to continue his work.

== Invention of Linoleum ==
In 1860, he established an experimental factory in Chiswick where he worked on oxidisation of linseed oil, for which he was granted a patent in 1860. He experimented with the oxidized oil as a replacement for rubber. He discovered that combining the oil with cork and colouring agents produced a useful material for floor covering, and in 1863 patented this new material. Walton called this new cloth "linoleum". He moved his factory to Staines, and in 1864, formed the Linoleum Manufacturing Company which, by 1869, was exporting to Europe and the United States.

== Expansion to America ==
In the 1870s, Walton partnered with carpet manufacturer John Crossley to form the American Linoleum Company. They set up a factory at Linoleumville, New York to manufacture linoleum. Walton spent two years in America setting up the factory and starting the business, before returning to the United Kingdom. The America company was highly successful and profitable.

== Patents ==
Walton obtained further patents for processes related to the production of linoleum. In 1863, he patented a method of passing sheets of coloured linoleum through rollers to emboss a pattern on them. In 1882, he patented machinery to make inlaid mosaic floor coverings. He also invented a number of related products, most notably Lincrusta, an embossed wall-covering based on linoleum, launched in 1877. In all he obtained over 100 patents.

== Cwmllecoediog ==
In 1868, Walton moved to the Cwmllecoediog Estate near Aberangell, which was owned by his father. In 1870, he built a new house there, Plas Cwmllecoediog, and in 1883 he gave land and funds to build a school in the village. In 1886, he partnered with quarry manager Edward Hurst Davies to purchased and develop Maesygamfa slate quarry. They ran it together until the partnership was dissolved in 1900.

== Death ==
Walton died in May 1928, aged 94.

== Personal life ==
In 1867, Walton married Alice Scruby. They had four children:

- Olive Mary Walton. Born 1871. Author and Photographer. Married Herbert Vivian in 1897.
- Frederick James Walton, born 1877.
- Clarice Walton, born 1879.
- Violet Walton.

Walton was an avid collector of art, and also painted himself. His son-in-law Herbert Vivian said that Walton "bought many expensive paintings and painted many excellent ones himself".

== Books ==
- Frederick Walton and Company (1881). Lincrusta. The Sunbury wall decoration. LCCN unk82056986.
- Walton, Frederick (1925). The infancy and development of linoleum floorcloth.
