= S. Bowley and Son =

English manufacturing company

S. Bowley and Son Ltd.
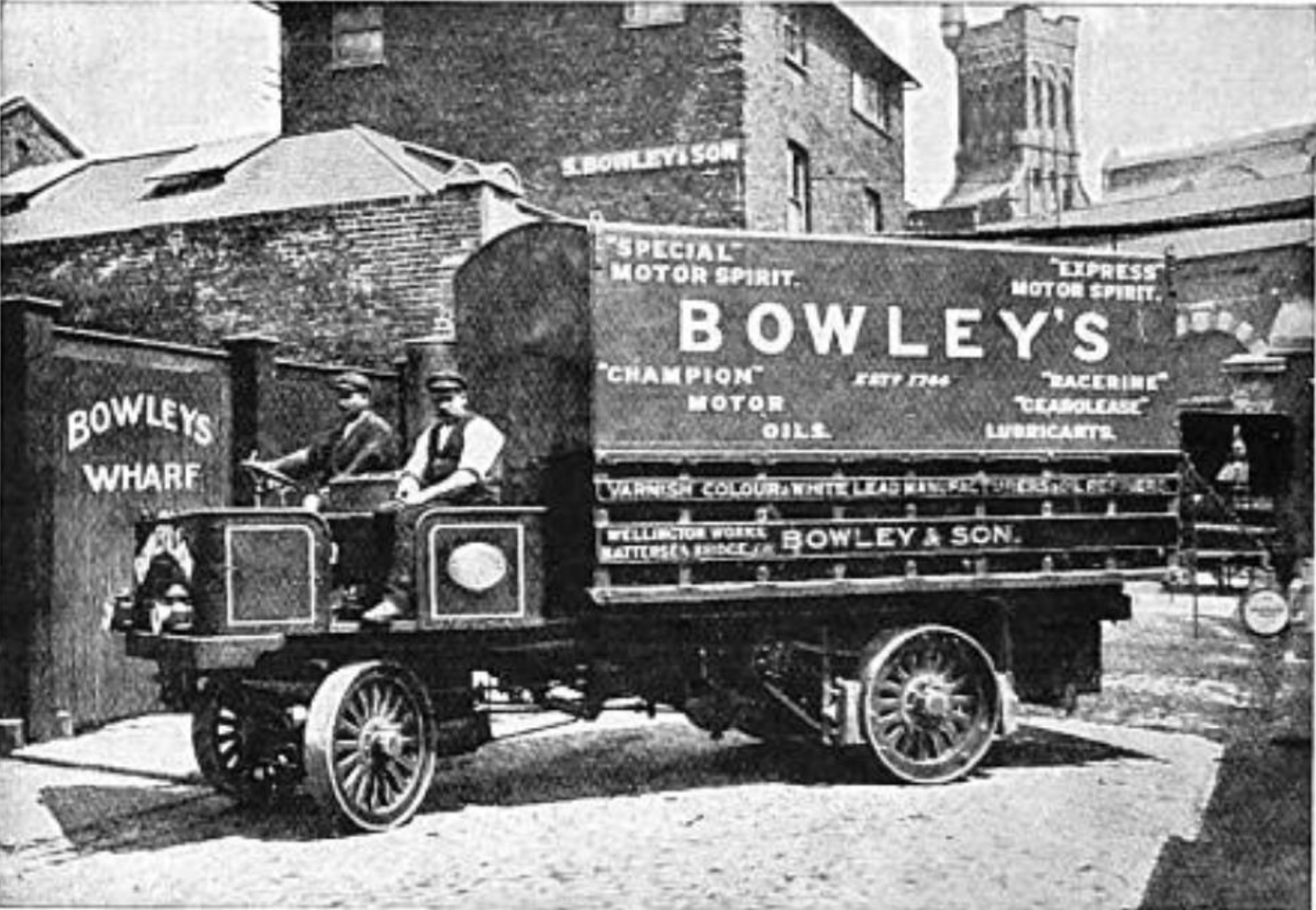
- A Coulthard steam wagon at the Battersea Bridge works of S. Bowley and Son in 1905
- Industry: Manufacturing
- Founded: 1744; 282 years ago in London
- Founder: Joseph Bowley
- Defunct: 1963
- Headquarters: Battersea, London, United Kingdom
- Products: Lubricant, oil, fuels, paint, soap and candles

S. Bowley and Son was a manufacturer of lubricants, oils, soaps and candles, founded in 1744.

== History ==
S. Bowley and Son was founded by Joseph Bowley, in Westminster in 1744 to manufacture soap and candles, and to refine oil. In 1868, the company built the Wellington Works at Battersea Bridge and moved there.

In 1883, there was a major fire at the Wellington Works distillery that resulted in the destruction of two barges moored beside the works, the distillery and warehouses and boiler house.

The company was an early producer of petroleum fuels for motor cars, in 1902 it was one of the four London refineries that held a license to import oil in barges along the River Thames. By 1910, they were producing specialist fuels for aircraft.

In 1935, the company established Bowley's Quarries Ltd as a subsidiary, and purchased the Gaertheiniog slate quarry in Wales. The quarry closed in 1937.

By the early 1950s, the company was primarily making paint, and at the end of the decade it was manufacturing hand trucks and trolleys.

In 1963, the company was wound up. It was succeeded by Bowley and Coleman Trucks Ltd, based in Bedfordshire, which continued to produce the hand trucks and trolleys.
