= Minllyn quarry =

Slate quarry near Dinas Mawddwy, Wales

Minllyn
- Location in Gwynedd
- Location: near Dinas Mawddwy, Montgomeryshire (now Powys), Wales, UK; 52.7188°N 3.69823°W
- Products: Slate
- Type: Quarry
- Opened: 1790s
- Closed: 1925

Minllyn quarry was a slate quarry near Dinas Mawddwy in Wales that opened before 1793 and continued working intermittently until 1925. The quarry is located on the western flank of Foel Dinas.

== Geology ==
Three parallel veins of Ordovician slate run through mid Wales. These veins surface at three locations – around Abergynolwyn in the west, surrounding Corris, and at their easternmost in the district around Dinas Mawddwy. Each of these locations has been a centre for slate quarrying, and Corris was the largest producer of the three.

== History ==
Slate quarrying at Dinas Mawddwy dates back to at least 1793. In 1839, the Minllen Slate and Slab Company was formed to work the quarry, but it went bankrupt in 1844. The main quarry was Minllyn quarry, a Narrow Vein quarry about a mile south of the town. This was connected to the Mawddwy Railway's Dinas Mawddwy station by a 1/2-mile-long (0.80 km) 2 ft 2 in (660 mm)-gauge incline.

In 1856, a prosperous mill owner from Ardwick, Sir Edmund Buckley purchased the Lordship of Dinas Mawddwy and with it a large estate covering 12,000 acres of the town and local area. Sir Edmund's eldest son, also called Edmund Buckley and later made a baronet took over the Dinas Mawddwy estate and title in 1864. The younger Sir Edmund spent lavishly on his new estate. He purchased Minllyn quarry and, to get the slate to market he built the Mawddwy Railway to connect to the Newtown and Machynlleth Railway line, at Cemmes Road.

In 1864, William Bullock, the mayor of Congleton formed the Merioneth Slate and Slab Company and leased the quarry. This company failed in 1871, and Bullock and new partner Robert Carlyle formed the Carlyle Slate and Slab Company to take over the quarry. Edmund Buckley declared bankruptcy in 1876 and most of his assets were sold off. The part of the estate containing Minllyn quarry was purchased by the Carlyle company.

The Carlyle company was declared bankrupt in 1886. In 1889, William Bullock's two sons formed yet another company to operate Minllyn, this one called the Minllyn Slate Company - though the quarry continued to be referred to as the Carlyle Quarry for many years. The quarry operated until the First World War when its warehouse at Dinas Mawddwy station was requisitioned for timber cutting. Work at the quarry restarted around 1919, but it closed for the final time in 1925.

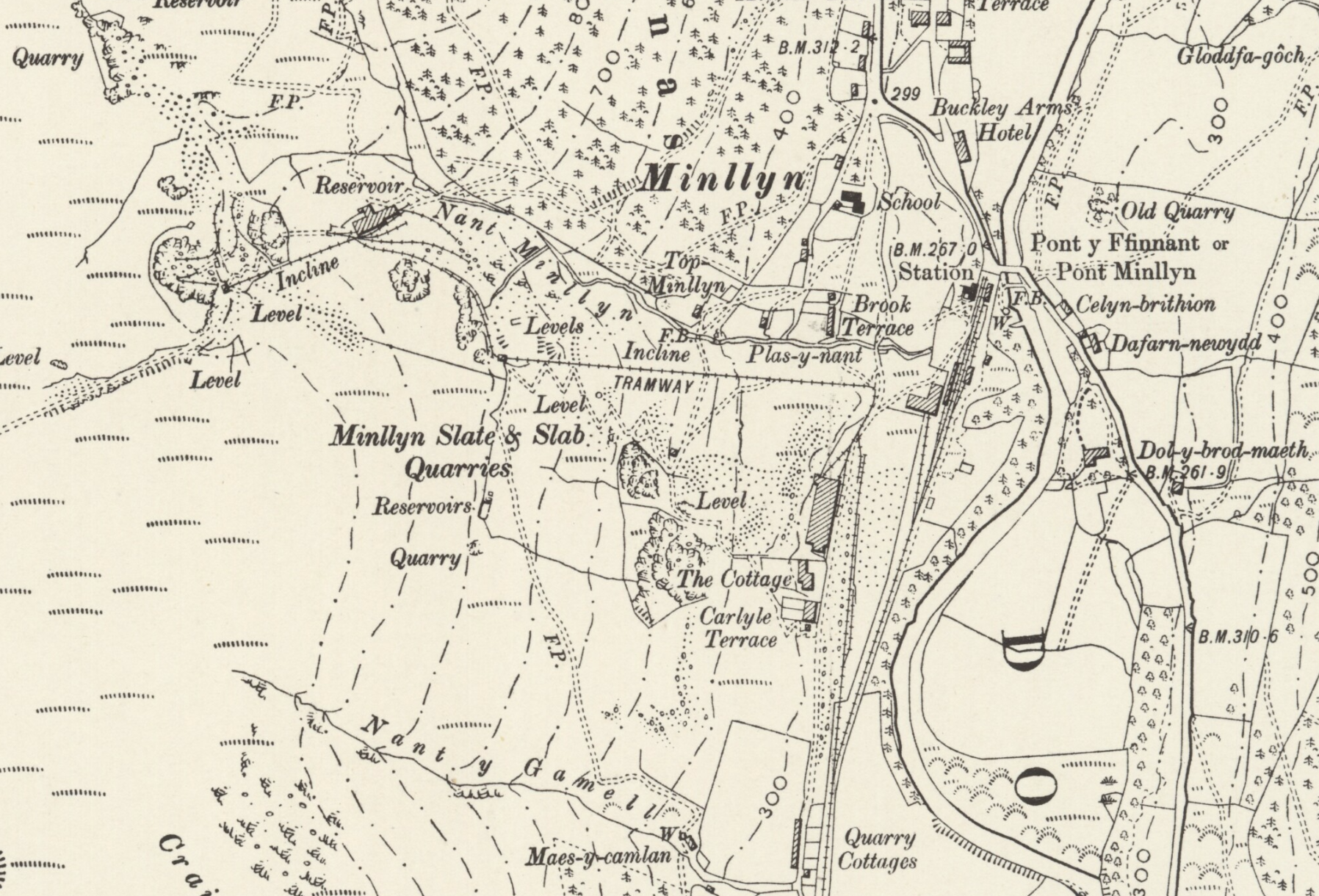
Map of Minllyn quarry in 1900

== Cae Abaty ==
In the late 1860s, the Merioneth Slate and Slab Company opened another quarry on the west side of Foel Dinas, called Cae Abaty. This was separated from the main quarry by a large ridge, and a pair of linked 2 ft 2 in (660 mm) gauge inclines were laid to lift rock up from Cae Abaty and lower it to the upper mill at Minllyn. Cae Abaty's output was mostly slabs used to produce billiard tables, but also produced some crude roofing slates. The quarry worked intermittently and closed between 1901 and 1911.

Cae Abaty is a relatively small quarry and the requirement to haul rock over Foel Dinas would have made it expensive to operate. Nevertheless, the owners installed a steam crane to help untop the main pit, probably in the 1890s. The crane was a "Patent Steam Guy Crane" built by Joseph Booth & Brothers of Rodley near Leeds and may have been used at Minllyn before being moved to Cae Abaty.

== Description ==
Minllyn quarry was spread over a large area. The original workings were a series of open pits known as Bron-yr-Wylfa at the bottom of the east flank of Foel Dinas. In the 1803s, the Minllen Slate and Slab Company opened a new set of quarries about 800 feet (240 m) higher up the mountain where the Narrow Vein surfaced. These were quickly extended underground, following the slate vein. The company built a mill at this level which was powered by a 6 hp stationary steam engine - this was one of the earliest steam-powered slate mills in Wales.

In the 1850s, under the ownership of Edmund Buckley, a long incline was dropped from the upper level to the valley floor. A new lower mill was built at the foot of the incline and it was connected to the Mawddwy Railway by a siding in 1867. This mill had 40 slate working machines, including 8 planers. Some exploratory working of the bottom levels was done in the 1870s, but the commercial working was restricted to the levels at and above the upper mill.

The steam engine powering the upper mill was replaced at an unknown date by a Pelton wheel fed from a small reservoir above it. A line of stone pillars leads north from the mill, which probably carried compressed air lines to power underground drills. One of the underground chambers contains the remains of a vertical-boilered steam crane, similar to the one used at Cae Abaty.

== After closure ==
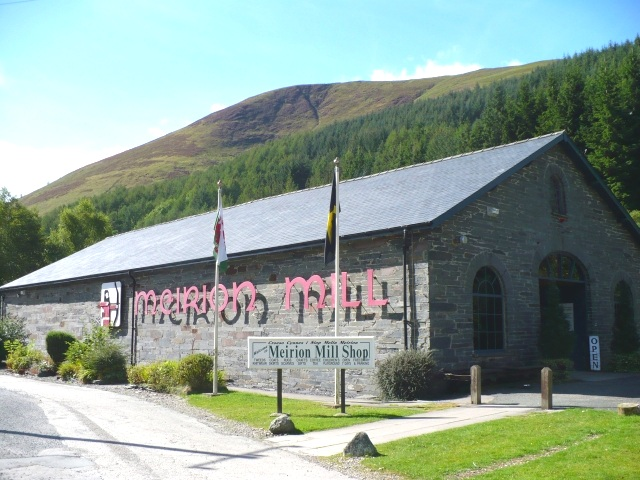
Meirion Mill, in the former warehouse of Minllyn quarry

The quarry's warehouse at Dinas Mawddwy Station was taken over in 1946 by a consortium of local farmers who converted it into a woollen mill. In 1966, Cheshire industrialist Raymond Street took over. Street modernised the spinning equipment and expanded the business. He adopted the name Meirion Mill for his business. In 1975 he laid the short 2 ft (610 mm) gauge Meirion Mill Railway at the mill, though this only operated until Easter 1977.
