= Cemmaes Road =

Village in Powys, Wales

Coordinates: 52.625°N 3.742°W

Cemmaes Road: Welsh: Glantwymyn
- Location within Powys
- Population: 1,185 (2011)
- OS grid reference: SH821044
- Community: Glantwymyn
- Principal area: Powys
- Preserved county: Powys
- Country: Wales
- Sovereign state: United Kingdom
- Post town: MACHYNLLETH
- Postcode district: SY20
- Dialling code: 01650
- Police: Dyfed-Powys
- Fire: Mid and West Wales
- Ambulance: Welsh
- UK Parliament: Montgomeryshire and Glyndŵr
- Senedd Cymru – Welsh Parliament: Montgomeryshire

Cemmaes Road (Welsh: Glantwymyn; Welsh pronunciation) is a village in Powys, Wales. It is in the community (civil parish) of Glantwymyn.

The village was named in English after the now-closed Cemmes Road station on the Newtown and Machynlleth Railway, now part of the Cambrian Line. Cemmes Road was also the junction with the Mawddwy Railway.

The Welsh name for the village, and for the community, is Glantwymyn (English: the Twymyn Riverside), as it lies on the River Twymyn. According to the United Kingdom Census 2001, the population of the community was 1,072, increasing to 1,185 at the 2011 Census.

The village of Cemmaes is 1 3/4 miles to the northeast. Cemmaes Road lies at the junction of the major A470 and A489 roads. The historic Mathafarn Hall is less than 1/2 mile north-west of Cemmaes Road.

Ysgol Glantwymyn primary school is located in the village.

== Governance ==
An electoral ward in the Welsh name exists, which also covers the neighbouring community of Cadfarch. The ward had a population of 2,040 at the 2011 Census.

== Welsh language ==
According to the 2001 census, 58.5% of the people in the community can speak the Welsh language. The age group with the highest number of Welsh speakers is the 15-year-olds, where every 15-year-old could speak the language.
