= Cemmaes =

Coordinates: 52.6387°N 3.7181°W

Cemmaes: Welsh: Cemaes
- Location within Powys
- OS grid reference: SH839061
- Principal area: Powys
- Preserved county: Powys
- Country: Wales
- Sovereign state: United Kingdom
- Post town: MACHYNLLETH
- Postcode district: SY20
- Dialling code: 01650
- Police: Dyfed-Powys
- Fire: Mid and West Wales
- Ambulance: Welsh
- UK Parliament: Montgomeryshire and Glyndŵr
- Senedd Cymru – Welsh Parliament: Montgomeryshire

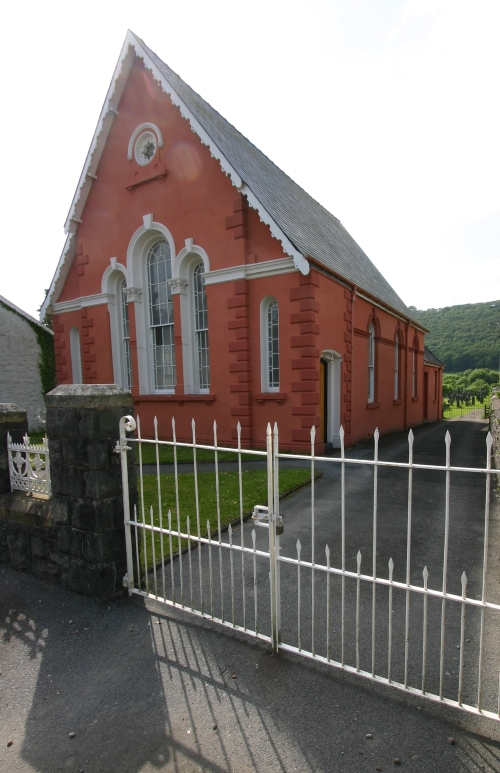
Cemmaes Methodist Church

Cemmaes (Welsh: Cemaes) is a village in northern Powys, Wales, in Glantwymyn community. Until 1987 it was a community itself.

The population numbered 935 in 1841, this dropped between 1881 and 1891 from 946 to 729.

There was a railway station in the village on the Mawddwy Railway which connected to the main Cambrian Line at Cemmaes Road.

Author George Borrow recounted an amusing incident in the village's local pub in his 1862 travelogue Wild Wales. The passage was later reprinted in the book 'In the Country', in 1975.
