= Cemmes Road railway station =

Former railway station in Powys, Wales

Cemmes Road
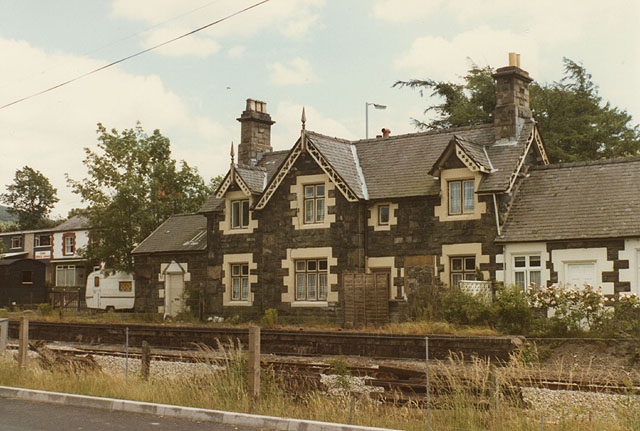
- Cemmes Road station building, after conversion to private residential accommodation, September 1982

General information
- Location: Cemmaes Road, Powys; Wales
- Coordinates: 52.6249°N 3.7442°W
- Grid reference: SH819044
- Platforms: 3

Other information
- Status: Disused

History
- Original company: Newtown and Machynlleth Railway
- Pre-grouping: Cambrian Railways
- Post-grouping: Great Western Railway

Key dates
- 3 January 1863: Opened
- 14 June 1965: Closed
Location

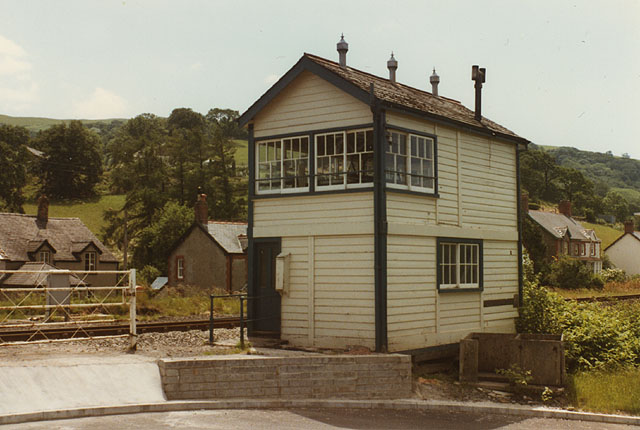
Cemmes Road signal box, September 1982. A standard prefabricated design made at Swindon Works. The box was dismantled and moved to a heritage railway shortly after the photo was taken.

Cemmes Road was a railway station on the Newtown and Machynlleth Railway (N&MR) in Mid-Wales, serving the village of Cemmaes Road.

The N&MR passed through the Cambrian Mountains in the deep Talerddig cutting, which formed the summit of the line. From there it descended towards the coast, reaching the Dyfi valley at the village of Cemmaes Road, where there was a junction with the Mawddwy Railway. The N&MR continued west to Machynlleth.

The next station, north of Cemmes Road on the Mawddwy Railway, served the village of Cemmaes. To avoid confusion with that station, the N&MR's English backers named the junction station using an Anglicised version of the village's Welsh language name.

Cemmes Road station closed as a result of the Beeching Axe in 1965, although the station building still exists as a private house.

The signal box and passing loop closed in 1984 as part of rationalization.

Preceding station	Disused railways	Following station
Terminus	Cambrian Railways; Mawddwy Railway	Cemmaes; Line and station closed
	Historical railways	
Machynlleth; Line and station open	Cambrian Railways; Newtown and Machynlleth Railway	Commins Coch Halt; Line open, station closed
