= Aberangell =

Coordinates: 52.674°N 3.708°W

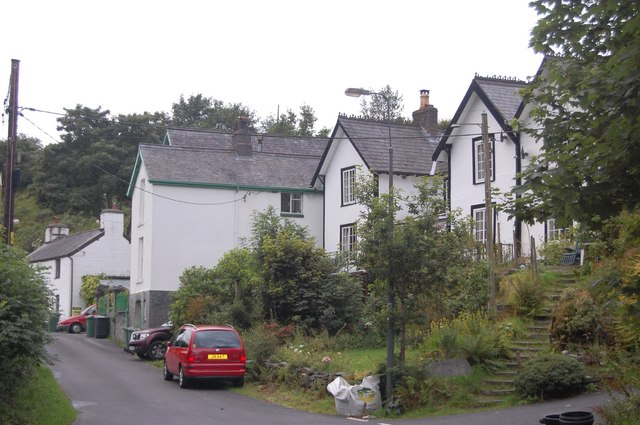
- Walton Terrace in Aberangell

- Location within Gwynedd
- OS grid reference: SH845098
- Community: Mawddwy
- Principal area: Gwynedd
- Country: Wales
- Sovereign state: United Kingdom
- Post town: MACHYNLLETH
- Postcode district: SY20
- Dialling code: 01650
- Police: North Wales
- Fire: North Wales
- Ambulance: Welsh
- UK Parliament: Dwyfor Meirionnydd
- Senedd Cymru – Welsh Parliament: Gwynedd Maldwyn

Aberangell (Welsh pronunciation) is a village in Gwynedd, Wales.

== Geography ==
Aberangell stands at the confluence of the Afon Angell and the Afon Dyfi, and lies within Dinas Mawddwy community. On the north side of the village, the long ridge of Pen y Clipau runs down from the summit of Foel Dinas. The Afon Mynach joins the Afon Angell just west of the village with the rounded slopes of Moel y Ffridd beyond.

== History ==
=== Estates ===
During the Victorian era, three major estates dominated the village and its surrounding area. To the north lay Sir Edmund Buckley's Dinas Mawddwy estate; to the south and east was Dolcorsllwyn Hall, owned by Sir Thomas Frost; and to the west lay Plas Cwmllecoediog, owned by James Walton and his sons William and Frederick.

=== Transport ===
Aberangell railway station was on the Mawddwy Railway. It was also the terminus of the narrow gauge Hendre-Ddu Tramway.

=== 1990 onwards ===
Royal Mail announced the closure of Aberangell post office in October 2008. In 1993 and 2008 Aberangell won Calor Village of the Year in Wales.

== Notable residents ==
- Edward Hurst Davies (1855–1927) owner and manager of Maesygamfa quarry, and later Hendreddu quarry
- Herbert Harold Disley (1900-1972) manager of Hendreddu quarry
