= Aberangell railway station =

Disused railway station in Gwynedd, Wales

Coordinates: 52.67466°N 3.70821°W

Aberangell

General information
- Location: Aberangell, Gwynedd; Wales
- Platforms: 1

Other information
- Status: Disused

History
- Original company: Mawddwy Railway
- Pre-grouping: Cambrian Railways
- Post-grouping: Great Western Railway

Key dates
- 1867: Station opens
- 1874: Hendre Ddu Tramway opens
- 17 April 1901: Station closes to passengers
- 31 July 1911: Station reopens
- 1 January 1931: Station closes to passengers
- 1939: Hendre Ddu Tramway closes
- 1952: Station closes to all traffic
Location

Aberangell railway station was an intermediate railway station on the Mawddwy Railway which ran from Cemmaes Road to Dinas Mawddy in the Welsh county of Merionethshire. The station was opened by the Mawddwy Railway in 1867 and closed to all goods traffic in 1908. The railway re-opened in 1911 with all services run by the Cambrian Railways. It was amalgamated into the Great Western Railway in 1923 as part of the grouping of British railways, and remained open to passenger and freight traffic until 1931 and 1952, respectively. The station was the transshipment point between the branch and the Hendre Ddu Tramway.

== History ==
The Mawddwy Railway was first opened in 1867, however it was closed to passenger traffic in 1901, and closed to all goods traffic in 1908. It reopened on 31 July 1911 as a light railway system, as a result of the support of several local councils. The railway was incorporated, as part of the Cambrian Railways, into the Great Western Railway during the Grouping of 1923. The railway closed its passenger services in 1931, although the line continued to remain open for freight traffic until 1952.

The station served local passenger needs. There was also a thriving goods service, with parcels and farm machinery delivered by the Mawddwy Railway and livestock being sent away from the station. The Hendre Ddu Tramway connected a number of local slate quarries to the station, where a wharf was provided to unload slate onto Mawddwy Railway wagons. During the First World War a great deal of timber was felled in the forests west of Aberangell. This was sawn into pit props and sent down the Hendre Ddu Tramway to be shipped out on the standard gauge railway. This timber traffic continued into the early 1920s. Some logs were shipped to Dinas Mawddwy where a sawmill processed them into timber. The Hendre Ddu Tramway closed in 1938. During the Second World War ammunition was stored in the Hendreddu Quarry, arriving by Great Western Railway trains and being taken by lorry along the tramway trackbed to the quarry.

Preceding station	Disused railways	Following station
Cemmaes; Line and station closed	Cambrian Railways; Mawddwy Railway	Mallwyd; Line and station closed
