= Sir Edmund Buckley, 2nd Baronet =

British baronet (1861–1919)

Sir Edmund Buckley (1861-1919) was the 2nd Baronet of Mawddwy, inheriting the title from his father Sir Edmund Buckley, 1st Baronet.

== Biography ==
Buckley was born at Llandovery in 1861. He was the son of Edmund Peck, who later took the surname Buckley from Edmund Buckley of Ardwick and became Sir Edmund Buckley, 1st Baronet.

In 1885, Buckley married Harriet Olivia Louise Lloyd.

In 1902 he left Britain for British Columbia to escape his debts. He was declared bankrupt in his absence in January 1903. His father died in 1910 and Buckley became the Second Baronet of Mawddwy. He returned to Britain in 1911 and discharged his bankruptcy.

Buckley died at Aberhirnant Hall, one of the homes he inherited from his father, in August 1919. He was the last male member of the Buckley family, so the Baronetcy became extinct on his death.

== Edmund Maurice Buckley ==
Buckley had one son, Edmund Maurice Buckley, who was born on 1 December 1886.

Edmund Maurice Buckley joined the 7th Battalion of the Royal Welsh Fusiliers as a Second Lieutenant at the outbreak of the First World War. He served in the Gallipoli Campaign and died in the assault on Suvla Bay on 12 August 1915.

Baronetage of the United Kingdom
Preceded by Edmund Buckley	Baronet (of Mawddwy, Merioneth); 1910–1919	Extinct
