= Battle of Downing Street =

Suffragette protest march in 1910

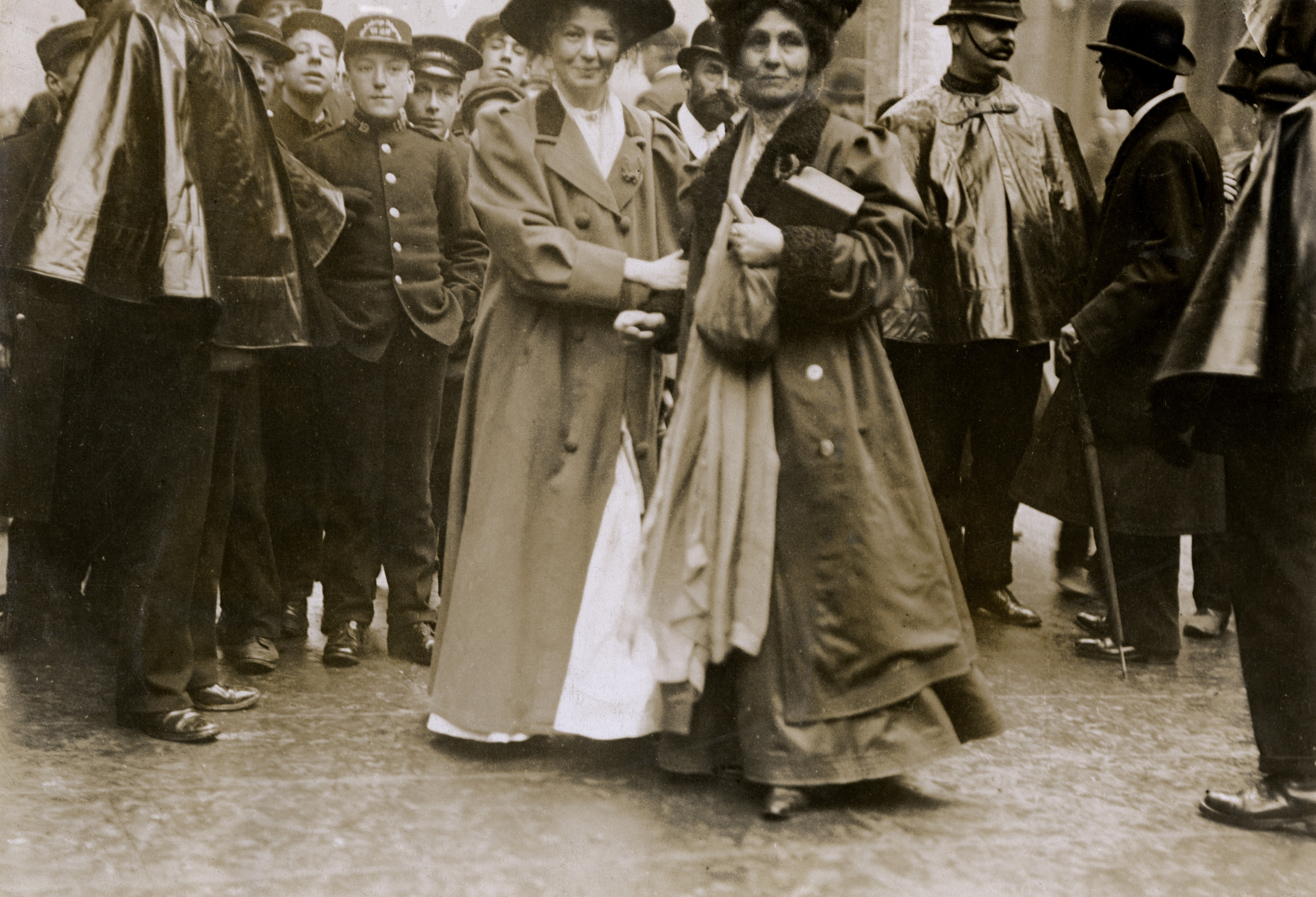
- Christabel and Emmeline Pankhurst, 1910
- Date: 22 November 1910
- Location: Downing Street, London, England; 51°30′11.6″N 0°07′39.0″W
- Methods: Demonstration, smashing windows

Parties
Women's Social and Political Union (suffragettes)	Liberal government, 1905–1915

Lead figures
Emmeline Pankhurst	H. H. Asquith

Number
200 protesters	

Arrests
- Arrested: 159 women; three men

The Battle of Downing Street was a march of suffragettes to Downing Street, London, on 22 November 1910. Organized by Emmeline Pankhurst's Women's Social and Political Union, the march took place four days after Black Friday, a suffragette protest outside the House of Commons that saw the women subjected to violence by police.

== Prime Minister's statement ==
Taking place in the context of the debate over the Conciliation Bill 1910 (giving a limited number of women the vote according to property and marital status), the march was a direct response to a statement by the Prime Minister H. H. Asquith that: "The Government will, if they are still in power, give facilities in the next Parliament for effectively proceeding with a Bill which is framed so as to admit of free amendment", which suggested that the bill would have no chance of being passed.

Emmeline and Christabel Pankhurst were at Caxton Hall when news arrived of Asquith's speech; Christabel announced to the audience that it was a declaration of war: "The promise for next parliament is an absurd mockery of a pledge. They have been talking of declarations of war. We also declare war from this moment." Emmeline told the crowd: "I am going to Downing Street. Come along, all of you."

== March on Downing Street ==
Around 200 women marched on Downing Street, smashing windows at the Colonial Office and Home Office, and on Asquith's car; Emmeline Pankhurst and her sister, Mary Clarke, were arrested, along with another 157 women and three men. Clarke was arrested for throwing a stone through the window at Canon Row Police Station, where Pankhurst was being held, after the police refused to let Clarke see her. In an unpublished letter to The Times, Hertha Ayrton wrote: "I was marching immediately behind Mrs Pankhurst when she entered Downing Street, but was prevented from reaching No. 10 by an attempt at strangulation on the part of a policeman." About 20 women approached 10 Downing Street, the prime minister's residence, from the back and swarmed around Augustine Birrell, the Chief Secretary for Ireland. He said they "pulled me about and hustled me, 'stroked' my face [and] knocked off my hat". In trying to get away, he was left with a twisted knee and slipped kneecap. Birrell did not seek a prosecution; he wrote to the Home Secretary, Winston Churchill, on 21 February 1911: "[L]et the matter drop but keep your eye on the hags in question."

== See also ==
- Women's suffrage in the United Kingdom

== Works cited ==
- Bartley, Paula (2002). Emmeline Pankhurst. London: Routledge. ISBN 978-0-415-20651-8.
- Churchill, Randolph Spencer (1969). Winston S. Churchill: Volume Two Companion, 1900–1914. London: Houghton Mifflin.
- Lee, Alison; Colmore, Gertrude (2008). "Appendix D: The Conciliation Bill and Black Friday". In Lee, Alison (ed.). Suffragette Sally. Peterborough, Ontario: Broadview Press. pp. 342–357. ISBN 978-1-55111-474-3.
- Purvis, June (2002). Emmeline Pankhurst: A Biography. London and New York: Routledge. ISBN 978-0415239783.
- Rosen, Andrew (2013) [1974]. Rise Up, Women! The Militant Campaign of the Women's Social and Political Union, 1903–1914. London: Routledge. ISBN 978-1-136-24754-5.
