= Henria Leech Williams =

British suffragette

Henria Helen Leech Williams
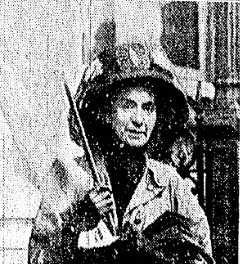
- Henria Williams carrying a WSPU flag outside Leyton Town Hall during the Walthamstow election
- Born: 6 January 1867; Oswestry, Shropshire, England
- Died: 2 January 1911 (aged 43); Corbets Ley, Upminster, England
- Burial place: Cathcart Cemetery Glasgow, Scotland
- Known for: Suffragette activism

Henria Leech Williams (6 January 1867 – 2 January 1911) was a British suffragette, who organised local meetings and attended suffrage demonstrations. She died two months after the 'Black Friday' demonstration, probably as a result of an underlying health condition being aggravated by the violent treatment she received.

== Early life and family ==
Henria Helen Leech Williams was born in Oswestry, Shropshire, in January 1867, to Henria Helen Williams (née Leech), a governess and school mistress. Her father Henry Williams worked as a Railway Signal Engineer. Williams was one of eight children and her maternal grandfather was the 'Primitive Methodist' Minister, Henry Leech.

The family lived for some time in Nantwich, Cheshire. However, between 1881 and 1886, they moved to Cathcart, Glasgow where her father established the Henry Williams Railway Appliance Works. Census records from 1891 show the then 24 year old Henria living with her parents at Albert Road, Cathcart. By 1901, however, she had moved to The Peak Hydro, Buxton, Derbyshire, where she was recorded as a "boarder living on her own means".

Henria's mother died in 1904, leaving a bequest which included stocks and shares in several railway companies and South African diamond mines. Her will stipulated that "money left to her daughters was to remain outside the control of any future husbands".

In 1905, Williams moved to the village of Corbets Ley, Upminster. She purchased 'The Cottage' (now a grade II listed building), which until four years earlier had been a pub named 'The George'. It was a substantial home with three public rooms, four bedrooms, an attic, cellar, and outlying structures including a glasshouse, a stable, and a new two-bed cottage for her coachman, David Scott. The Cottage drawing room was described as having a notable "carved wood mantel & overmantel".

== Role in suffrage movement ==
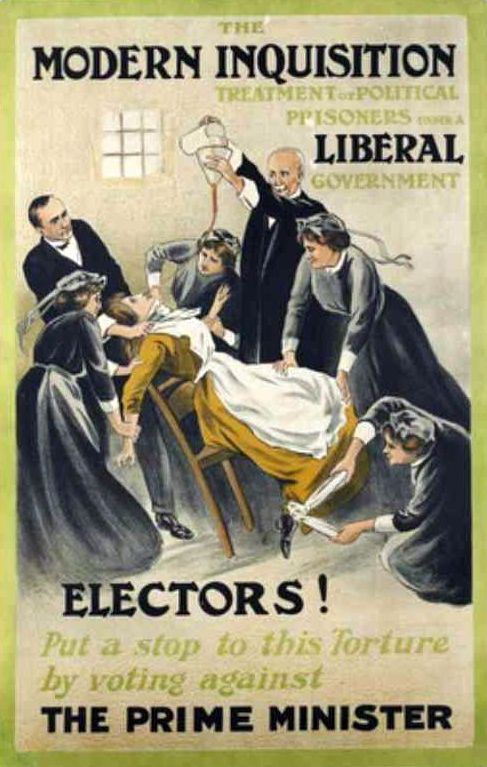
Example of a poster against force feeding

Williams strongly supported the cause of votes for women, and was known to have worn the suffragette colours of violet, white, and green. She was seen locally as a "rather eccentric lady": when in conversation "she poured forth a torrent of eloquence with great vivacity", and when listening to others in a meeting "she could not conceal her enthusiasm". She was a distinctive presence at meetings as "her naturally excitable temperament found extensive scope in frantic enthusiasm, for which she was remarkable". She also displayed large posters outside her house showing the torturous force-feeding of imprisoned suffragettes.

Williams convened a local meeting on 28 November 1905, to hear from the leaders of the Women's Freedom League with Violet or Irene Tillard, and Alice Schofield speaking. Williams was inspired to join larger events in the protest movement in London, taking part in canvassing and other demonstrations.

On 29 June 1909, Williams was among over 100 women arrested with the Women's Social and Political Union leader Emmeline Pankhurst and Emily Wilding Davison for attempting to enter the House of Commons. At their hearing at Bow Street Police Court on 9 July, the cases against Williams and others charged with obstruction were adjourned indefinitely, but 14 of the protesters were imprisoned for smashing windows of government buildings.

Williams also took part in the suffrage demonstration on 18 November 1910, when several hundred women marched to the Houses of Parliament. This demonstration came to be known as Black Friday due to the violent response, including sexual violence, from police and a mob of bystanders. In her own words:

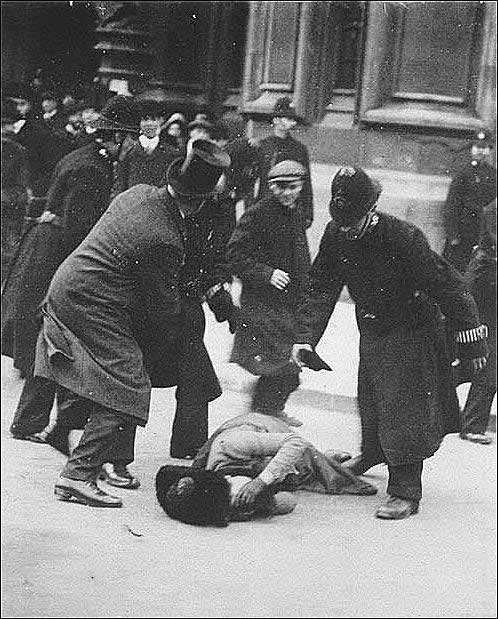
Violent attack on a woman during the Black Friday protest, 18 November 1910 (Williams not pictured)

One policeman after knocking me about for a considerable time, finally took hold of me with his great strong hand like iron just over my heart. He hurt me so much that at first I had not the voice power to tell him what he was doing. But I knew that unless I made a strong effort to do so he would kill me. So collecting all the power of my being, I commanded him to take his hand off my heart. Yet that policeman would not arrest me and he was the third or fourth who had knocked me about. The two first after pinching my arms, kicking my feet, and squeezing and hurting me in different ways, made me think that at last they had arrested me, but they each one only finally took me to the edge of the thick crowd, and then without mercy forced me into the midst of it, and with the crowd pushing in the opposite direction for a few minutes I doubted if I could keep my consciousness, and my breath had gone long before they finally left me in the crowd...Finally, I was so exhausted that I could not go out again with the last batch that same evening. Although I had no limbs broken, still my arms, sides, and ankles were sore for days afterwards. But that was not so bad as the inward shaking and exhaustion I felt. One gentleman on the first day rescued me three times. After the third time, he said to the policeman, who happened to be the same one each time, "Are you going to arrest this lady, or are you going to kill her?" But he did not arrest me, but he actually left me alone for some time after that.

Her rescuer, Frank Whitty, later wrote a letter on his shame at the violent treatment of women instead of arrests by policy, in the WSPU newsletter Votes for Women, as follows:

I saw ... sights that made me feel ashamed of my country; one of the cruelist cases was that of a brave lady ... in a semi-fainting condition, so much so that she could hardly stand. Time after time, with a courage that should have shamed the police into doing their obvious duty and arresting her, she attempted to get through the cordon. I went to her side to do what I could to help and uphold her in her brave but hopeless struggle. At first I tried to persuade her to leave the crowd [but]... realised her determination to "do or die" ... All I could do was to try and help her to the best of my power and to ward off the blows, kicks and insults as I could from her fainting body ... Time after time we were forced back into the crowd by the police with an amount of violence and brutality entirely unnecessary. On these occasions I had to put my arm around her to keep her from falling under the feet of the horses, or worse still, under the crowd.

Undaunted, the following Tuesday, 22 November 1910, Williams joined a delegation to protest to Mr. Asquith, the Prime Minister, outside 10 Downing Street. When they met him en route, it is claimed in some reports that Williams hit Asquith's face saying "You tax women as heavily as men, yet women are not represented in Parliament". Other reports simply refer to a fleeting conversation which was halted "before she could say much" when a policeman whistled for a cab to escort Asquith, "much to the chagrin of the discontented suffragette". Williams allegedly managed to smash a window in the cab before it moved away and was dragged off shouting "Traitor!" and "Coward".

== Death and legacy ==
By Christmas 1910, Williams was alone at home in The Cottage. Her maid had resigned and had not been replaced as Williams was arranging to join a tax-resistance campaign and give up tenancy of the property. Her coachman, however, continued to live on the grounds. On New Year's Day 1911, a Sunday, Williams went to church and spoke with friends cheerfully relating that a relative was also joining the women's movement. At 3:00 a.m. the following day, a passing policeman "heard groans and a cry for assistance" and entered the house with the coachman through a window, finding Williams "in extremis". Williams died on 2 January 1911, and a coroner's inquest took place at her home the next day. Reverend Hyla Henry Holden was the jury foreman and the verdict was 'death by angina pectoris'. The press concluded that Williams taking part in suffragette militancy could be seen as "conduct not at all congenial to one who suffered from a weak heart".

As Williams's death was only two months after 'Black Friday', it was attributed by the suffragette movement as due to the brutal treatment she endured then. She had written to a brother only days before stating that she was still feeling the effects of that day. Henry Brailsford, a Yorkshire-born journalist, and Dr Jessie Murray, who in 1918 was among the founders of the first psychotherapy clinic in Britain, included a letter from Henria Williams to Dr. Murray dated 27 December 1910, five days before her death. Brailsford and Murray concluded in their February 1911 pamphlet "Treatment of the Women's Deputations by the Police". Excerpts were also published in Votes for Women.

There is evidence to show that Miss Henria Williams, who died suddenly of heart failure on January 1, had been used with great brutality, and was aware at the time of the effect upon her heart, which was weak.

Williams's obituary notes:

She showed marvellous courage, but was terribly knocked about and came back to Caxton Hall [site of the famous Women's Parliament] ... with face and lips blackened by suffocation, the result of a severe heart attack.

Her brother Llewellyn – who supported her campaigning – wrote:

She knowingly and willingly shortened her days in rendering services to the womanhood of the nation.

Williams had the suffragette colours draping her coffin, and a wreath saying 'She hath done what she could,' and as it went to the St. Pancras Station midnight train to Glasgow, suffragettes came to pay respects. Soon after, in memory of Williams, on 15 January 1911, a Picea Pungens Glauca tree, was planted in Annie's Arboretum in the garden of the Blathwayt's home Eagle House, Batheaston, by fellow activist Annie Kenney.

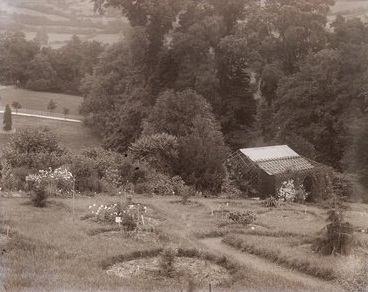
Annie's arboretum and the Suffragettes' Nest at Eagle House, Batheaston c.1910

The plaque read "In memory of Henriette (sic) Williams, injured while on a deputation to the Prime Minister, November 18, 1910; died January 2, 1911". This many years later inspired a creative writing story about the valour of the imprisonment of suffragettes.

Williams was buried in the family lair in Cathcart Cemetery in Glasgow, with the inscription "Henria Helen Leech. Born 6th January, 1867, died 2nd January, 1911."

=== Grave and activism rediscovered ===
Williams' legacy and tomb had fallen out of common knowledge, until Volunteer Archivist and Researcher Ian McCracken contacted the "Friends of Cathcart Cemetery" and advised them of the Scottish connection.

It was noted that Williams' funeral had been attended by key leaders from the British suffrage movement, and there was a first-hand description of Williams' funeral by fellow suffragette Ruth Underwood in Votes for Women:

[It] was most touching and impressive... Although you had written me that flags had been sent from Clement's Inn [the London HQ of WSPU], I do not think that any of us realised that we should see them in the church. For myself, I cannot describe the thrill I felt when the coffin was carried up the aisle covered with our purple, white and green. There were only two wreaths upon it, the one you sent from Clement's Inn and a cross of green with white lilies and broad purple ribbon sent from the Glasgow [WSPU] Union."

After a short church service, the funeral party drove to Cathcart Cemetery, where a second service was held by the open grave. Underwood wrote:

After the grave was filled in, I had a special privilege... It is the custom here for each mourner to place on the grave the wreath which she sent, and I was asked to place the suffrage wreaths on the grave. [...] As I stood by Mr Williams [Henria's brother] afterwards, he said, 'This is quite a soldier's funeral.' I answered, 'It should be, she was as brave as any soldier'.
