= Julia Turner =

Julia Turner may refer to:

- Julia Turner (journalist) (born c. 1979), American journalist and critic
- Julia Turner (psychoanalyst) (1863–1946), British psychoanalyst and suffragette
- Lana Turner (Julia Jean Turner, 1921–1995), American actress
- Lynn Turner (murderer) (Julia Lynn Turner, 1968–2010), American convicted murderer

== See also ==
- Julie Turner, American diplomat
- Julian Turner (born 1955), British poet and mental health worker
