= Women's History Review =

- Language: English
- Edited by: June Purvis

Publication details
- Publisher: Taylor and Francis
- Frequency: Bimonthly
- Impact factor: 0.5 (2023)

Standard abbreviations
- ISO 4: Women's Hist. Rev.

Indexing
- ISSN: 0961-2025 (print); 1747-583X (web)
- OCLC no.: 25943278

Links
- Journal homepage; Online access; Online archive

Women's History Review is a bimonthly peer-reviewed academic journal of women's history published by Routledge. The editor-in-chief is June Purvis (University of Portsmouth) and Sharon Crozier-De Rosa is deputy editor.

== Abstracting and indexing ==
The journal is abstracted and indexed in

- America: History and Life
- British Humanities Index
- CSA Worldwide Political Science Abstracts
- Historical Abstracts
- Sociological Abstracts
- Studies on Women and Gender Abstracts
- Arts & Humanities Citation Index.
