= Julia Turner (psychoanalyst) =

British psychoanalyst and suffragette

- Born: 1863; Dagenham, Essex, England
- Died: 1946 (aged 82–83)
- Occupation: Psychoanalyst

Julia Turner (1863–1946) was a British psychoanalyst and suffragette. She was born in Essex in 1863 and studied classics at University College London, where she graduated in 1889.

After four years as a co-principal of a girls' school in Godalming, Surrey, Turner and her close friend Jessie Murray opened the Medico-Psychological Clinic in 1913, a pioneering entity that provided psychological evaluation and treatment, affordable for middle-class families. Several of the staff who worked and trained at the clinic became leading psychoanalysts. The clinic closed down in 1922, two years after Murray's death, as a result of political in-fighting and financial problems.

Turner continued practising psychotherapy and training and published three works on the subject in the 1920s. She died in 1946 and her ashes were scattered on Murray's grave in Highgate Cemetery.

== Biography ==
=== Early life and education, 1863–1913 ===
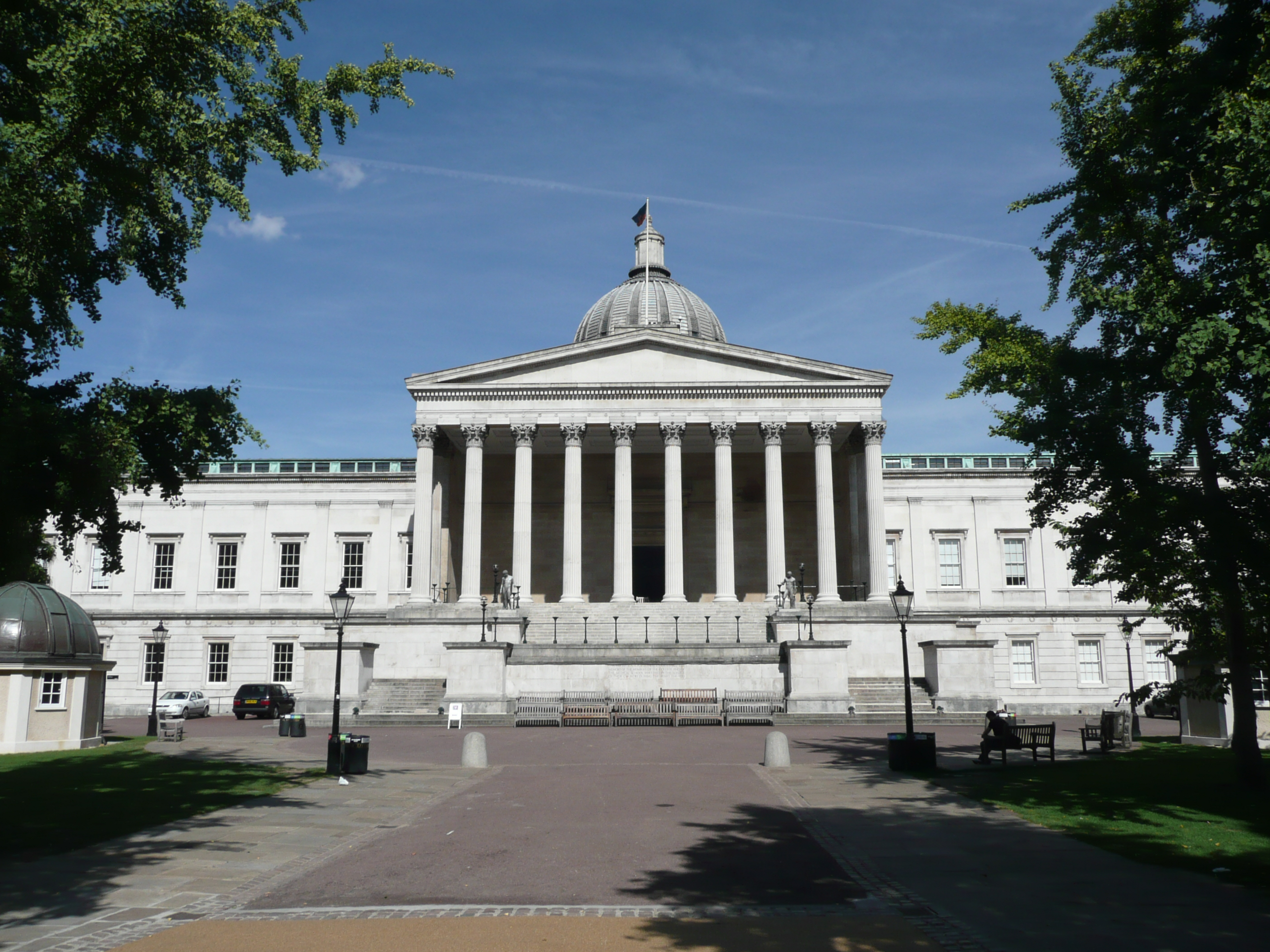
University College London, where Turner studied

Julia Turner was born in Dagenham, Essex, in 1863. She was the middle child of seven born to Marianne (née Venton) Turner and her husband Alfred, a solicitor. (Note: In 1892 the family moved to Twickenham. One of Turner's sisters later occupied the property.) Turner studied classics at University College London, where she graduated in 1889 with a BA.

In 1898 Turner met Jessie Murray, who was studying at the College of Preceptors. The two formed a close friendship; Elizabeth Valentine, Murray's biographer, considers the relationship was an "intimate friendship ... that showed many of the signs of a life partnership". The psychotherapist Marion Bower considers the two were probably a lesbian couple. Turner gave Murray private tuition in preparation for taking—and passing—the first stage examinations of the college in 1899.

Between 1900 and 1904 Turner was the co-principal of Fir Grove House Ladies' School, in Godalming, Surrey. An advertisement in Craddock's Godalming Almanac and Directory showed the institution described itself as "a high-class private school which aims at giving a liberal education to the daughters of gentlemen". (Note: Craddock's Godalming Almanac and Directory, 1900, quoted in Valentine 2009, p. 146.)

=== Medico-Psychological Clinic, 1913–1921 ===
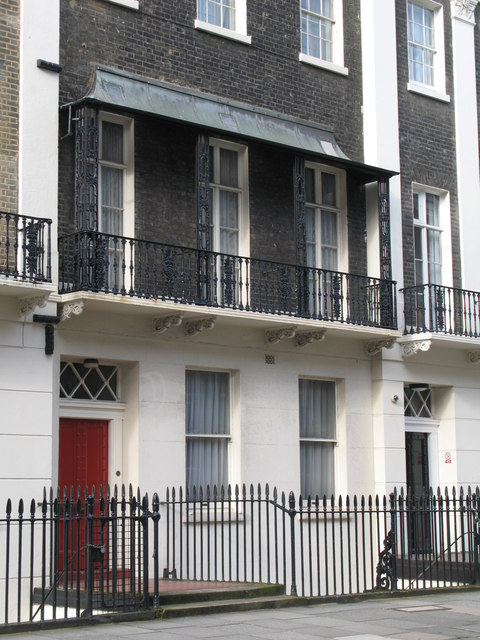
14 Endsleigh Street, London, where Turner and Murray lived, and where they established the Medico-Psychological Clinic

By 1913 Murray and Turner were living at 14 Endsleigh Street, London. Murray was working as a consulting physician at a clinic when they decided to establish the Medico-Psychological Clinic in Endsleigh Street. The clinic was one of the first psychotherapeutic consultancies in Britain. Initially the clinic operated informally, opening only three afternoons a week, offering its services to those who could not afford an alternative; one of the clinic's aims was to provide treatment that could be afforded by middle-class patients.

The practice soon grew and in July 1914, after it received a £500 donation from the writer May Sinclair, the clinic moved to its own premises at 30 Brunswick Square, London. (Note: £500 in 1914 is approximately equivalent to £49,900 in 2025, according to calculations based on the Consumer Price Index measure of inflation.) The clinic used a variety of psychiatric methods and disciplines at a time when psychological experimentation was booming; the clinic called its approach "orthopsychics". As psychology was underdeveloped as a science at the time, there was a focus on recruiting from those with a general education, rather than with specialist psychiatric training. From July 1915 the clinic began a training programme for psychotherapists by forming a sister organisation, the Society for the Study of Orthopsychics. This was the first course in England for training psychoanalysts. Part of the training included students having to undergo their own therapy, a requirement that was later adopted by the International Psychoanalytical Association.

The clinic initially focused on treating women patients, but as the First World War progressed they began admitting men too. In April 1917 the clinic expanded into a neighbouring house to provide an in-patient facility for rehabilitating soldiers suffering from shell shock. By 1919 a third adjacent house was occupied by the clinic. To raise funds to treat the increasing number of servicemen entering treatment, the clinic published a brochure, entitled "Special Appeal in Time of War", which described its approach:

... in providing certain newer forms of treatment, the utility of which in the kind of cases indicated has frequently been demonstrated, but which for lack of suitable conditions have so far only been accessible to a very limited number of sufferers. These forms of treatment are often referred to collectively as Psychotherapy and include the various forms of mental analysis, and re-synthesis which are known as Psychological Analysis (Janet, Morton Prince, &c.), Psycho-Analysis (Freud and Jung, &c.), and as Therapeutic Conversation and Persuasion (Dejerine, Dubois, &c.), Re-Education and Suggestion in the hypnoidal and hypnotic state.

Turner joined many of the professional networks associated with her field. In July 1915 she and Murray founded the Society for the Study of Orthopsychics and she was also a member of the British Society for the Study of Sex Psychology, the Society for Psychical Research and the British Association for the Advancement of Science.

In 1919 Murray was diagnosed with ovarian cancer and retired from the clinic. Her position of co-director was taken by James Glover, who had joined the practice in 1918. He was medically trained and interested in psychoanalysis and had been rejected from military service because of his diabetes. Murray died on 25 September 1920, aged 53; she left her estate to Turner, who she also named as the executrix.

=== Later life, 1921–1946 ===
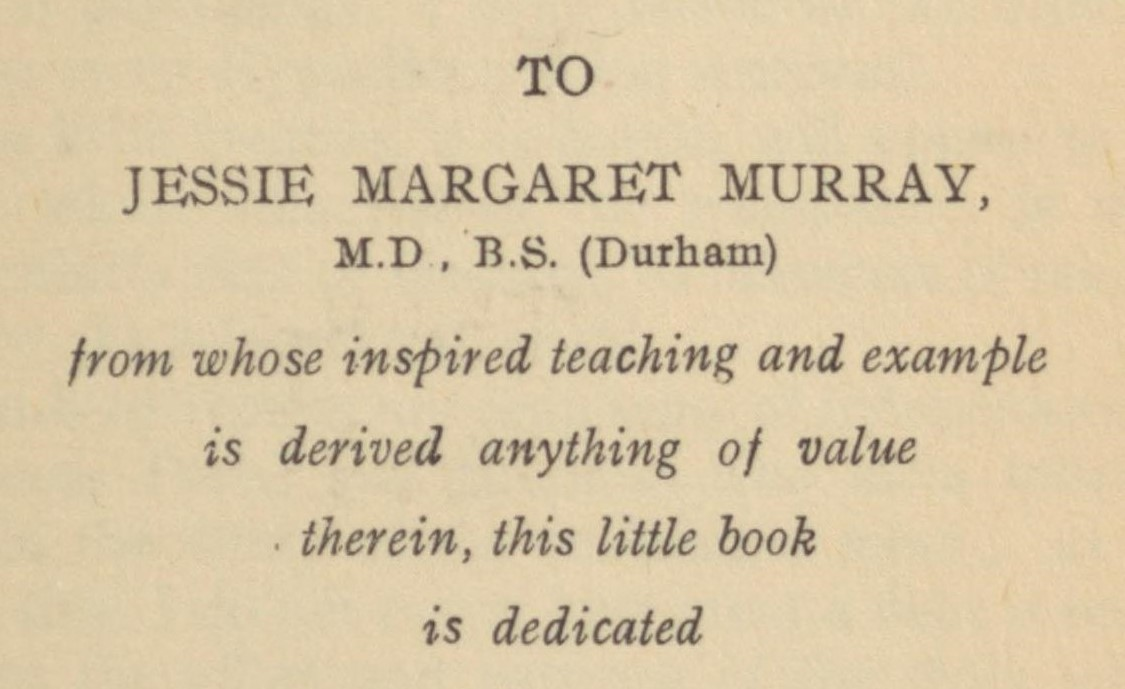
Dedication in Julia Turner's The Psychology of Self-Consciousness, addressed to Murray

After a split in the Society for the Study of Orthopsychics, Turner resigned and founded the Psychological Aid Society on 26 September 1921, with the headquarters in her residence in Endsleigh Street.

The presence of James Glover (older brother to Edward) as a senior member of staff was part of the reason the clinic eventually closed down. In 1921 Glover travelled to Berlin for several months' training and analysis with the German psychoanalyst Karl Abraham—a student and collaborator of Sigmund Freud. During his study he became a devotee of the Freudian school of analysis and returned to Britain determined to change the way the clinic was run. His brother Edward later described the "missionary zeal" with which his brother approached the task, banning any treatment except those on Freudian lines. The clinic had previously been run on non-partisan lines, using whichever discipline was deemed best for the patient, alongside medical treatment and changes in diet and exercise—although Murray, Turner and Sinclair had a personal preference for using Jungian analysis.

By 1922 Glover left the clinic with some of the staff and students, essentially splitting the clinic, causing Turner to close it. Many of those staff who had not followed Glover joined the Tavistock Clinic. The clinic's finances were also unsound at the time of the closure, and it had debts of over £1,000 when the controlling company was liquidated. The hostel for shell-shocked soldiers was a large drain on finances. There were no endowments or major sponsors to keep it running, and charitable funding after the war was scant.

After the closure of the clinic, Turner returned to her residence at Endsleigh Street and opened a practice that aimed to return to the charitable basis of their original clinic. She also continued to train students. She published three books on psychology: The Psychology of Self-Consciousness (1923), The Dream and the Anxiety Hypothesis (1923) and Human Psychology as seen through the Dream (1924). The dedication in The Psychology of Self-Consciousness reads "To Jessie Margaret Murray M.D., B.S. (Durham) from whose inspired teaching and example is derived anything of value therein, this little book is dedicated." Turner died in 1946; her will closed with the words "It is my desire that my body be cremated and my ashes scattered upon the grave of my said dear friend Jessie Margaret Murray in Highgate Cemetery".

== Notes and references ==
=== Sources ===
==== Books ====
- Bower, Marion (2019). The Life and Work of Joan Riviere: Freud, Klein and Female Sexuality. London: Routledge. ISBN 978-0-4155-0768-4.
- Hayward, Rhodri (2014). The Transformation of the Psyche in British Primary Care, 1870–1970. London: Bloomsbury. ISBN 978-1-7809-3726-7.
- Robinson, Ken (2023). "Ella Sharpe: Being Independent, following Freud". In Wolf, Elizabeth; Antonis, Barbie (eds.). Independent Women in British Psychoanalysis: Creativity and Authenticity at Work. Abingdon, Oxfordshire: Routledge. pp. 120–133. ISBN 978-1-0322-8403-3.
- Showalter, Elaine (1987). The Female Malady: Women, Madness and English Culture 1830-1980. London: Virago. ISBN 978-0-86068-869-3.
- Turner, Julia (1923). The Psychology of Self-Consciousness. London: Kegan Paul, Trench Trubner. OCLC 909226450.
- Valentine, Elizabeth R. (2014). Philosophy and History of Psychology: Selected Works of Elizabeth Valentine. London: Psychology Press. ISBN 978-1-8487-2-274-3.

==== Journals ====
- Alexander, Sally (Spring 1998). "Psychoanalysis in Britain in the Early Twentieth Century: An Introductory Note". History Workshop Journal (45): 135–143. doi:10.1093/hwj/1998.45.135. JSTOR 4289553. PMID 11620086.
- Boll, Theophilus E. M. (22 August 1962). "May Sinclair and the Medico-Psychological Clinic of London". Proceedings of the American Philosophical Society. 106 (4): 310–326. JSTOR 985265.
- Cassullo, Gabriele (3 July 2014). "Charles Rycroft and the Making of an Independent Psychoanalyst: Translated by Alice Spencer". Contemporary Psychoanalysis. 50 (3): 332–370. doi:10.1080/00107530.2014.895279. S2CID 143330272.
- Hinshelwood, R. D. (January 1998). "The Organizing of Psychoanalysis in Britain". Psychoanalysis and History. 1 (1): 87–102. doi:10.3366/pah.1999.1.1.87. PMID 22081844.
- "Jessie Margaret Murray, M.D., B.S.Durham". The British Medical Journal. 2 (3123): 723. 6 November 1920. doi:10.1136/bmj.2.3123.723-a. JSTOR 20425661. PMC 2338493. S2CID 220230826.
- Jones, Ernest (1927). "James Glover, 1882–1926". The International Journal of Psychoanalysis. 8: 1–9.
- Martindale, Philippa (July 2004). "'Against All Hushing up and Stamping Down': The Medico-Psychological Clinic of London and the Novelist May Sinclair". Psychoanalysis and History. 6 (2): 177–200. doi:10.3366/pah.2004.6.2.177. PMID 21850804.
- Raitt, Suzanne (Autumn 2004). "Early British Psychoanalysis and the Medico-Psychological Clinic". History Workshop Journal. 58 (58): 63–85. doi:10.1093/hwj/58.1.63. JSTOR 25472754. PMID 15499690. S2CID 19911730.
- Valentine, Elizabeth R. (9 April 2009). "'A brilliant and many-sided personality': Jessie Margaret Murray, founder of the Medico-Psychological Clinic". Journal of the History of the Behavioral Sciences. 45 (2): 145–161. doi:10.1002/jhbs.20364. PMID 19360892.
- Valentine, Elizabeth R. (November 2018). "Early Women Members of the British Psychological Society: Challenges and Achievements". History & Philosophy of Psychology. 19 (1): 17–25. doi:10.53841/bpshpp.2018.19.1.17. S2CID 255927431.

==== Websites ====
- Clark, Gregory (2023). "The Annual RPI and Average Earnings for Britain, 1209 to Present (New Series)". MeasuringWorth.
