= Jessie Murray =

British psychoanalyst and suffragette (1867–1920)

- Born: 9 February 1867; Hazaribagh, British India
- Died: 25 September 1920 (aged 53); Twickenham, London, England
- Education: London School of Medicine for Women; University of Durham (MB, BS)
- Occupation: Psychoanalyst

Jessie Margaret Murray (9 February 1867 – 25 September 1920) was a British psychoanalyst and suffragette. Born in India, she moved to the UK when she was 13. She undertook studies in medicine with the College of Preceptors and Worshipful Society of Apothecaries and at the University of Durham and University College London. She also attended lectures by the French psychologist Pierre Janet at the Collège de France, Paris.

Murray was a member of the Women's Freedom League and Women's Tax Resistance League, two organisations that took direct action in their campaigns for women's suffrage. In 1910 she and the journalist Henry Brailsford took statements from the suffragettes who had been mistreated during the Black Friday demonstrations in November that year. Their published memorandum was presented to the Home Office, along with a formal request for a public inquiry. The Home Secretary, Winston Churchill, refused to establish one.

After practising medicine from 1909, Murray and her close friend Julia Turner opened the Medico-Psychological Clinic in 1913, a pioneering entity that provided psychological evaluation and treatment, affordable for middle-class families. Several of the staff who worked and trained at the clinic became leading psychoanalysts. Murray was awarded an MD by the University of Durham in 1919. Shortly afterwards she was diagnosed with ovarian cancer; she died in September 1920, aged 53.

The clinic Murray founded closed down in 1922 as a result of political in-fighting and financial problems. During its nine years of existence, through its training programme, it laid the foundation of psychological evaluation in the UK. Its practice of having students undergo their own therapy was later adopted by the International Psychoanalytical Association.

== Early life, education and professional training: 1867–1915 ==
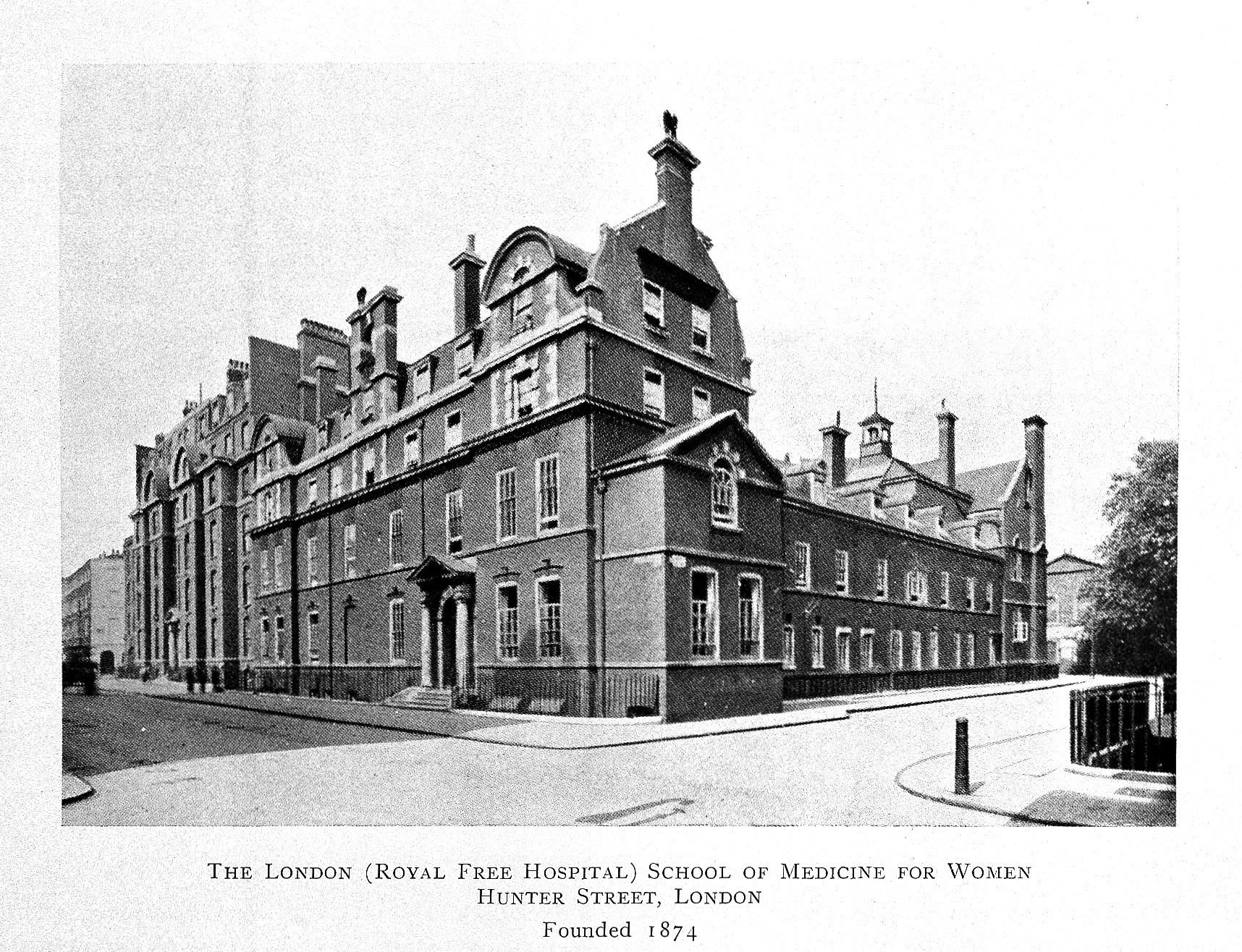
The London School of Medicine for Women, where Murray studied

Jessie Margaret Murray was born in Hazaribagh, British India, on 9 February 1867 to Hugh Hildyard Murray, a lieutenant of the Royal Artillery, and Frances Jane Murray. The couple also had two younger daughters while in India, Mary Ethel and Edith May. In about 1880 Frances Murray and her children travelled to Edinburgh, where they settled; by 1891 they were living in London. Five years later the family was living in Bayswater, West London, when Hugh, then a retired colonel, died.

In 1898 Murray met Julia Turner, who was completing an undergraduate degree in classics at University College London. The two formed a close friendship; Elizabeth Valentine, Murray's biographer, considers the relationship was an "intimate friendship ... that showed many of the signs of a life partnership". The psychotherapist Marion Bower considers the two were probably a lesbian couple. Turner gave Murray private tuition, and she passed the first stage examinations of the College of Preceptors in 1899. In February 1900 she began studying at the London School of Medicine for Women and then enrolled as a student at the College of Medicine, Newcastle. In June 1908 she passed her examinations to become a Licentiate in Medicine and Surgery of the Worshipful Society of Apothecaries. The following year she was granted the degree of Bachelor of Medicine, Bachelor of Surgery at the University of Durham; her study included the field of psychological medicine. Some time later Murray attended the lectures of the French psychologist Pierre Janet at the Collège de France, Paris. She also studied at University College London between 1912 and 1915, where she was working towards a D.Sc. in psychology under the tutelage of Charles Spearman.

== Women's suffrage activism ==
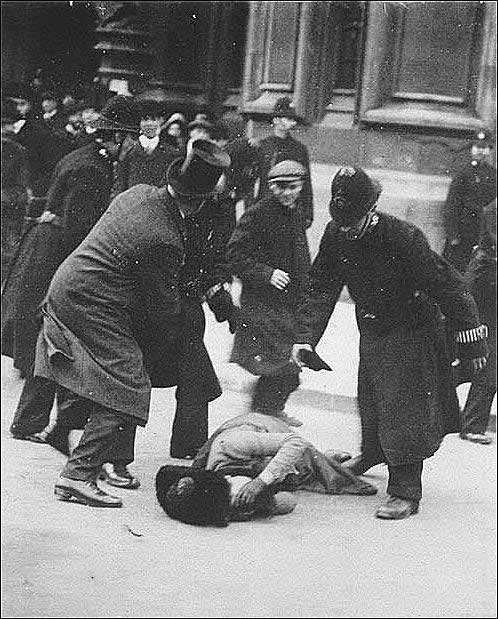
A suffragette on the ground on Black Friday; Murray co-wrote a report on the violence the demonstrators received.

Murray was a member of the Women's Freedom League, a militant organisation for women's suffrage, founded in 1907, which eschewed violence in favour of non-violent tactics; Turner was also a member, and one of Turner's two sisters was a member of the Women's Social and Political Union.

On Black Friday—18 November 1910—a suffragette demonstration of 300 women marchers was treated with violence, some of it sexual, by the Metropolitan Police and bystanders. Murray and the journalist Henry Brailsford collected 135 statements from demonstrators, nearly all of which described acts of violence against the women; 29 of the statements also included details of violence that included sexual indecency. Their findings were published and, in February 1911, their memorandum was presented to the Home Office, along with a formal request for a public inquiry. (Note: The book was published under the aegis of the Conciliation Committee for Woman Suffrage as The Treatment of the Women's Deputations of November 18th, 22nd and 23rd, 1910 by the Police.) The Home Secretary, Winston Churchill, refused to establish one.

From at least April 1910 Murray was a member of the Women's Tax Resistance League, a direct action organisation that used tax resistance to protest against the lack of votes for women. Murray hosted group meetings at her house and, in 1911, had property seized by bailiffs for non-payment of her taxes. She wrote on her demand "I, a member of the Tax Resistance League, hereby declare that I have conscientious objections to paying King's taxes so long as women are denied the suffrage. I maintain that taxation without representation is unconstitutional." Her debts were covered by the sale of a sideboard and chairs, although she refused to allow her property to be purchased back by her friends. In 1913 Murray donated 10s 6d to the Tax Resistance League; such funds were often used by the League to buy back seized property. (Note: 10s 6d in 1911 is approximately equivalent to £50 in 2025, according to calculations based on the Consumer Price Index measure of inflation.)

== Medico-Psychological Clinic ==
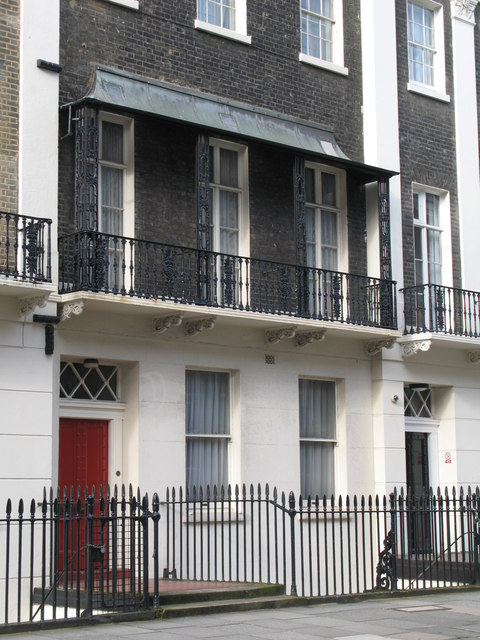
14 Endsleigh Street, London, where Murray and Turner lived, and where they established the Medico-Psychological Clinic

From 1912 to 1914 Murray worked as a consulting physician at the Quinton Polyclinic, where they treated gastroenteritis in infants, eczema and other skin diseases by isotonised seawater. In 1913, while Murray was still consulting at the Polyclinic, she and Turner established the Medico-Psychological Clinic at 14 Endsleigh Street, London, where they both lived. The clinic was one of the first psychotherapeutic consultancies in Britain. Initially the clinic operated informally, opening only three afternoons a week, offering its services to those who could not afford an alternative; one of the clinic's aims was to provide treatment that could be afforded by middle-class patients.

The practice soon grew and in July 1914 the clinic moved to its own premises at 30 Brunswick Square, London, after they received a £500 donation from the writer May Sinclair. (Note: £500 in 1914 is approximately equivalent to £49,900 in 2025, according to calculations based on the Consumer Price Index measure of inflation.) The clinic used a variety of psychiatric methods and disciplines at a time when psychological experimentation was booming; the clinic called its approach "orthopsychics". As psychology was underdeveloped as a science at the time, there was a focus on recruiting from those with a general education, rather than with specialist psychiatric training. From July 1915 the clinic began a training programme for psychotherapists by forming a sister organisation, the Society for the Study of Orthopsychics. This was the first course in England for training psychoanalysts. Part of the training included students having to undergo their own therapy, a requirement that was later adopted by the International Psychoanalytical Association.

The clinic initially focused on treating women patients, but as the First World War progressed they began admitting men too. In April 1917 the clinic expanded into a neighbouring house to provide an in-patient facility for rehabilitating soldiers suffering from shell shock. By 1919 a third adjacent house was occupied by the clinic. To raise funds to treat the increasing number of servicemen entering treatment, the clinic published a brochure, entitled "Special Appeal in Time of War", which described its approach:

... in providing certain newer forms of treatment, the utility of which in the kind of cases indicated has frequently been demonstrated, but which for lack of suitable conditions have so far only been accessible to a very limited number of sufferers. These forms of treatment are often referred to collectively as Psychotherapy and include the various forms of mental analysis, and re-synthesis which are known as Psychological Analysis (Janet, Morton Prince, &c.), Psycho-Analysis (Freud and Jung, &c.), and as Therapeutic Conversation and Persuasion (Dejerine, Dubois, &c.), Re-Education and Suggestion in the hypnoidal and hypnotic state.

Murray joined many of the professional networks associated with her field, and became a member of the British Medical Association, the Association of Registered Medical Women, the Psycho-Medical Society, the Medico-Psychological Association, the Royal Society of Medicine, the Society for Psychical Research, the British Association for the Advancement of Science (BAAS) and the Psychological Society. She was an early member of the British Society for the Study of Sex Psychology and spoke at the society's first quarterly meeting in January 1915 on "The Evolution of the Instincts".

== Final years ==
In 1915 Murray met Marie Stopes, the pioneer in the field of family planning, at a BAAS meeting in Manchester, where both women presented papers. The two corresponded and attended the same medical meetings. In 1918 Stopes published her book Married Love, A New Contribution to the Solution of Sex Difficulties; Murray wrote the preface, in which she states:

The age-long conflict between the "lower" and the "higher" impulses, between the primitive animal nature and the specifically human developments of an altruistic and ethical order, are fought afresh in each soul and in every marriage.

We need to realise more clearly that the lower is never—ought never to be—eliminated but rather subsumed by the higher. No true harmony can be hoped for so long as one factor or the other is ignored or repressed.

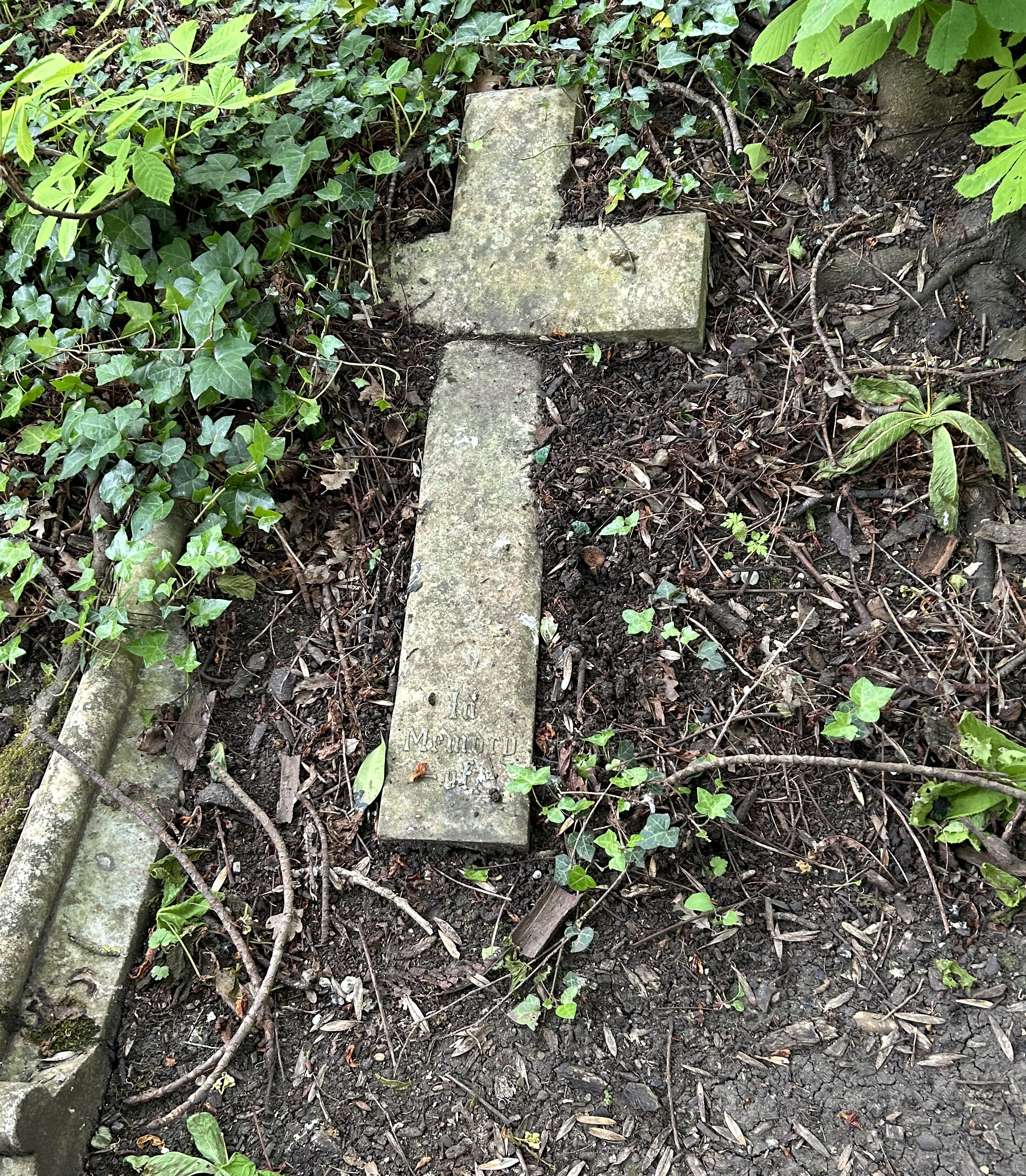
Murray's grave in Highgate Cemetery

In July 1919 Murray was awarded an MD by the University of Durham. Her thesis was on "Nervous Functional Diseases from the Point of View of Modern Clinical Psychology", which, according to Valentine, "discussed the value of psychological discoveries in the treatment and prevention of nervous and mental diseases".

Soon after she was awarded her MD, Murray was diagnosed with ovarian cancer and retired from the clinic. Her position of co-director was taken by James Glover, who had joined the practice in 1918. He was medically trained and interested in psychoanalysis and had been rejected from military service because of his diabetes. Murray wrote her will in July 1919, leaving her estate to Turner, who was also named as the executrix. Murray died on 25 September 1920, aged 53; she was cremated, and her ashes buried in her mother's grave in Highgate Cemetery. Her obituary in The British Medical Journal described her as "a brilliant and many-sided personality". Her obituary in The Vote says "Such women can be ill-spared, but of them all it may be said, their works do follow them."

== Impact ==
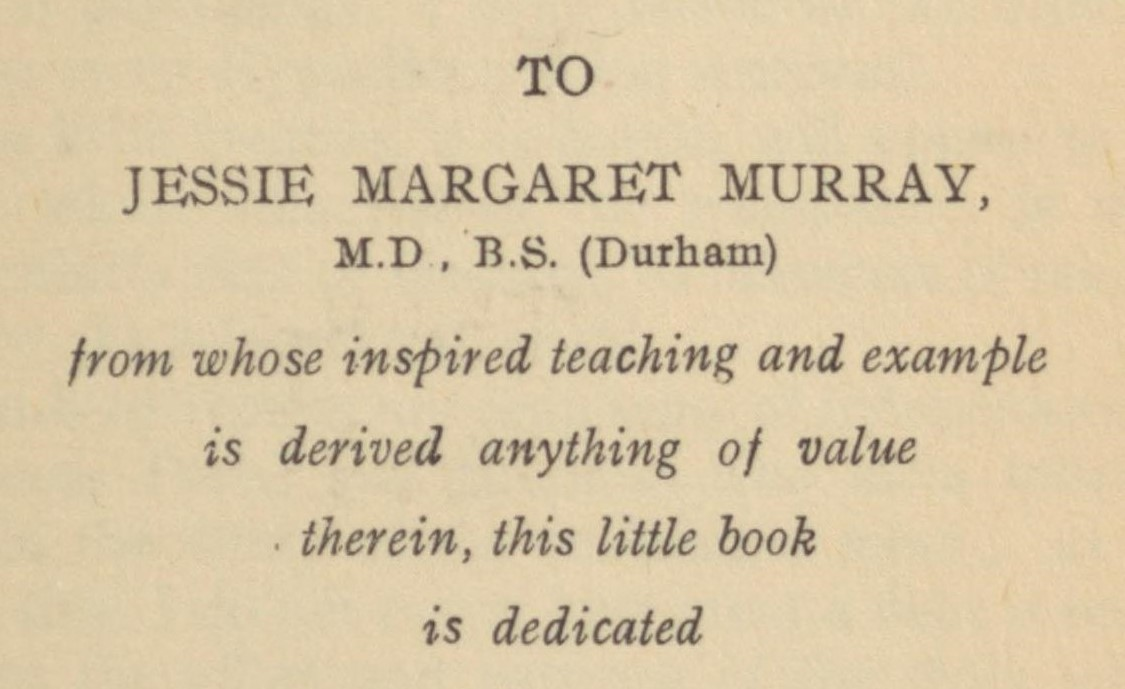
Dedication in Julia Turner's The Psychology of Self-Consciousness, addressed to Murray

The Medico-Psychological Clinic was a pioneering organisation, according to The Institute of Psychoanalysis. The gender studies academic Grace Lavery considers the clinic to have been "an important British landing strip for psychoanalytic thought". Because of the training regime the clinic introduced with the Society for the Study of Orthopsychics, it influenced the next generation of psychoanalysts. Many students and staff became leading psychoanalysts and early members of the British Psychological Society and the Tavistock Clinic. They included Marjorie Brierley, Mary Chadwick, Edward Glover, Susan Isaacs, Barbara Low, Sylvia Payne, Joan Riviere, Nina Searl and Ella Freeman Sharpe.

The presence of James Glover (older brother to Edward) as a senior member of staff was part of the reason the clinic eventually closed down. In 1921 Glover travelled to Berlin for several months training and analysis with the German psychoanalyst Karl Abraham—a student and collaborator of Sigmund Freud. During his study he became a devotee of the Freudian school of analysis and returned to Britain determined to change the way the clinic was run. His brother Edward later described the "missionary zeal" with which his brother approached the task, banning any treatment except those on Freudian lines. The clinic had previously been run on non-partisan lines, using whichever discipline was deemed best for the patient, alongside medical treatment and changes in diet and exercise—although Murray, Turner and Sinclair had a personal preference for using Jungian analysis.

The feminist writer Elaine Showalter sees the closure of the clinic as "a striking illustration of the way that male professionalism could crush the early experimentation of women in psychoanalysis". Glover also tried to get the clinic allied with the British Psychoanalytical Society (BPS) formed by Ernest Jones. Jones—also a follower of Freudian practices—was dismissive of the clinic and Murray, to the point that he was disingenuous in his description of the practice. He was also keen on closing it down; in 1920 he wrote to friends that the clinic had a "bad repute in the medical profession", and continued "all the therapists ... lay, ... [but] mostly women, and often badly neurotic women". Turner refused to join the BPS and the clinic split; Glover left with some of the staff and students.

By 1922 Turner closed the clinic. Many of those who had not followed Glover joined the Tavistock Clinic. The clinic's finances were also unsound at the time of the closure, and it had debts of over £1,000 when the controlling company was liquidated. The hostel for shell-shocked soldiers was a large drain on finances. There were no endowments or major sponsors to keep it running, and charitable funding after the war was scant.

After the closure of the clinic, Turner returned to her residence at Endsleigh Street and opened a practice. She published three books on psychology: The Psychology of Self-Consciousness (1923), The Dream and the Anxiety Hypothesis (1923) and Human Psychology as seen through the Dream (1924). The dedication in The Psychology of Self-Consciousness reads "To Jessie Margaret Murray M.D., B.S. (Durham) from whose inspired teaching and example is derived anything of value therein, this little book is dedicated." Turner died in 1946; her will closed with the words "It is my desire that my body be cremated and my ashes scattered upon the grave of my said dear friend Jessie Margaret Murray in Highgate Cemetery".

== Notes and references ==
=== Sources ===
==== Books ====
- Atkinson, Diane (2018). Rise Up Women!: The Remarkable Lives of the Suffragettes. London: Bloomsbury. ISBN 978-1-4088-4406-9.
- Bower, Marion (2019). The Life and Work of Joan Riviere: Freud, Klein and Female Sexuality. London: Routledge. ISBN 978-0-4155-0768-4.
- Hayward, Rhodri (2014). The Transformation of the Psyche in British Primary Care, 1870–1970. London: Bloomsbury. ISBN 978-1-7809-3726-7.
- Lavery, Grace E. (2023). Pleasure and Efficacy: Of Pen Names, Cover Versions, and Other Trans Techniques. Princeton, New Jersey: Princeton University Press. ISBN 978-0-6912-4393-1.
- Murray, Jessie (1918). Preface. Married Love, A New Contribution to the Solution of Sex Difficulties. By Stopes, Marie. London: A. C. Fifield. pp. vii–ix.
- Robinson, Ken (2023). "Ella Sharpe: Being Independent, following Freud". In Wolf, Elizabeth; Antonis, Barbie (eds.). Independent Women in British Psychoanalysis: Creativity and Authenticity at Work. Abingdon, Oxfordshire: Routledge. pp. 120–133. ISBN 978-1-0322-8403-3.
- Rosen, Andrew (2013). Rise Up, Women!: The Militant Campaign of the Women's Social and Political Union, 1903–1914. London: Routledge. ISBN 978-1-136-24754-5. Archived from the original on 29 October 2023.
- Showalter, Elaine (1987). The Female Malady: Women, Madness and English Culture 1830–1980. London: Virago. ISBN 978-0-86068-869-3.
- Turner, Julia (1923). The Psychology of Self-Consciousness. London: Kegan Paul, Trench Trubner. OCLC 909226450.
- Valentine, Elizabeth R. (2014). Philosophy and History of Psychology: Selected Works of Elizabeth Valentine. London: Psychology Press. ISBN 978-1-8487-2-274-3.

==== Journals ====
- Alexander, Sally (Spring 1998). "Psychoanalysis in Britain in the Early Twentieth Century: An Introductory Note". History Workshop Journal (45): 135–143. doi:10.1093/hwj/1998.45.135. JSTOR 4289553. PMID 11620086.
- Boll, Theophilus E. M. (22 August 1962). "May Sinclair and the Medico-Psychological Clinic of London". Proceedings of the American Philosophical Society. 106 (4): 310–326. JSTOR 985265.
- Cassullo, Gabriele (3 July 2014). "Charles Rycroft and the Making of an Independent Psychoanalyst: Translated by Alice Spencer". Contemporary Psychoanalysis. 50 (3): 332–370. doi:10.1080/00107530.2014.895279. S2CID 143330272.
- Damer, Annie (November 1911). "The Quinton Polyclinic in London". The American Journal of Nursing. 12 (2): 136–137. doi:10.2307/3404325. ISSN 0002-936X. JSTOR 3404325. Archived from the original on 24 August 2023.
- Hall, Lesley A. (October 1995). "'Disinterested Enthusiasm for Sexual Misconduct': The British Society for the Study of Sex Psychology, 1913-47". Journal of Contemporary History. 30 (4): 665–686. doi:10.1177/002200949503000405. JSTOR 261087. S2CID 162262939.
- Hinshelwood, R. D. (January 1998). "The Organizing of Psychoanalysis in Britain". Psychoanalysis and History. 1 (1): 87–102. doi:10.3366/pah.1999.1.1.87. PMID 22081844.
- "Jessie Margaret Murray, M.D., B.S.Durham". The British Medical Journal. 2 (3123): 723. 6 November 1920. doi:10.1136/bmj.2.3123.723-a. JSTOR 20425661. PMC 2338493. S2CID 220230826.
- Jones, Ernest (1927). "James Glover, 1882–1926". The International Journal of Psychoanalysis. 8: 1–9.
- Martindale, Philippa (July 2004). "'Against All Hushing up and Stamping Down': The Medico-Psychological Clinic of London and the Novelist May Sinclair". Psychoanalysis and History. 6 (2): 177–200. doi:10.3366/pah.2004.6.2.177. PMID 21850804.
- Raitt, Suzanne (Autumn 2004). "Early British Psychoanalysis and the Medico-Psychological Clinic". History Workshop Journal. 58 (58): 63–85. doi:10.1093/hwj/58.1.63. JSTOR 25472754. PMID 15499690. S2CID 19911730.
- Tanguay, Chabrian (2026). "Learning From Students: An Inquiry into Charles Spearman's Research Agenda". History of Psychology. 29 (1): 1–19. doi:10.1037/hop0000286.
- Valentine, Elizabeth R. (9 April 2009). "'A brilliant and many-sided personality': Jessie Margaret Murray, founder of the Medico-Psychological Clinic". Journal of the History of the Behavioral Sciences. 45 (2): 145–161. doi:10.1002/jhbs.20364. PMID 19360892.
- Valentine, Elizabeth R. (November 2018). "Early Women Members of the British Psychological Society: Challenges and Achievements". History & Philosophy of Psychology. 19 (1): 17–25. doi:10.53841/bpshpp.2018.19.1.17. S2CID 255927431.

==== News ====
- "A Woman Tax Resister's Goods Sold". The Manchester Guardian. 26 April 1911. p. 14.
- "In Memoriam". The Vote. 22 October 1920. p. 3.

==== Websites ====
- "100 Years of History". The Institute of Psychoanalysis. Archived from the original on 12 August 2023.
- Clark, Gregory (2023). "The Annual RPI and Average Earnings for Britain, 1209 to Present (New Series)". MeasuringWorth. Archived from the original on 23 March 2023.
