= Dorothy Edwards (Welsh novelist) =

Welsh fiction writer in English (1902–1934)

- Born: 18 August 1902; Ogmore Vale, Glamorgan, Wales
- Died: January 5, 1934 (aged 31); Caerphilly, Wales
- Education: University College of South Wales and Monmouthshire
- Known for: Short story writer, novelist

Dorothy Edwards (18 August 1902 – 5 January 1934) was a Welsh short story writer and novelist who wrote in English. She became associated with David Garnett and other members of the Bloomsbury Group, but she stated in her suicide note that she had "accepted kindness and friendship and even love without gratitude, and given nothing in return."

== Early life and education ==
Edwards was born at Ogmore Vale, Glamorgan, Wales, the only child of Vida (née Jones) and Edward Edwards. Her father was headmaster of Tynewydd School, Ogmore Vale, where her mother had also worked before her marriage. He was a significant person in the Independent Labour Party and the British co-operative movement. Through him, Dorothy met notable socialists, including Keir Hardie, George Lansbury and J. Stitt Wilson, with whom she maintained a lifelong correspondence. At nine years old and dressed in red, she welcomed Hardie onto the stage in Tonypandy during the national coal strike of 1912. The same year, her father was hit and injured by a motor car. Keir Hardie wrote to the 9 year old, addressing her as "Dear Little Dorothy Sweetheart" and "Dear Comrade Edwards" in two letters expressing concern for her father's injuries. Her father never fully recovered from the accident and died in 1917.

Dorothy was taught to believe that a revolution was at hand and that class and gender-based divisions would soon crumble; however, as Claire Flay points out, her father's safe and relatively well-paid job set her apart from the rest of the community. Although her parents spoke Welsh, she was not taught the language as a child.

Dorothy won a scholarship to Howell's School for Girls in Llandaff, where she was a boarder. She then read Greek and philosophy at the University College of South Wales and Monmouthshire, predecessor of Cardiff University. Flay places her among a circle of ambitious, unconventional women. By this time her father had died and she lived with her mother in Rhiwbina. A short engagement to her philosophy lecturer, John MacCaig Thorburn, came to a difficult end.

== Writing ==
After graduating, Edwards set aside her early ambition to become an opera singer, though Flay describes her as having an excellent singing voice. Nor did she follow her parents into teaching. She took a part-time, temporary job to augment her mother's pension and continued to work on short stories, three of which – "A Country House", "Summer-time" and "The Conquered" – appeared in The Calendar of Modern Letters. Rhapsody (1927) collected these three stories along with seven others she had written or revised during a nine-month visit to Vienna and Florence with her mother. While in Vienna, she befriended Polish violinist and music teacher Simon Pullman. In 1928 came a short novel, Winter Sonata, which Flay describes as restrained, multi-faceted and structurally innovative, deconstructing social and gender hierarchies in depicting an English village in winter. Both Rhapsody and Winter Sonata describe the marginalization of British women in the interwar period.

In 1929, Edwards became close friends with the Bloomsbury author David Garnett, who dubbed her his "Welsh Cinderella" and introduced her to other Bloomsbury Group members, including the artist Dora Carrington. Between January and June 1933, she lived with Garnett, his wife Ray and their family in Endsleigh Street near the British Museum. In exchange for child care, she lodged in their attic, which gave her space in which to write. The publisher E. E. Wishart offered her an advance on a new volume of stories to include "The Problem of Life", "Mutiny" and "Mitter". However, tensions arose between Garnett and Edwards. London friends grew weary of her outspokenness and the Welsh provincialism they saw in her. Edwards was aware of what was considered her socially inferior position, but still held her father's teachings in reverence and was drawn increasingly to the Welsh nationalist movement. Flay describes her as riddled with guilt at leaving her mother with a hired companion, frustrated at her dependence on the Garnetts, and reeling after a love affair with Ronald Harding, a married Welsh cellist.

== Suicide and posthumous publications ==
On 5 January 1934, having spent the morning burning her letters from John MacCaig Thorburn and possibly an unfinished novel, Edwards threw herself in front of a train near Caerphilly railway station. She left a suicide note: "I am killing myself because I have never sincerely loved any human being all my life. I have accepted kindness and friendship and even love without gratitude, and given nothing in return." She was cremated at Glyntaff, Pontypridd, on 9 January. Her mother died later that year.

Mutiny was published in Life and Letters in September 1933 shortly before her death, in a volume edited by Desmond MacCarthy and Hamish Miles. The Problem of Life followed a few months later, also in Life and Letters To-day. Edwards's works were largely forgotten, although critic Beryl Jones wrote an article about her in The Welsh Review in 1948*.

In 1986, Virago Press reissued Rhapsody and Winter Sonatas with introductions by Elaine Morgan, although Jones challenged the veracity of these in a pointed letter to Virago. Christopher Meredith contributed an article about Rhapsody to Planet magazine no. 107 in 1994, and a longer essay on Edwards's fiction, "Rhapsody's lost story", focusing on the then unpublished "La Penseuse" in Moment of Earth (Celtic Studies Publications, 2007). He went on to edit and introduce the standard Parthian Library of Wales edition of 2007 of Rhapsody, to which he added the two late stories as well as "La Penseuse". Winter Sonata appeared again in Honno Welsh Women's Classics in 2011, with an introduction by Claire Flay. Flay's Dorothy Edwards (UWP, 2011) is the first book-length study. Interest in her life and work has continued to grow.

In 2023, Gary Raymond's play about Edwards, A Beautiful Rhythm of Life and Death directed by Chris Durnall, a produced by a Company of Sirens was staged at the Chapter Arts Centre, Cardiff.

Some manuscripts came to light in the Garnett family archive at Northwestern University in Evanston, Il, which allowed Blackthorn Press to include three previously unpublished stories in their Complete Short Stories by Dorothy Edwards (2025).

== Works ==
- Rhapsody (short stories), London: Wishart, 1927; London: Virago 1986; Cardigan: Parthian, 2007, Pickering, Blackthorn Press, 2021, ISBN 979-8-7117-8158-5
- Winter Sonata (novel), London: Wishart, 1928; London: Virago 1986; Aberystwyth: Honno, 2011. Pickering: Blackthorn Press, 2021, ISBN 979-8-7118-0972-2
- Complete Short Stories by Dorothy Edwards, Blackthorn Press, 2025, ISBN 9781906259716

== Papers ==
The University of Reading acquired Edwards' letters and papers in the 1990s. The Garnett family archive housed at the Charles Deering McCormick Library (Special Collections and Archives) at Northwestern University hold several of her manuscripts and notebooks.
