= June Purvis =

Professor of women's and gender history

- Known for: Scholarship on Emmeline Pankhurst and the suffrage movement

Academic background
- Education: Open University

Academic work
- Institutions: University of Portsmouth
- Notable works: Emmeline Pankhurst: A Biography

June Purvis is a British historian and emeritus professor of women's and gender history at the University of Portsmouth. She is known for her scholarship on the British women’s suffrage movement, feminist historiography, and the life and activism of Emmeline Pankhurst.

== Early life and education ==
Purvis studied sociology and history before undertaking postgraduate research focusing on women’s education and the social construction of gender roles. Her early academic work examined the experiences of girls and women within the British education system, a theme that later shaped her contributions to women’s history.

== Career ==
Purvis spent the majority of her academic career at the University of Portsmouth, where she helped establish and expand women's and gender history as a field of research and teaching. She supervised postgraduate students and contributed to curriculum development in women’s studies and feminist history.

From 2014 to 2018, Purvis served as Chair of the Women’s History Network UK, and from 2015 to 2020 she acted as Treasurer of the International Federation for Research in Women’s History. She organised the Women’s History Network Annual Conference, held at the University of Portsmouth on 31 August–1 September 2018, titled Campaigns for Women’s Suffrage: National and International Perspectives.

Purvis is also the editor of Women's History Review, an academic journal that publishes research on women’s and gender history.

== Research ==
Purvis’s research focuses on women’s and gender history in Britain between the nineteenth and early twentieth centuries. She has written extensively on the Women’s Social and Political Union (WSPU) and has contributed to debates on feminist biography, gendered political activism, and the historiography of the suffrage movement.

She is particularly known for her revisionist biography of Emmeline Pankhurst, which challenges traditional portrayals of militant suffrage activism and has been widely cited within suffrage studies. Purvis’s work also includes analyses of women’s education, feminist pedagogy, and the social expectations placed on girls in the Victorian and Edwardian eras.

Her research interests include:

- political culture of the British women’s suffrage movement
- feminist historiographical debates
- biographical methods in gender history
- women's and girls' education in Britain
- militant and non-militant suffrage strategies

Purvis has contributed to numerous academic journals, edited collections, conferences, and public history initiatives related to women's rights and feminist history outreach.

== Selected publications ==
- Purvis, June (2008) Women's History: Britain, 1850–1945: An Introduction. Routledge, London and New York. ISBN 978-1-135-36710-7.
- Purvis, June (2002) Emmeline Pankhurst: A Biography. Routledge, London and New York. ISBN 0-415-23978-8 (hardback). ISBN 978-0-415-32593-6 (paperback).
- Purvis, June and Maroula, Joannou (1998) The Women’s Suffrage Movement: New Feminist Perspectives. Manchester University Press.
- Purvis, June (1991) A History of Women’s Education in England. Open University Press, Milton Keynes and Philadelphia. ISBN 0-335-09775-8. (Translated into Japanese, Minerva Press, 1997.)
- Purvis, June (1989) Hard Lessons: The Lives and Education of Working-Class Women in Nineteenth-Century England. Polity Press, Cambridge. ISBN 0-7456-0663-6.
