= Endsleigh Street =

Street in Bloomsbury, London

Coordinates: 51°31′31.51″N 0°7′48.66″W

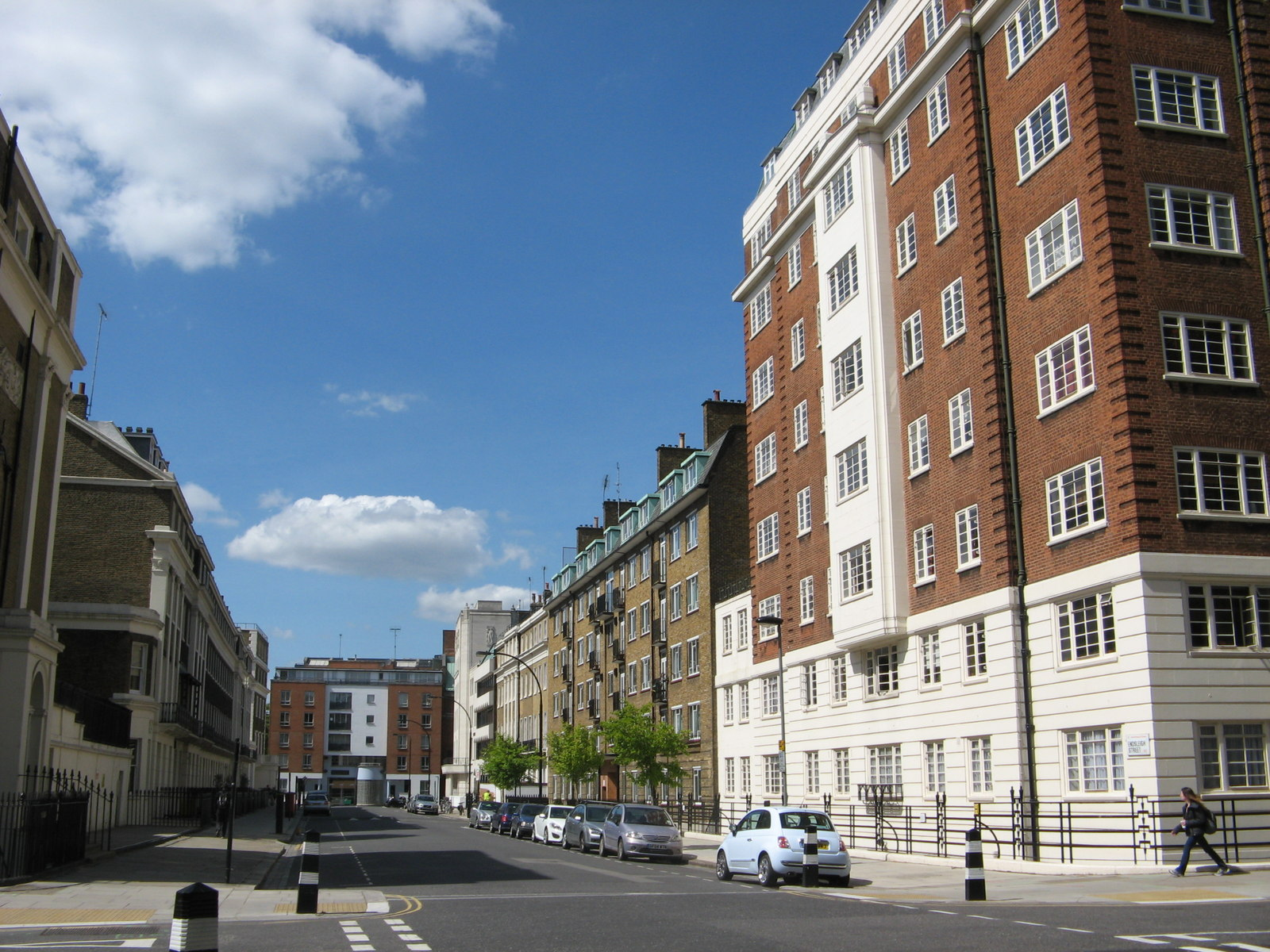
Endsleigh Street looking north

Endsleigh Street is in the Bloomsbury district of central London, in the London Borough of Camden, England. It connects Endsleigh Gardens to the north to Endsleigh Place and Tavistock Square to the south.

== Former residents ==
According to the Survey of London, former Endsleigh Street include:

- No. 1. 1848–1855, Sir William Atherton (1806–1864), lawyer. Solicitor-General, 1859 and Attorney-General, 1861. Liberal M.P. for Durham.
- No. 10. 1839–1853, Sir Charles John Crompton (1797–1865), barrister, Inner Temple, 1821. Justice of the Queen's Bench, 1852.
- No. 11. 1864–1876, Rev. T. V. Povah.
- No. 21. 1841–1862, Sir John Mellor (1809–1887), barrister of the Inner Temple and judge. M.P. for Great Yarmouth and Nottingham.
- No. 21. 1891–1902, Rev. John Wogan Festing, vicar of Christ Church, Albany Street, 1878–1890; rural dean of St. Pancras, 1887, and prebendary of St. Pauls, 1888. Bishop of St. Albans, 1890. Died unmarried in Endsleigh Street.

The street became home to a number of artists and writers in the first part of the twentieth century, including David Garnett, with whose family novelist Dorothy Edwards lodged.
