= Mawddwy =

Community in Gwynedd, Wales

- Location within Gwynedd
- Area: 119.8 km^{2} (46.3 sq mi)
- Population: 622
  - Density: 5/km^{2} (13/sq mi)
- OS grid reference: SH 8577 1473
  - Cardiff: 88.3 mi (142.1 km)
  - London: 172.8 mi (278.1 km)
- Community: Mawddwy
- Principal area: Gwynedd
- Country: Wales
- Sovereign state: United Kingdom
- Post town: Machynlleth
- Police: North Wales
- Fire: North Wales
- Ambulance: Welsh
- List of places UK Wales Gwynedd 52.718139°N 3.692595°W Map of the community

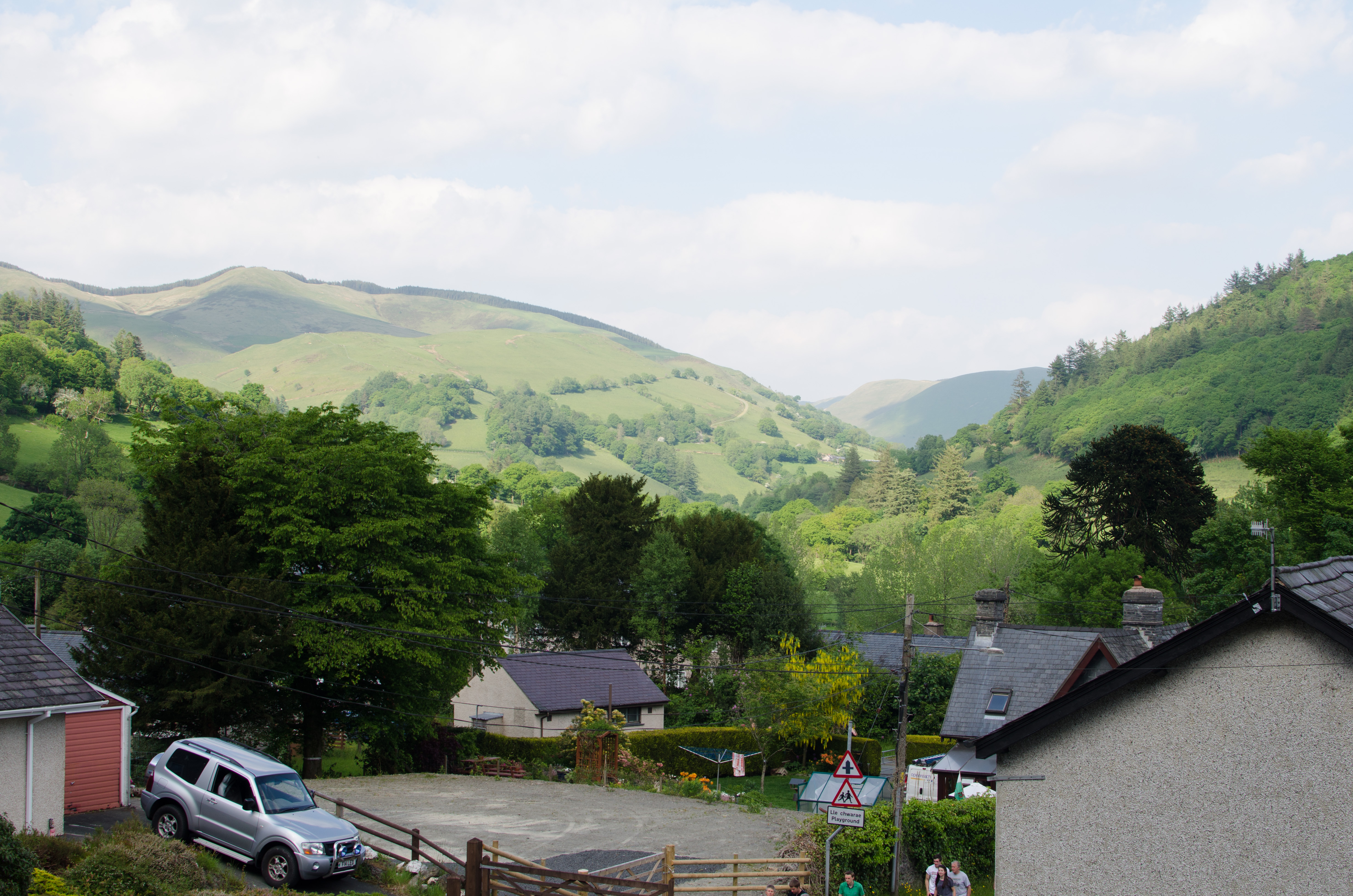
A view across Dinas Mawddwy

Mawddwy is a community in the county of Gwynedd, Wales, and is 88.3 miles (142.2 km) from Cardiff and 172.8 miles (278.0 km) from London. In 2011 the population of Mawddwy was 622 with 59.5% of them able to speak Welsh. It is one of the largest and most sparsely populated communities in Wales.

== History ==
Mawddwy was a medieval commote in the cantref of Cynan of the Kingdom of Powys. Cynan also contained the commote of Cyfeiliog. Other sources refer to Cyfeiliog as a cantref in its own right, possibly as a result of Cynan being renamed for the largest commote within it. The town of Dinas Mawddwy and villages of Mallwyd, Aberangell, and Llanymawddwy are within the community of Mawddwy. It is a very hilly region stretching across the pass of Bwlch y Groes, from Llyn Tegid to Cadair Idris. The rocks date back to the Cambrian Period and slate, silver and lead have been mined here.

In the late 1230s the Commute of Mawddwy was held by Gruffydd ap Llywelyn, illegitimate son of Llywelyn Fawr.

In the cantref of Cynan, lies the village of Mallwyd, "delightfully situated between the salient angles of three abrupt mountains", near the old boundary between the counties of Merionethshire and Montgomeryshire. Dr. John Davies lived here in the mid-seventeenth century; he was involved with Bishop Parry of St Asaph in the translation of the bible into the Welsh language.

This was the region of the Red Bandits of Mawddwy. These were a band of red-haired robbers, highwaymen or footpads from the area of Mawddwy in Mid Wales in the 16th century, who became famous in folk literature. They are said to have committed arson, robbery and murder, stealing great herds of cattle and driving them off into the hills. They ambushed and murdered the Sheriff of Meirionnydd, Baron Lewis ap Owen on 12 October 1555, but were later apprehended and executed.

== See also ==
- Mawddwy Railway
- Red Bandits of Mawddwy
- List of localities in Wales by population
