= Tydecho =

6th-century Welsh saint

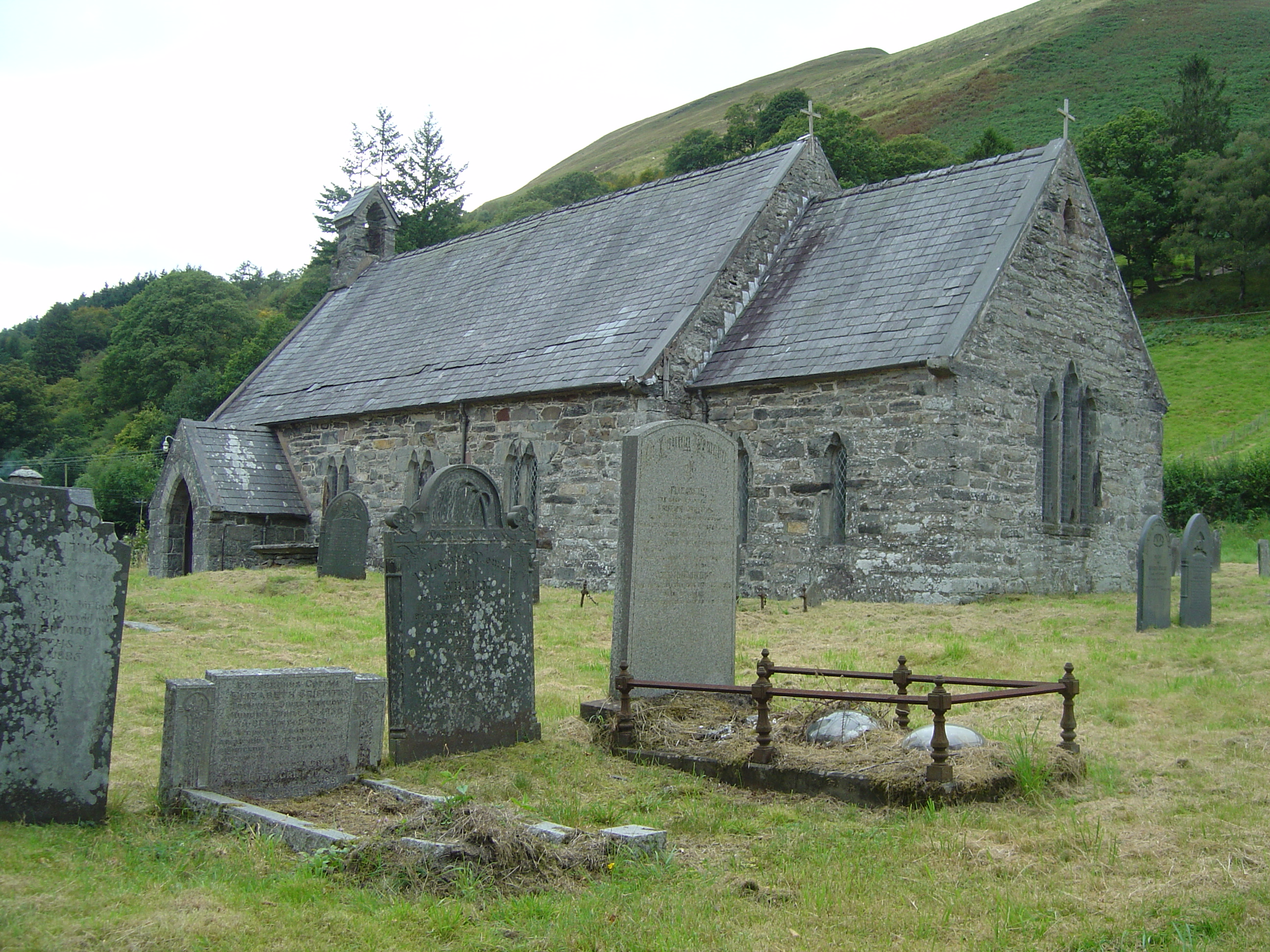
St Tydecho Church, Llanymawddwy

Saint Tydecho was a 6th century saint of Wales.

The life of Saint Padarn described Tydecho as one of the saints who came to Wales from Armorica. There are questions as to whether this place was Brittany or an area in southeast Wales which is known for its saints. Tydecho was the son of Amwn Ddu (himself son of Emyr Llydaw) and a cousin of Saint Cadfan, with whom he travelled Wales.

He is said to have come to Wales during the time of King Arthur and became an anchorite after the great king's death. Tydecho lived with his sister Tegfedd in the Mawddwy area and was the founder of churches at Llanymawddwy, Mallwyd, Garthbeibio and Cemmaes. Tydecho is also credited with founding a chapel, Capel Tydecho, in Llandegfan.

Tydecho acquired some of the land for his churches by interesting means. His sister Tegfedd was a beautiful woman who attracted the attention of a wealthy man named Cynon, who kidnapped her as he was so taken by her beauty. Tydecho caught up with the man and forced him to release his sister. He was also able to convince Cynon to compensate for his misdeed by ceding some land to Tydecho for a church at Garthbeibio. (Note: Tydecho had previously established a church at Llanymawddwy. Some people would cross over the mountains to get to church and were not successful in making their crossing. Three women died on the mountain of exposure while trying to get to the Llanymawddwy church. The church built on this land at Garthbeibio made the dangerous journey unnecessary.)

Legends record the young prince of Gwynedd, Maelgwn Gwynedd, as a chief tormentor of the saint. Tydecho, who slept on rocks, wore a hair shirt and engaged in agriculture, used oxen to plough his fields. The prince decided to make off with Tydecho's team. A visit to Tydecho's land the next day found him using a pair of wild stags to plough with a grey wolf pulling the harrow behind them. The angry prince brought dogs to chase off the deer and sat down on a rock to watch the spectacle. When he tried to rise, Gwynedd was unable to do so. His only choice was to make apologies to the saint and beg forgiveness. Among the known concessions were: Tydecho's land was a sanctuary for both men and beasts and exempt from mortuaries, claims and any oppression.

Another legend says that a milkmaid working for Tydecho slipped when crossing the river and her pail of milk spilled into the water. Tydecho's response to the accident was to turn the river from its source to the village of Llanymawddwy into a stream of milk; he called this section Llaethnant. The Welsh poets Dafydd Llwyd ap Llywelyn ap Gruffudd and Matthew Brwmffild have both written poems about St. Tydecho: "The Legend of St Tydecho" and "St. Tydecho, and the Two Parishes of Mawddwy".

A feast day is celebrated on 17 December. (Note: Another source gives it as Easter Monday.)
