= Mallwyd =

Village in Gwynedd, Wales

Coordinates: 52.698°N 3.684°W

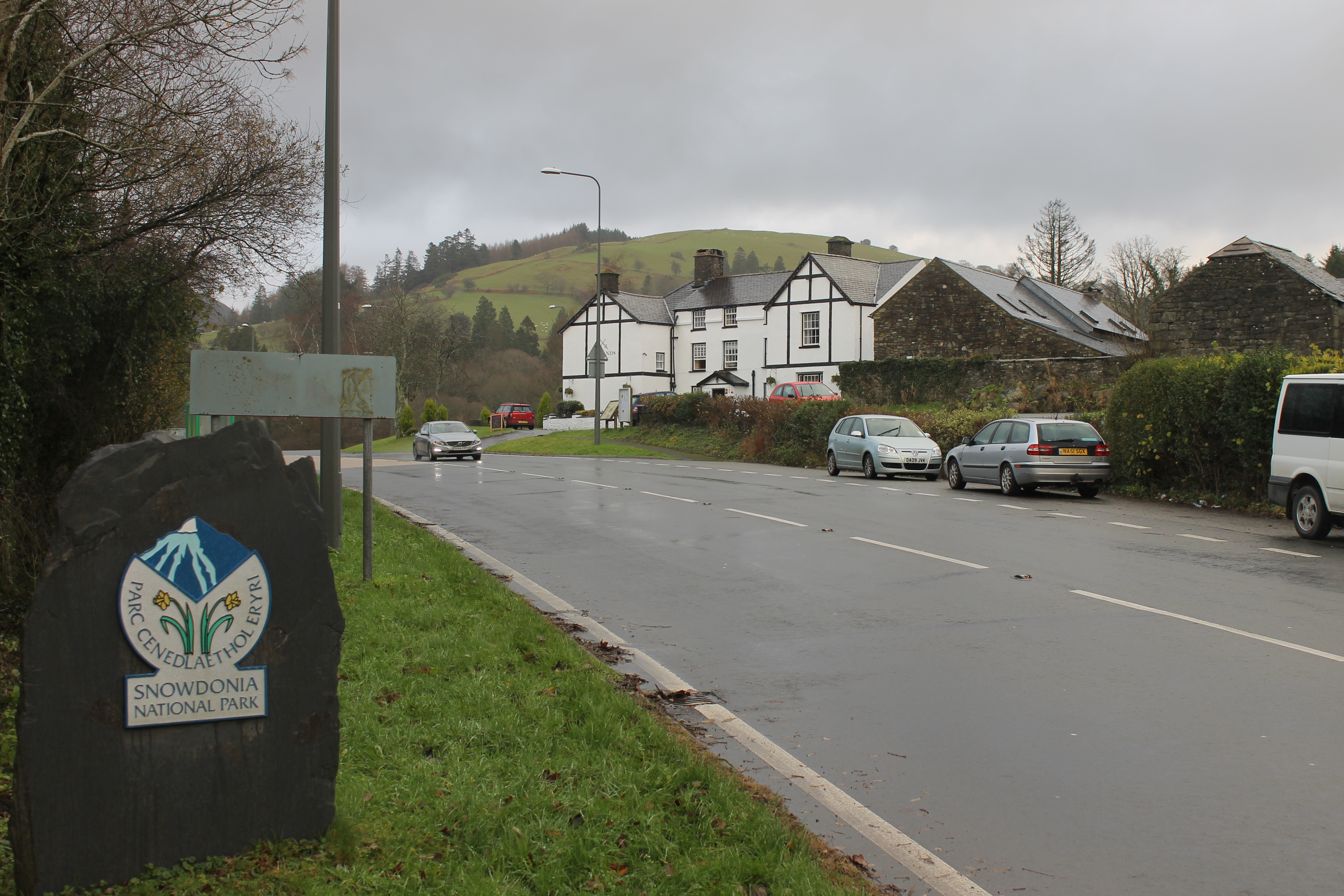
- Mallwyd village

- Location within Gwynedd
- OS grid reference: SH862125
- Community: Mawddwy
- Principal area: Gwynedd
- Country: Wales
- Sovereign state: United Kingdom
- Post town: MACHYNLLETH
- Postcode district: SY20
- Dialling code: 01650
- Police: North Wales
- Fire: North Wales
- Ambulance: Welsh
- UK Parliament: Dwyfor Meirionnydd
- Senedd Cymru – Welsh Parliament: Dwyfor Meirionnydd

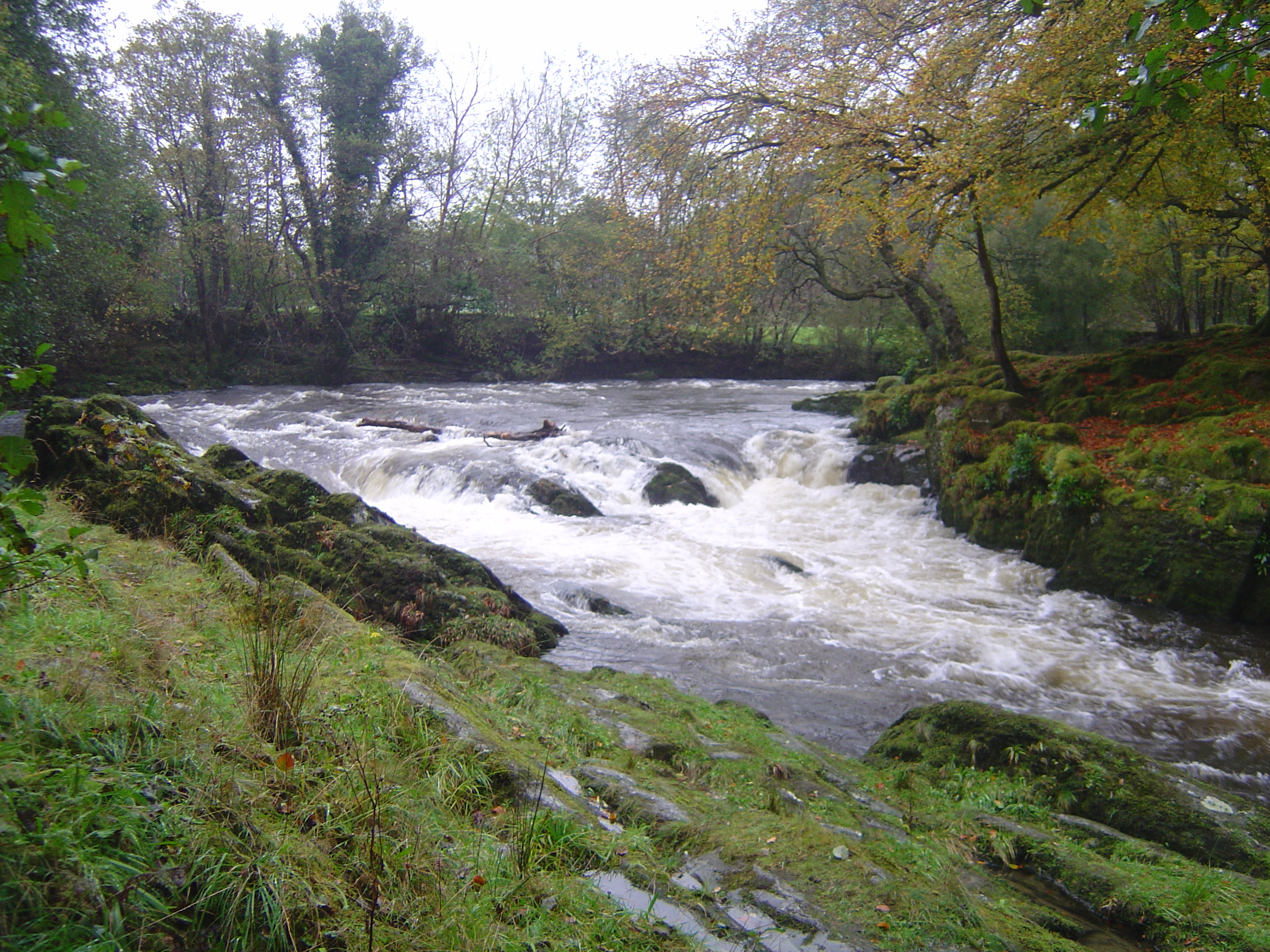
Waterfalls near Mallwyd, 28 October 2006.

Mallwyd (Welsh pronunciation) is a small village at the most southern end of Gwynedd, Wales, in the Mawddwy community, in the valley of the River Dyfi. It lies on the A470 approximately halfway between Dolgellau and Machynlleth, and forms the junction of the A458 towards Welshpool. The nearest villages are Dinas Mawddwy, two miles to the north, and Aberangell a similar distance to the south. The River Dugoed flows into the River Dyfi near the village. The Cambrian Way long-distance walk passes through the village.

== History ==
The village is near the boundary between the historic counties of Merioneth and Montgomeryshire, in the parish of Mallwyd in the district of Mawddwy. This was the region of the Red Bandits of Mawddwy, which is remembered in name of the village pub, The Brigands.

=== Administrative history ===
Mallwyd was an ancient parish, which straddled the historic counties of Merioneth and Montgomeryshire. Under the Local Government Act 1894 parishes were no longer allowed to straddle county boundaries, and so the parts of the parish in Montgomeryshire became a separate parish called Caereinion Fechan, which later became part of Glantwymyn, leaving a smaller Mallwyd parish entirely in Merioneth.

The parish of Mallwyd (which included Dinas Mawddwy) was made an urban district in 1895. The Mallwyd Urban District Council included Edward Hurst Davies in 1899 and 1900. It had an unusually small population for an urban district, with just 679 people in 1931. It was downgraded to a rural parish within Dolgellau Rural District in 1934. Rural parishes were converted into communities in 1974. Mallwyd community was subsequently abolished in 1985, merging with the neighbouring community of Llanymawddwy to become the new community of Mawddwy.

=== Railway ===
In 1867, the Mawddwy Railway was opened, connecting Dinas Mawddwy with Cemmaes Road. A small station was provided to serve Mallwyd, though it was nearly a mile from the village. Passenger services on the railway were withdrawn in 1931, and the railway closed and was lifted in 1952.

== St Tydecho's Church ==
According to tradition, Mallwyd church was founded in the 6th century by Saint Tydecho after he came to the area from Cornwall. The present building dates from the 14th century and is unusual in form, being long and narrow with a balcony at each end. There are many wooden fixtures dating from the 17th century. The scholar John Davies was rector of Mallwyd for 40 years at the beginning of the 17th century. There is a memorial to him in the church which was put up to commemorate the 200th anniversary of his death. Outside the church are several great yew trees.

The timber bell tower of the church is inscribed: SOLI DEO SACRUM ANNI CHRISTI MDCXL. It formerly also read VENITE CANTEM[us domino] A.D.1640 HONOR DEO IN EXCELSIS. The portals of the church, found between the church and the river, are decorated with fossil mammal bones. The black marble, octagonal font, dated below the bowl 1734, was a gift of Sir John Mytton of Dinas Mawddwy.

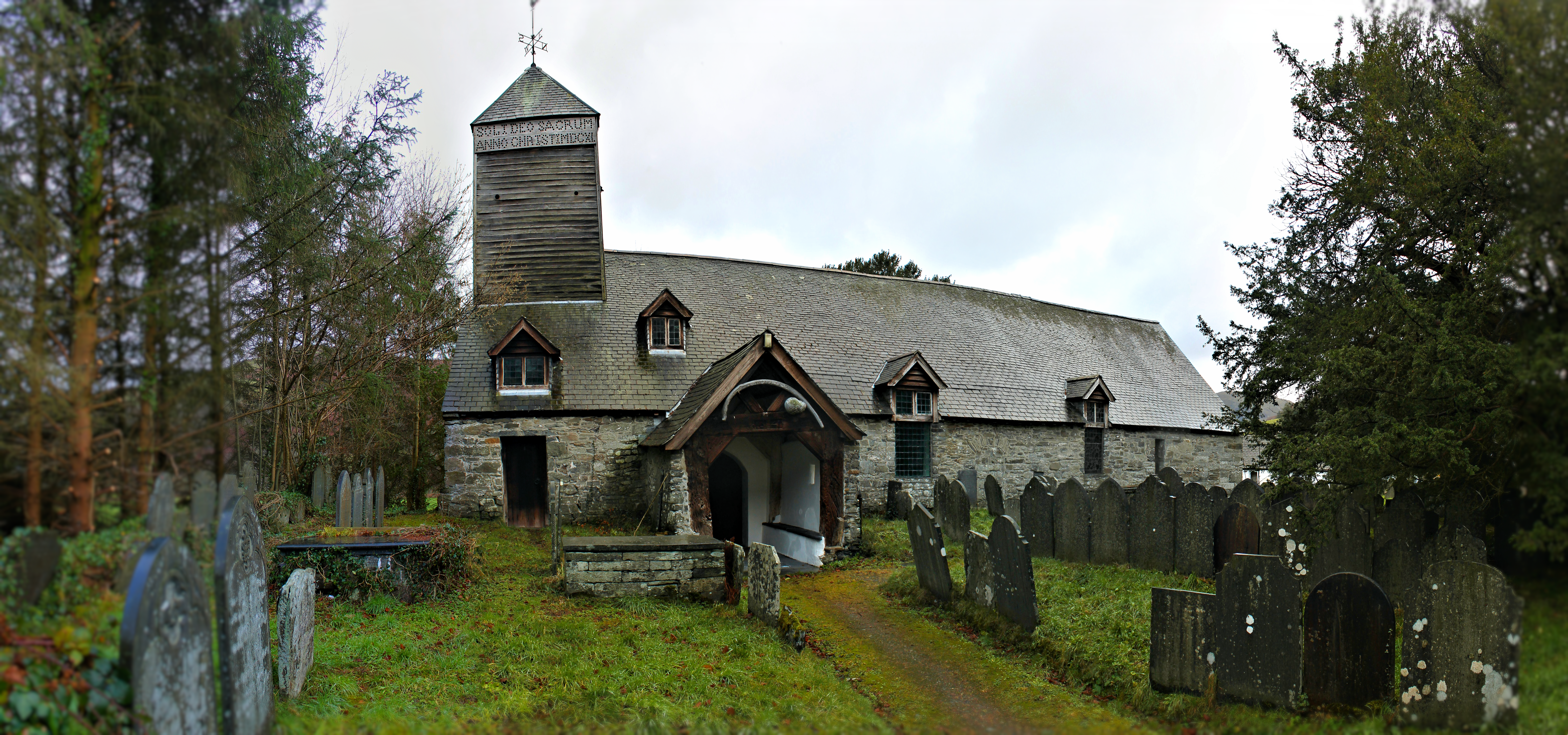
The church viewed from the East

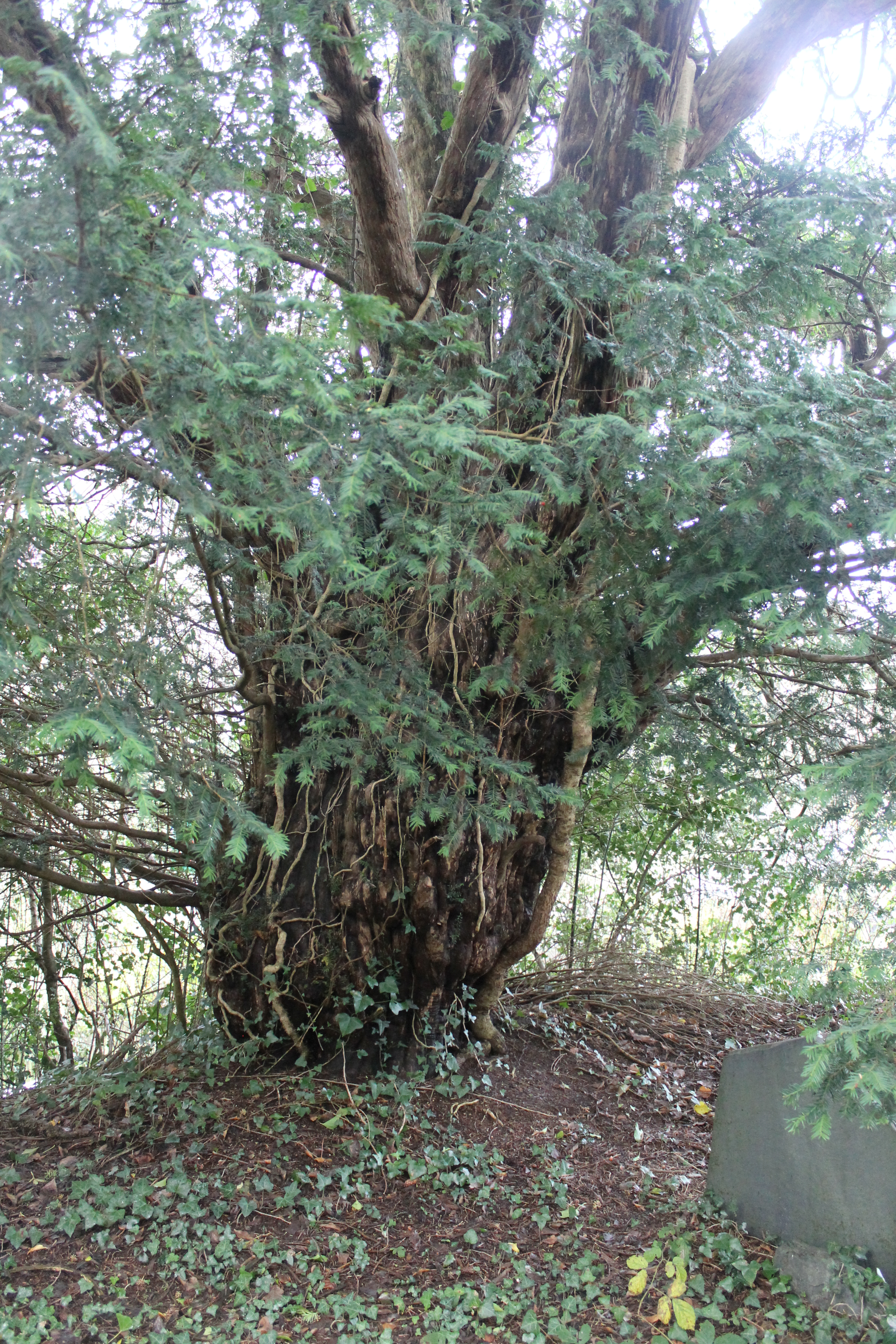
Yew tree

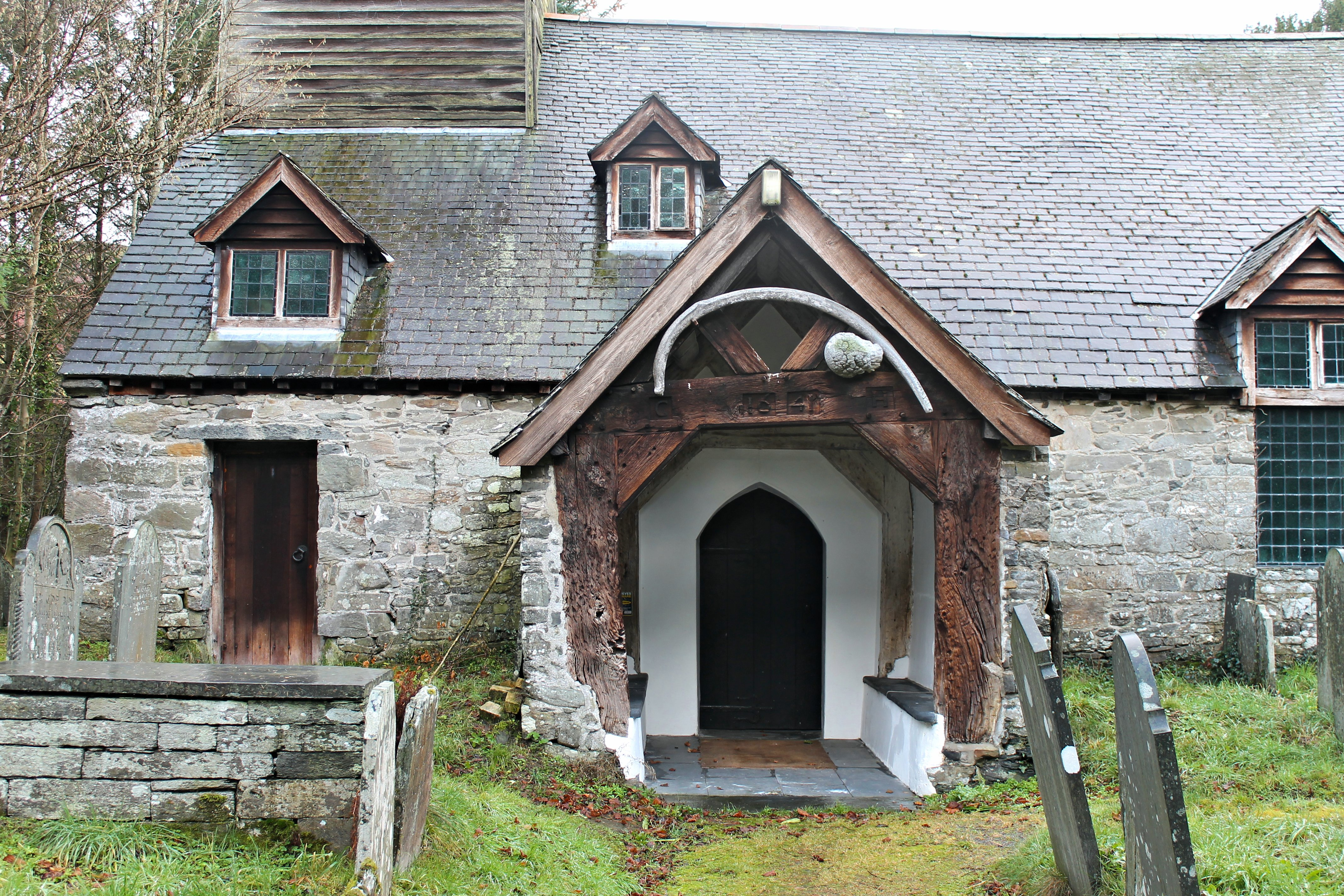
Church portals

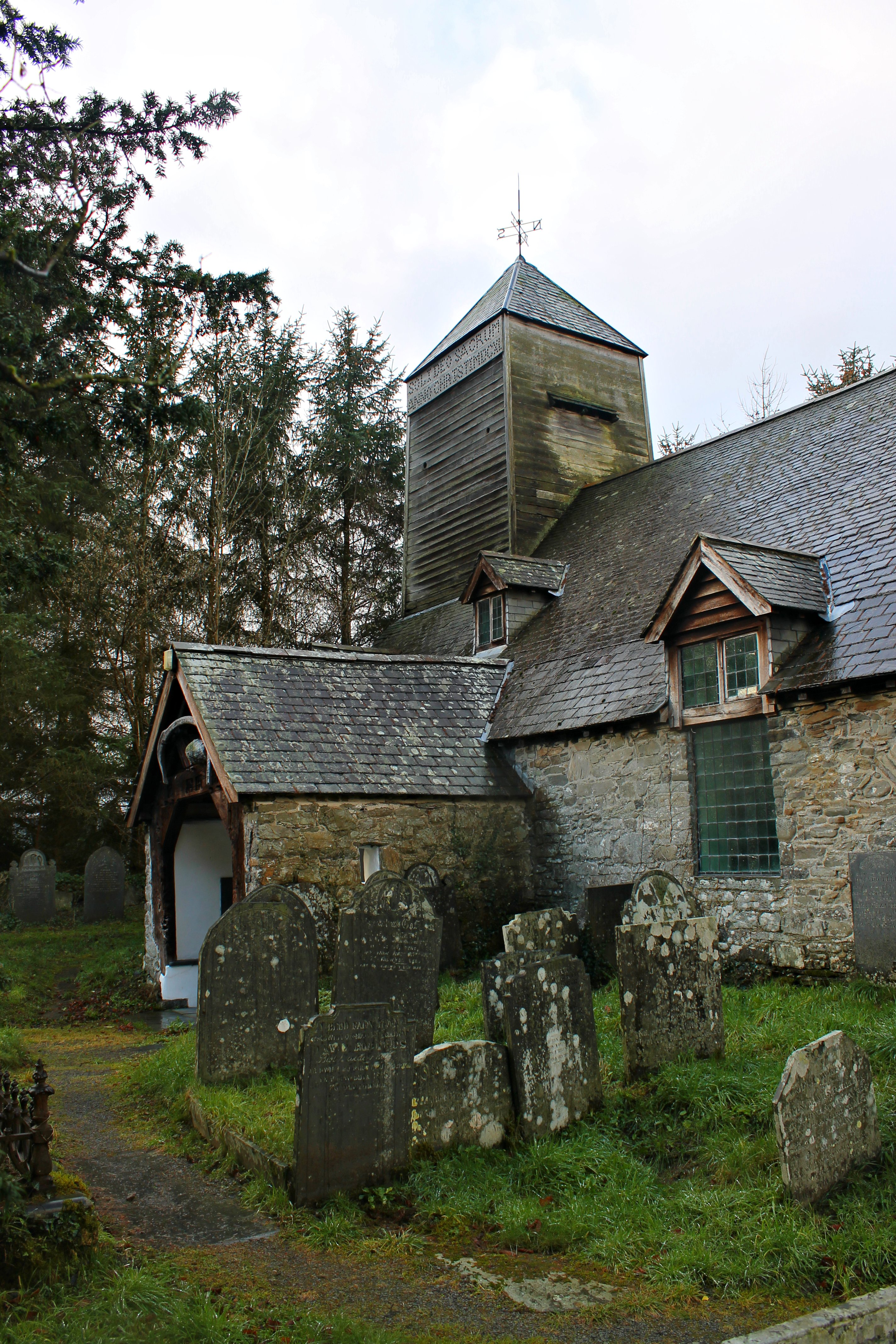
Ports and timber belltower

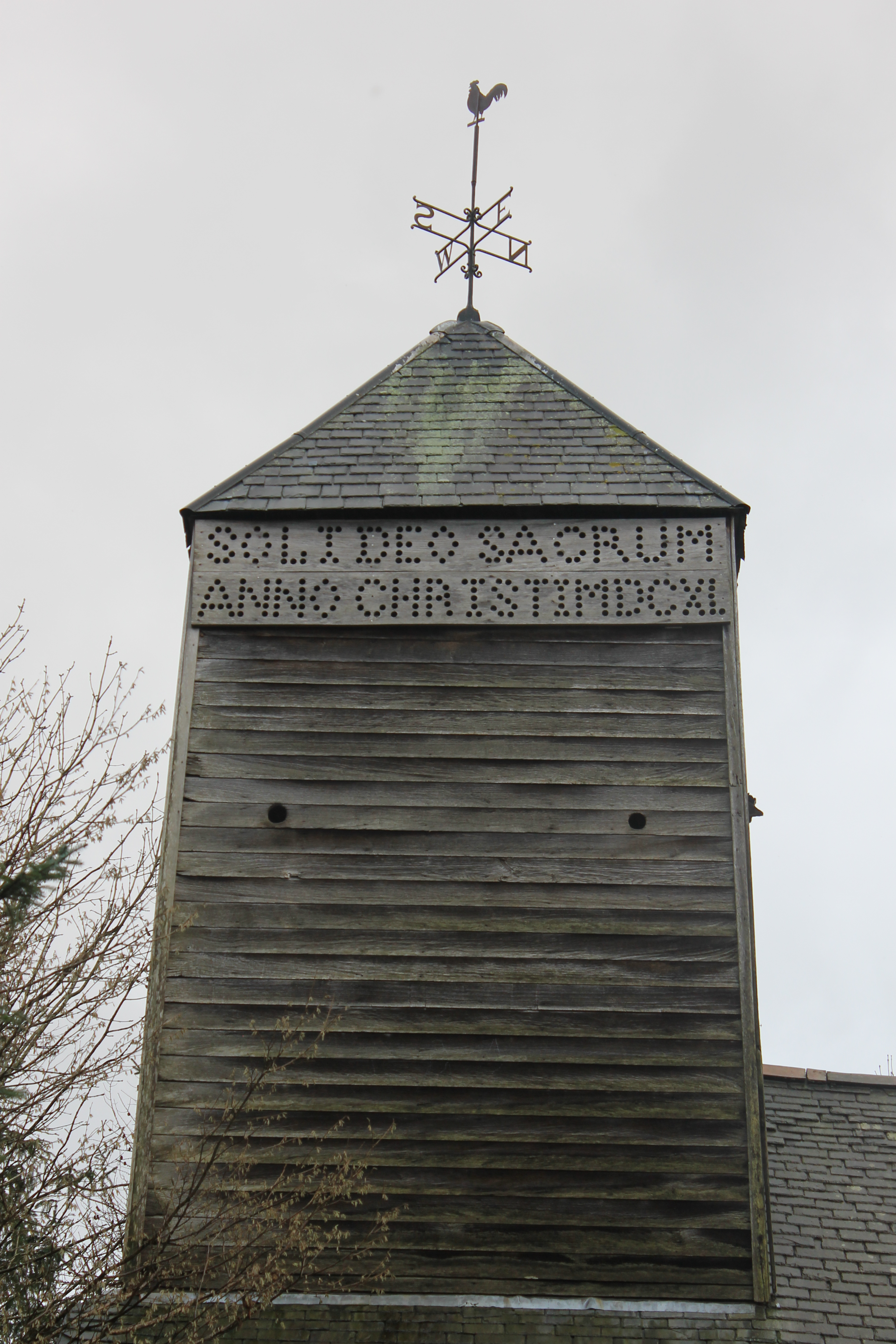
The timber belltower

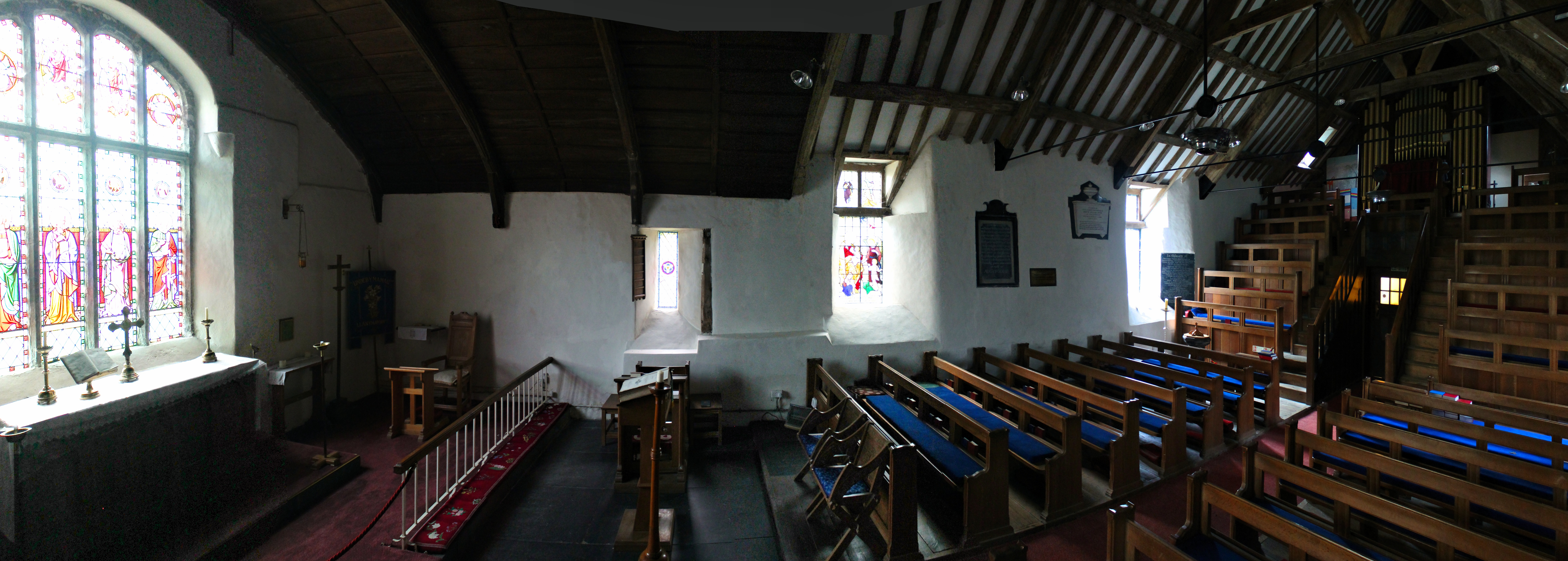
A panoramic view of the church facing East

Raised seating at the back of the church

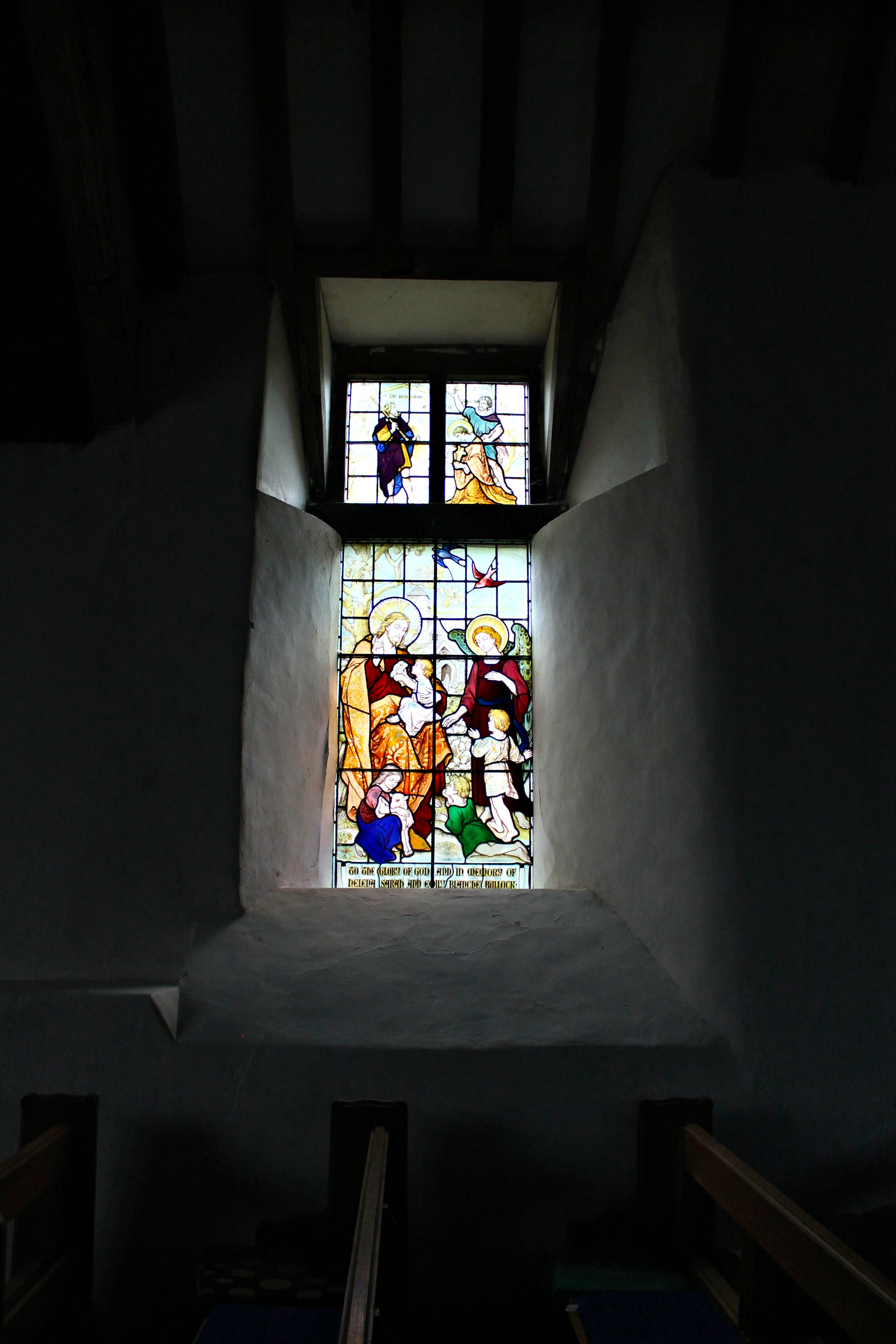

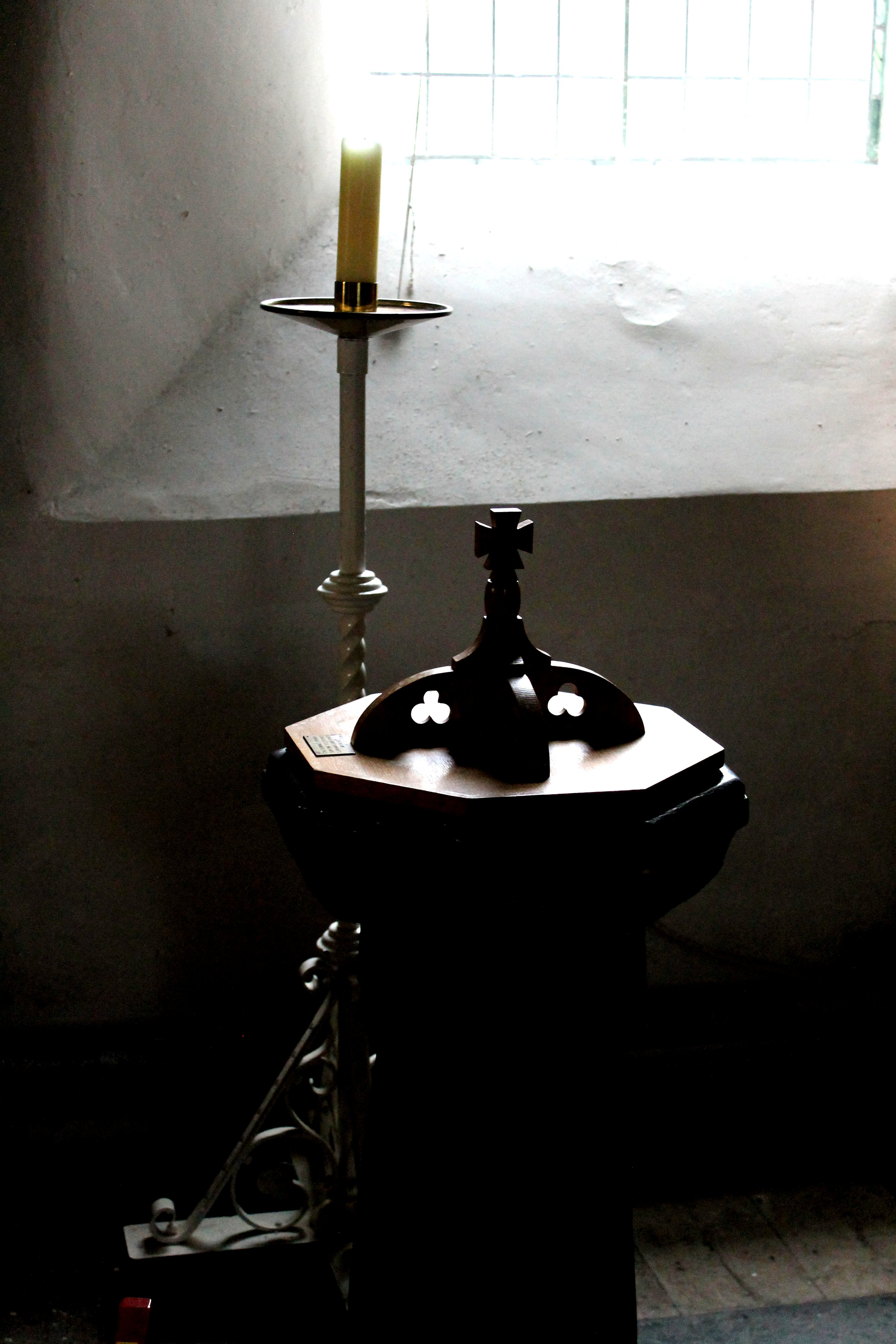
The font

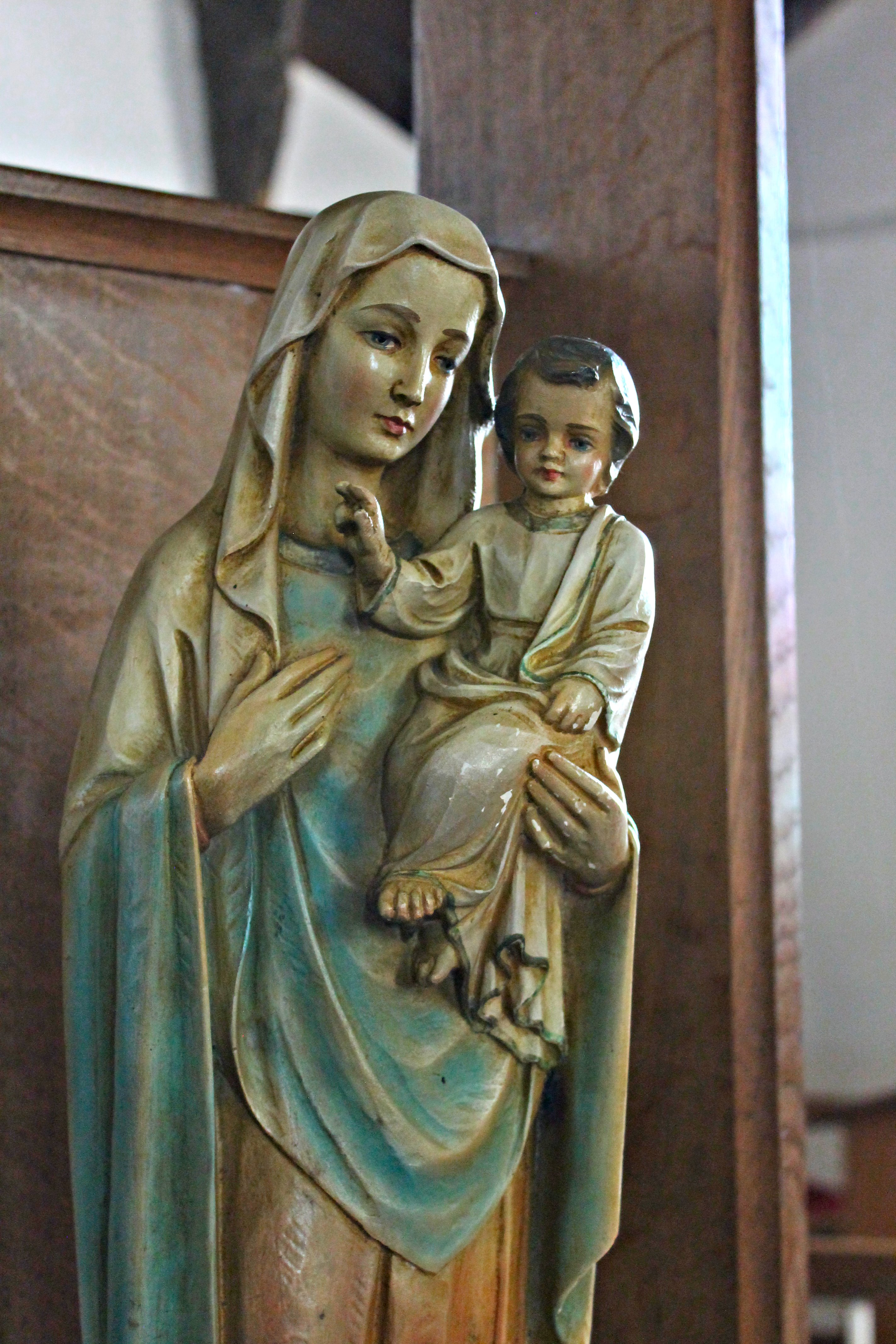
Sculpture of the Virgin and Child

== Notable people ==
- John Davies (ca.1567–1644), scholar, Rector of Mallwyd 1604–44
- Robert Foulkes (ca.1633 Mallwyd–1679), clergyman and murderer.
- John Rice Jones (1759 Mallwyd–1824), American jurist and politician
- Rowland Williams (177 Mallwyd–1854), Welsh Anglican priest and writer
- Robert Vaughn (1836–1918), Montana Rancher
