= Wales Way =

Three tourism routes in Wales

The Wales Way (Welsh: Ffordd Cymru) is the name collectively given to a series of three tourist routes in Wales, UK, promoted by Visit Wales, the government agency charged with promoting tourism in the country. The three routes are the 180-mile Coastal Way, the 75-mile North Wales Way and the 185-mile Cambrian Way. The Wales Way was launched in late 2018.

The Cambrian Way (Welsh: Ffordd Cambria) extends from Cardiff on the Bristol Channel north through the heart of the country to Llandudno on the North Wales coast. Highlights include the towns of Brecon, Builth Wells, Rhayader, Dolgellau, Blaenau Ffestiniog, Betws-y-coed and Conwy. It passes through both the Brecon Beacons and Snowdonia national parks. This Cambrian Way should not be confused with the long-distance walkers' route, the Cambrian Way which runs from Cardiff to Conwy.

The Coastal Way (Welsh: Ffordd Arforidol or sometimes Ffordd yr Arfordir) runs from Aberdaron near the western tip of the Llŷn Peninsula around the edge of Cardigan Bay to St Davids in northwest Pembrokeshire, and running through two national parks, Snowdonia and the Pembrokeshire Coast. Highlights include Portmeirion, Criccieth, Barmouth, Aberaeron, New Quay, Newport and St Davids.

The North Wales Way (Welsh: Ffordd Gogledd Cymru or sometimes Ffordd y Gogledd) runs from Mold in northeast Wales to Anglesey, its western terminus being the Irish Sea port of Holyhead. Highlights include the Clwydian Range and Dee Valley AONB (with the Clwydian Range hills) and the resort towns of Colwyn Bay and Llandudno and the historic towns of Ruthin and Conwy where it enters Snowdonia.

== See also ==
- North Coast 500
- Wild Atlantic Way
