= Caereinion Fechan =

Former community in Powys

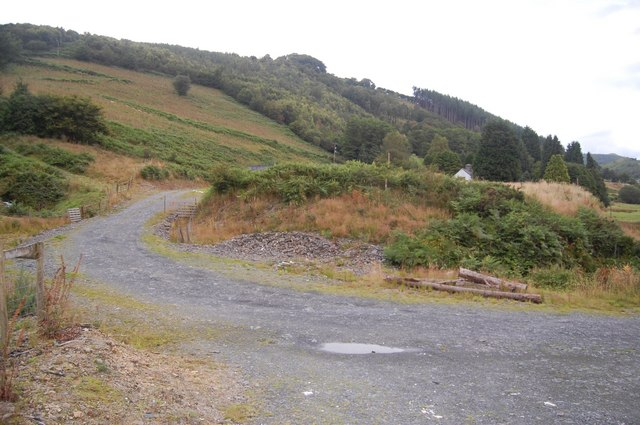
Track towards Llechwedd-gwyn farm

Caereinion Fechan was a community in Powys, Wales, and the historic county of Montgomeryshire.

Originally it was a township in the parish of Mallwyd, comprising a small area of Montgomeryshire next to the border with Merionethshire, to the south-west of Aberangell. Much of the area was in the Dyfi Forest.

It was established as a civil parish in 1894 from the part of Mallwyd parish which was in Montgomeryshire. It was included in Machynlleth Rural District. In 1974 it became a community and on 1 April 1987 it was abolished. It is now part of the community of Glantwymyn.

== Population ==
- 1891: 121
- 1901: 123
- 1911: 92
- 1921: 89
- 1931: 105
- 1951: 64
- 1961: 42
- 1971: 43
