= Chamberlain of North Wales =

The Chamberlain of North Wales was a financial official of the Principality of Wales during the medieval period. The Chamberlain controlled the provincial Exchequer located at Caernarfon.

== Background ==
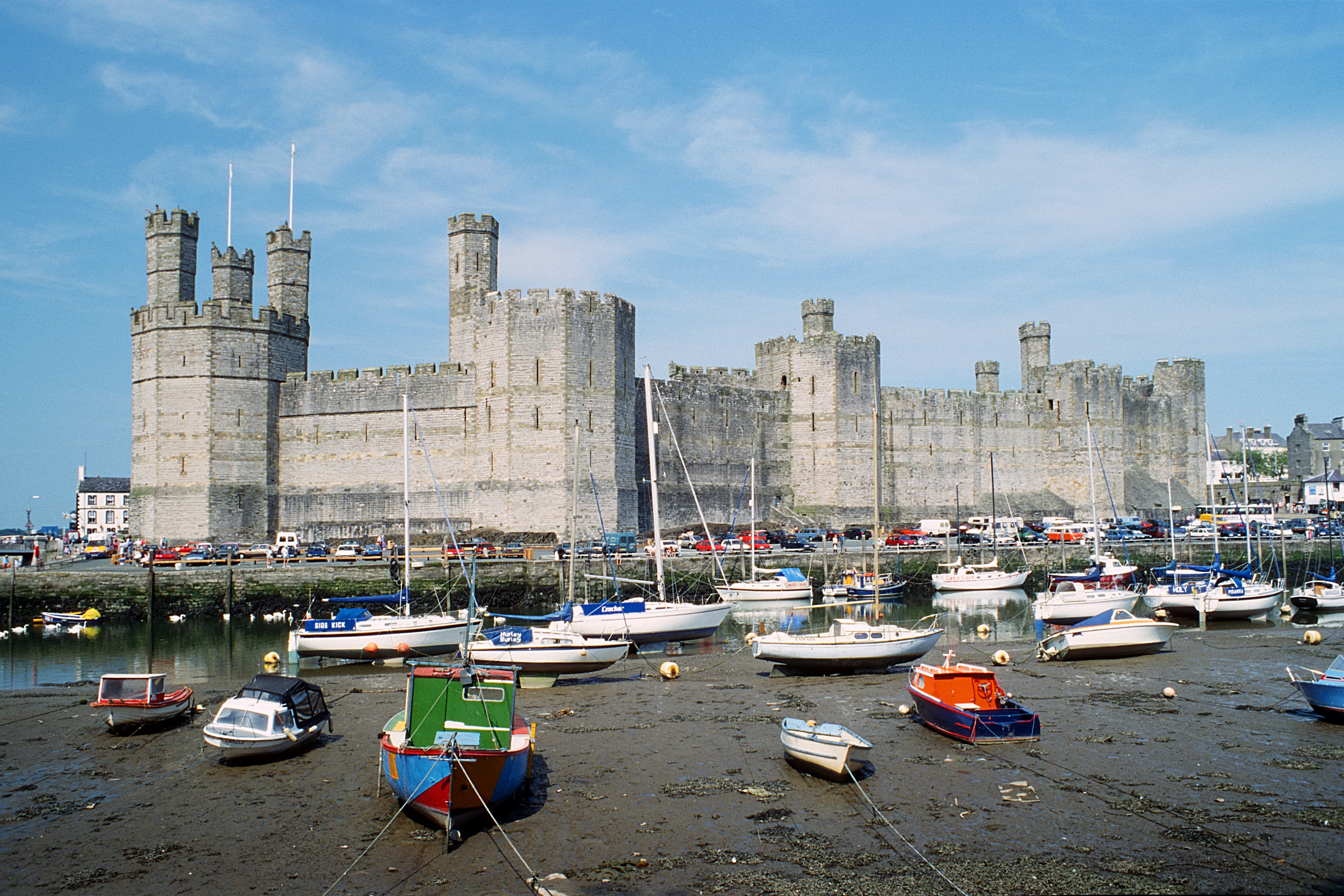
Caernarfon Castle, seat of the Exchequer and Chamberlain of North Wales

With the final defeat of the Welsh Princes of Gwynedd in 1282, Edward I of England "annexed and united" North Wales to the English crown although it did not become part of the Kingdom of England but was the king's personal fief. The governance and constitutional position of the principality after its conquest was set out in the Statute of Rhuddlan of 1284. The new administration comprised a number of royal officials appointed at the King's pleasure, including the Chamberlain of North Wales.

== Responsibilities ==
Based at Caernarfon, the Chamberlain managed the Principality of Wales's finances for the North Wales counties under the control of the Justiciar of North Wales. The counties within his remit were Anglesey, Merionethshire, and Caernarfonshire and he accounted for the revenues of the provincial exchequer at Caernarfon to the Exchequer at Westminster. They also kept the Great Seal of North Wales, and when leases of land were needed to be sealed or the seal applied to documents authorizing payments, the Chamberlain's advice was sought. The Chamberlains used their office to enrich themselves: for example, Tomas Barneby, Chamberlain from 1406 to 1414 was dismissed by Henry V for embezzlement and extortion.

== Notable Chamberlains ==
- Thomas Walton
- Henry Norris (courtier)
- Richard de Abyndon
- Robert le Poer
- Lewis ap Owen
