= Tony Drake (hiker) =

British hiker

- Born: 25 January 1923; Gloucestershire, England
- Died: 7 March 2012 (aged 89); Gloucestershire, England
- Occupations: Draper, Mountaineer, Walker, Writer, Cartographer
- Writing career
- Genre: Mountain Topography
- Notable work: Cambrian Way Guidebook
- Movements: Geographical and Scenic

Tony Drake (Antony John Drake MBE (25 January 1923 – 7 March 2012) was an English Rambler perhaps best known for his pioneering work on the Cambrian Way, a mountain walk through Wales from Cardiff to Conwy. He was closely involved with surveying a suitable route and in promoting the route amidst considerable disagreement and opposition. The route was eventually published in his guidebook entitled Cambrian Way – The Mountain Connoisseur's Walk and it became the definitive route of the way. Much of his life was dedicated to footpaths both in his native county of Gloucestershire and also in Wales, where much of his walking and mountain climbing took place. He was first recorded as Footpath Secretary to the Gloucestershire Ramblers in 1951, at the age of 28 and he continued in the office until his retirement in 2008. He was also a major contributor to the creation of the Cotswold Way, which acquired National Trail status in 2007, and he was also an active member of the Youth Hostel Association. In 2001 he was awarded an MBE for Services to rights of way.

== Early life ==
Born on 25 January 1923, Tony was the only child of Leslie and Gladys Drake. He was educated at Pates Junior School and at Wycliffe College, Stroud. At Wycliffe he joined the Scouts and relished outdoor pursuits. The Wycliffe boys enjoyed a fair amount of freedom. At weekends they took ferry trips across the River Severn for expeditions to the then remote and industrialised Forest of Dean, with its coal mines and iron works. This was a very different forest from the green and beautiful place which is so attractive to tourists today. He was on a school expedition to the Mediterranean when World War II was declared. The party, undaunted, carried on and completed the trip.

Tony Drake left school at the age of 16 and entered the family business. Drakes was a significant department store, established in 1888 in Cheltenham by his grandfather and is still in operation today. In order to train Tony for his intended ultimate role of proprietor of Drakes, he was sent to learn the business, starting at the bottom, at the Bon Marche, now Debenhams, in Gloucester. This business training seems to have been thorough because it stood Tony in good stead in his chosen role of Gloucestershire Ramblers Association Area Footpath Secretary.

At the age of 18 he volunteered to join the Royal Air Force and trained as a radar technician. During this time he was posted to various far flung locations in Britain. He was demobilized in 1946.

== Adult life ==
From 1946 until the 1970s, he worked at Drakes Department Store, where he was known as 'Mr Antony'.

At some point, Drake took up Morris Dancing, which he asserted was for tough men doing strenuous warlike dancing, and in due course became the secretary to the group in which he played accordion.

He took walking holidays with Cooperative Holiday Association and Holiday Fellowship in England, and with Ramblers Holidays in Europe.

Though working in the family business, his real interest was the mountains, countryside and walking. He was inspired by the passing of the National Parks and Access to the Countryside Act 1949 and the subsequent Acts which opened up opportunities for walkers. This legislation led to the creation of the Definitive Map, where all rights of way were to be registered, and Drake and his teams of Ramblers' volunteers were deeply involved in survey work, and in recording the newly defined rights of way. He obtained copies of the 1:10,000 Ordnance Survey maps and organised his teams to mark up, in colour, the rights of way onto hundreds of maps, and he ensured that they were constantly kept up to date as new footpaths were registered. His maps and his files, one for each of over 200 parishes in Gloucestershire, were transferred to Gloucestershire County Council Archives, according to his wishes, just one week before he died.

Drake was not only a walker, he was also a keen mountaineer who climbed extensively in the Alps. More easily accessible, though, were the Welsh mountains, a not too distant drive from Gloucestershire. In 1955, he became a founder member of the Gloucestershire Mountaineering Club, playing a major part in the club's acquisition and conversion of a terraced house in Deiniolen, in Snowdonia, for use as a 'Club Hut', a base for mountaineering activities in that area. He became Hut Manager for several years and later became Club President. During this period, the 1970s, he was accompanied by club members on many of the surveys, from which he developed his proposals for the Cambrian Way.

== Later life ==
Drake inherited the family business from his father in the early 1970s. He had long been more interested in the countryside than the business, although he did continue to run the business for a few years. However, times were changing and old established family firms were losing ground to newer ways of retailing, so Drake decided to sell up and to live off the income from the proceeds. He was then able to devote his time to the real love of his life, the Ramblers Association (now The Ramblers). He served on the Ramblers board of trustees for 20 years and finally stood down in 2000. At General Council that year, he was made an Honorary Life Member for services to the Association.

Drake was a major contributor to the creation of the Cotswold Way – the 100-mile walk, which he visualised as a cliff top walk along the Cotswold edge, with occasional descents down the escarpment, and back up again, in order to take in the beauties of the lovely villages along the Way. He created a series of Cotswold Way maps, based on out-of-copyright Ordnance Survey maps, marking the route with stick-on dots to create masters, which he subsequently had printed, selling thousands of them. He also created the Cotswold Way Handbook and Accommodation Guide for the walk. In May 2007, the Cotswold Way was officially inaugurated as a National Trail with Drake and his fellow creator, Cyril Trenfield of Avon Area, as guests of honour at the celebratory event at Stanway House.

He was a very active member of the YHA Youth Hostel Association in Wales and when he left Gloucestershire at the weekends he could often be found with a paint brush or tools in his hand, hard at work enhancing the limited resources of the most rural hostels tucked away in mid Wales. He always had a preference for the simple hostels, where he could hark back to his early Scouting days.

== White Roads Campaign ==
Of lasting national importance was Drake's 'White Roads Campaign'. These were the class 4, 5 and 6 roads, shown white on Ordnance Survey maps as minor roads and which were often unmetalled, and hence vulnerable, at a time when government grants were being given for hedgerow removal in order to accommodate agricultural machinery of ever increasing size. Through these efforts, many of these ORPAs (Other Routes for Public Access) were preserved and are now marked on Ordnance Survey maps as green dots.

== Cambrian Way ==
Drake created the Cambrian Way, a long-distance trail, covering a distance of 280 miles (450 km) with an ascent of 74,000 feet (23,000 m) on the main route. The route goes over many of the mountain ranges between Cardiff and Conwy. Drake created a guidebook, with hand drawn maps and a detailed route description, a list of B&B accommodation, and prefaced by a history of its creation. At his instigation, there is now a website for the Cambrian Way. He took particular interest in the Youth Hostel Association hostels along the Way and he regularly updated the framed maps in those hostels. Due to strong opposition from some public bodies and landowners in earlier years, the route never achieved official recognition within Drake's lifetime, though it was and still is followed by those who are prepared for the challenge, as an unofficial trail. Though he did press to have the route accepted as a National Trail, this would have meant compromising some of the more challenging parts of the route, which could still be included with its unofficial status. However, he was mindful of the need for action to ensure its long-term future and he made some provision for this in his will.

The majority of Drake's estate was left to the organisations he had strong attachments to throughout his life such as The Ramblers and the YHA with the aim of promoting and maintaining the Cambrian Way and enhancing the facilities in some hostels. His legacy also involved the setting up of the Cambrian Way Trust (Officially registered on 1 October 2015) to continue updating and publishing the guidebook and website.
