= Lewis ab Owen =

Welsh judge and politician

- Born: before 1522
- Died: October 12, 1555 (aged at least 33)
- Occupation: politician
- Known for: Chamberlain and 1st Baron of the Exchequer for North Wales
- Notable work: put down the Red Bandits of Mawddwy
- Spouse(s): Margaret, daughter of Robert Puleston
- Children: 8 sons, 4 daughters
- Father: Owen ap Hywel ap Llywelyn

Lewis ab Owen (before 1522 – 12 October 1555), of Plas-yn-dre, Dolgellau, Merioneth, was a Welsh politician.

He was born the eldest son of Owen ap Hywel ap Llywelyn.

He is presumed to have had some legal education as he was appointed Chamberlain and 1st Baron of the Exchequer for North Wales.

He served as a J.P. for Merioneth from 1543 until his death and was appointed Sheriff of Merioneth for 1545 and 1554. He was a Member of Parliament (MP) for Merioneth 1547, March 1553, April 1554, and November 1554. He was custos rotulorum for Merioneth from 1553 to his death.

After carrying out a vicious campaign to put down the Red Bandits of Mawddwy (some 80 were executed) during his shrievalty in 1555 he was ambushed and killed on a return journey from Montgomeryshire. He had married Margaret, the daughter of Robert Puleston; they had eight sons and four daughters.
