= Red Bandits of Mawddwy =

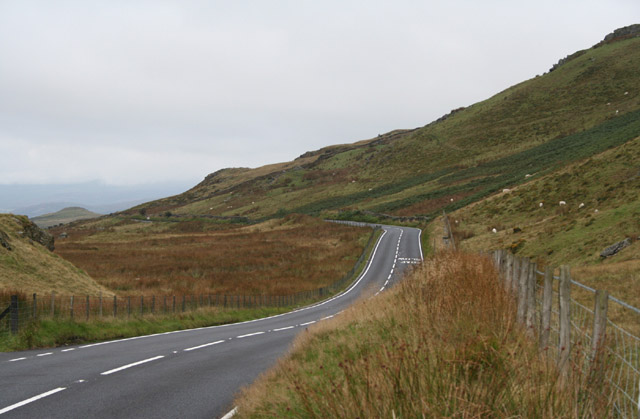
It is said the bandits used to hide near Bwlch Oerddrws to attack travellers for plunder.

The Red Bandits of Mawddwy (Welsh: Gwylliaid Cochion Mawddwy) were a band of red-haired robbers, highwaymen or footpads from the area of Mawddwy in Mid Wales in the 16th century, who became famous in folk literature.

== History ==
In the 1500s, Mawddwy was a lawless area, since it was situated on the boundary between the Welsh Marches and Meirionnydd. The only certain historical knowledge about the bandits is that they murdered the Sheriff of Meirionnydd, the Baron Lewis ap Owen, of Cwrt Plas-yn-dre, Dolgellau on 12 October 1555. The attack was carried out by a group of bandits in Dugoed Mawddwy, near Dinas Mawddwy. Several of the bandits were hanged for the murder, and there are laments for the Baron by a number of poets, including Gruffudd Hiraethog. In the subsequent court case it was alleged that John Goch, or John Goch ap Gruffudd ap Huw, was the man who struck the fatal blow.

The near-contemporary writer Robert Vaughn wrote that the bandits:

never tired of robbing, burning of houses, and murthering of people, in soe much that being very numerous, they did often drive great droves of cattell somtymes to the number of a hundred or more from one countrey to another at middle day, as in tyme of warre, without feare, shame, pittie, or punishment, to the utter undoing of the poorer sort.

— Sabine Baring-Gould, A Book of North Wales

Other information about the bandits comes from sources such as Thomas Pennant, who related the history with the chronicle of his visit to Dinas Mawddwy in about 1770. There is no certainty whether this part of the story is history or fable. According to Pennant the Sheriff had arrested a number of the bandits and was about to hang them; in their midst two sons of Lowri, daughter of Gruffudd Llwyd. One of these was very young, and Lowri implored the Baron to have mercy on the youngest, but Lewis Owen refused to listen, and hanged the two together with more than eighty other bandits. Pennant said that Lowri threatened vengeance on the sheriff: Local farmers were said to be so afraid that they fixed scythes in the wide chimneys of their houses to prevent the bandits from climbing down them - some of these improvised defences remained in place until the early 1800s.

... the mother, in a rage, told him (baring her neck) these yellow breasts have given suck to those who shall wash their hands in your blood.

— Thomas Pennant, Tours of Wales

Lowri daughter of Gruffudd Llwyd was named in the court case in Sesiwn Fawr, Bala, in 1558 following the murder, but she was described as a spinster. In an attempt to save herself from the gallows, she declared that she was pregnant. This was confirmed by a jury of married women. The memory remains about the bandits in a number of placenames in the area, for example Llety'r Gwylliaid (bandits' lodging) and Llety'r Lladron (robbers' lodging) near Bwlch Oerddrws.

== Modern times ==
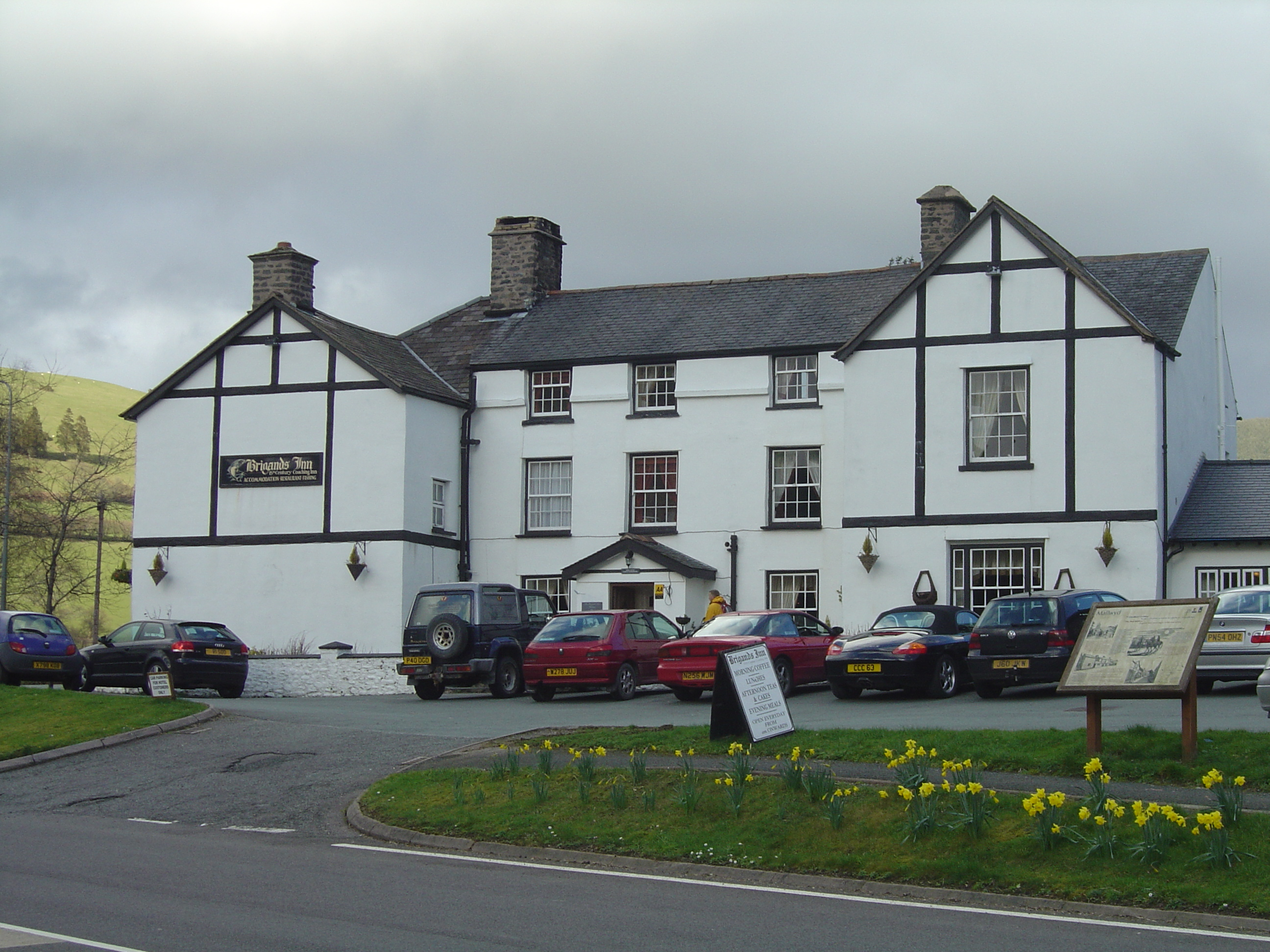
Brigands Inn, Mallwyd

In 1936 and 1938 locals dressed up and re-enacted tales of the bandits on film. The second of these films was in colour and is believed to have been the first ever colour film produced in Wales.

The pub in Mallwyd is named Brigands Inn, although that name is a modern concoction, having previously been called Bury's Hotel.
