= Matthew Brwmffild =

Matthew Brwmffild (fl. 1525–1545) was a Welsh poet. He is believed to have been from the Maelor area.

Around 1520 he wrote a number of poems in praise of Rhisiart ap Rhys ap Dafydd Llwyd, of Gogerddan, and in 1539, of Rhys ap Howel of Porthamyl, Anglesey. His other subjects include Lewis Gwynn (died c.1552), and Siôn Wynn ap Meredith of Gwydyr (died c. 1559). All but one of his poems fell under the awdl, cywyddau and englynion genres. The Oxford Dictionary of National Biography reports that about twenty poems by him are recorded.
