= Cambrian Way =

Long distance footpath in Wales

Cambrian Way; Taith Cambria (Welsh)
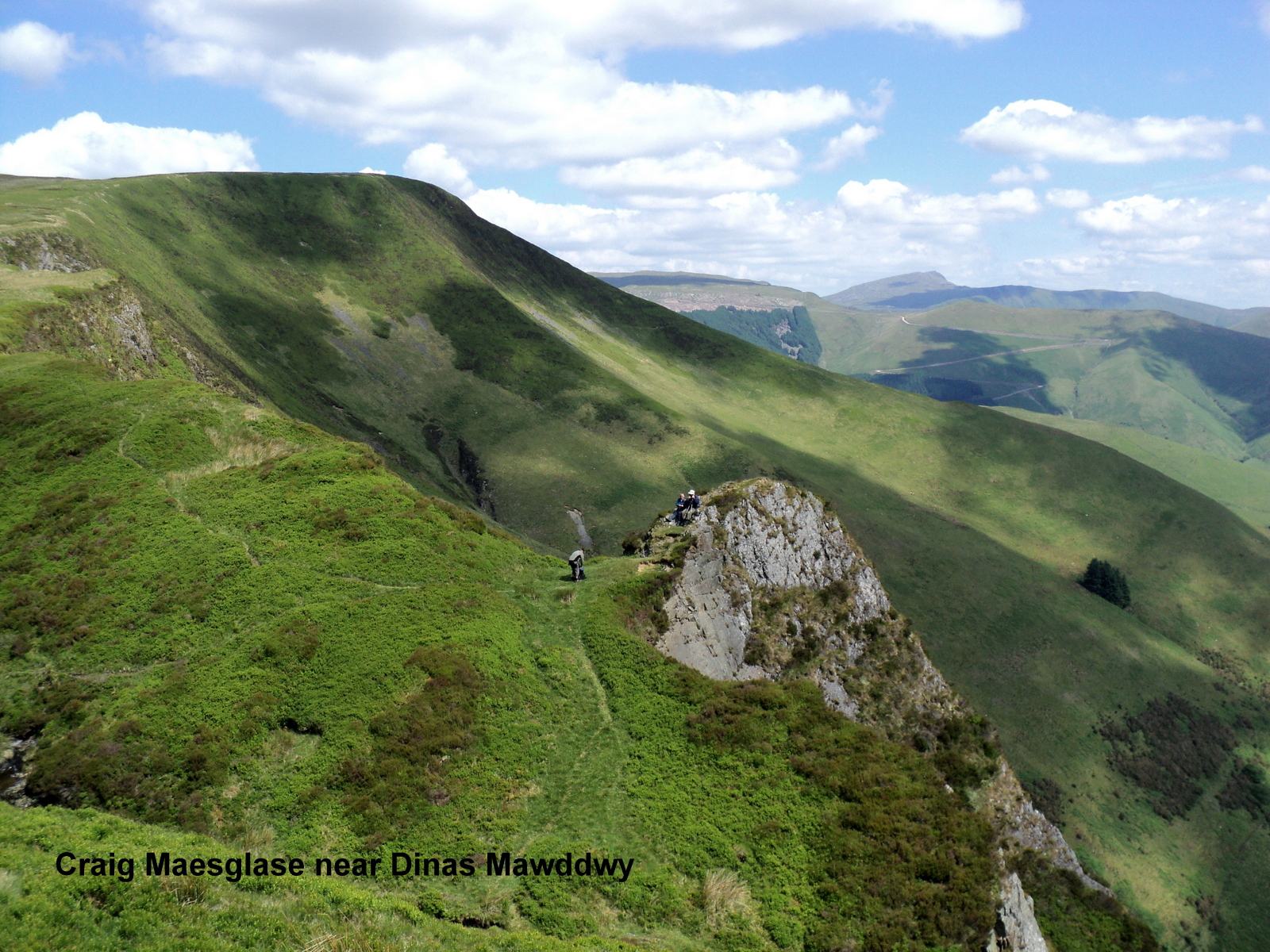
- View from the Cambrian Way, near Dinas Mawddwy, Gwynedd
- Length: 298 miles (480 km)
- Location: Wales, United Kingdom
- Designation: Long Distance Trail
- Trailheads: Cardiff Castle, South Wales Coast; Conwy Castle, North Wales Coast
- Use: Hiking
- Highest point: Snowdon, 1,085 m (3,560 ft)
- Difficulty: Strenuous
- Season: Summer
- Sights: Mountain scenery
- Hazards: Severe weather

The Cambrian Way is a long distance footpath in Wales, running from Cardiff to Conwy. Initially an unrecognised path, it was officially recognised in 2019, and is named after Cambria, a latinised name for Wales. It is primarily a mountain walk passing over many of the highest and most scenic areas of Wales. It was pioneered in the 1960s and 1970s by walker Tony Drake, who later produced a guidebook of the walk.

Initially, the official recognition relates only to the approval of national park authorities and most local authorities involved in the waymarking of the route in lowland areas and this is expected to be completed in 2020. This is not as extensive as the waymarking of National Trails and does not include mountain areas where waymarking is not generally permitted. Following negotiation, the whole route is now marked on the 1:25,000 Ordnance Survey map.

== Distance ==
The main route originally ran for 291 miles (468 km), with approximately 78,025 feet (23,782 m) of ascent using the latest digital measurements from the Ordnance Survey's 'OS Maps' website. Previous estimates were 275 miles (443 km) and 60,795 feet (18,530 m) of ascent using paper maps and counting contours in 2008, and 288 miles (463 km) and 67,100 feet (20,500 m) of ascent using Ordnance Survey's 'Getamap' website in 2012. The latest measurements of ascent take into account the extra ascent of undulations between plotted points and are, therefore, considerably greater than previous estimates and probably more accurate, though they are still subject to a margin of error.

Following a number of changes to the route that are incorporated in the latest Cicerone guide, the main route has increased to approximately 479 km (298 miles) with a total ascent of 22,460 m (73,700 ft).

== The route ==
The Cambrian Way is a mountain walking route from Cardiff to Conwy traversing much of the highest, wildest and most scenically beautiful parts of Wales. It was pioneered by the late Anthony John Drake MBE (Tony Drake) (25 January 1925 – 7 March 2012). Originally conceived in 1967 with the intention of becoming a National Trail, the proposals floundered because of insurmountable opposition from landowners, farmers, county councils, national park authorities and the British Mountaineering Council. Rather than abandoning the project altogether, Drake realised that the route could be promoted as an unofficial walk provided that it followed a route along established rights of way or where the public had traditionally been allowed access, so in 1984 he published the first edition of his guidebook Cambrian Way – A Mountain Connoisseur's Walk. Further updated editions of the guidebook continued to be published, his last one being the 6th edition published in 2008. He continued unsuccessfully to campaign for official recognition of the walk throughout the rest of his life until ill health intervened a few years before his death in 2012. The 7th edition of the guide, updated by the newly formed Cambrian Way Trust, was in 2016. The route is only partially waymarked and requires advanced map reading and navigational experience in certain sections. The route is wholly within Wales, unlike the Offa's Dyke Path, which follows the Wales-England border. Accommodation is scarce along some parts of the walk, so diversions, some quite long, are needed unless a tent and provisions are carried.

In 2015, at the time that the Cambrian Way Trust was formed, working groups from Ramblers Cymru were in the process of surveying the whole of the route and throughout this process a number of route changes were agreed between the Trust and working groups to avoid some road walking and to take advantage of the most scenic routes. This was done in collaboration with the Brecon Beacons National Park Authority and the Snowdonia National Park Authority who made a number of suggestions of their own, in particular regarding bad weather alternative routes over the Rhinog Mountains. These changes were then incorporated in a new guidebook Walking The Cambrian Way, published in July 2019 by Cicerone.

It traverses Wales from Cardiff Castle near the south coast to Conwy Castle on the north coast and is purposely routed over the highest upland and mountainous terrain including the Black Mountains, Central Beacons and Black Mountain (all within the Brecon Beacons National Park), the Cambrian Mountains, Cadair Idris, and Snowdon.

=== Southern section ===
The starting point of the route is at Cardiff Castle, chosen for its good transport links and in order for the walk to become a coast to coast route from South Wales to North Wales. Despite the first day of the walk lacking any mountains, it follows a pleasant ridgeway walk from Cwm Nofydd north of Rhiwbina along the Cefn Onn Ridge to Rudry before joining the open common ridges bordering on the Vale of Usk. The Brecon Beacons National Park is entered just north of Pontypool and open moorland followed to the Blorenge, thence by steep descent to the town of Abergavenny. After ascending Sugar Loaf a horseshoe shaped route follows the finest ridges of the Black Mountains via Capel-y-ffin to Crickhowell. There follows an east to west traverse of the elevated ridges of the Brecon Beacons including Pen y Fan, the highest point in South Wales at 886 m (2906 ft). The moorland continues to the Black Mountain range, also known as the Carmarthen Fans, the largest common in Wales, before dropping to Llanddeusant and field country to Llandovery.

=== Central section ===
From Llandovery, the route follows the attractive River Towy valley at Rhandirmwyn, a once busy metal mining area. The remote path up the Doethie valley leads to the Ty'n-y-cornel Youth Hostel, the most isolated hostel in Wales and officially a Dark Skies site. The route follows the western side of the wild moorland and forest area known as the Elenydd, which includes the gathering grounds of the Elan Valley Reservoirs which serve Birmingham. After rambling country around Devil's Bridge and Ponterwyd, the route crosses the exposed massif of Plynlimon, with opportunities to view the sources of the River Severn and the River Wye. The hamlet of Dylife, once the workplace of 2,000 miners, now only has a few houses and the Star Inn. A mixture of forest and sheep grazing land leads through the windfarm on Mynydd Cemmaes and so to Mallwyd and Dinas Mawddwy.

=== Northern section ===
From Dinas Mawddwy the route enters its northern and arguably toughest section through the Snowdonia National Park, crossing Cadair Idris before entering Barmouth before tackling the Rhinog Mountains which, given their remoteness and the rugged nature of walking, are the highlight of the whole route. The lack of accommodation and the slow going and distance means that this section is the most challenging for the walker. From Maentwrog the route goes over Cnicht to Beddgelert before going over the highest summit in Wales, Snowdon. A further steeper ascent takes the hiker over Glyder Fawr and Glyder Fach into the Ogwen Valley, before the long final stage across the Carneddau to the finish of the route at Conwy Castle.

== History of the walk ==
After some involvement in planning sections of the Cotswold Way and Offa's Dyke Path in the 1950s, Tony Drake did some preliminary planning for a route from Gloucester to Snowdon via the Black Mountains, Brecon Beacons and Plynlimon. It was not until 1967 that it occurred to him to wonder why no one had proposed a long distance route over the principal mountains of Wales. The idea received enthusiastic response from the Ramblers' Association (now The Ramblers) and the Youth Hostels Association (England & Wales).

In 1968 the Cambrian Way Committee was formed and chaired by Drake. Groups from several different organisations, Ramblers, YHA, Brecon Beacons and Voluntary Wardens Association, were allocated sections to survey. The British Mountaineering Council was offered the Caernarvonshire section but turned out to be hostile to the whole concept. There was some disagreement as to which route should be taken in several places and where the start and finish should be. In the three subsequent meetings a number of compromises were made, some of them for safety reasons, but there were still divided opinions on parts of the route.

The Countryside Commission had the responsibility for making recommendations to the Secretaries of State for the Environment or for Wales for the creation of long distance paths (now called National Trails), under provisions of the National Parks & Access to the Countryside Act 1949 (since 1991 these duties in Wales have been taken over by the Countryside Council for Wales). Routes approved by the Secretary of State become the responsibility of the local authorities to create with a 100% grant from national funds. New rights of way can be created by agreement or compulsorily by creation order. The commission from the beginning made encouraging noises and first mentioned the Cambrian Way in its annual report for 1968. However, it was made clear that only restricted resources and the route was still "under consideration" for a number of years.

In April 1976 the Commission approved the Cambrian Way project in principle and in September 1977 started official consultations on the basis of a map showing both the Cambrian Way Committee's route and the Commission's Preferred Route which differed in many respects. All the principal summits in Snowdonia were omitted. The route was to go over the Aran Mountains and the Arenig Mountains instead of the Rhinog Mountains and Cadair Idris. The crossover from Black Mountains to Brecon Beacons was to be via Mynydd Llangorse.

Following opposition from many quarters, the commission issued another line in January 1980 called a Consultation Route. This time the Cambrian Way Committee's route was not shown on the map, though the new route was closer to it than the 1977 line. Snowdon was included but still not the ridge of the Carneddau, Cadair Idris was included and a route to the seaward side of the Rhinog Mountains instead of a route over the Aran Mountains, where in the meantime an access row had blown up. The Black Mountains were omitted altogether following pressure from the Brecon Beacons National Park committee.

In 1982 a compromise route called the "Consultation Route" was put forward, but strong objections were encountered from several bodies and it became clear that many more compromises would be needed to get approval. The initial enthusiasm of the Countryside Commission waned and the proposals were abandoned. With his hopes of official recognition shattered, Drake decided to publish his first guidebook of his unofficial route in 1984, with much greater freedom to define a route of his own preference. This was not the very first book of the Cambrian Way to be published, as he was pipped to the post by Richard Sale with his book A Cambrian Way, though this took a different route in some places and was not designed as a compact guidebook to be carried on a walk, meaning that Drake's book became the definitive guide to the Cambrian Way.

== Future of the Cambrian Way ==
In accordance with a codicil to Tony Drake's will, the copyright of the guidebook and Cambrian Way website were left to a trust, which was to be formed by the three people who had been helping out during the latter years of his life. It was not until 1 October 2015 that the trust was officially formed, by which time one of the original helpers had died and another had expressed his wish to resign, leaving just one of the three named in the codicil remaining. However, Tony Drake also left a legacy to The Ramblers for maintaining and improving the Cambrian Way, and the working group that was set up to oversee this included members who were willing to become trustees of the Cambrian Way Trust.

=== Cambrian Way Trust ===
The Cambrian Way Trust currently has four Trustees and its purposes are:

(1) The promotion of the Cambrian Way as a long distance walk as a benefit to the public.

(2) To monitor the Cambrian Way route for improvements obstacles and variations.

(3) Directly or through the making of grants and/or the persuasion of others to improve maintain and repair the Cambrian Way.

(4) The publication of future versions of the Cambrian Way as a guide to walkers and to maintain improve and adapt The Cambrian Way Website so as to improve the usefulness of the site to walkers and sponsors.

(5) To deal with such other matters connected or related to the provision of the Cambrian Way as a long distance walk as the Trustees think fit.

=== The working groups ===
These groups consist mostly of members of Ramblers Cymru, the Welsh section of The Ramblers. Task groups from local areas will undertake work in their own locality, coordinated by the working group. Their objectives are:

(1) To survey the route and its variants to establish the condition of the route including any stiles, fences and gates.

(2) To establish where waymarking would be beneficial and appropriate and to seek permission from landowners to allow such waymarks. It is not considered appropriate to do so over mountain tops, but it would be beneficial at lower levels through farmland where paths are not always easy to follow.

(3) To report any obstacles along the route and suggest any alternatives to the route that it is considered would improve it for any reason. By consultation with the Cambrian Way Trust, decisions can be made as to whether these should be incorporated into future editions of the guidebook and promoted on the Cambrian Way website.

(4) To liaise with landowners, County Councils and National Park Authorities as to what action should be taken to rectify any problems and/or improve the route.

(5) To liaise with existing accommodation providers and campsites as listed in the guidebook and to seek addition establishments, particularly in remote areas.

(6) To promote the Cambrian Way by whatever means are considered appropriate through The Ramblers and other organisations.

In August 2019 Oliver Wicks from Ramblers Cymru said, "We have currently completed waymarking the route up to and including the Brecon Beacons and hope to have completed the entire route by the new year." In June 2022 the Ordnance Survey placed the route of the Cambrian Way on their maps. A new guide to the Cambrian Way was published in July 2019.
