= Llanymawddwy =

Coordinates: 52.757°N 3.627°W

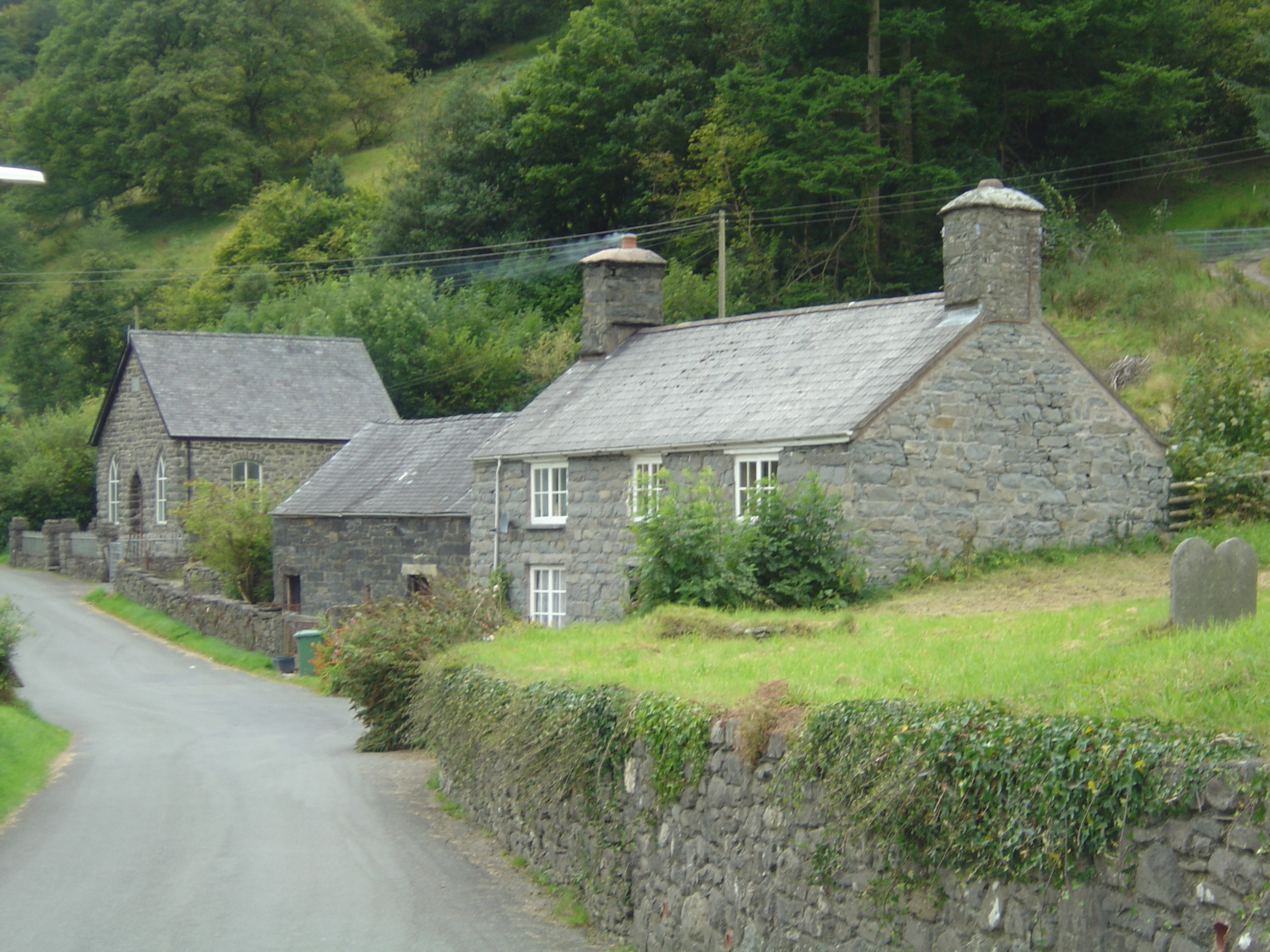
- Llanymawddwy

- Location within Gwynedd
- OS grid reference: SH902189
- Community: Mawddwy
- Principal area: Gwynedd
- Country: Wales
- Sovereign state: United Kingdom
- Post town: Machynlleth
- Postcode district: SY20
- Dialling code: 01650
- Police: North Wales
- Fire: North Wales
- Ambulance: Welsh
- UK Parliament: Dwyfor Meirionnydd
- Senedd Cymru – Welsh Parliament: Dwyfor Meirionnydd

Llanymawddwy (Welsh pronunciation) is a village in the community of Mawddwy in south-east Gwynedd, Wales, which is to the north of the larger village of Dinas Mawddwy, on the minor road which connects Dinas Mawddwy to Llanuwchllyn over Bwlch y Groes. The most notable building is the parish church dedicated to Saint Tydecho, where the tradition of singing Matins endures.

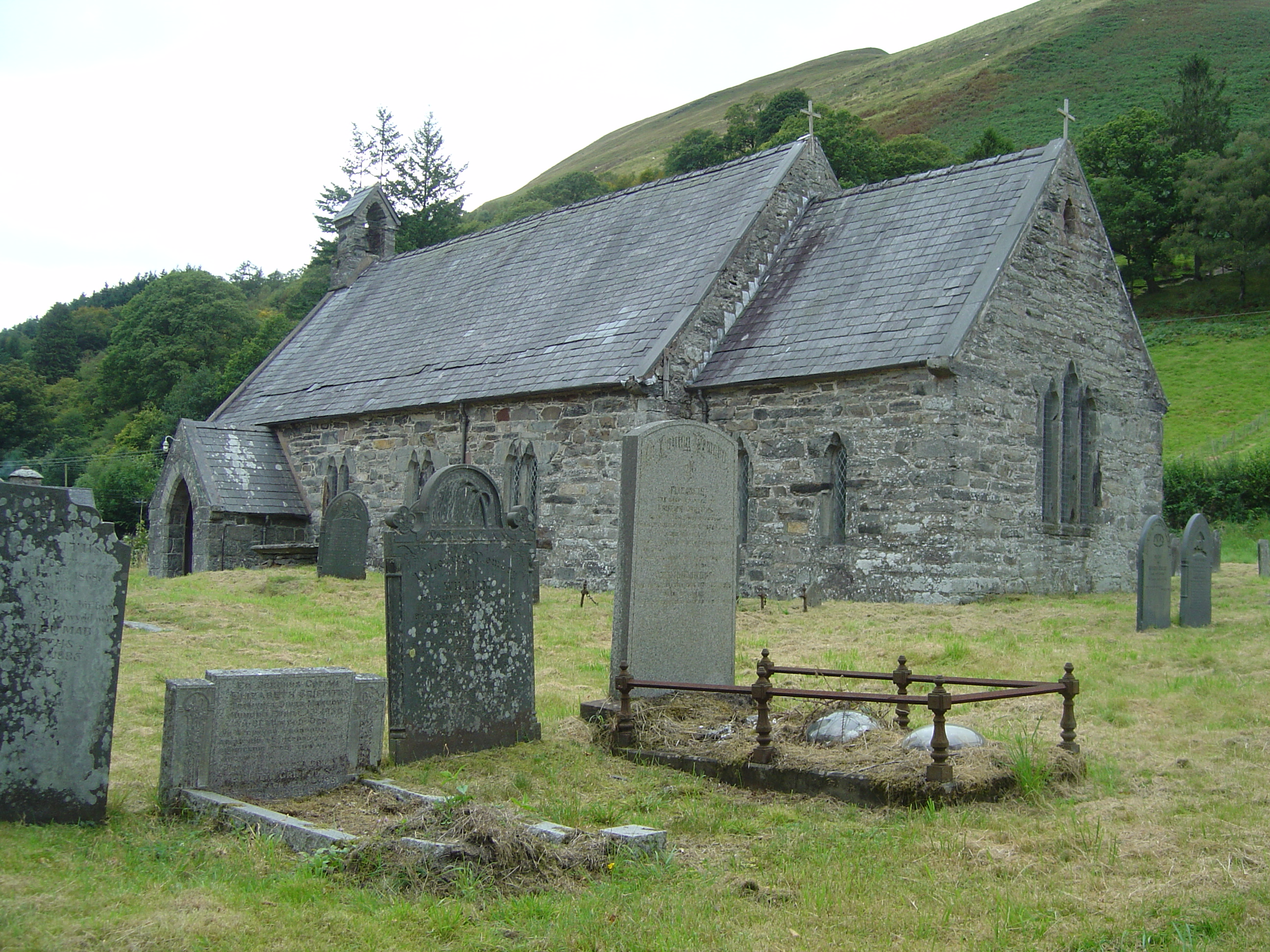
St Tydecho Church

A. G. Edwards, the first Archbishop of the disestablished Church in Wales, was born in Llanymawddwy in 1848.

== Folklore ==
According to local tradition, Bryn Hall was once haunted by a headless horseman. The haunting is said to have ceased after a grave belonging to the Lord's illegitimate child was found near the hall.
