= 2024 Talerddig train collision =

Rail accident in Powys, Wales

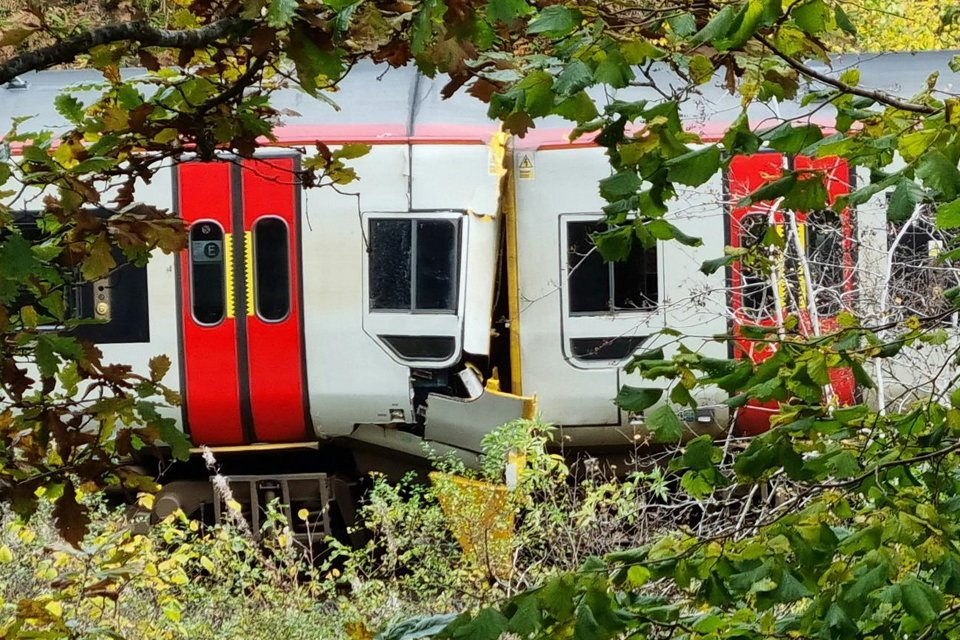
- View of the accident site - train 1S71 is shown on the left of picture and train 1J25 on the right.

Details
- Date: 21 October 2024; 19:26 BST (18:26 UTC)
- Location: Talerddig, Powys, Wales
- Coordinates: 52°35′28″N 3°35′02″W; SH 9276 0045
- Country: United Kingdom
- Line: Cambrian Line
- Operator: Transport for Wales Rail
- Service: 1J25 18:31 Shrewsbury–Aberystwyth, operated by 158841; 1S71 19:09 Machynlleth–Shrewsbury, operated by 158824
- Incident type: Head-on collision
- Cause: Signal passed at danger due to: low railhead adhesion; Driver error; Defective sanding equipment on train; Defective rail adhesion equipment on track

Statistics
- Trains: 2
- Passengers: 32
- Crew: 5
- Deaths: 1
- Injured: 15
Location diagram

On 21 October 2024, a passenger train heading westwards from Shrewsbury to Aberystwyth on the Cambrian Line in Wales collided head-on with another train heading in the opposite direction on a section of single line approximately 900 m (1/2 mile) west of the passing loop at Talerddig, Powys. The trains had been scheduled to pass at the loop, but the first train failed to stop. Fifteen people were injured in the crash, and one passenger subsequently died. A preliminary investigation found evidence of low wheel/rail adhesion and that the sanders, which help increase adhesion when braking, may not have been working. A formal investigation into the accident was opened on 22 October, 2024, with an interim report published in April 2025, and the final report being issued on 18 June 2026.

== Background ==
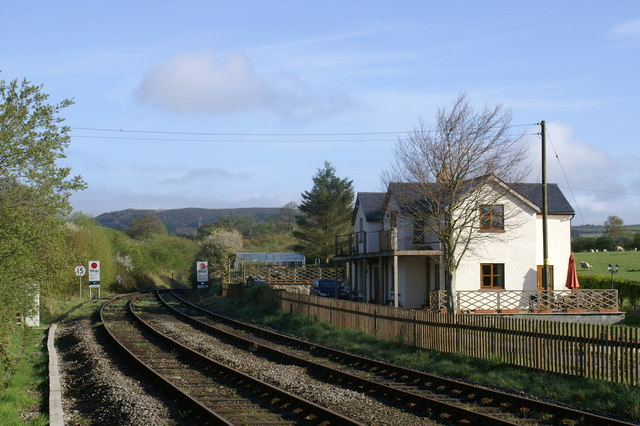
The passing loop at Talerddig, looking north-west towards Machynlleth

The Cambrian Line is a railway line that runs from Shrewsbury in England across the Welsh border to Aberystwyth and Pwllheli, passing over the Cambrian Mountains in central Wales. Most of the route is single track, with passing loops provided at strategic points to allow crossings of trains in opposite directions. Since 2011, the line has been controlled by European Rail Traffic Management System (ERTMS), which replaces traditional signalling with in-cab train control. As of 2024, trains are operated by Transport for Wales Rail.

Talerddig was a station and passing loop at the summit of the Cambrian Line between Caersws and Machynlleth. The station opened in 1900 and was closed in 1965, but the passing loop remained in use and is a regular crossing point for trains. In the westbound direction, trains approach Talerddig on a rising gradient of 1 in 80 (1.25%). At Talerddig passing loop, the line is level for about a quarter of a mile (400 m); this is the summit of the line, at an elevation of 693 feet (211 m) above mean sea level. From this level stretch, the line descends at a gradient of 1 in 56 (1.79%), steepening to 1 in 52 (1.92%) after the first mile down to the former Llanbrynmair station. In steam days, most eastbound trains needed assistance from Machynlleth up to Talerddig: in some cases, a train might have three locomotives – two at the front and one at the rear. Unbraked goods trains always had assistance at the rear if not also at the front, because of the danger that a broken coupling could result in a runaway wagon.

== Trains involved ==
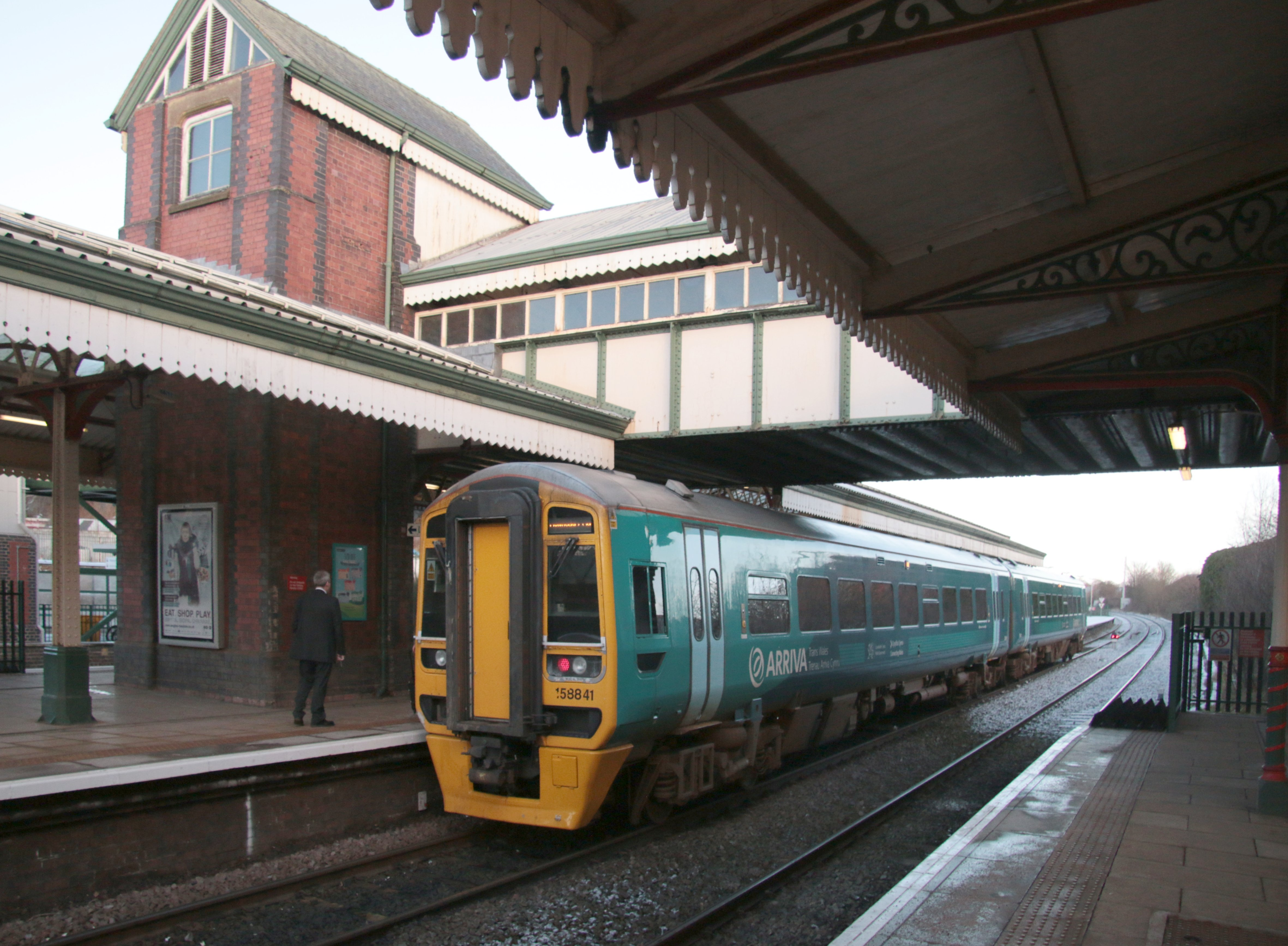
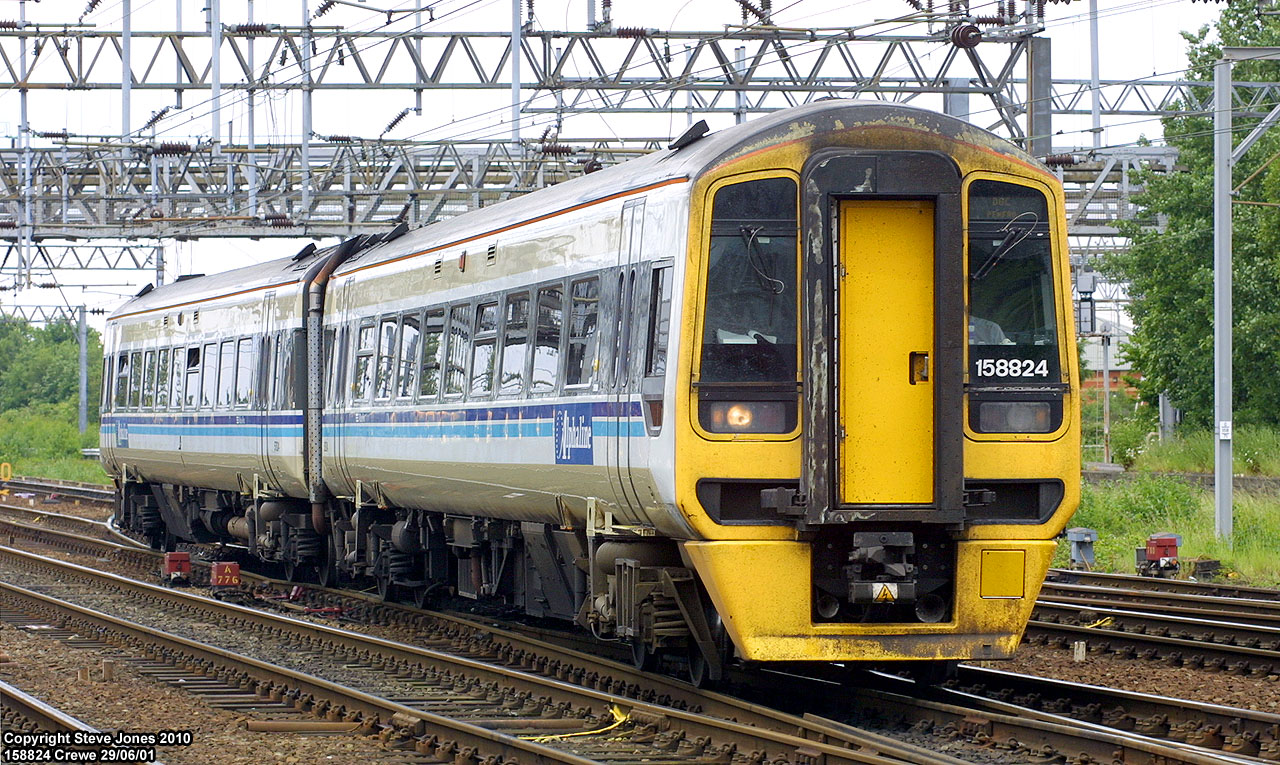
The two trains involved, number 158841 at Wrexham General in 2015 and 158824 at Crewe in 2001

On the day of the collision, the 18:31 westbound passenger train from Shrewsbury to Aberystwyth (train reporting number 1J25) was formed of a two-coach class 158 diesel multiple unit number 158841, built between 1989 and 1992. At the time of the collision, it had 37 passengers on board.

The 19:09 eastbound passenger train from Machynlleth to Shrewsbury (train reporting number 1S71) was formed of another two-coach class 158 unit, number 158824. It had four passengers on board.

== Collision ==
On 21 October 2024, the two trains were due to pass at Talerddig. The westbound train to Aberystwyth, 1J25, was signalled to enter the loop and wait for the approaching eastbound train to pass it on the main line. It entered the loop but failed to stop, and continued beyond the loop, colliding head-on with the eastbound train to Shrewsbury, 1S71, at 19:26 BST (18:26 UTC), approximately 900 m (1/2 mile) west of the loop. Investigations indicated that at the time of the impact, the Aberystwyth train was travelling at approximately 39 km/h (24 mph), and the Shrewsbury train had slowed to approximately 11 km/h (7 mph). Before the impact, the driver of the Shrewsbury to Aberystwyth train had entered the saloon to warn passengers of the impending collision.

Fifteen people were taken to hospital with injuries, four of them serious, but none were described as life-threatening or life-changing; one passenger subsequently died. He was reported to have had a heart attack.

Unit 158824 on the Shrewsbury train sustained severe damage to one of its cabs. This was the second accident that 158824 had been involved in. In July 2008, it collided with a vehicle on a level crossing between Shrewsbury and Wrexham General. Repairs to the unit took seven months to complete.

The crash was the first collision between passenger trains in Wales since the Severn Tunnel rail accident in 1991. The death of the passenger is believed to be the first fatality on an ERTMS-controlled line in the UK.

== Response and aftermath ==
The Welsh Ambulance Service, EMRTS Cymru, British Transport Police (BTP), Dyfed-Powys Police, Mid and West Wales Fire and Rescue Service. Coastguard and Wales Air Ambulance helicopters also attended the scene. The main road between north and south Wales, the A470, was closed as a result of the accident. Passengers from the two trains continued their journeys by bus. The railway between Machynlleth and Shrewsbury was closed as a result of the accident.

The two trains were separated on 24 October and taken to Machynlleth by rail the next day. The A470 reopened to traffic on 25 October. As a result of the accident, plans to close the A470 between 31 October and Christmas were postponed, with the work rescheduled to take place early in 2025. As a direct result of the accident, Transport for Wales cancelled four services on the Cambrian Line until further notice. Other services were reduced from four carriages to two. Angel Trains, owner of the units involved in the accident, were unable to decide whether or not to repair the trains, as they were likely to be quarantined by the Rail Accident Investigation Branch (RAIB) for several months. The units are due to be replaced by Class 197 trains in 2026, meaning that repairs may not be justified.

The inquest into the death of the passenger opened on 30 October. It was stated that the cause of death had not yet been identified. The inquest was adjourned.

== Investigation ==
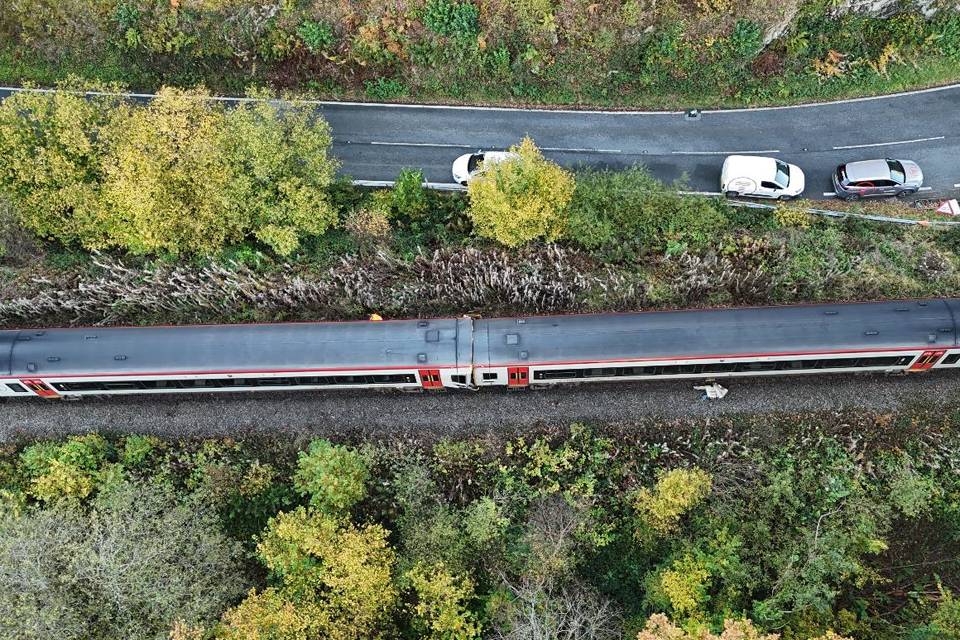
Aerial view of the accident site – train 1S71 is shown on the left of picture and train 1J25 on the right

A team of RAIB inspectors was despatched to the accident site. A formal investigation into the accident was opened on 22 October. The RAIB's initial inspection of the track found evidence of low wheel/rail adhesion, and they stated that the possibility the train may have suffered wheel slide while braking would be investigated. Investigators completed their on-site investigations by 25 October, at which point the re-opening of the line on 28 October was announced. BTP also opened an investigation into the accident.

The preliminary RAIB report indicated that the Aberystwyth-bound train failed to stop after application of both the regular service brakes and then the emergency brakes. The train's sanders, which help increase adhesion when braking, may not have been working, as the investigation showed that the leading vehicle sanding hoses of 158841 were "blocked and apparently unable to discharge sand". A Rail Head Treatment Train had visited the line four times in the previous five days, including the night before the accident.

The RAIB published an interim report into the accident on 30 April 2025. The final report was published on 18 June 2026. Nine recommendations were made and a learning point was identified.

The investigation concluded that there were five causal factors and that driver error was a major cause of the accident, under conditions of low wheel/rail adhesion. The driver of train 1J25 had braked, then coasted, then braked again on the approach to Talerddig. Had continuous braking been used, the train would have stopped within Talerddig loop. Also, the driver did not activate the emergency sanders when it overran. Another major factor was that the train's sanders were not fully working. In addition, the Traction Gel Applicator was not working.

== See also ==
- Abermule train collision, 1921 collision on the same line
- 2021 Salisbury rail crash, previous most recent collision between passenger trains in the UK. Low rail adhesion conditions were a major factor.
