= Carno railway station =

Disused railway station in Powys, Wales

Carno
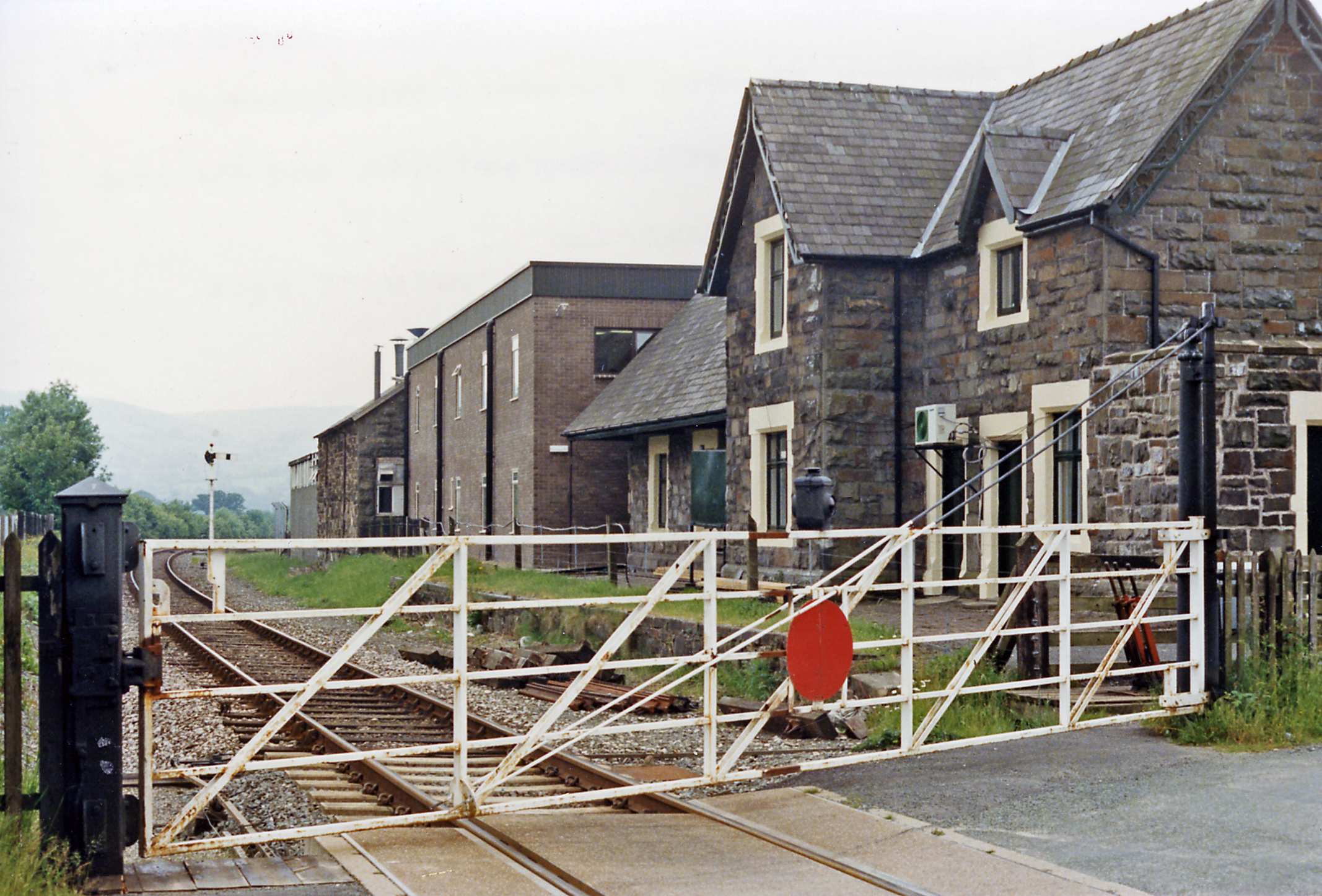
- The former railway station in 1986

General information
- Location: Carno, Powys; Wales
- Coordinates: 52.5646°N 3.5381°W
- Grid reference: SN957974
- Platforms: 2

Other information
- Status: Disused

History
- Original company: Newtown and Machynlleth Railway
- Pre-grouping: Cambrian Railways
- Post-grouping: Great Western Railway

Key dates
- 3 January 1863: Opened
- 14 June 1965: Closed
Location

Carno railway station served the village of Carno, in Powys, Wales. It was a stop on the Cambrian Line that was part of the Newtown and Machynlleth Railway. The station was closed in 1965 as part of the Beeching Cuts, though there are proposals to reopen it.

== History ==
Carno station was opened by the Newtown and Machynlleth Railway, which had been incorporated in 1857 to connect the Llanidloes and Newtown Railway with Aberystwyth via Machynlleth. The 22 3/4-mile (36.6 km) line was leased to the Oswestry and Newtown Railway and services began on 3 January 1863 from Machynlleth, calling at Moat Lane Junction, Pontdolgoch, Carno, Llanbrynmair and Cemmes Road. The line was single with passing loops at Carno, Llanbrynmair and Cemmes Road.

The station was situated to the north of Carno, which had a population of 717 in 1901. Two platforms were provided with the main station buildings and generously sized goods shed situated on the down platform. A signal box with 24 levers was erected at the west end of the down platform; it had a staff of four throughout the 1930s.

The station was closed to goods traffic on 29 July 1963 and to passenger traffic on 14 June 1965 following the recommendation for its closure in the Beeching Report.

The line remained open and the station buildings were incorporated into the adjacent Laura Ashley factory complex until its closure in 2005. The signal box remained in service until 21 October 1988, when automatic half barriers were introduced on the level crossing at the west end of the station.

Preceding station	Historical railways	Following station
Talerddig; Line open, station closed	Cambrian Railways; Newtown and Machynlleth Railway	Pontdolgoch; Line open, station closed

== The site today ==
The station building remains extant and is in private ownership. Trains continue to pass through the former station site on the Cambrian Line.

== Proposed reopening ==
In 2002, the Carno Station Action Group was set up to campaign for the reopening of the station. An independent report commissioned by the group about the reopening of the station was met positively by Arriva Trains Wales and Network Rail.

In 2009, the Welsh Assembly agreed to examine the proposal as part of the Cambrian Rail Study.

In 2014, the Welsh Assembly confirmed Arriva Trains Wales and Network Rail broadly agreed with an independent report recommending the reopening of a station at Carno. However, a new station would need to be built as the original Victorian building (which was incorporated into the former Laura Ashley factory) is in private ownership.

In 2015, the Shrewsbury and Aberystwyth Rail Passenger Association released an aims document that mentions the possibility of reopening the station, along with Bow Street and Hanwood stations.

In January 2016, Welsh Transport Minister Edwina Hart confirmed that Arriva Trains Wales and Network Rail agreed with the conclusions of an independent report in favour of the station's reopening.

On the 10th anniversary of the original petition to the Welsh Assembly, the Carno Station Action Group started a new petition to keep the pressure on the Assembly to reopen the station. The Cabinet Secretary for Economy and Infrastructure for the Welsh Assembly, Ken Skates, confirmed in a letter to the Carno Station Action group in October 2017 that Carno was on the list of stations to go forward to Stage Two of the New Stations Assessment Programme. Plans to reopen the station reached the third and final stage in September 2019 when the station was shortlisted for further assessment by Network Rail. If successful, plans for the station will progress to the funding stage.
