= Pontdolgoch =

Coordinates: 52.53126°N 3.45938°W

- Location within Powys
- OS grid reference: SO011935
- Community: Caersws
- Principal area: Powys
- Preserved county: Powys
- Country: Wales
- Sovereign state: United Kingdom
- Post town: CAERSWS
- Postcode district: SY17
- Dialling code: 01650
- Police: Dyfed-Powys
- Fire: Mid and West Wales
- Ambulance: Welsh
- UK Parliament: Montgomeryshire and Glyndŵr
- Senedd Cymru – Welsh Parliament: Montgomeryshire

Pontdolgoch is a very small village in Powys, Wales. It is located on the A470 road, some 2 miles (3.2 km) northwest of Caersws. The River Carno flows through the village.

Pontdolgoch's name translates as "bridge over the red meadow", and is derived from an ancient, and bloody, battle.

Pontdolgoch was home of a pub and restaurant, the Talkhouse, until it closed in 2010.

The village was served by Pontdolgoch railway station, closed in 1965, on the Cambrian Line.
