= Newtown and Machynlleth Railway =

Welsh railway line

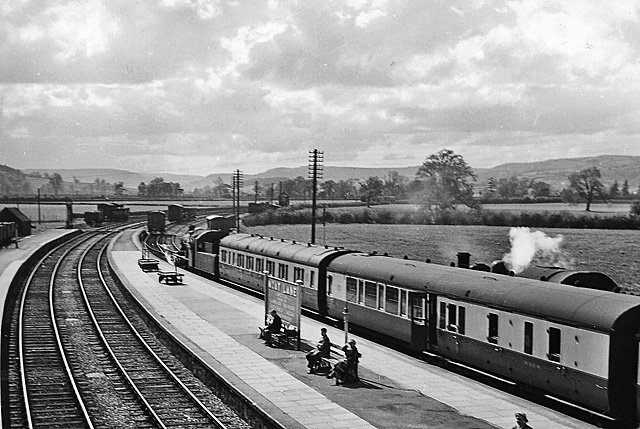
- Moat Lane Junction, a joint station with the Llanidloes and Newtown Railway. The N&MR to the Cambrian Mountains and Cardigan Bay proceeds ahead, the L&NR to Builth Wells proceeds to the left. Two LMS Ivatt Class 2 2-6-0's work within the station, 11 May 1957.

Overview
- Status: Operational, Cambrian Line
- Owner: Original: Newtown and Machynlleth Railway; Current: Network Rail
- Locale: Mid Wales
- Termini: Newtown (Powys); Machynlleth
- Stations: Scafell Halt, Moat Lane Junction, Caersws, Pontdolgoch, Carno, Talerddig, Llanbrynmair, Commins Coch Halt, Cemmes Road

Service
- System: Cambrian Railways
- Operator(s): Original: Cambrian Railways; Current: Transport for Wales

History
- Opened: 1862

Technical
- Line length: 23 mi (37 km)
- Track gauge: 1,435 mm (4 ft 8 1/2 in) standard gauge
Route map
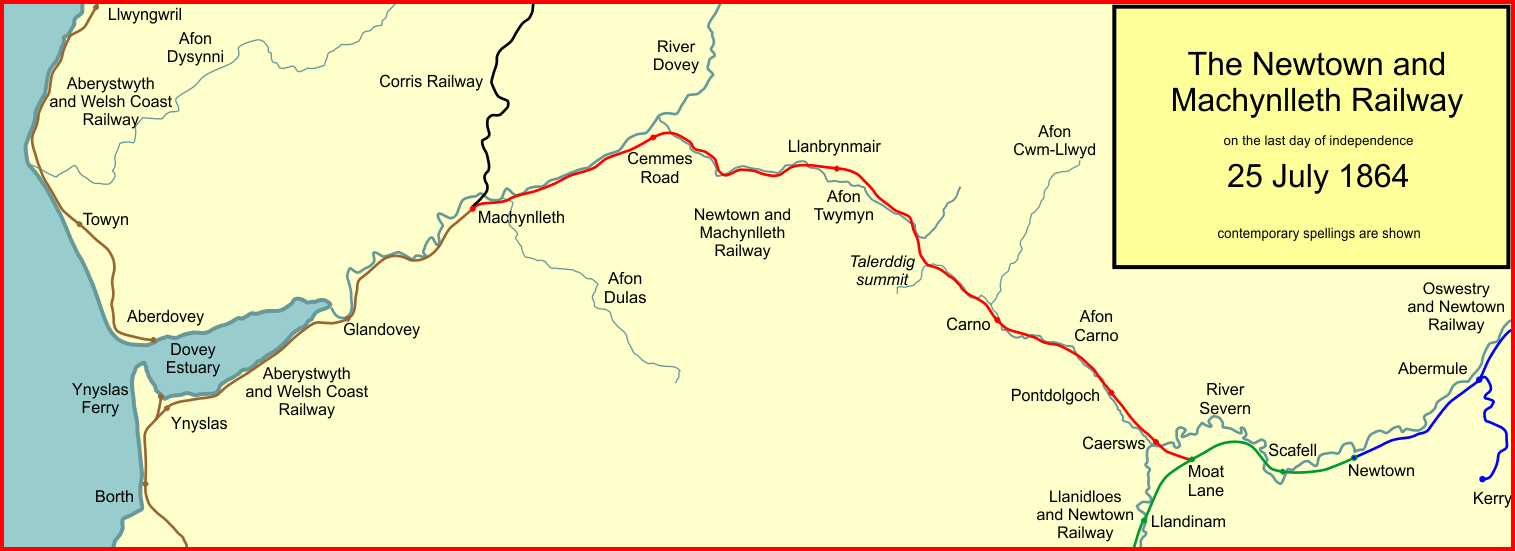

The Newtown and Machynlleth Railway was a railway company in Wales. It built a line from a junction with the Llanidloes and Newtown Railway near Caersws to the market town of Machynlleth; the line opened in 1862. Newtown had become the hub of railway lines in the district. Machynlleth was an important town, and extension from there to Aberystwyth and to the coast northward was in the minds of the promoters.

The topography of the district was challenging, and a practicable line had to be routed north of the most mountainous region, and climb steeply. There was a summit at Talerddig, 693 feet (211 m) above sea level; a 120-foot-deep (37 m) rock cutting was made at the summit, to mitigate the climb on the approaches. Another company, the Aberystwith and Welsh Coast Railway, built the line connecting Machynlleth to Aberystwyth, and also to Porthmadog and Pwllheli, and the Newtown and Machynlleth Railway company itself was incorporated into the Cambrian Railways company in 1864. Its line became the main access route for Aberystwyth and the coast, and remains in use at the present day.

== Conception ==
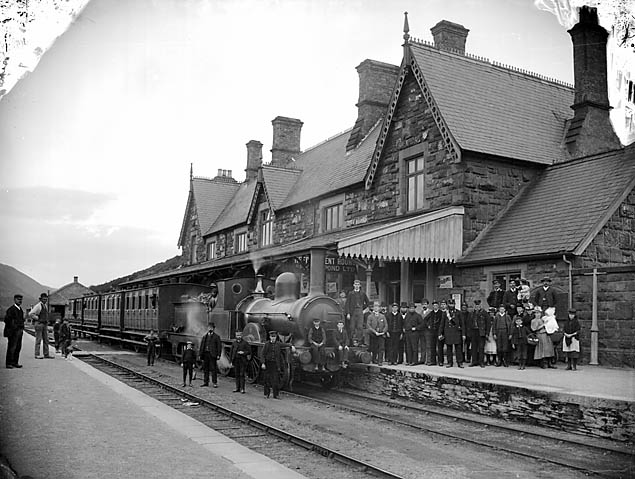
Machynlleth Station about 1885

In the mid 1850s the railway map of central Wales was still blank. The South Wales Railway opened progressively from 1850; it was in a tense alliance with the Great Western Railway, and ran along the south coast; there were several early mineral lines near its route. The Chester and Holyhead Railway, friendly to the London and North Western Railway ran along the north coast, and the Shrewsbury and Chester Railway demarcated the eastern border. Both the LNWR and the GWR had proposed railways into the interior, but both had withdrawn.

Newtown and Llanidloes were centres of flannel manufacture at the time, and in frustration promoted their own railway joining the towns. The Llanidloes and Newtown Railway was authorised in 1853 and opened in 1859. The L&NR was not connected to any other line, but encouraged by the development, another railway was locally promoted: the Oswestry and Newtown Railway. This was authorised in 1855 and opened in stages from 1860, connecting to the Shrewsbury and Chester Railway, and thence the developing English network, at Oswestry in Shropshire.

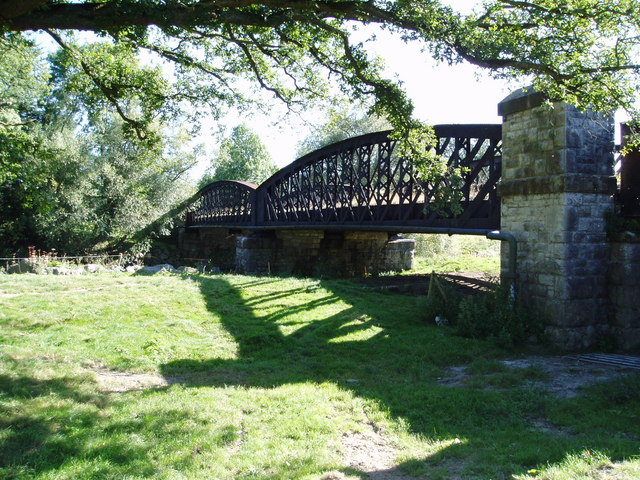
The twin spans of Penstrowed bridge, by which the N&MR crossed the River Severn.

There was still a considerable expanse of undeveloped territory to the west and south of Newtown, and thoughts returned to railways covering longer distances. A line striking across Wales from northeast to the southwest, possibly developing an Atlantic coast port, seemed attractive, and this led to several ambitious schemes which was later attempted to be built by the Manchester and Milford Railway. Other routes were considered, and one joining Newtown to Aberystwyth was considered attractive. Avoiding the mountainous area surrounding Plynlimon, the easiest and obvious route lay in a sweep north through Talerddig to Machynlleth, an important market town. A solicitor based there, named David Howell, made energetic moves to form a railway scheme, beginning with a public meeting on 20 December 1856 at Machynlleth. There was support for a railway, and the engineer Benjamin Piercy prepared plans for a route. A 23-mile (37 km) line from the Llanidloes and Newtown Railway near Caersws to Machynlleth was shown to be feasible. It involved a climb from 412 feet (126 m) to a summit of 693 feet (211 m) at Talerddig with a maximum gradient of 1 in 71, and an even steeper descent to near sea level at Machynlleth with four miles (6 km) at 1 in 52 to 1 in 60.

Newtown and Machynlleth Railway Act 1857
- Act of Parliament
- Parliament of the United Kingdom
- Long title: An Act for making a Railway from the Llanidloes and Newtown Railway in the Parish of Llandinam in the County of Montgomery to the Town of Machynlleth in the same County.
- Citation: 20 & 21 Vict. c. cvi

Dates
- Royal assent: 27 July 1857

Text of statute as originally enacted

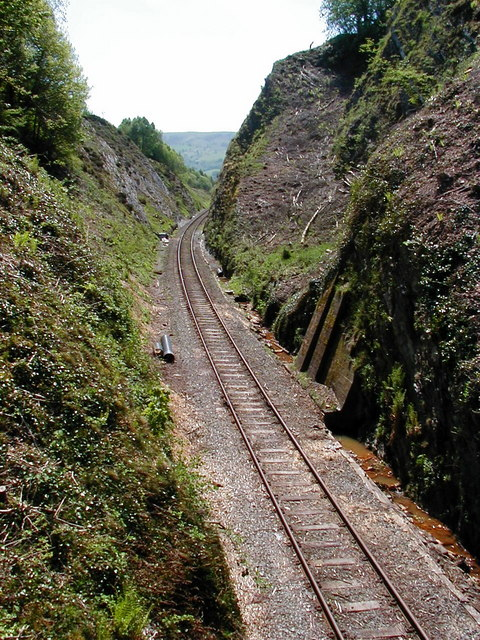
The cutting at Talerddig summit

The Newtown and Machynlleth Railway was incorporated by the Newtown and Machynlleth Railway Act 1857 (20 & 21 Vict. c. cvi) of 27 July 1857, with authorised capital of £150,000. The bill was unopposed in Parliament. The first sod was cut in November 1858, the delay suggesting land acquisition and money-raising difficulties.

== Construction ==
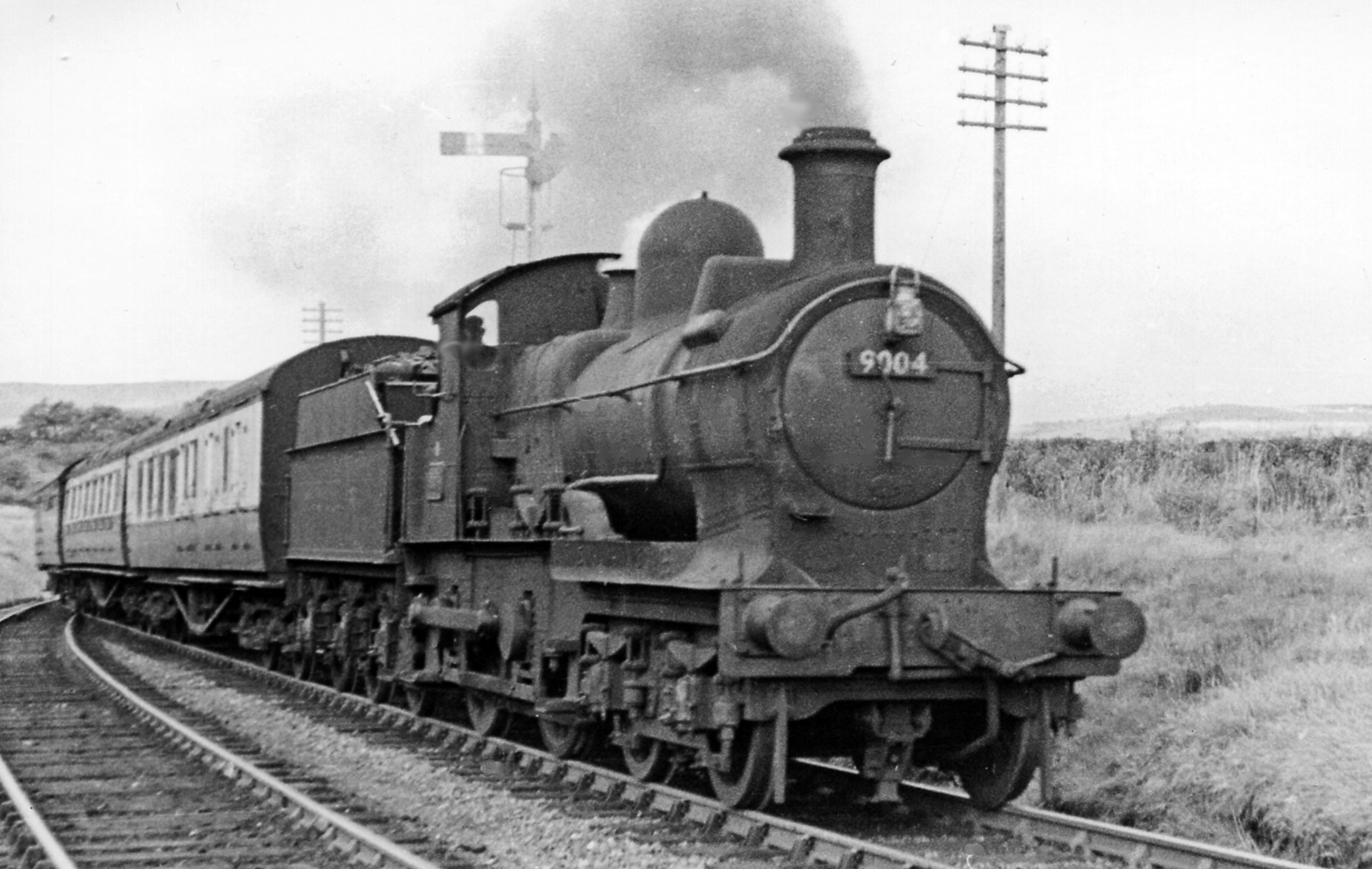
An Aberystwyth–Newtown train at Talerddig.

A contract for the construction was let to the partnership of David Davies and Thomas Savin, in the amount of £130,000, of which £23,000 was to be paid in paid-up shares and £5,000 as a loan. The terrain was not easy for the construction. There was to be a tunnel at the Talerddig summit, but this was changed to a cutting in the rock. Briwnant-Jones suggests that the rock material was found to be suitable for the construction of bridges on the line, and that the change had a beneficial effect on the contractors' costs. When made, the cutting was 120 feet (37 m) in depth: for some years this was the world's deepest railway cutting. Flat-bottom rails were specified for the permanent way, but this was changed to bullhead rail between Caersws and Talerddig.

The partnership of David Davies and Thomas Savin were established and successful railway contractors for the project, and it was their money which enabled the scheme to go ahead, by their agreeing to construct the works and take only shares as payment, when share subscriptions did not come forward as hoped. Savin had plans to develop the coastal area from Aberystwyth northwards as far as Pwllheli, including the construction of hotels and other amenities. Davies was more cautious, seeing this as reckless overreaching, and the difference of view led to the partnership breaking up on 29 October 1860. Davies continued the work on the N&MR; by this time he was the majority shareholder.

The N&MR company had hoped that the Great Western Railway would work the line, but the GWR declined, and the N&MR was worked by the Oswestry and Newtown Railway. The N&MR considered itself to be aligned to the Great Western Railway. The other Newtown railways were in a loose alliance which now included the planned Oswestry, Ellesmere and Whitchurch Railway, which was to connect with the London and North Western Railway system at Whitchurch. Those companies negotiated with the LNWR regarding working arrangements, coordination of timetabling and through ticketing. This had not been disclosed to the N&MR, which considered the others to be acting in bad faith. Fearing isolation the N&MR quickly arranged for the GWR to work the line for 40 per cent of gross earnings; the N&MR shareholders were to be guaranteed an annual dividend of 5 per cent. However after ratification of the deal by N&MR shareholders, the GWR failed to get approval from its own shareholders.

The GWR negotiated further but sought to impose conditions which the N&MR found unacceptable, and in December 1862 the discussions were at an end. Davies was asked, at this late stage, to build the stations. The GWR had given the inadequacy—perhaps absence—of the station buildings as a reason for refusing to work the line.

== Opening and lease to the O&NR ==
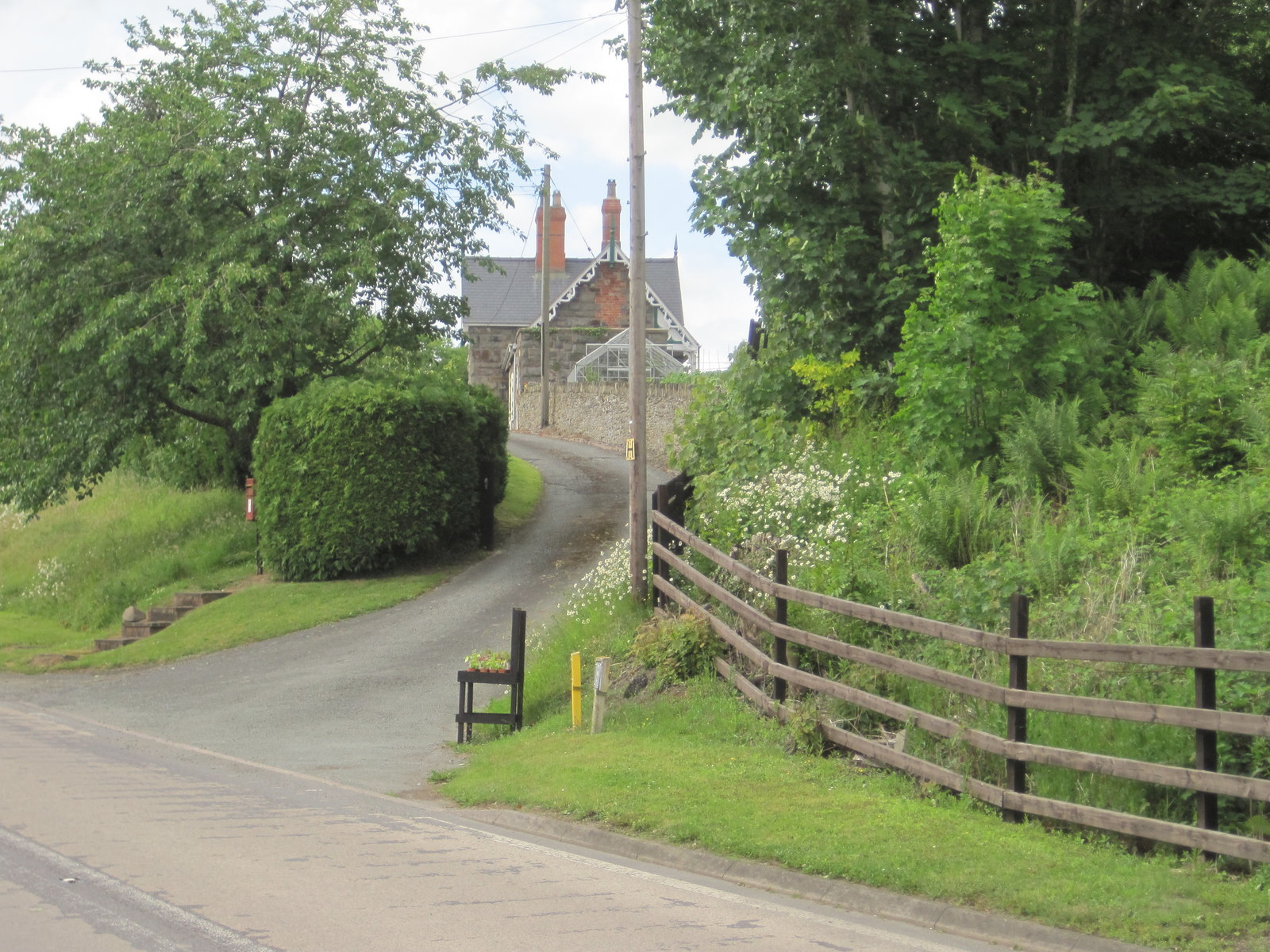
Site of Pontdolgoch railway station.

The N&MR now set about getting Board of Trade approval to open the line for passenger operation, and Captain Henry Tyler made two visits; on the second occasion, 30 December 1862, he approved the opening subject to some conditions. Trains started operating the following day, 31 December 1862. It appears that the construction contractor (Davies) conveyed some goods wagons and possibly passengers unofficially before that. A grand opening ceremony was held on 3 January 1863.

An eastbound stopping train at Machynlleth in 1951

The rupture with the GWR over working arrangements having proved final, the company called on the Oswestry and Newtown Railway to work its line; the O&NR was already working the Llanidloes and Newtown Railway. In practice it was Thomas Savin actually working the O&NR by contract, and the contract was extended to cover the N&MR also. The limited motive power and rolling stock of the N&MR was inadequate, and the N&MR arranged with David Davies to spend up to £20,000 on additional rolling stock as a matter of urgency. The negotiation with the O&NR developed into an agreement to amalgamate; the agreement, arranged under the Oswestry and Newtown Railway Act 1860 (23 & 24 Vict. c. ci), meant that the O&NR leased the N&MR for 100 years. It was signed on 31 August, and backdated to 1 March 1863.

== Aberystwith and Welsh Coast Railway ==
Aberystwyth had a population of 5,561 in 1861. The Newtown and Machynlleth Railway promoters had long harboured designs on reaching Aberystwyth; indeed Thomas Savin thought the entire coast from there northwards needed to be developed by a railway and hotels. Constructing the N&MR's own line exhausted its resources, and it was an independent company, officially spelt Aberystwith and Welsh Coast Railway, that was authorised by the Aberystwith and Welsh Coast Railway Act 1861 (24 & 25 Vict. c. clxxxi) on 22 July 1861. It was to build a line from Aberystwyth to Pwllheli, crossing the River Dyfi, anglicised as Dovey, near its mouth by a large bridge. There was to be a branch from the line to Machynlleth, on the south side of the Dovey. In fact doubts about the Dovey bridge and a measure of economic reality caused the A&WCR to build the Aberystwyth to Machynlleth section first, opening Machynlleth to Borth on 1 July 1863 and Borth to Abersytwyth to goods May 1864 and to passengers on 23 June 1864.

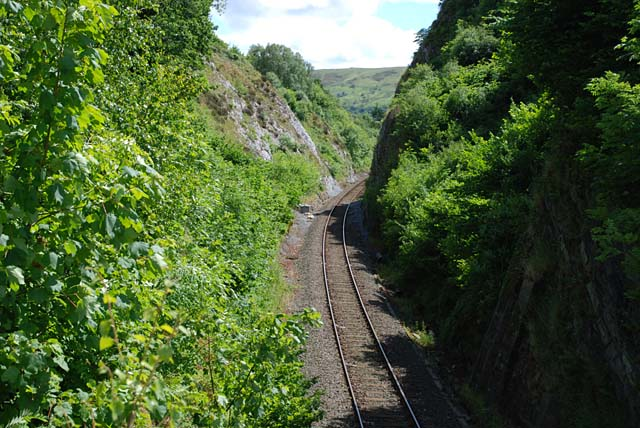
Talerddig cutting

Doubts about the Dovey bridge became firmer: there was an existing ferry from Ynyslas on the Aberystwyth line, to Aberdovey, so the A&WCR built its line northward from Aberdovey, opening in stages from 24 October 1863. The Dovey bridge scheme was abandoned, and later a line was built from Aberdovey to what became Dovey Junction, opening on 14 August 1867. In this way the Aberystwyth line and the Porthmadog and Pwllheli lines became directly accessible from Machynlleth and Oswestry.

== Joining the Cambrian Railways ==
On 25 July 1864 an amalgamation act, the Cambrian Railways Act 1864 (27 & 28 Vict. c. cclxii) was passed, forming the Cambrian Railways company. Its constituents were the Newtown and Machynlleth Railway, the Llanidloes and Newtown Railway, the Oswestry and Newtown Railway, and the Oswestry, Ellesmere and Whitchurch Railway. The Aberystwith and Welsh Coast Railway joined soon after.

== The present day ==
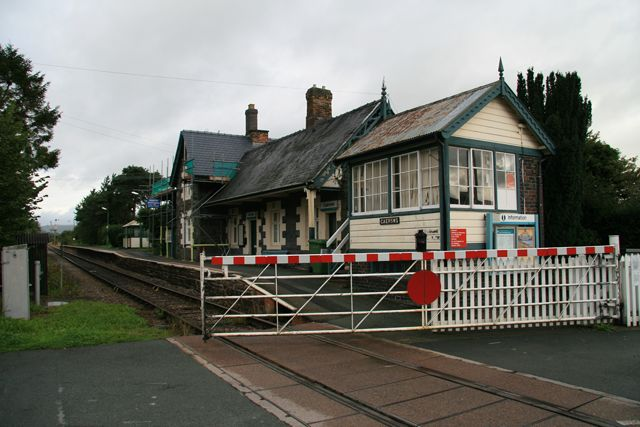
Caersws Station

The former Newtown and Machynlleth line continues in use, and carries the passenger service between Shrewsbury to Aberystwyth and Pwllheli. The line is single-track, with stations at Caersws and Machynlleth, with passing loops at Talerddig and Machynlleth. All other stations were closed during rationalization of the line in the 1960s.

== Gradients ==
From Moat Lane Junction the line climbed westbound steeply to Talerddig, 10 miles (16 km), in part at 1 in 80. The ascent on the other side of the summit eastbound was much steeper from Cemmes Road to Talerddig for 12 miles (19 km), with the final section through to Talerddig cutting with a gradient up to 1 in 52.

== Station list ==
- Machynlleth; opened 5 January 1863; still open;
- Cemmes Road; opened 5 January 1863; closed 14 June 1965;
- Commins Coch Halt; opened 19 October 1931; closed 14 June 1965;
- Llanbrynmair; opened 5 January 1863; closed 14 June 1965;
- Talerddig; opened by May 1901; closed 14 June 1965;
- Carno; opened 5 January 1863; closed 14 June 1965;
- Pontdolgoch; opened 5 January 1863; closed 14 June 1965;
- Caersws; opened 5 January 1863; still open;
- Moat Lane Junction; opened 5 January 1863; closed 31 December 1962.
