= Talerddig railway station =

Former railway station in Powys, Wales

Talerddig
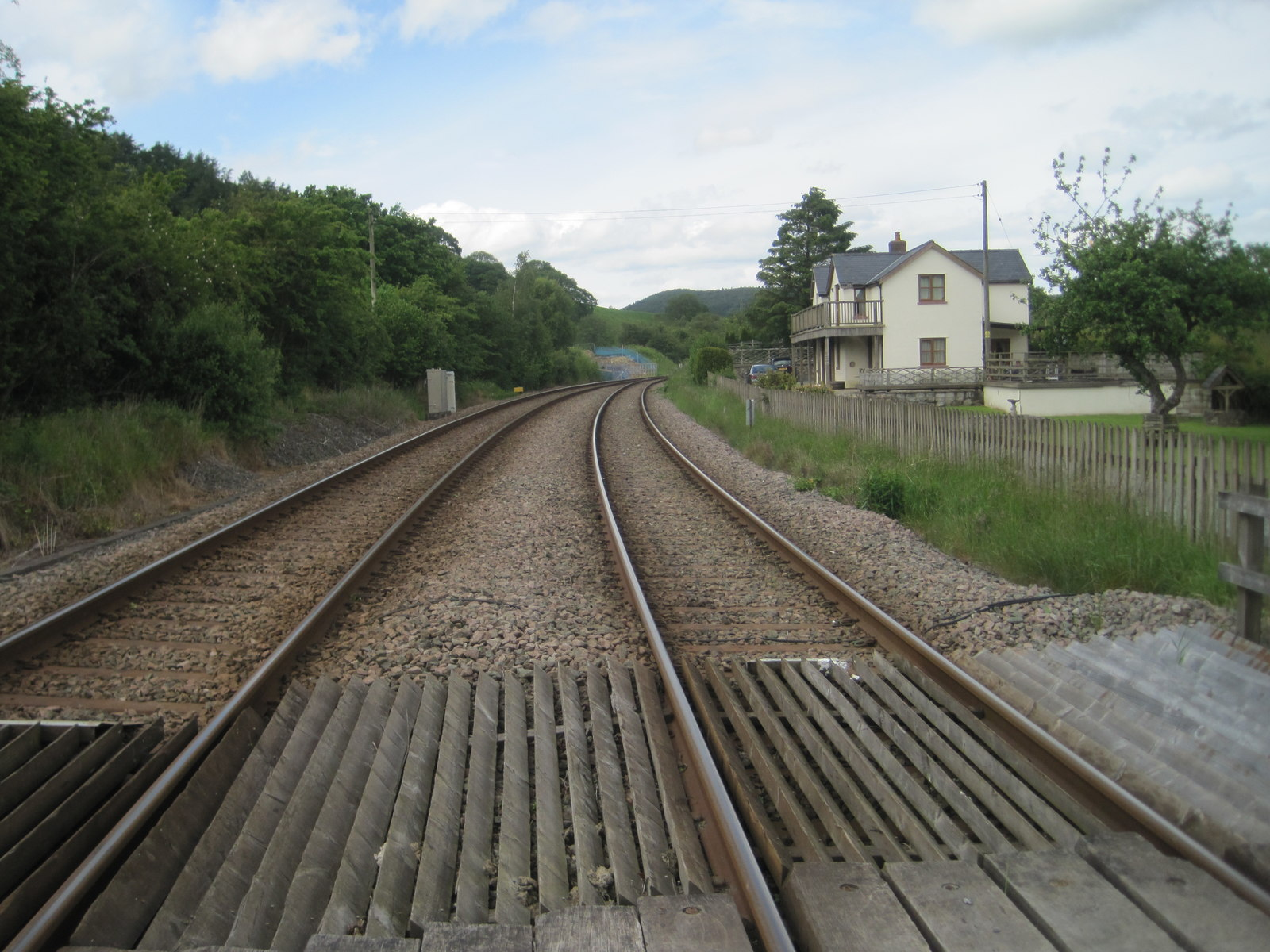
- The site of the station in 2017

General information
- Location: Talerddig, Powys; Wales
- Coordinates: 52.5815°N 3.5789°W
- Grid reference: SN930993
- Platforms: 2

Other information
- Status: Disused

History
- Original company: Cambrian Railways
- Pre-grouping: Cambrian Railways
- Post-grouping: Great Western Railway

Key dates
- 1900: Opened
- 14 June 1965: Closed
Location

Talerddig railway station was a station in Talerddig, Powys, Wales which was open from 1900 to 1965.

== History ==
The station opened in 1900 and closed on 14 June 1965, one of many on the line abandoned as a result of the Beeching Axe. The signal box predated the station, being built by McKenzie and Holland in 1874. The old Station Master's house now forms part of a private residence. The station was demolished shortly after closure. There is still a much-used passing loop on the Cambrian Line here, though this is now supervised from the signalling centre at Machynlleth and the points work automatically.

== Accidents and incidents ==
On 13 March 1894, a passenger train became divided near Talerddig Summit due to the failure of a drawbar on one of the carriages. Both parts came to a halt, but the rear section was run into by a locomotive which had been banking the train. No injuries were reported.

On 21 October 2024, two passenger trains were involved in a head-on collision at Talerddig. One person was killed and fifteen were injured.

| Preceding station | Disused railways | Following station |
|---|---|---|
| Llanbrynmair; Line open, station closed | Cambrian Railways; Newtown and Machynlleth Railway | Carno; Line open, station closed |
