= Talerddig =

Village in Powys, Wales

Coordinates: 52.588359°N 3.579007°W

- Location within Powys
- OS grid reference: SH930001
- Principal area: Powys
- Preserved county: Powys
- Country: Wales
- Sovereign state: United Kingdom
- Post town: LLANBRYNMAIR
- Postcode district: SY19
- Dialling code: 01650
- Police: Dyfed-Powys
- Fire: Mid and West Wales
- Ambulance: Welsh
- UK Parliament: Montgomeryshire and Glyndŵr
- Senedd Cymru – Welsh Parliament: Montgomeryshire

Talerddig is a village in Powys, mid Wales, located on the main A470 road between Llanbrynmair and Carno. It is part of Llanbrynmair community.

== Talerddig cutting ==
Although the village no longer has a railway station, it is on the route of the Newtown and Machynlleth Railway which opened in 1863. The line passes through Talerddig cutting, a significant civil engineering achievement of the 1860s being 120 feet (37 m) deep, the deepest in the world at the time of its completion in 1862.

There was an accident in the cutting on 18 January 1921, of which several pictures survive. There remains a passing loop today on the single track Cambrian Line where Talerddig railway station existed until 1965. The passing loop was retained in track rationalisations of the 1970s due to the need to "pin down" the brakes on freight trains over the summit, and now a critical operational node for passing passenger trains.

On 21 October 2024, two trains collided 800 metres (870 yd) west of the passing loop, killing one and injuring fifteen.

== Gallery ==
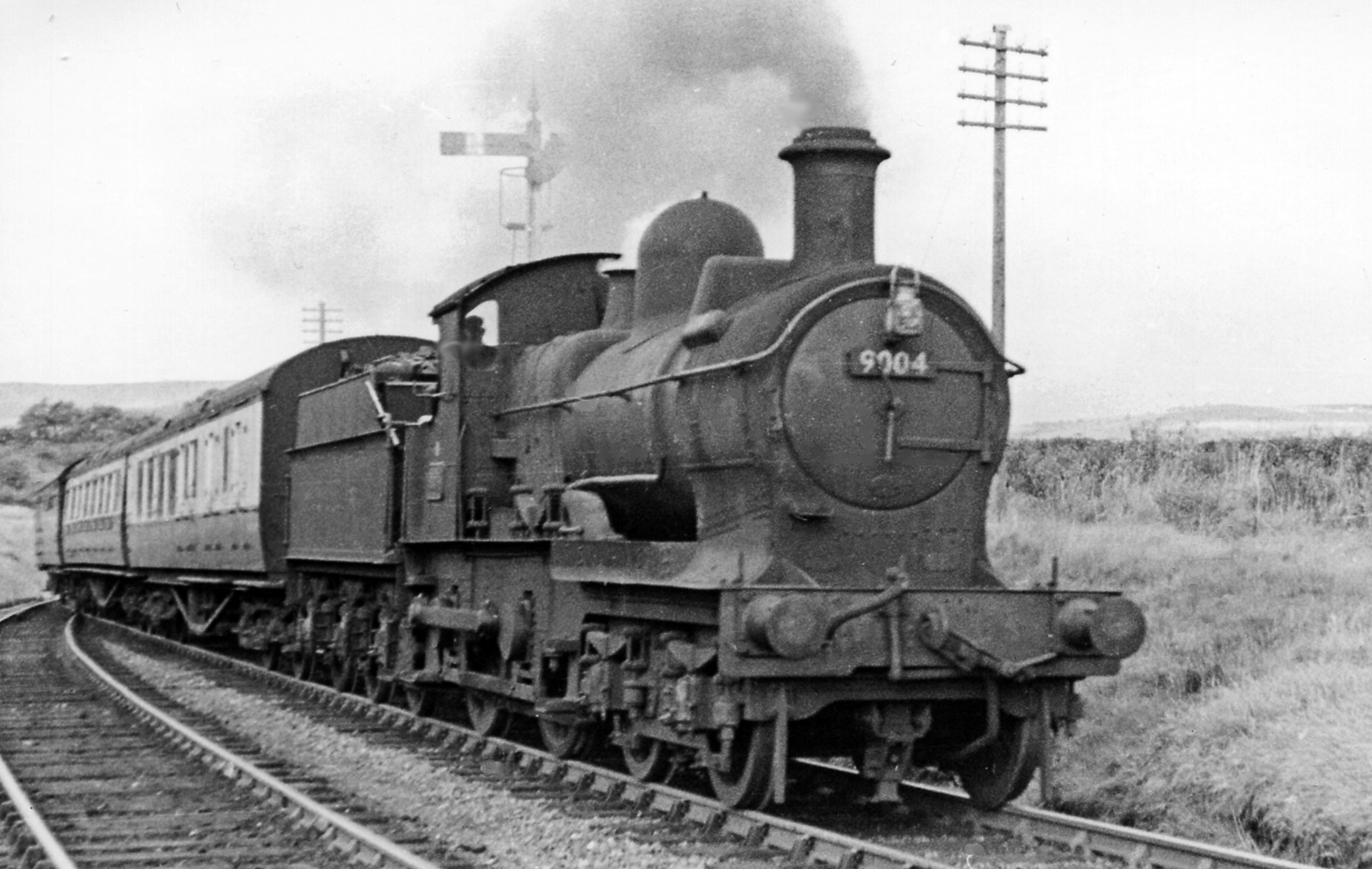
Aberystwyth - Shrewsbury train at Talerddig in 1953

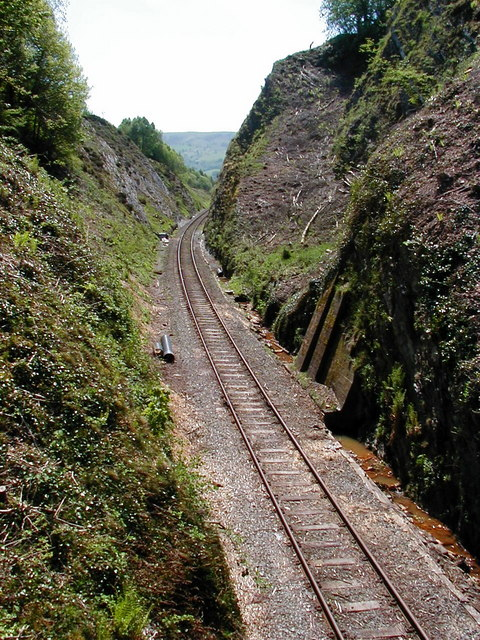
Talerddig Cutting in 2001. This was the deepest in the world at the time of its opening in the early 1860s. The original near-vertical sides have since been trimmed back

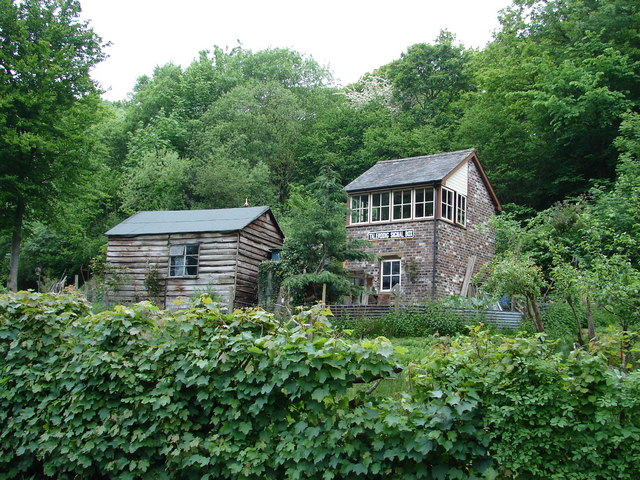
Talerddig Signal Box. The railway line lies behind the signal box
