= Llanbrynmair railway station =

Former railway station in Powys, Wales

Llanbrynmair
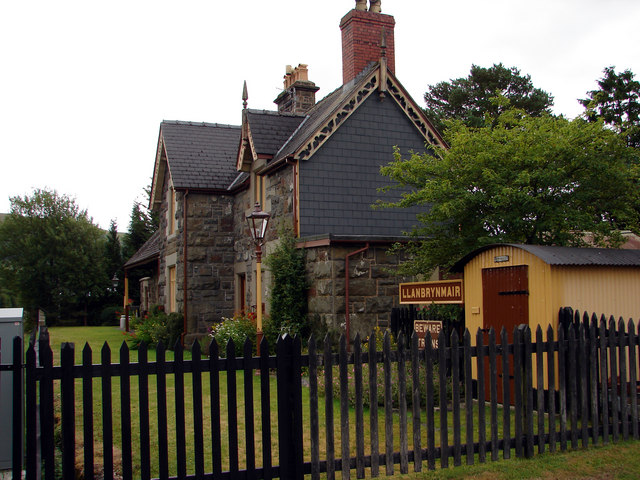
- Llanbrynmair station building, well preserved after conversion to private residential accommodation, August 2006

General information
- Location: Llanbrynmair, Powys; Wales
- Coordinates: 52.6144°N 3.6302°W
- Grid reference: SH896031
- Platforms: 2

Other information
- Status: Disused

History
- Original company: Newtown and Machynlleth Railway
- Pre-grouping: Cambrian Railways
- Post-grouping: Great Western Railway

Key dates
- 3 January 1863: Opened
- 14 June 1965: Closed

Listed Building – Grade II
- Feature: Llanbrynmair Railway Station and house
- Designated: 31 January 1997
- Reference no.: 18118
Location

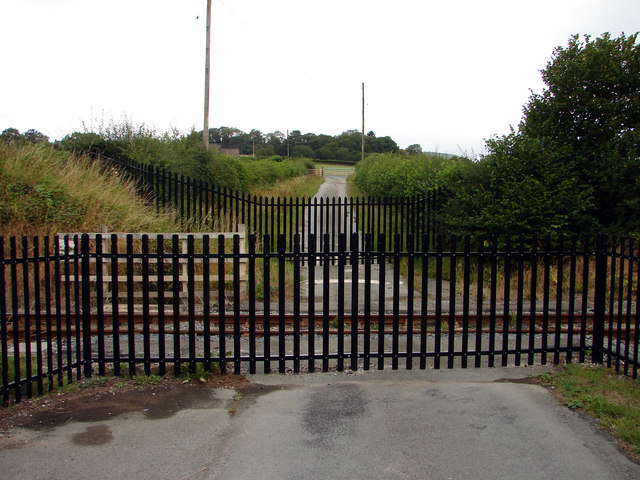
Former road crossing, now closed, at Llanbrynmair station

Llanbrynmair railway station was a railway station on the Newtown and Machynlleth Railway (N&MR) in Mid-Wales, serving the village of Llanbrynmair.

After leaving Newtown (Powys), the N&MR crossed the River Severn and passed the Cambrian Mountains through Talerddig cutting, junctioning with the Mawddwy Railway at Cemmes Road. It then proceeded to Machynlleth.

Llanbrynmair shut under the Beeching Axe in 1965, although the station building itself remains today as a private house.

After a fatality in October 1999, the adjacent level crossing was closed and the road was diverted. On 21 October 2024 two trains collided near the site of the former station, resulting in one fatality and 15 injuries.

Preceding station	Disused railways	Following station
Commins Coch Halt; Line open, station closed	Cambrian Railways; Newtown and Machynlleth Railway	Talerddig; Line open, station closed
