= Cambrian Line =

Railway line in Wales and in Shropshire, England

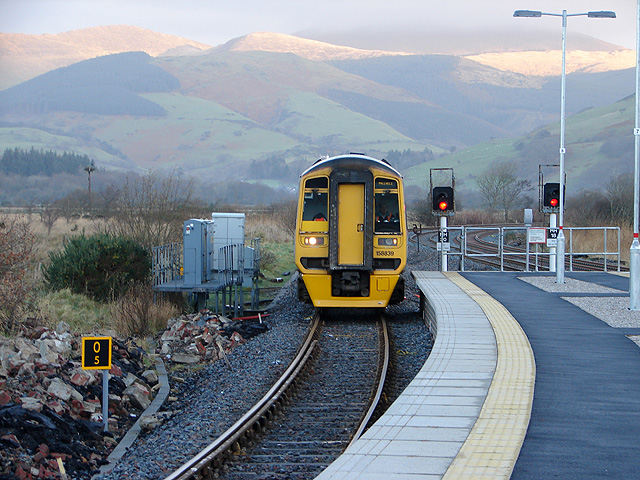
- An Arriva Trains Wales Class 158 pulls into Dovey Junction station, where the line splits to Pwllheli and Aberystwyth

Overview
- Other name(s): Cambrian Main Line (partially), Cambrian Coast Line (partially), Cambrian Railway
- Native name: Llinell y Cambrian, Prif Linell y Cambrian, Lein y Cambrian, Llinell Arfordir y Cambrian, Rheilffordd y Cambrian
- Status: Operational
- Owner: Network Rail
- Locale: England: Shropshire; Wales: Powys; Ceredigion; Gwynedd
- Termini: Shrewsbury; Pwllheli / Aberystwyth
- Stations: 34

Service
- Type: Heavy rail
- System: National Rail
- Services: Shrewsbury–Pwllheli; Shrewsbury–Aberystwyth
- Operator: Transport for Wales
- Rolling stock: Class 158 Express Sprinter; Class 197e (fitted with ECTS)

History
- Opened: 1855–1869

Technical
- Line length: Shrewsbury–Aberystwyth; 80 mi 59 ch (129.93 km); Shrewsbury–Pwllheli; 117 mi 69 ch (189.68 km)
- Number of tracks: 1 (with passing loops)
- Character: Rural
- Track gauge: 1,435 mm (4 ft 8 1/2 in) standard gauge
- Electrification: None
- Operating speed: 130 km/h (81 mph)
- Signalling: ETCS Level 2
Route map
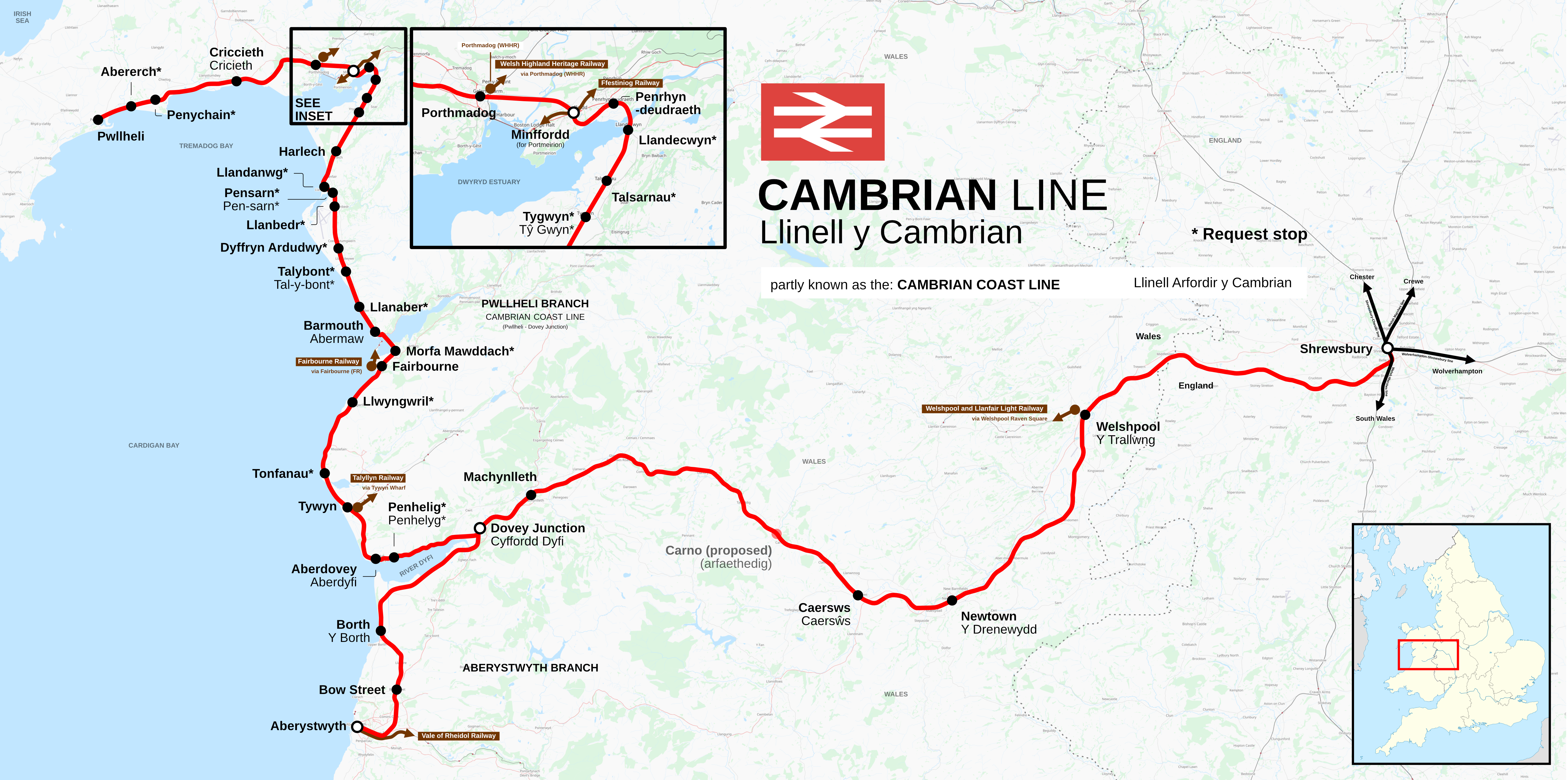
(Click to expand)

The Cambrian Line (Welsh: Llinell y Cambrian or Lein y Cambrian), sometimes split into the Cambrian Main Line (Welsh: Prif Linell y Cambrian) and Cambrian Coast Line (Welsh: Llinell Arfordir y Cambrian) for its branches, is a railway line that runs from Shrewsbury in England, westwards to Aberystwyth and Pwllheli in Wales. Passenger train services are operated by Transport for Wales between the western terminals of Pwllheli, in Gwynedd, and Aberystwyth, in Ceredigion, and the eastern terminal at Shrewsbury, Shropshire, as part of the Wales & Borders franchise.

The railway line is widely regarded as scenic, as it passes through the Cambrian Mountains in central Wales and along the coast of Cardigan Bay in Snowdonia National Park. The line includes long sections of rural single track and is designated as a community rail partnership.

== Route ==
From Shrewsbury, the line heads west through northern Powys, serving the towns of Welshpool and Newtown, then continues further west calling at Caersws and then Machynlleth until reaching Dovey Junction. At Dovey Junction, a short distance west of Machynlleth, the line splits into two branches: the southern branch goes to Aberystwyth, and the longer, northern branch continues to Pwllheli as the Cambrian Coast Line, crossing the River Mawddach by Barmouth Bridge. The section of the Cambrian Line between Shrewsbury and Aberystwyth may be called the Cambrian Main Line.

== History ==
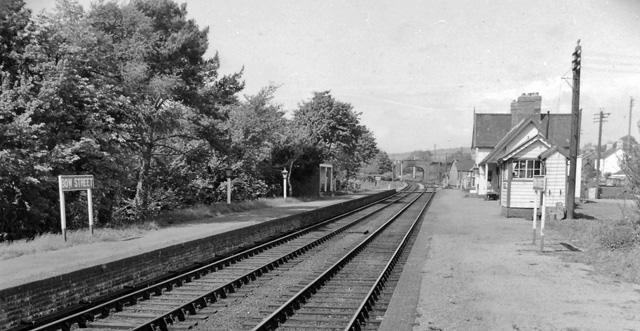
Bow Street station in 1962

The line comprises:

- Shrewsbury and Welshpool Railway between Shrewsbury and Buttington
- Oswestry and Newtown Railway between Buttington Junction and Newtown
- Llanidloes and Newtown Railway between Newtown and Moat Lane Junction
- Newtown and Machynlleth Railway between Moat Lane Junction and Machynlleth
- Aberystwith and Welsh Coast Railway between Machynlleth and Aberystwyth/Pwllheli.

These lines were constructed between 1855 and 1869. The section west of Buttington Junction became part of the Cambrian Railways in 1864.

The Cambrian Railways became part of the Great Western Railway under the Grouping Act of 1921. On nationalisation, these lines were operated first by the Western Region of British Railways and later by the London Midland Region. In a later reorganisation, passenger services were operated by the Regional Railways Central sector. Following privatisation in the mid 1990s, passenger services were first operated by Central Trains, then by Wales & Borders from 2001, Arriva Trains Wales from 2003, KeolisAmey Wales from 2018 and publicly-owned Transport for Wales from 2021.

=== Closed stations ===
Although the line survived the Beeching Axe, many stations were closed from the 1960s onwards:

Shrewsbury to Dovey Junction

- Hanwood
- Yockleton
- Westbury
- Plas-y-Court Halt
- Breidden
- Buttington (connection with the Cambrian Railways line to Oswestry)
- Forden
- Montgomery
- Abermule
- Scafell Halt
- Moat Lane Junction (connection with Mid Wales Railway to Brecon)
- Pontdolgoch
- Carno (reopening proposed, application at final stage)
- Talerddig
- Llanbrynmair
- Commins Coch Halt
- Cemmes Road (connection with Mawddwy Railway to Dinas Mawddwy)

Dovey Junction to Aberystwyth

- Glandyfi
- Ynyslas
- Llandre
- Bow Street (reopened in 2021)

Dovey Junction to Pwllheli

- Gogarth
- Abertafol
- Llangelynin
- Black Rock Halt
- Afon Wen (connection with the Carnarvonshire Railway to Carnarvon)
- The Ruabon bound platforms at Barmouth Junction were also closed in 1965 and the station renamed Morfa Mawddach.

== Politics ==
The Cambrian line was not directly threatened with closure in the 1963 Beeching Report. Later threats to the coastal part of the route, from Dovey Junction to Pwllheli, were subsequently withdrawn. Its tourism role is as a scenic route, as well as linking many coastal resorts and connecting to five narrow-gauge tourist lines (these are the Talyllyn Railway, Welshpool and Llanfair Railway, Ffestiniog Railway, Welsh Highland Railway and the Vale of Rheidol Railway).

== Performance ==
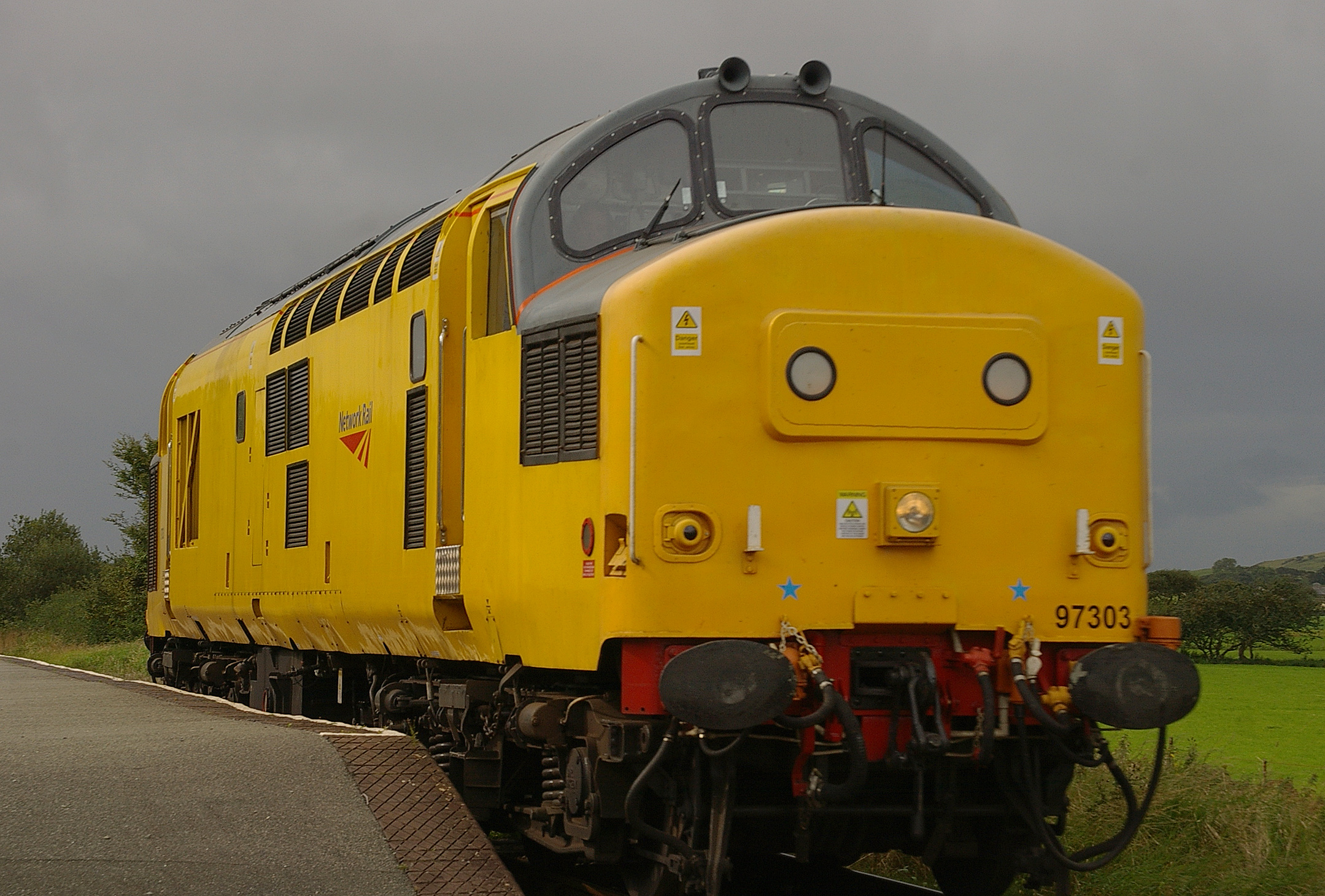
A Network Rail Class 97 locomotive at Talsarnau railway station, 2009

With long sections of single line and limited passing points, minor disruptions on the Cambrian Line quickly lead to compound delays and partial cancellations. This, combined with short turnaround times at each end of the route, led to severe unpunctuality during much of the first decade of the 21st century. The extension of the service to Birmingham International in late 2008 has helped address this by eliminating the tight turnarounds at the heavily congested Birmingham New Street station. Maintenance changes and additional padding in public timetables has also helped improve performance figures overall.

In Arriva Trains Wales' performance statistics, the Cambrian Line was routinely the worst-performing service group between 2003 and 2008. Since early 2009, recorded timekeeping has improved – a considerable achievement, considering that the route has been the testing ground for brand new signalling technology previously unused on the British railway network.

Cambrian Line performance comparison
Service Group	Punctuality for the 12 months to	
Service Group	13 October 2007	6 December 2014
Cambrian	88.2%	94.3%
Marches	93.7%	92.7%
Wales–England	95.8%	97.7%
South, West, Central Wales	94.0%	96.0%
Valley Lines	95.1%	95.5%
North Wales Inter Urban	97.7%	96.5%
North Wales Rural	92.3%	93.4%

== Line upgrade ==
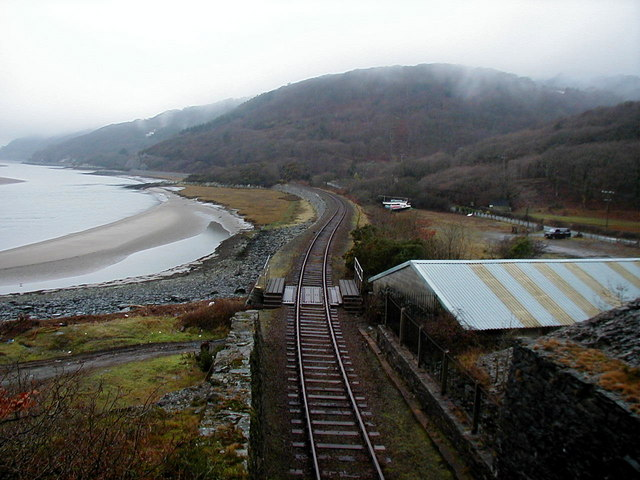
A single-track stretch on the Cambrian Coast Line

In October 2006, it was announced that Network Rail would pilot the European Rail Traffic Management System on the Cambrian Line. The ERTMS allows headways between trains using the same track to be reduced without affecting safety, allowing a more frequent service. Should the pilot scheme be successful, the system is expected to be rolled out on some other rural routes within the UK.

The upgrade was expected to cost £59 million and was to be completed by December 2008, but the system was only released for limited testing, between Pwllheli and Harlech, in February 2010. Three signallers from the Machynlleth signalling centre and seven drivers were trained to operate the new equipment. Ansaldo STS were the principal contractors for the upgrade, with Thales as sub-contractors for the Telecomms and Eldin as installation subcontractors for all elements of UK infrastructure. Systra was in charge of testing and commissioning the ETCS and interlocking components of the signalling system.

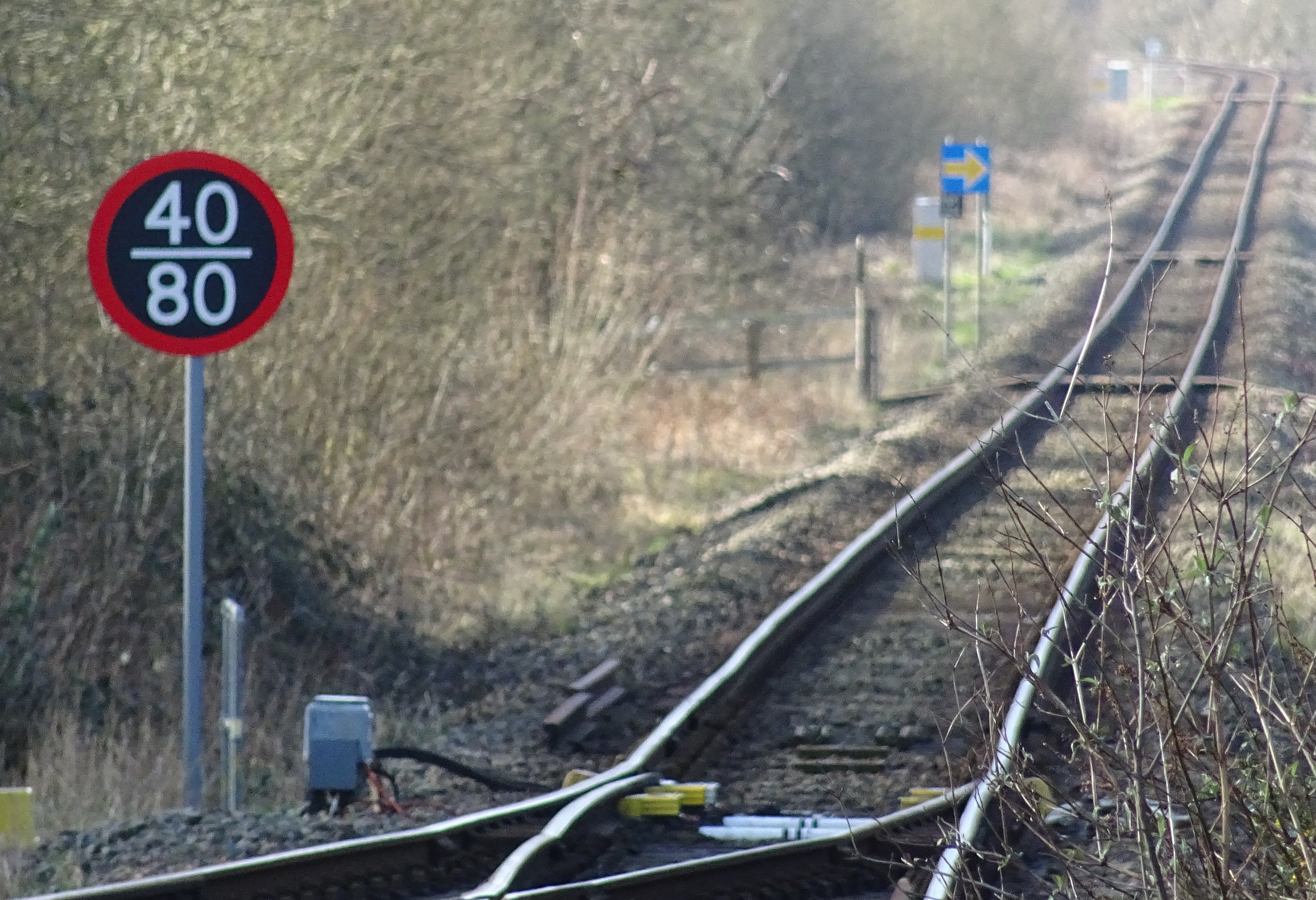
An example of a metric speed limit sign, west of Machynlleth, installed as part of the ERTMS upgrade. It shows a differential limit with different speeds for freight and passenger trains

Ansaldo installed ERTMS In Cab ETCS (European Train Control System) level 2, class 1, specification V2.3.0 in 2011 (as noted below). As the name suggests, the driver receives the instructions for movement on the cab display. This level does not require conventional fixed signals – therefore all the existing signals and RETB boards have been removed. Additionally, the line side speed signs were made redundant – drivers are given the appropriate maximum speed on the cab display (in kilometres per hour).

The Cambrian ERTMS, Pwllheli to Harlech rehearsal, started on 13 February 2010 and completed successfully on 18 February 2010. The driver familiarisation and practical handling stage of the rehearsal provided an excellent opportunity to monitor the use of GSM-R voice in operation on this route. The first train departed Pwllheli at 08:53 in ERTMS Level 2 Operation with GSM-R voice being used as the only means of communication between the driver and the signaller.

Network Rail spokeswoman Mavis Choong was unable to give a figure for how much the scheme has cost, but said £400m was being spent installing it across the UK network. She claimed the 14-month delay was caused by the system "being new".

In 2007, a new flat crossing, named "Cae Pawb Crossing", was installed at the intersection of the Cambrian Line and the Welsh Highland Railway.

In October 2010, following completion of testing, the ERTMS system finally entered service between Pwllheli and Harlech and the previous Radio Electronic Token Block system was removed. On 18 March 2011, the final commissioning phase for the ERTMS system across the whole Cambrian route started, including layout alterations at Welshpool and Talerddig which would facilitate a desired increase in service frequency. At 07:20 on 26 March 2011, the New ERTMS signalling system was placed into operational use across the Cambrian Line controlled from Machynlleth, some 40 minutes ahead of the planned schedule. Two days of driver familiarisation then followed; passenger operation started on 28 March 2011. An initial assessment by the operating company was not favourable: problems with the design and installation of the in-cab displays were identified and infrastructure failures included the control system becoming "confused" by common train movements, such as changes of speed or shunting into the depot.

=== 2018 track upgrades ===
In 2018, Network Rail began upgrading 3.7 miles (6.0 km) of track at a cost of £7.5 million. As well as improving reliability by replacing track, Network Rail and Powys County Council installed over a mile of new road and two road over rail bridges at Ystrad Fawr and Rallt. This has closed eight level crossings and improved safety for local residents.

=== ETCS upgrade announcement 2020 ===
The UK Government's Transport Secretary Grant Shapps announced on 21 August 2020 that £3m in funding had been authorised to advance plans to upgrade signalling on the 241 km (150 mi) Cambrian line from Shrewsbury Sutton Bridge Junction to Aberystwyth and Pwllheli. "The planned state-of-the-art digital signalling system will modernise the network, improving reliability of services, and supporting the introduction of a new fleet being rolled out across the network in December 2022", the minister said.

This improvement enabled the planned upgrade to Class 197s on the Cambrian Line in September 2026.

== Accidents and incidents ==
=== Abermule 1921 ===
The worst accident on the Cambrian Line – and the worst on the former Cambrian Railways system – occurred on 26 January 1921 on the single-tracked line between Abermule and Newtown. A westbound stopping train from Whitchurch set off from Abermule without the correct authority, and collided head-on with an eastbound express from Aberystwyth. Seventeen people were killed, including the driver and fireman of the stopping train.

=== 2009 level crossing incident ===
On 2 September 2009, a Class 97/3 locomotive, operated by Network Rail, collided with a Fiat Punto on a user worked crossing near Penrhyndeudraeth. The driver of the car, an 83-year-old local resident, was killed in the collision. Prior to her death, the victim had been a regular user of the level crossing for more than 40 years, and relied on her knowledge of passenger train timetables to determine when it was safe to cross. On the day of the collision, she had not used the telephone prior to crossing.

=== Llanbadarn level-crossing incident ===
Shortly before 22:00 on Sunday 19 June 2011, a passenger train from Aberystwyth to Machynlleth ran onto the level crossing at Llanbadarn while the barriers at the crossing were raised, and came to a stop with the front of the train about 31 metres (102 ft) beyond the crossing. There were no road vehicles or pedestrians on the crossing at the time. The immediate cause of the incident was that the train driver did not notice that the indicator close to the crossing was flashing red until it was too late for him to stop the train before it reached the crossing. Factors behind this included the driver's "workload" (his need to observe a screen in the cab at the same time as he should also be observing a lineside indicator), the design of the equipment associated with the operation of the level crossing, and the re-setting of the signalling system on board the train before it could depart from Aberystwyth. An underlying cause of the incident was that the signalling system now in use on the lines from Shrewsbury to Aberystwyth and Pwllheli did not interface with the automatic level crossings on these routes.

The RAIB made six recommendations: three directed to Network Rail, two to Arriva Trains Wales and one to the Rail Safety and Standards Board (RSSB). These cover the development of engineering solutions to mitigate the risk of trains passing over automatic crossings which have not operated correctly; changes to the operating equipment of Llanbadarn crossing; the processes used by railway operators to request permission to deviate from published standards; the operational requirements of drivers as trains depart from Aberystwyth; and the way in which drivers interact with the information screens of the cab signalling used on the Cambrian lines. The failure at ERTMS System-User Interface investigated by the RAIB indicates that the ERTMS Implementation did not satisfy the non-functional attribute of safety integrity of the real time dependable distributed computing concepts.

=== 2024 Talerddig Incident ===
At 19:30 on 21 October 2024, the Shrewsbury to Aberystwyth service and the Machynlleth to Shrewsbury services collided outside of the village of Llanbrynmair, Powys. The incident resulted in one death and fifteen injuries. Initial inspections by the RAIB found evidence of low rail head adhesion.

== Services ==
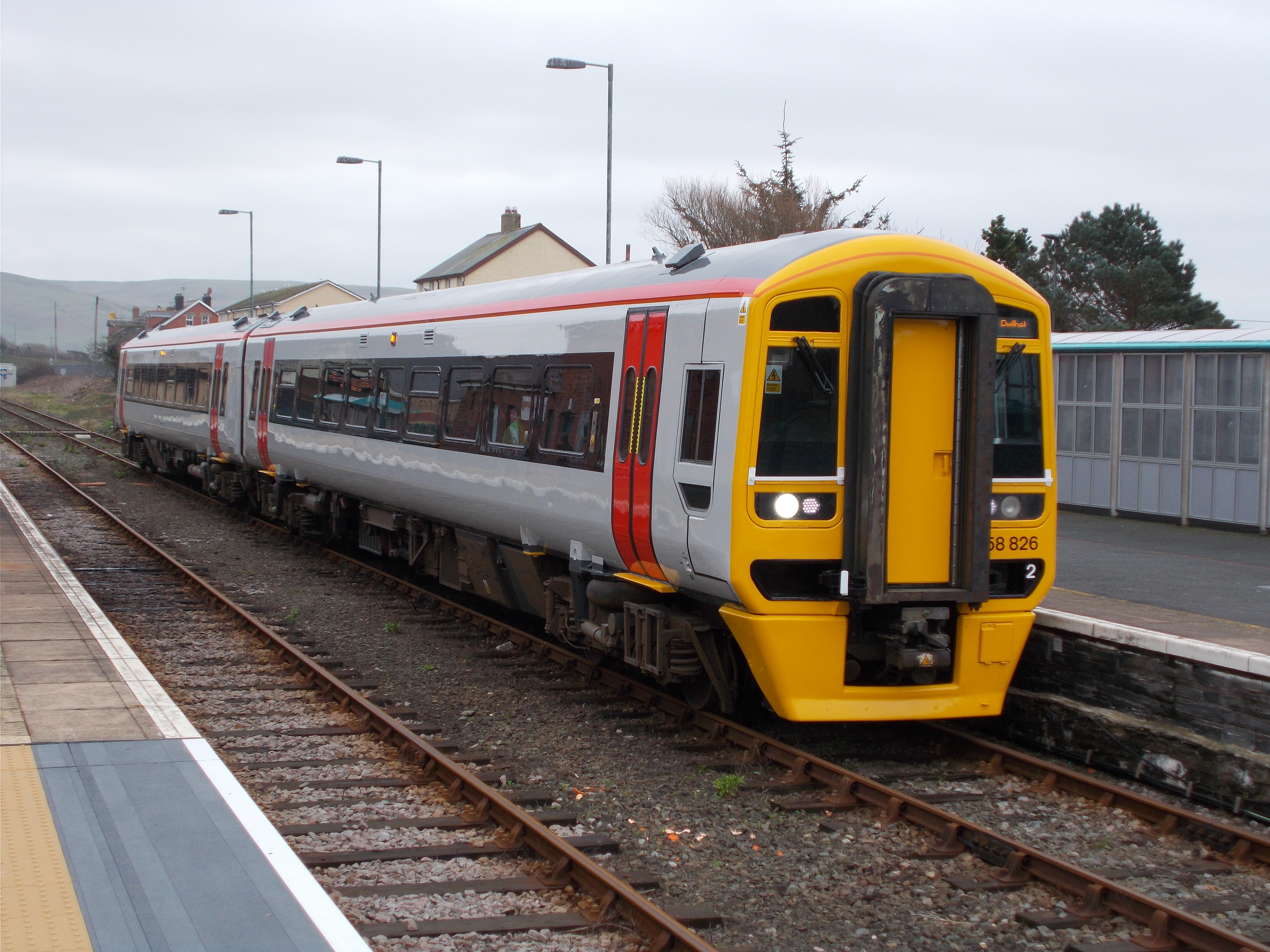
Freshly painted and without branding, Transport for Wales Class 158 at Tywyn station, making the 11:30 service to Pwllheli on 21 February 2019

As of October 2026, the Aberystwyth line is served by twelve direct trains each way between Aberystwyth and Shrewsbury on weekdays and Saturdays, and eleven on Sundays, with eight trains in each direction on weekdays continuing to or from Birmingham. The service is close to hourly but includes several two-hour gaps. An hourly all-stations service, first announced in 2014, was planned by Transport for Wales (TfW) to run between March and September from 2026.

Services to Pwllheli run approximately every two hours, either as separate connecting services to and from Machynlleth or as portions of Aberystwyth services that divide and join there. From 19 October 2026, several new Class 197e units were introduced into traffic between Pwllheli and Machynlleth. Accordingly, a temporary timetable was introduced, as the 197s cannot couple and continue east with the Class 158 units they are replacing. All Pwllheli services start and terminate at Machynlleth, and passengers to and from Shrewsbury and Birmingham change trains there. TfW expects the arrangement to continue until late 2026.

The line was resignalled with ERTMS, which entered operational use in March 2011 as part of infrastructure upgrades intended to allow an hourly service. Four additional daily return services between Aberystwyth and Shrewsbury, funded by the Welsh Government, began on 17 May 2015, giving an hourly service during the morning and evening peaks. Before then, trains ran approximately every two hours between Aberystwyth and Birmingham. In December 2019, Sunday services between Aberystwyth and Shrewsbury increased from eight to eleven in each direction.

Through trains continue beyond Birmingham New Street to Birmingham International. Until December 2022, Transport for Wales trains on the route called at Smethwick Galton Bridge, where passengers could connect to other services. They now call at Sandwell & Dudley instead.

Existing Class 158 (right) and a pair of Class 197e trains working in multiple (left), on testing. (8 August 2024)

Freight services over the line were absent for many years; the last scheduled freight ran in 1993. A timber trial in 2005 carried timber from Aberystwyth to the Kronospan factory at Chirk using the two halves of a MPV pair sandwiched around seven open-sided timber wagons. Freight returned in April 2022, when Colas Rail ran a trial train of ten timber wagons from Aberystwyth to Chirk. A permanent contract followed in August 2022 for a weekly train of about 700 tonnes, and by the summer and autumn of 2023 the service ran up to three times a week. The trains are operated by Colas Rail but hauled by Class 97 locomotives belonging to Network Rail, owing to the need for trains on the route to be compatible with the ETCS signalling used on the line; a Class 97 leading a Class 37 is also used. In late 2023, RSPB Cymru raised concerns that the trains disturbed Greenland white-fronted geese on the Dyfi Estuary, and Natural Resources Wales and Network Rail entered discussions on the matter.

== Steam workings ==
In 2007, West Coast Railways took over operation of the Cambrian Coast Express which ran over the Cambrian Coast Line from Machynlleth to Porthmadog and Pwllheli, the train was also renamed to The Cambrian. The service would run from the last week of July until the end of August between 2007 and 2010.

Before the 2011 season, WCR issued a statement stating that due to Network Rail's implementation of the new European Rail Traffic Management System (ERTMS) signalling on the Cambrian Coast, which necessitated new in-cab signalling equipment, the seasonal steam services had to cease running because no system was yet available for fitment in steam locomotives. No steam loco owners were planning to upgrade their locos to work under the system in the then-near future, owing to costs and the amount of equipment that was required. Locos that have visited the route over the years include: 7802 Bradley Manor, 7819 Hinton Manor, 44871, 46443, 75069 & 76079.

Following an absence of 14 years, it was announced, in February 2024, that as part of trials for the fitment of the new ETCS signalling system to steam locomotives, 60163 Tornado is to run overnight testing trains between Shrewsbury and Newtown. The trains will be run during night-time to avoid affecting passenger services. These trials are also being undertaken as part of Network Rail's East Coast Digital Programme & Pathfinder Project.

== Coast Line infrastructure problems ==
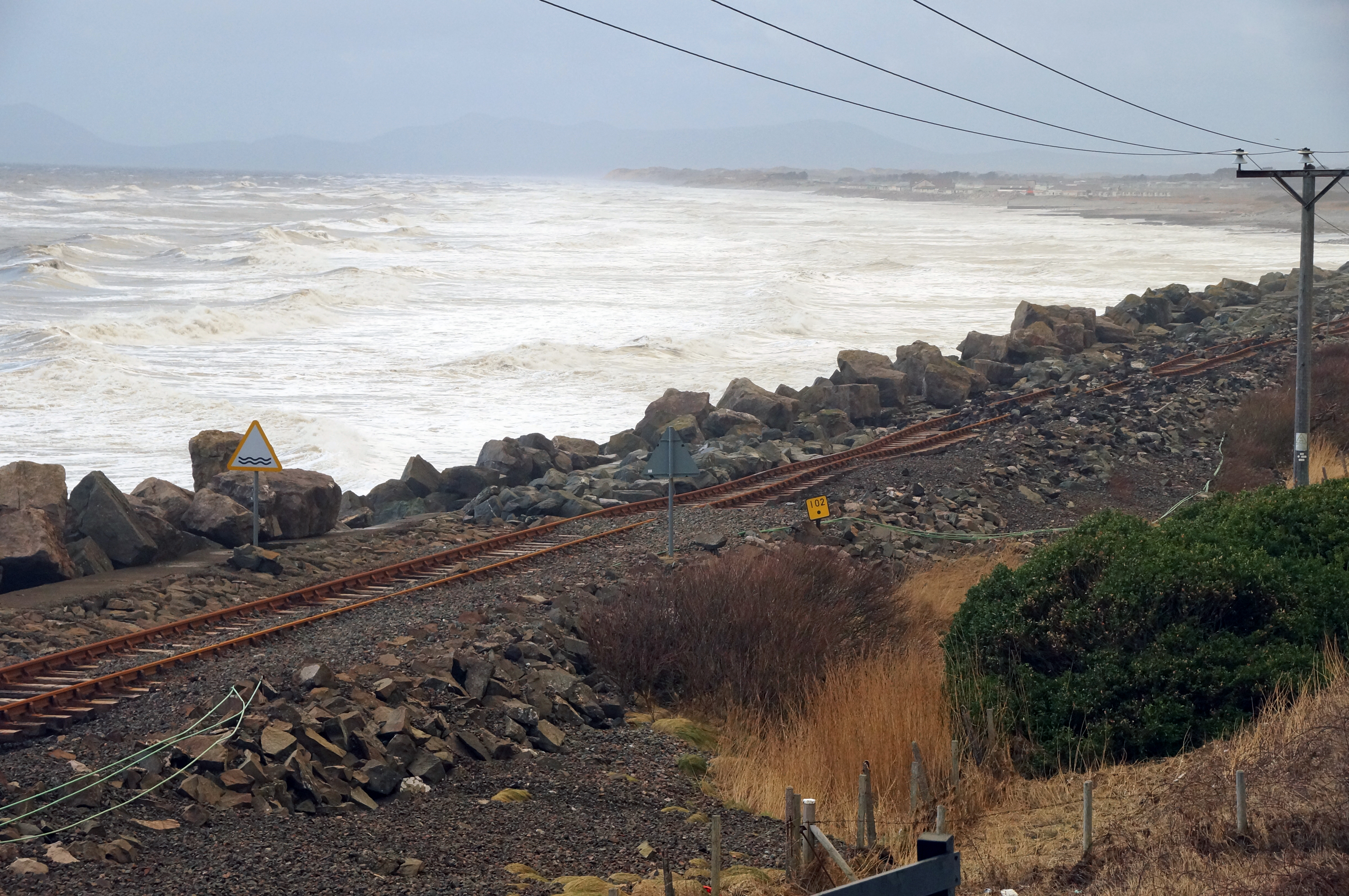
Wave damage caused at Llanaber, 3 January 2014

Major structural problems with Barmouth Bridge resulted in the withdrawal of services between 1980 and 1986 and the line was threatened with closure before ultimately being repaired and reopened.

Work began in March 2013 to replace the wooden Pont Briwet viaduct over the Afon Dwyryd near Llandecwyn. The new bridge now carries two lanes of road traffic and the single track railway, and opened in 2015. It was hoped that, apart from a four-week period where power cables had to be moved, the old viaduct could remain open throughout the works. However, the bridge was found to have been affected by the piling work for the new bridge, and was declared structurally unsafe and closed in December 2013. This necessitated a diversion via Maentwrog for road users and caused rail services to terminate at Harlech. A new temporary bridge was due to open in Spring 2014, but this plan had been scrapped in favour of running a convoy system on the A496 road that served as the diversionary route. Work then focused on completing the main railway and road bridge by the end of the year.

In January 2014, the Coast line from Dovey Junction was closed to all trains after two sections of track between Tywyn and Barmouth were severely damaged by storm-force winds and tidal surges at the beginning of the month. Part of the sea wall protecting the trackbed at Llanaber near Barmouth was washed away, resulting in some 300 tons of ballast being lost and the formation covered in debris, whilst further south a section of embankment at Tonfanau was washed out. Two of Arriva Trains Wales's Class 158 trains were trapped at Barmouth, and were removed by road. Network Rail described the damage suffered by the line as "devastating", but stated the line to Barmouth could be reopened by 10 February 2014, which it was. Repairs north of Barmouth were completed, and the line reopened to Harlech on 1 May 2014, two weeks ahead of schedule. The full line reopened on 1 September 2014.

== See also ==
- Rail transport in Shropshire
- Heart of Wales Line
- Map of places on 'Cambrian Line' compiled from this article
