= Newtown railway station (Wales) =

Railway station in Powys, Wales

Newtown Welsh: Y Drenewydd
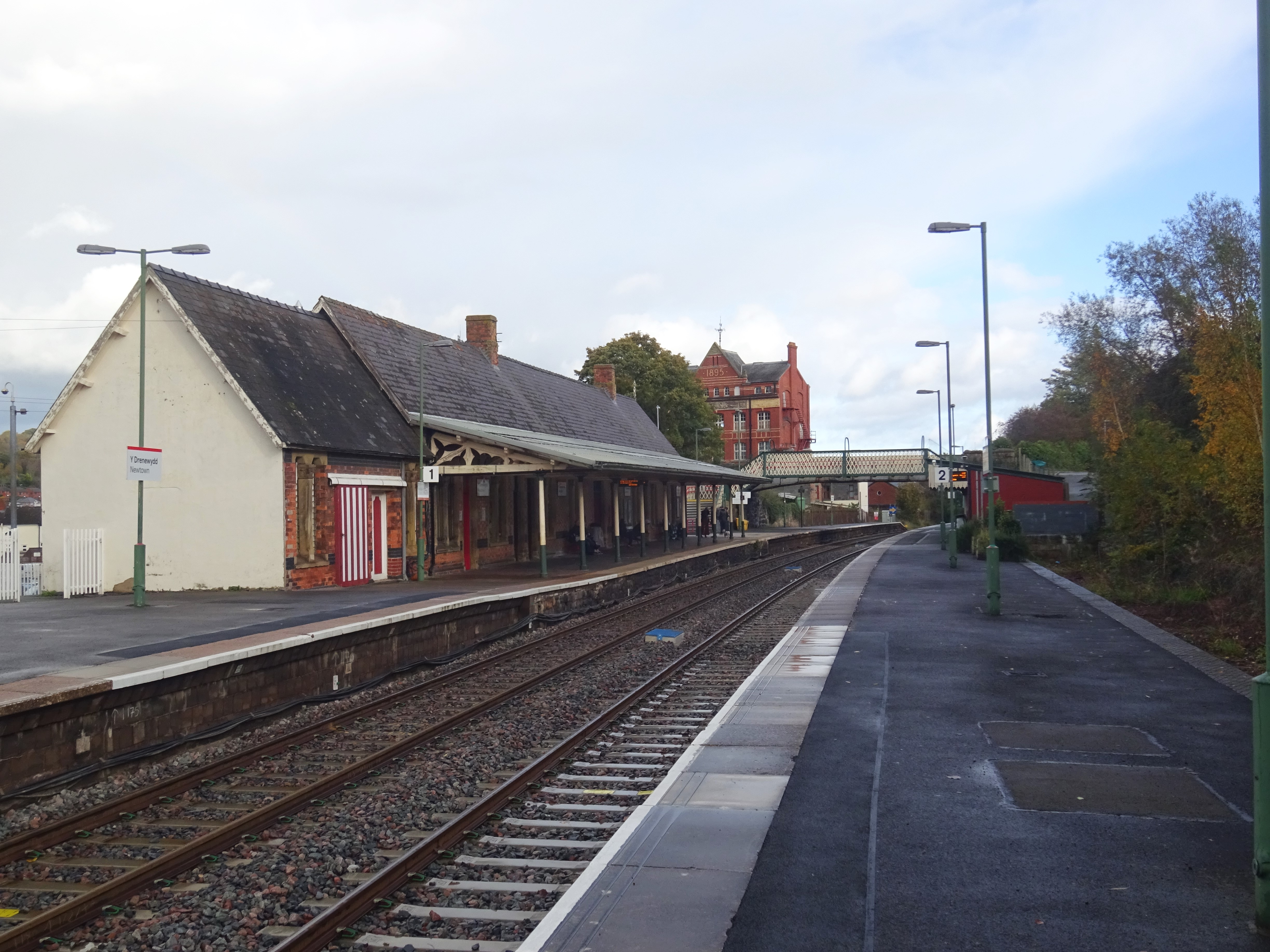

General information
- Location: Newtown, Powys; Wales
- Coordinates: 52°30′44″N 3°18′43″W
- Grid reference: SO111913
- Manager: Transport for Wales
- Platforms: 2

Other information
- Station code: NWT
- Classification: DfT category E

History
- Original company: Oswestry and Newtown Railway
- Pre-grouping: Cambrian Railways
- Post-grouping: Great Western Railway

Passengers
- 2020/21: ▼22,420
- 2021/22: ▲87,598
- 2022/23: ▲0.124 million
- 2023/24: ▲0.140 million
- 2024/25: ▲0.171 million

Listed Building – Grade II
- Feature: Railway Station
- Designated: 9 May 1988
- Reference no.: 8112
Location
Notes
- Passenger statistics from the Office of Rail and Road

Newtown railway station (Welsh: Y Drenewydd) is a railway station serving Newtown, Powys, Wales. It is on the Cambrian Line, between Shrewsbury and Caersws, 33 miles 70 chains (54.5 km) from Whitchurch (measured via Oswestry). Transport for Wales Rail manage the station and operate all services.

== History ==
The station was opened on 11 August 1859. It was resited slightly to the east in June 1861.

It was also originally served by the (now mostly defunct) Llanidloes and Newtown Railway (opened in 1859 and initially isolated from the rest of the Welsh railway system) and the Oswestry and Newtown Railway (opened in 1861). All were subsequently subsumed into the Cambrian by 1865. The station was the eastern terminus of the Newtown and Machynlleth Railway opened by the Countess of Londonderry at Machynlleth station on 3 January 1863.

The Mid-Wales line passenger service was withdrawn on 31 December 1962, though trains to and from this route latterly started and terminated at Moat Lane Junction. Services to Oswestry and Whitchurch via the former O&NR Cambrian main line ended in January 1965, when the route east of Buttington closed to passenger traffic as a consequence of the Beeching cuts.

== Facilities ==
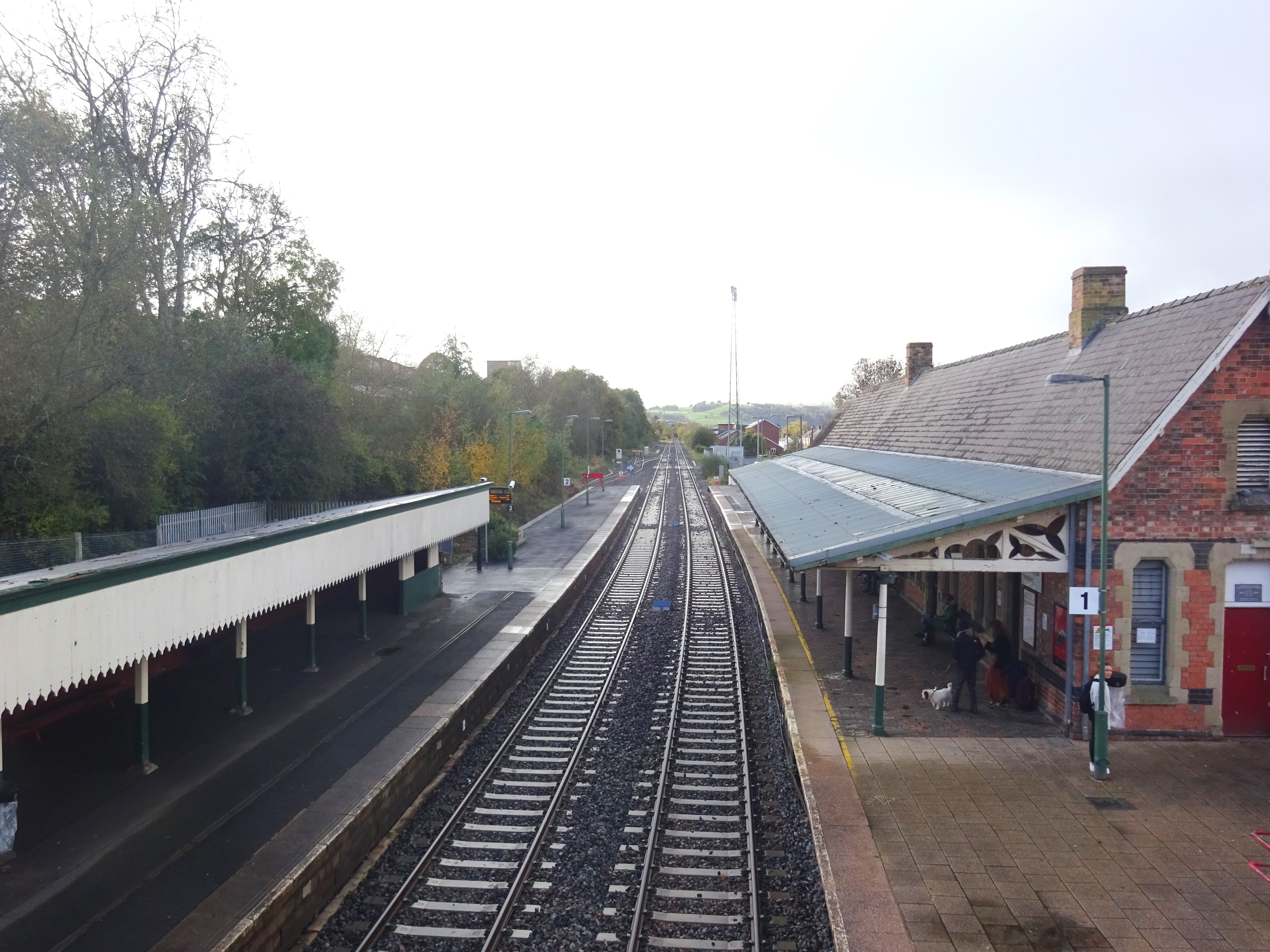
Station buildings in November 2023

The station currently has two through platforms, which are used separately for trains in either direction. The station is usually used as one of the passing points for trains on the Cambrian Line as it is a single track.

There is a ticket office in the main building. It also has a computer training centre. This replaced the ticket office previously operated independently, which closed in 2020. Train running information is provided by digital CIS displays, automatic announcements and customer help points on both platforms. Step-free access is available on both platforms, but the ramp to access Platform 2 is not suitable for wheelchair or mobility scooter users. Artwork on the platform is created by local young people.

From December 2023, construction on a new accessible footbridge with lifts began, with it hoped to be completed by the end of 2024. Undertaken by Network Rail, the construction utilises funding from the Department for Transport's "Access for All" programme.

== Passenger volume ==
Passenger volume at Newtown
	2004–05	2005–06	2006–07	2007–08	2008–09	2009–10	2010–11	2011–12	2012–13	2013–14	2014–15	2015–16	2016–17	2017–18	2018–19	2019–20	2020–21	2021–22	2022–23	2023–24	2024–25
Entries and exits	91,883	90,836	96,464	105,260	110,034	114,310	119,194	126,110	123,578	123,918	130,306	147,938	161,722	185,064	175,336	151,570	22,420	87,598	124,412	140,288	171,366

The statistics cover twelve month periods that start in April.

== Services ==
Trains run from here westwards to Machynlleth and then either Aberystwyth or Pwllheli via Barmouth (most trains convey a portion for both routes) and eastwards to Shrewsbury and Birmingham International. There is a basic two-hourly service each way – on weekdays and Saturdays there are also some additional Shrewsbury to Aberystwyth services during the mornings and evenings. On Sundays there is a two-hourly service on the Shrewsbury – Aberystwyth axis, but only a limited service along the coast to/from Pwllheli (three in summer and one in winter).

Preceding station	National Rail	Following station
Caersws	Transport for Wales Cambrian Line	Welshpool
	Historical railways	
Scafell Halt; Line open, station closed	Cambrian Railways; Llanidloes and Newtown Railway; Oswestry and Newtown Railway	Abermule; Line open, station closed

== Bibliography ==
- Marshall, Geoff; Pipe, Vicki (2018). The Railway Adventures: Places, Trains, People and Stations. September Publishing. ISBN 978-1910463871.
- Mitchell, Vic; Smith, Keith (2007). Brecon to Newtown. West Sussex: Middleton Press. figs. 116–120. ISBN 9781906008062. OCLC 288983659.
- Mitchell, Vic; Smith, Keith (2008). Shrewsbury to Newtown. West Sussex: Middleton Press. pp. 113–120. ISBN 9781906008291. OCLC 228374968.
- Quick, Michael (2023). Railway Passenger Stations in Great Britain: A Chronology (PDF) (5th ed.). London: Railway and Canal Historical Society.
