= River Carno =

Coordinates: 52.5588°N 3.5312°W

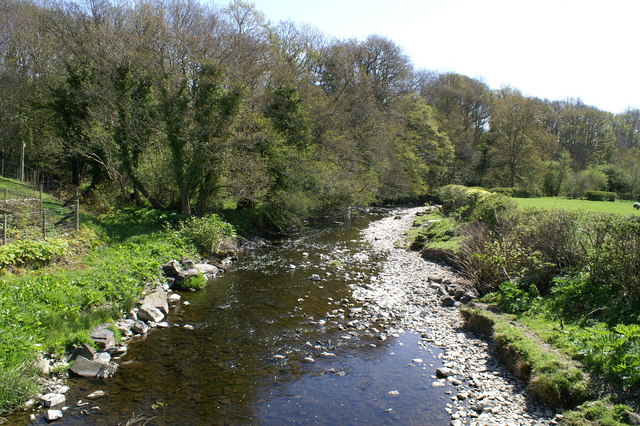
- River Carno at Pandy near Llanbrynmair, Powys, Mid Wales
- Native name: Afon Carno (Welsh)

Location
- Country: Wales
- Principal area: Powys

Physical characteristics
- Mouth
  - location: River Severn, Caersws

The River Carno (Welsh: Afon Carno) is a river in Powys, mid Wales, and a tributary of the River Severn.

The river is named after the village of Carno, which is close to the source in the foothills of the Cambrian Mountains. From Carno, it flows roughly parallel to the A470 road, past Clatter and through Pontdolgoch, before emptying into the Severn at Caersws.
