= Scafell Halt railway station =

Former railway station in Powys, Wales

Scafell Halt

General information
- Location: Newtown, Powys; Wales
- Coordinates: 52.5060°N 3.3539°W
- Grid reference: SO082906
- Platforms: 1

Other information
- Status: Disused

History
- Original company: Oswestry and Newtown Railway
- Pre-grouping: Cambrian Railways
- Post-grouping: Great Western Railway

Key dates
- 1863: Opened
- July 1891: Closed
- 9 June 1913: Reopened
- 1952: Closed to passengers
- 1955: Officially closed
Location

Scafell Halt was a railway station on the Cambrian Line, located to the west of Newtown, Powys, Wales; it was adjacent to Scafell Bridge on the River Severn. The station was opened in 1863 and closed in July 1891, before reopening on 9 June 1913; it closed finally to passengers in 1952 and closed completely in 1955. The station building was later converted to a private house.

Preceding station	Historical railways	Following station
Moat Lane Junction; Line open, station closed	Cambrian Railways; Llanidloes and Newtown Railway	Newtown (Powys); Line and station open
