= Pontdolgoch railway station =

Former railway station in Powys, Wales

Pontdolgoch
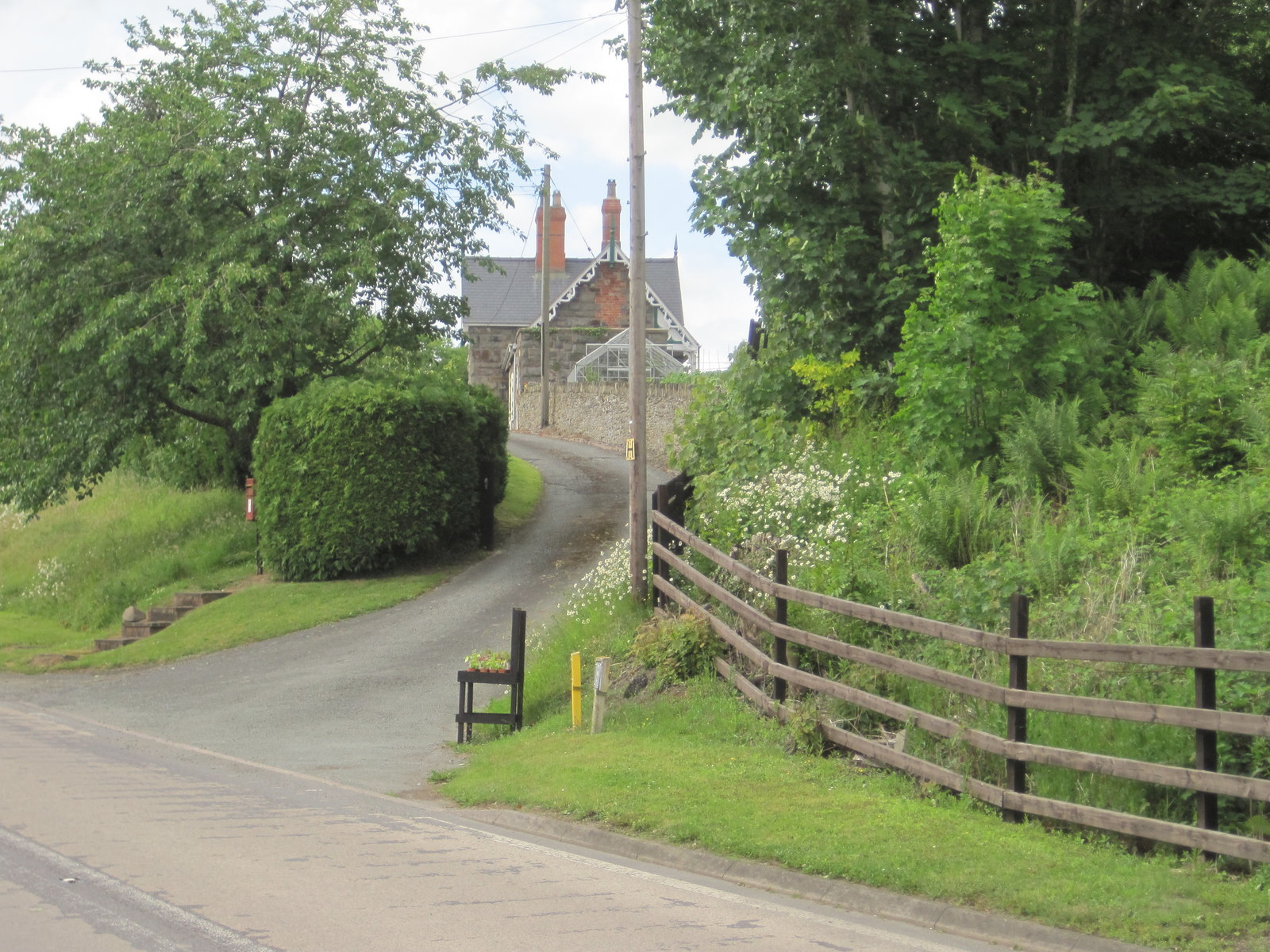

General information
- Location: Pontdolgoch, Powys; Wales
- Coordinates: 52.5330°N 3.4610°W
- Grid reference: SO009938
- Platforms: 1

Other information
- Status: Disused

History
- Original company: Newtown and Machynlleth Railway
- Pre-grouping: Cambrian Railways
- Post-grouping: Great Western Railway

Key dates
- 3 January 1863: Opened
- 14 June 1965: Closed

Listed Building – Grade II
- Feature: Pont-dol-goch Railway Station and Stationmaster’s house
- Designated: 5 November 1996
- Reference no.: 17557
Location

Pontdolgoch railway station was a station in Pontdolgoch, Powys, Wales. The station opened on 3 January 1863 and closed on 14 June 1965.

| Preceding station | Historical railways | Following station |
|---|---|---|
| Carno; Line open, station closed | Cambrian Railways; Newtown and Machynlleth Railway | Caersws; Line and station open |
