= Caersws railway station =

Railway station in Powys, Wales

Caersws
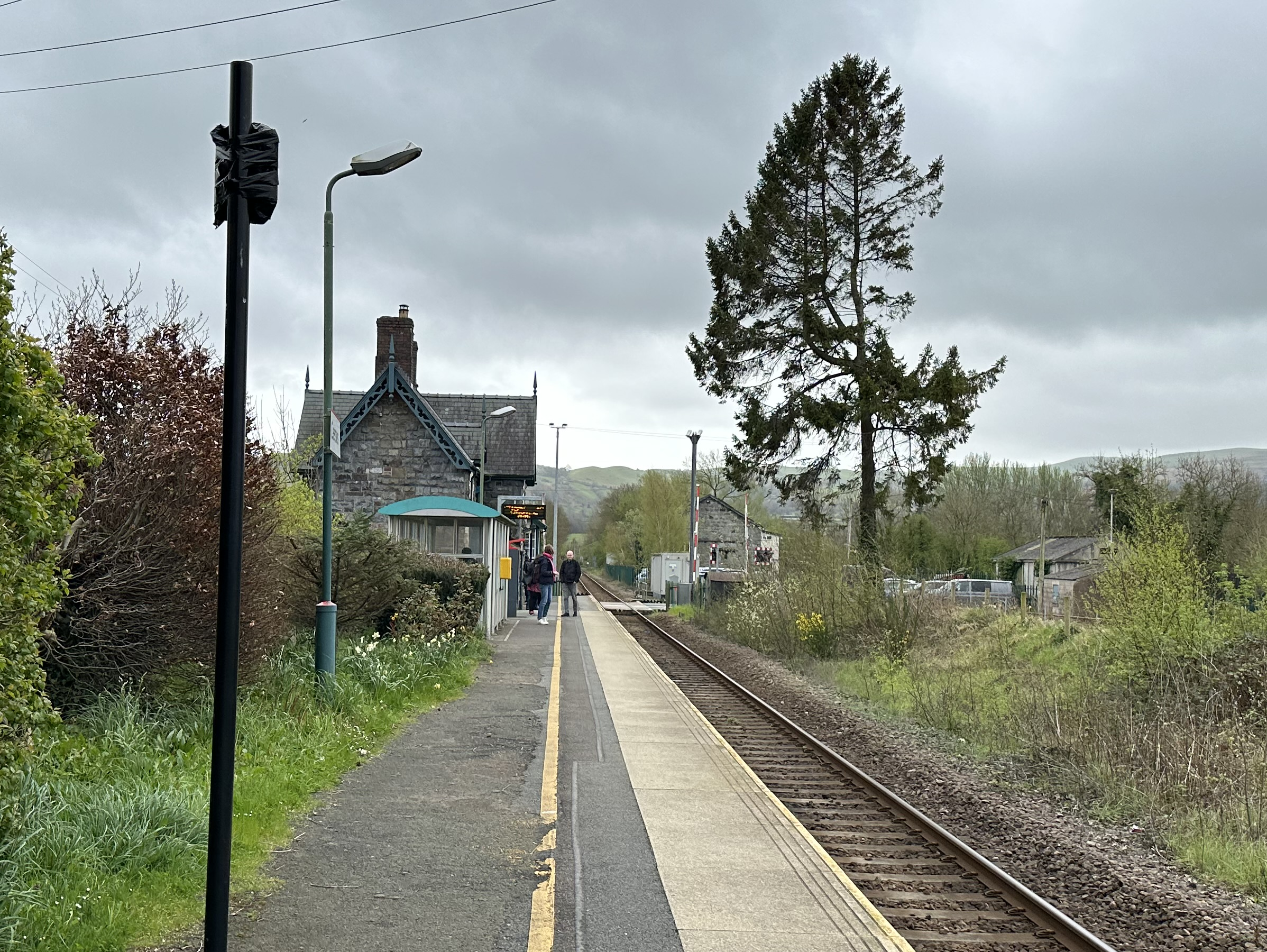

General information
- Location: Caersws, Powys; Wales
- Coordinates: 52.516°N 3.433°W
- Grid reference: SO028918
- Manager: Transport for Wales
- Platforms: 1

Other information
- Station code: CWS
- Classification: DfT category F1

History
- Opened: 3 January 1863
- Original company: Newtown and Machynlleth Railway
- Pre-grouping: Cambrian Railways

Passengers
- 2020/21: ▼13,196
- 2021/22: ▲31,398
- 2022/23: ▲42,500
- 2023/24: ▲49,136
- 2024/25: ▲69,134

Listed Building – Grade II
- Feature: Caersws railway station, with stationmaster’s house
- Designated: 28 August 1991
- Reference no.: 8697
Location
Notes
- Passenger statistics from the Office of Rail and Road

Caersws railway station is on the Cambrian Line in mid-Wales, serving the village of Caersws. It is notable in that there are 22 miles (35 km) separating this station and Machynlleth, the longest distance between two intermediate stations in Wales.

== History ==
The station was built by the Newtown and Machynlleth Railway of the Cambrian Railways in 1863. Originally there was a passing loop, a goods shed, a water tower, a ticket office and a signal box - the latter remained in use until March 2011 as a gate box to supervise the station level crossing (this is now operated from Machynlleth).

The station was threatened with closure in 1964 along with all of the other wayside stops on the former Cambrian main line (as a consequence of the Beeching cuts), but reprieved by the Minister of Transport Tom Fraser in December that year to act as the notional railhead for the town of Llanidloes (following the demise of the Mid-Wales Railway that served it directly).

In February 2013, Caersws station won the "Wales’ Best Unstaffed Train Station" award, supported by Keep Wales Tidy.

=== Van Railway ===
An independent railway the Van Railway started /terminated at Caersws serving lead mines ran from 1871 until 1940. There was a separate station and yard about 100 yards south west of the Cambrian Railways station. Passenger services operated from 1873 until 1879.

The notable Welsh romantic poet John Ceiriog Hughes was employed as a station master and Manager of the Van Railway at Caersws railway station from 1868 until his death in 1887.

After closure the station building was sold and was used by various companies as offices. In 2024 the station building was still standing with a portion of the platform.

	Disused railways	
Red House; Line and station closed	Cambrian Railways; Van Railway	Terminus

== Facilities ==
Though unstaffed, the station has a ticket machine installed. Train running information is offered via CIS displays, automated announcements, timetable poster boards and a customer help point. There is also a payphone available. Step-free access is available from the entrance to the platform.

== Services ==
There is a basic two-hourly service in each direction Mon-Sat, with some additional services in the morning and evening (most of which run between Shrewsbury and Aberystwyth only). Sundays also run every two hours, though there is only a limited service (one in winter, three in summer) along the Cambrian Coast line to Pwllheli.

Preceding station	National Rail	Following station
Machynlleth	Transport for Wales Cambrian Line	Newtown
	Historical railways	
Pontdolgoch; Line open, station closed	Cambrian Railways; Newtown and Machynlleth Railway	Moat Lane Junction; Line open, station closed

== Cultural references ==
The station once featured in an episode of the Teletubbies, with a family showing how to safely use a level crossing.

== Bibliography ==
- Butt, R. V. J. (October 1995). The Directory of Railway Stations: details every public and private passenger station, halt, platform and stopping place, past and present (1st ed.). Sparkford: Patrick Stephens Ltd. ISBN 978-1-85260-508-7. OCLC 60251199. OL 11956311M.
- Marshall, Geoff; Pipe, Vicki (2018). The Railway Adventures: Places, Trains, People and Stations. September Publishing. ISBN 978-1910463871.
