= Commins Coch Halt railway station =

Former railway station in Powys, Wales

Commins Coch Halt

General information
- Location: Commins Coch, Powys; Wales
- Coordinates: 52.6171°N 3.7094°W
- Grid reference: SH842035
- Platforms: 1

Other information
- Status: Disused

History
- Original company: Great Western Railway
- Post-grouping: Great Western Railway

Key dates
- 19 October 1931: Opened
- 14 June 1965: Closed
Location

Commins Coch Halt railway station was a station in Commins Coch, Powys, Wales. The station opened on 19 October 1931 and closed on 14 June 1965. The halt was located between the railway and the A470 road and consisted of a short timber edged platform and a waiting shelter.

Preceding station	Disused railways	Following station
Cemmes Road; Line open, station closed	Great Western Railway; Newtown and Machynlleth Railway	Llanbrynmair; Line open, station closed
