= Machynlleth railway station =

Railway station in Powys, Wales

Machynlleth
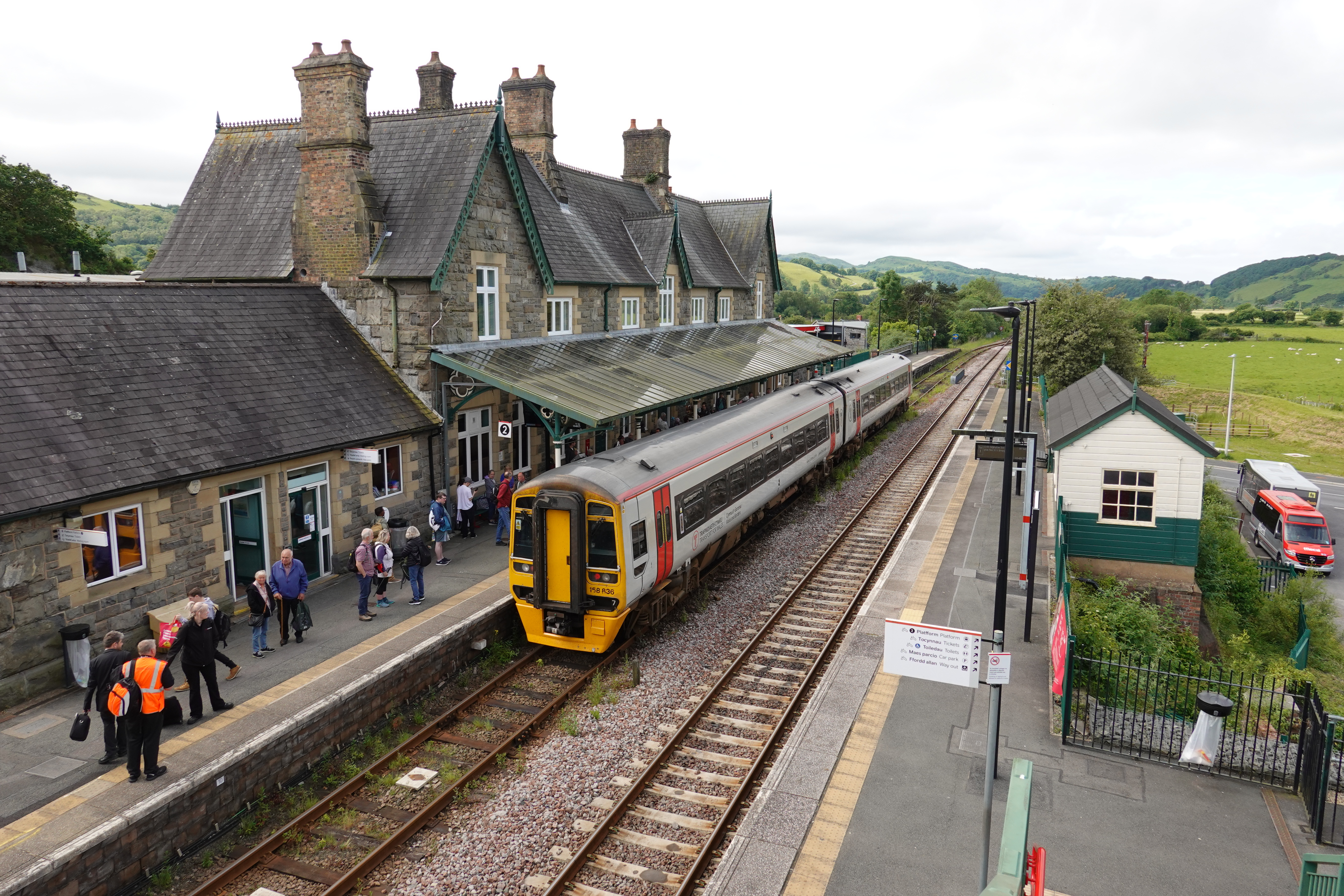

General information
- Location: Machynlleth, Powys; Wales
- Coordinates: 52.595°N 3.855°W
- Grid reference: SH744013
- Manager: Transport for Wales
- Platforms: 2

Other information
- Station code: MCN
- Classification: DfT category E

History
- Opened: 1863

Passengers
- 2021/22: ▲75,440
- Interchange: ▲6,314
- 2022/23: ▲100,138
- Interchange: ▲10,738
- 2023/24: ▲112,636
- Interchange: ▼10,115
- 2024/25: ▲128,212
- Interchange: ▲68,832
- 2025/26: ▲138,646
- Interchange: ▼10,523
Location
Notes
- Passenger statistics from the Office of Rail and Road

Machynlleth railway station is on the Cambrian Line in mid-Wales, serving the town of Machynlleth. It was built by the Newtown and Machynlleth Railway (N&MR) and subsequently passed into the ownership of the Cambrian Railways, the Great Western Railway, Western Region of British Railways and London Midland Region of British Railways. It is notable in that there are 22 miles (35 km) separating this station and Caersws, the longest distance between two intermediate stations in Wales.

The Corris Railway maintained their own Machynlleth station adjacent to the mainline one, with connecting passengers services until 1931 and slate transfer facilities until 1948.

== History ==
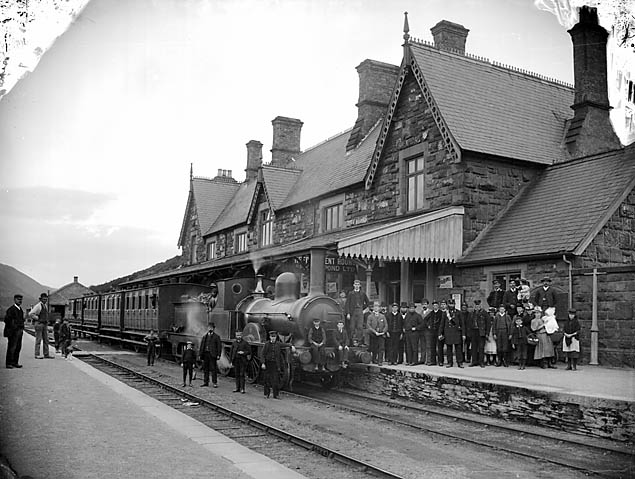
Machynlleth station, circa 1885, then on the Newtown and Machynlleth Railway

Eastbound local train in 1951

The lower yard of the station contained a number of sidings that served transshipment wharves connected to the Corris Railway. The first wharf was built in 1863 and leased by the Aberllefenni and Ratgoed quarries. The rest of the quarries connected to the Corris Railway leased wharf space there over the next 15 years.

The existing main line station dates from the opening of the Newtown and Machynlleth Railway in 1863. The following year, the Aberystwith and Welsh Coast Railway opened the line as far as Aberystwyth, via Dovey Junction; in 1867, the line was extended from Barmouth to Pwllheli, via Porthmadog (then Portmadoc). In 1868, the station and lines were absorbed into the Cambrian Railways. The Cambrian Railways were absorbed by the Great Western Railway on 1 January 1922, as a result of the Railways Act 1921, and became part of British Railways in 1948.

In 2016, a new footbridge was completed with a lift at both ends to improve disabled access between the platforms . The previous bridge was donated to Cambrian Heritage Railways.

== Motive power depot ==
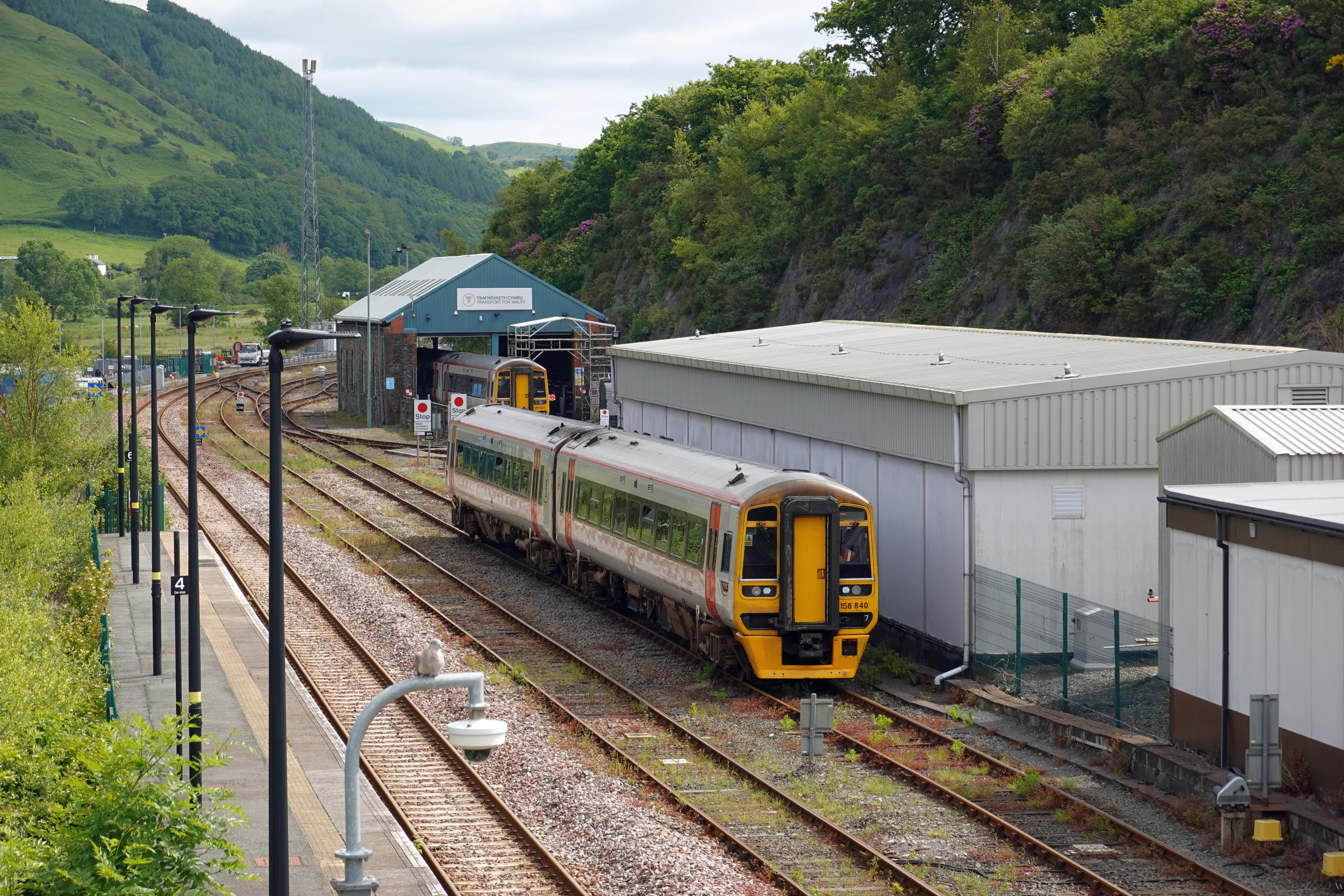
The former locomotive shed at Machynlleth station

The railway built a small engine shed at the station in 1863. This was later expanded by Cambrian Railways, but the extensions were demolished after 1966, when the depot ceased to be used for servicing steam locomotives. Only the original building now survives.

== Current operations ==
Machynlleth is the location where the majority of eastbound or 'up' trains from Pwllheli and Aberystwyth combine to go forward as one towards Shrewsbury and Birmingham International. Similarly, most trains in the opposite direction divide here before continuing west. The infrastructure along the line was upgraded during 2010/11, with the intention of allowing hourly trains to and from Aberystwyth. In the 2015-16 timetable, some additional Shrewsbury - Aberystwyth services operate to give an hourly interval frequency during the morning and evening peak periods.

Preceding station	National Rail	Following station
Dovey Junction	Transport for Wales Cambrian Line	Caersws
	Historical railways	
Dovey Junction; Line and station open	Cambrian Railways; Aberystwith and Welsh Coast Railway; Newtown and Machynlleth Railway	Cemmes Road; Line open, station closed
	Disused railways	
Machynlleth Town	Corris Railway	Ffridd Gate

Cambrian Line signalling has been centrally controlled from Machynlleth since the 1980s conversion of the route from traditional signalling to a radio-controlled 'RETB' system. On 26 March 2011, the new European Rail Traffic Management System signalling system went into operational use across the Cambrian Line controlled from Machynlleth. Two days of driver familiarisation followed, with passenger operation commencing on the morning of 28 March 2011. A new control centre has been built on the down side opposite the earlier signal box which has since been demolished.

A past train operator, Arriva Trains Wales, has also developed Machynlleth into the main depot for its fleet of Class 158 trains which provide all passenger services on the Cambrian Lines. Replacing the previous Victorian-era depot and yard, Arriva's depot opened in 2007 and prominently features environmentally friendly technologies such as rainwater harvesting and a wind turbine.

In 2011, The Bluebell Railway discovered a well-worn totem sign from Machynlleth during the excavating of Imberhorne Cutting as part of the northern extension to East Grinstead, which was used as a landfill site by the local council in the late 1960s. The extension was opened on 23 March 2013. The sign is now displayed in their new museum.

== Facilities ==
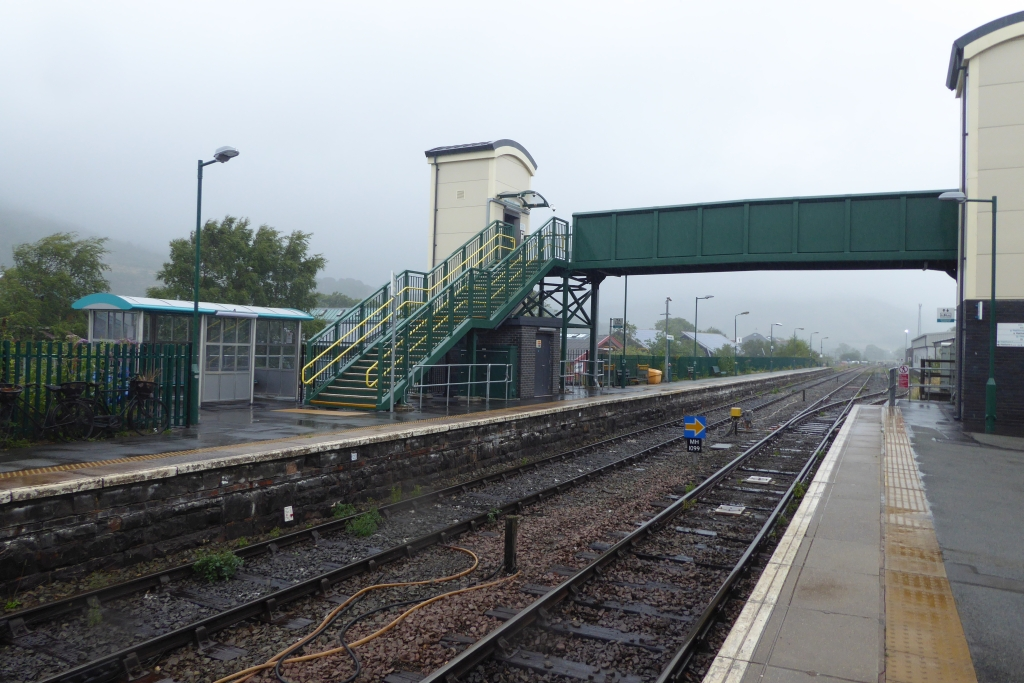
New footbridge (July 2018)

The station has a staffed ticket office in the main building on platform 2. This is open throughout the daytime, however when closed tickets must be bought on the train as no ticket machine is provided. There is a waiting room in the main building on platform 2 and a waiting room and shelter on platform 1. Public toilets are available. Train running information is provided by customer help points, CIS displays, automated announcements and timetable posters. Step free access is provided to both platforms by means of a footbridge with a lift at both ends. The previous ramp up to platform 1 from street level having closed with the foundations of the new bridge being built across it.
