= Llangurig railway station =

Railway station in Llangurig, Wales

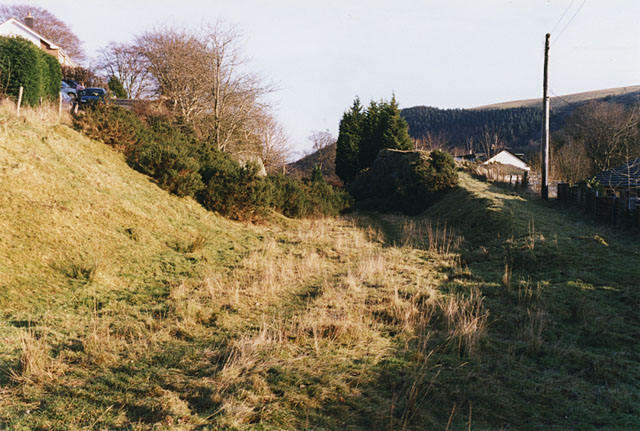
- Site of the proposed Llangurig railway station in 1998

General information
- Location: Llangurig, Powys; Wales
- Coordinates: 52.4072°N 3.6068°W
- Grid reference: SN907800

Other information
- Status: Disused

History
- Original company: Manchester and Milford Railway

Key dates
- 1872: Line opened
- 1882: Line lifted
Location

Llangurig railway station was intended to serve the village and rural locale of Llangurig in the Welsh county of Powys. The station, which was on the Llangurig branch, was built and operated by the Manchester and Milford Railway (M&MR). It was to be located in a shallow rock cutting just above the village.

== Background ==
A railway through Llangurig arose because of the rapid and chaotic growth of the Victorian railway network in Great Britain. In 1859, the Mid-Wales Railway (MWR) had received an Act of Parliament to build and run a railway from Newtown to Brecon via Builth Wells and then on to Merthyr Tydfil, Cardiff or Neath. But just as the MWR began building north towards Llanidloes, problems arose when the Manchester and Milford Railway (M&MR) finally received parliamentary assent to connect the industrial north west of England directly with the port of Milford Haven via a series of interconnecting lines in 1860. The initial proposal had been put forward in 1846 but the scheme was not passed until it received backing from the London and North Western Railway. As a result of this timing, Parliament had accidentally granted the M&MR and the MWR the same rights to build two separate lines through the same terrain.

In response the M&MR prioritised its work on completing the first section to Llanidloes by working west from Llangurig on what became known as the Llangurig branch to Penpontbren Junction. However, by 1861, surveyors and navvies from the competing companies were physically clashing south of the Llanidloes.

A further Act of Parliament was passed in 1862, giving the jointly owned Llanidloes and Newtown Railway (L&NR) (which was managed by the Cambrian Railways since 1860) the rights to extend southwards from Llanidloes with 1.5 miles (2.4 km) of double track to Penpontbren Junction where the M&MR Llangurig branch would diverge through the Cambrian Mountains to Strata Florida and the MWR line would continue to Builth Road (serving Builth Wells). The M&MR and MWR would both pay 5% "per annum" on construction costs and maintenance. The three companies would also pay equal shares of interest and running costs for a new station at Llanidloes. However these charges would eventually prove crippling for the M&MR. The northern section from Llanidloes to Newtown would be operated through the jointly owned L&NR; connecting the MWR and M&MR with the Oswestry and Newtown Railway. By 1864 navvies for the M&MR had laid rails and a passing loop at Llangurig. But no station buildings or other facilities were actually completed.

== Opening ==
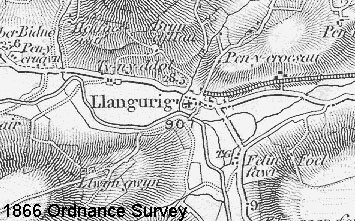
The Llangurig branch as built

The branch line was officially 'opened' on 28 October 1863 comprising approximately 4 miles from Penpontbren Junction to Llangurig station where there is no visible evidence that platforms were provided. A single MWR goods train was then hired by the L&NR to run along its entire length. This legally entitled the L&NR to invoice the M&MR for its share of the cost of building the joint junction station at Llanidloes, which it promptly did.

By 1875 the M&MR was in receivership because it had been unable to raise the capital required to complete the mountain section of the railway west of Llangurig or arrange running powers from the NW England to enable traffic to reach Milford Haven. Work was started beyond Llangurig through Mid Wales as far as the Blaen Myherin Tunnel, whose approach cuttings are still standing. However no work took place in the Afon Merin valley or westwards towards Devil's Bridge and Strata Florida. The 1.5 mile Llangurig branch from Penpontbren Junction was lifted in 1882.

In 1925 the Great Western Railway looked into reinstating the line to Llangurig. But it was never reopened. Nevertheless, the signal box at Penpontbren Junction was staffed until the old MWR mainline closed on 31 December 1962, under British Railways.

Preceding station	Disused railways	Following station
Penpontbren Junction	Llangurig branch Manchester and Milford Railway	Terminus
