= Dolwen railway station =

Former railway station in Powys, Wales

Dolwen
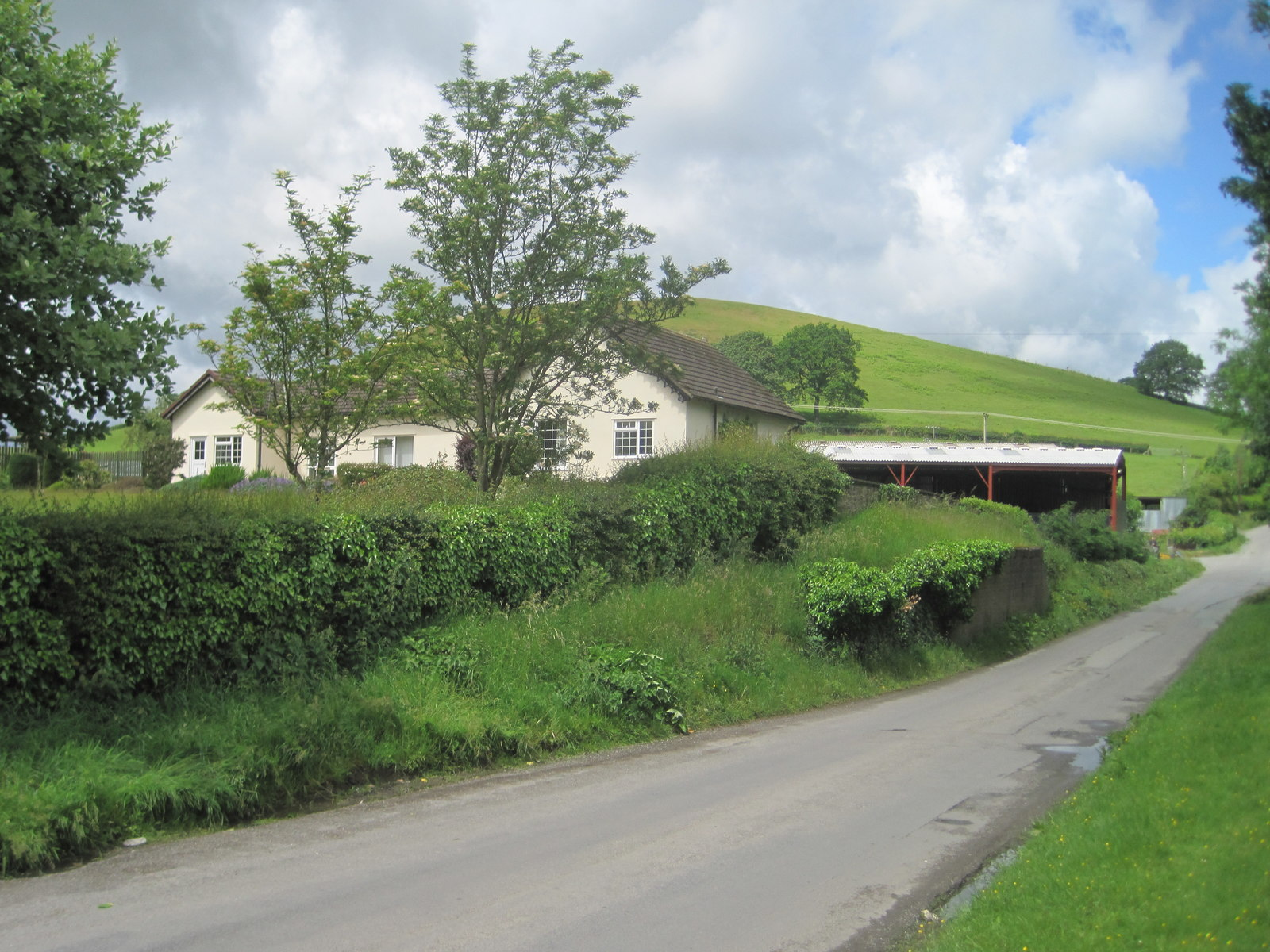

General information
- Location: Southwest of Llandinam, Powys; Wales
- Coordinates: 52.4568°N 3.4787°W
- Grid reference: SN995853

Other information
- Status: Disused

History
- Original company: Llanidloes and Newtown Railway
- Pre-grouping: Cambrian Railways
- Post-grouping: Great Western Railway

Key dates
- 31 August 1859: Opened
- 31 December 1962: closed
Location

Dolwen railway station was a station to the southwest of Llandinam, Powys, Wales. The station was opened in 1859 and closed in 1963. The station building is now a private residence.

Preceding station	Disused railways	Following station
Llandinam; Line and station closed	Cambrian Railways; Llanidloes and Newtown Railway	Llanidloes; Line and station closed
