= Llangurig branch =

Railway line in the UK

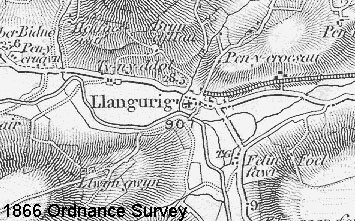
- Llangurig branch

Overview
- Status: Dismantled
- Owner: Manchester and Milford Railway (M&MR)
- Termini: Penpontbren Junction; Llangurig
- Stations: Llangurig

History
- Opened: 1864
- Closed: 1882

Technical
- Line length: 1.5 mi (2.4 km)
- Track gauge: 1,435 mm (4 ft 8 1/2 in) standard gauge

The Llangurig branch was a part of a proposed scheme by the Manchester and Milford Railway (M&MR) to connect industrialised Northwest England with the West Wales deep water port of Milford Haven. After various financial and construction difficulties, the 1.5 miles (2.4 km) of the Llangurig branch is noted as being the shortest lived working branch line in the United Kingdom, receiving only one train.

== Background ==
The M&MR was an ambitious proposal to connect Manchester, Northwest England and potentially the English Midlands with the deep water docks at Milford Haven. Not going anywhere near either location's name in its title, it was effectively a highly marketed connecting scheme using London and North Western Railway (LNWR) and Midland Railway rails as its feeder. Using the southern end of Oswestry and Newtown Railway, which connected to the LNWR for North Wales, Crewe and Manchester, the M&MR would connect Llanidloes to a junction at Devil's Bridge (for a branch line to Aberystwyth), and then onwards to connect with the Carmarthen and Cardigan Railway (C&CR) at Pencader. Trains would then have run on the C&CR to Carmarthen, before connecting to the Pembroke and Tenby Railway for termination at Milford Haven.

The business plan was that, combined with industrial traffic from South Wales, Milford Haven could "provide the Lancashire cotton industry with [an] alternative port to Liverpool." Predicted return traffic included American cotton for the mills of Manchester and Northwest England.

== Competing railway companies ==
During the Victorian era, the Welsh rail network was built piecemeal by many small companies. Parliament resultantly mistakenly granted two Acts of Parliament for two separate lines through the same piece of terrain, linking Llanidloes to Aberystwyth: one for the M&MR; the other for the Mid-Wales Railway (MWR).

The MWR had Parliamentary authorised running rights from Newtown to Brecon via Builth Wells, and hence onwards to Merthyr Tydfil, Cardiff or Neath. The MWR was authorised to build its line by an Act of Parliament passed in 1859. The M&MR was likewise authorised in 1860.

== Llanidloes and Newtown Railway ==
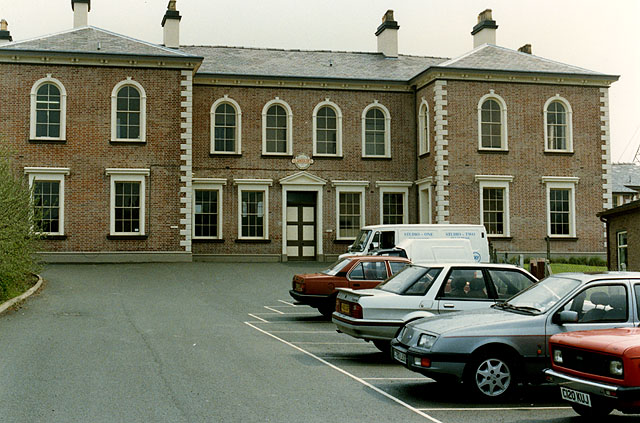
The restored Georgian-style façade of Llanidloes railway station in 1990.

The MWR and M&MR both knew that their approaches to Llanidloes covered exactly the same ground. This caused the M&MR to prioritise work on this section, working east from Llangurig. Resultantly, by 1861 the surveyors and navvies of the two competing workforces were physically clashing.

With the help of a local third party, an 1862 Act of Parliament authorised the creation of the joint-owned Llanidloes and Newtown Railway, which would extend southwards of Llanidloes with 1.5 miles (2.4 km) of double track to Penpontbren Junction, where the MWR and M&MR would diverge. The M&MR and MWR were to pay 5% "per annum" on construction costs and maintenance. Also the three companies were to pay equal shares of interest and running costs for the new Llanidloes railway station. These charges were eventually to prove crippling for the M&MR.

== Construction ==
Having moved its junction station for the branchline to Aberystwyth on cost grounds, from Devil's Bridge to Ystrad Meurig (later known as Strata Florida), the M&MR had let the contract for construction of the western 27 miles (43 km) mainline to a combined team of David Davies of Llandinam and Fredrick Beeston but it excluded the route onwards to Llanidloes, as it required additional surveying to overcome engineering and resultant cost difficulties.

The proposal was for the line to head west from Llanidloes by way of: Penpontbren Junction; Llangurig; Pant Mawr; through a tunnel under the present-day Cefn Croes Wind Farm to Blaen Myherin; then to descend down the Myherin valley south-west to Devil's Bridge then southwards crossing the River Ystwyth on a large viaduct at Ysbyty Ystwyth before descending to the revised junction station at Ystrad Meurig. The same contractors began cutting the route in 1865 and completed the construction of 0.5 miles (0.80 km) of trackbed west of Llangurig station (visible adjacent to the A44 road). After crossing to the south side of the A44 at Pont Aberbidno, crop markings visible on Google Earth showing the route was marked out south of the A44 at least as far as Pant Mawr with initial clearance works. In addition there is a significant civil engineering cutting leading up to the Cambrian Mountains tunnel (south-west of the present-day Sweet-Lamb motorsport complex) under Cefn Myherin. The location is about 800 m south west of Cae Gaer Roman Fort on the south side of the junction of Pistyll Fawr and Nant Ceiliogyn streams between the 370 and 380m contours. It is marked as 'Old Quarry' on the National Library of Scotland searchable maps for 1900. The south west end of the 2 km summit tunnel is at the end of a forest track past Blaen Myherin farmhouse again shown as 'Old Quarry' on early maps. It is again at the 370-380m contour, making the summit tunnel almost level, just south of the confluence of the Nant Chwarelmelyn stream and an unnamed stream from Llynnoedd Ieuan lakes. There is no evidence of construction in the Myherin valley north-east of Devil's Bridge other than the forestry track along the north side of the valley which may have been a construction road to give access to the portal. The Myherin Tunnel was one of the highest proposed or built in the UK, only just surpassed by the Torpantau Tunnel on the Brecon & Merthyr Railway at 400m in South Wales. Working the line would have been difficult with occasional blockages due to snow drifts likely in winter.

However, after the initial section of the Llangurig branch was built east of Llangurig station 52°24′23.62″N 3°36′15.24″W, a single MWR goods train hired by the L&NR ran along its entire length. This legally entitled the L&NR to invoice the M&MR for its share of the cost of the joint station at Llanidloes, which it promptly did. The branch service was immediately terminated by the M&MR, being wholly unprofitable without through traffic. The M&MR continued to pay for the cost of the joint station at Llanidloes, that it could not reach. The first train was also the last to use the line. A report in the Pembrokeshire Herald and General Advertiser dated 6 November 1863 states the first train ran 'Wednesday last' which would have been 29 October. The article refers to the haulage being the loco 'Llanerch-y-Dol' driven by a Mr Fairbanks (loco superintendent) and carrying the contractor a 'Mr Beesson', Mr Szlumper (the engineer) and company officials.

== Financial difficulties, closure ==
By 1864 the M&MR had changed its plans for crossing the Cambrian mountain range. They now wanted to abandon the route through Pant Mawr, and instead intended to follow the Nant Troedyresgair 52.39962°N 3.65829°W from Llangurig. This caused any work west of Llangurig to be abandoned. The route change was, in the event, not authorised by Parliament.

However, the MWR then proposed its own westward extension, which was authorised by an Act of Parliament in 1865. This was to branch west from Aber Marteg 52.33171°N 3.53898°W, up the Wye and Nant-y-Dernol 52.36283°N 3.61052°W valleys. On reaching this point, the MWR was then compelled by the Act to build another line from here directly to Llangurig, to join up with the M&MHR route, via a 1/5 mile (0.32 km) long tunnel under the Cambrian mountains and into Cwm Ystwyth. From there the M&MR were to provide lines to the south through Ystrad Meurig, and west to Aberystwyth.

1866 was a difficult financial year, the first after the end of the American Civil War (1860–1865). In the UK it encompassed the collapse of London Bank Overend, Gurney and Company, causing many industrial projects to encounter financial hardship. It has also further been suggested that the bankruptcy of Thomas Savin, renowned railway engineer and investor in the same period, may have been partly involved as it was with the failure of several other Welsh railway projects.

By 1876 MWR had still failed to build the new route, with the Act of Parliament permitting abandonment of the scheme. In 1882 the M&MR started to dismantle the Llangurig branch, lifting 1.5 miles (2.4 km) of the essentially unused track for maintenance purposes elsewhere. The M&MR opened the upgraded branchline to Aberystwyth in 1867.

The initial 1861 route survey (which had Parliamentary approval) and a later 1864 route were locally controversial. The unbuilt section between Strata Florida and the railhead of the Llangurig branch would have been through very mountainous terrain, although only 15 miles (24 km) in length as the crow flies.

== Absorption into the GWR ==
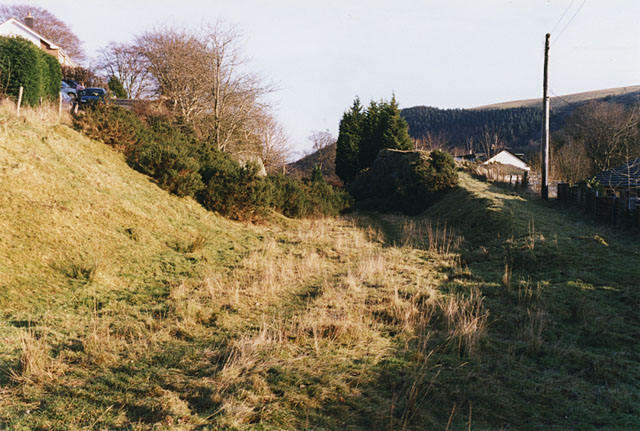
Site of the former Llangurig railway station, in November 1998

After emerging from 25 years of bankruptcy in 1900, it was hoped by passengers, freight customers and the authorities that a large railway company would take over the residual western M&MR. After the passing of two Acts of Parliament, in 1906 the Great Western Railway took over running of the M&MR, finally absorbing the company in 1911. The GWR merged the M&MR with the C&CR, worked together to become the Carmarthen to Aberystwyth line.

In 1923 after grouping, the GWR absorbed the Cambrian Railways, which included the L&NR. In 1925 it looked at reviving the line to Llangurig and beyond as a branchline, but discovered it had itself sold-off the associated land when it had fully absorbed the M&MR in 1911. Penpontbren Junction signal box and signalling were recorded in a series of photographs in the L&GRP collection dated 1904. The signal box was boarded up with the access steps removed and the signals set at “proceed”.

== Present day ==
A large part of the route east of Llangurig is marked on current Ordnance Survey maps as "dismantled railway". Much of the course is close to the A470 road through Nant Gwynwydd, being clearly visible. Some earthworks, including some 1.5 km west of Llangurig visible on Google Earth (including crop markings) north of the A44 and south of the road west of Pont Aberbidno, where old maps show the A44 was to pass under the railway. The tunnel headings survive from the original 1861 M&MR scheme west of Llangurig. as do the ruins of Llangurig station. The north entrance to Bryn Myherin Tunnel is visible on old maps published in the 1880s marked as an 'old quarry' south east of Cae Gaer Roman Fort at the junction of Nant Ceiliogyn and Pistyll Fawr at about 375m contour. The south end of the tunnel in the Blaen Myherin glaciated valley appears to be at a similar height 2.2 km south west at a point marked as 'old quarry' on old maps, about 800m north of Blaen Myherin farm, near the junction of Nanr Chwarelmelyn and the unnamed waterfalls to the north. Much of the easily graded forestry track along the north side of the Afon Merin valley down to its junction with the Afon Mynach, just east of Devil's Bridge, may have followed the proposed line of the abandoned railway and may have been constructed on the alignment to give access to the tunnel headings site.

== See also ==
- List of never used railways
