= Glan-yr-Afon Halt railway station =

Former railway station in Powys, Wales

Glan-yr-Afon Halt

General information
- Location: Southeast of Tylwch, Powys; Wales
- Coordinates: 52.3932°N 3.4902°W
- Grid reference: SN986783
- Platforms: 1

Other information
- Status: Disused

History
- Original company: Great Western Railway
- Post-grouping: Great Western Railway

Key dates
- 16 January 1928: opened
- 1962: Closed
Location

Glan-yr-Afon Halt railway station was a station to the southeast of Tylwch, Powys, Wales. The station was closed in 1962.

Preceding station	Disused railways	Following station
Tylwch; Line and station closed	Great Western Railway; Mid-Wales Railway	Pantydwr; Line and station closed
