= Llandinam railway station =

Former railway station in Powys, Wales

Llandinam
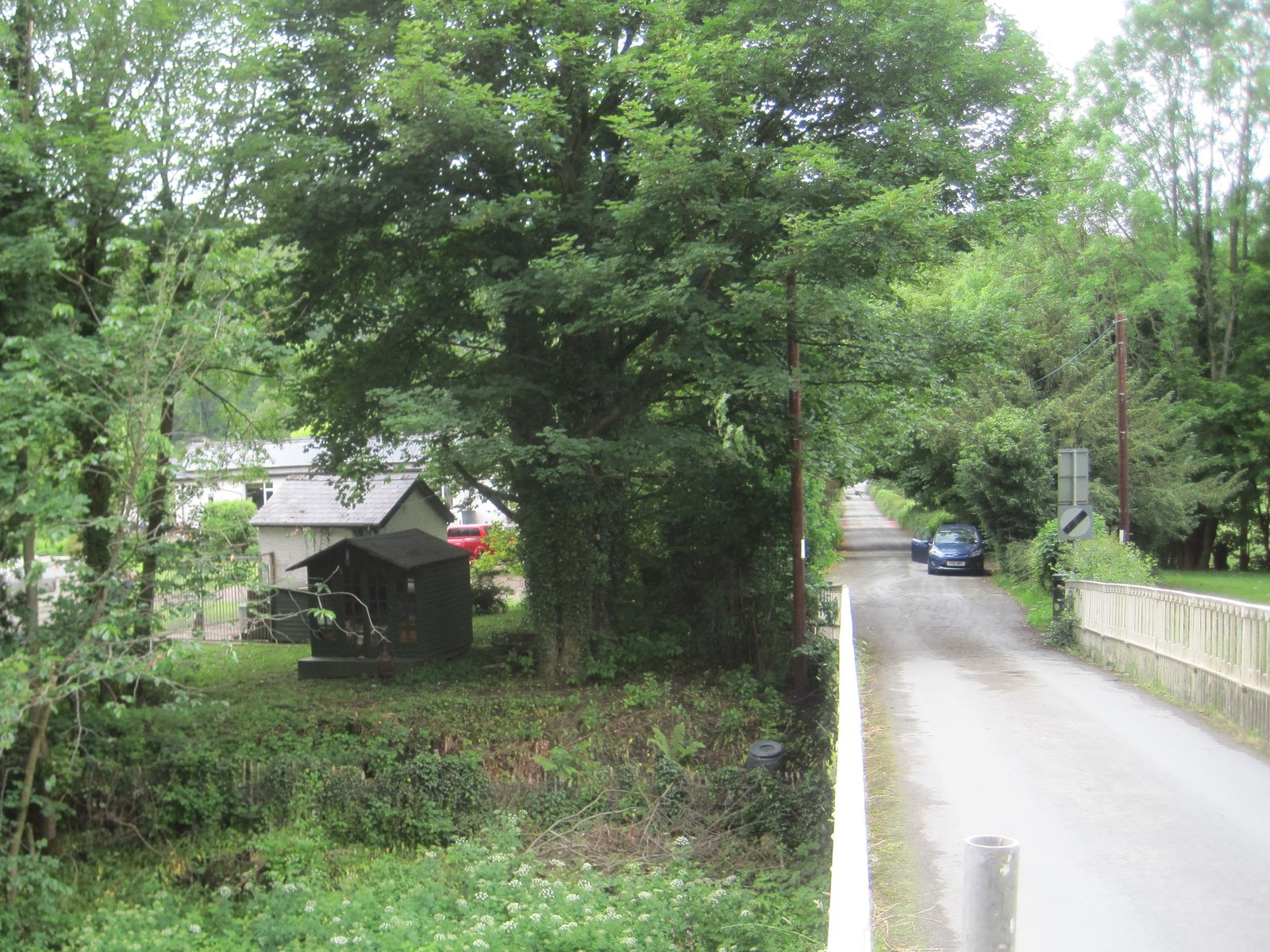
- Site of Llandinam railway station, next to the River Severn, in 2017

General information
- Location: Llandinam, Powys; Wales
- Coordinates: 52.4863°N 3.4380°W
- Grid reference: SO023886
- Platforms: 1

Other information
- Status: Disused

History
- Original company: Llanidloes and Newtown Railway
- Pre-grouping: Cambrian Railways
- Post-grouping: Great Western Railway

Key dates
- 1859: opened
- 1962: closed
Location

Llandinam railway station was a station serving Llandinam, Powys, on the Llanidloes and Newtown Railway (L&NR) line. The L&NR was authorised in August 1853; construction began in October 1855 and the line was opened between those points for goods traffic only on 30 April 1859 – passengers were carried from 31 August 1859. Llandinam was one of three intermediate stations on the 13-mile line. The station was opened in 1859 by David Davies who was born in Llandinam and was a major contractor for building the line. In July 1864 the L&NR amalgamated with three other railways to create the Cambrian Railways, which in January 1922 amalgamated with the Great Western Railway which itself became part of British Railways in 1948.

It closed to passengers at the end of 1962, and finally to goods in 1967.

The station fronted the River Severn beyond Llandinam Bridge and is now a private dwelling. There remains a section of track embedded in the road from the A470 to Broneirion at the former level crossing site.

== Services ==
In 1904, the station could handle goods, passengers and parcels, but there were no facilities for the conveyance by rail of road vehicles or livestock. There was no crane for loading goods wagons. By 1956, however, the station could accommodate “furniture vans, carriages, motor cars, portable engines, and machines, on wheels” as well as live stock, horse boxes and prize cattle vans, as well as “carriages and motor cars by passenger or parcels train”.

Passenger services in October 1904 comprised seven down (southbound) services each day from Moat Lane, of which three ran only as far as Llanidloes; one ran to Builth Wells; and three ran right through to Brecon. In the up (northbound) direction, there were six trains to Moat Lane, three of which originated at Brecon; one at Builth Wells; and two at Llanidloes. On Sundays, there was one train in each direction, running between Moat Lane and Brecon. Three of the daily down services stopped only by request. In October 1942 there were six passenger trains per day in each direction, and one in each direction was extended beyond Moat Lane to Whitchurch but there was no longer a Sunday service. By 1962 there were nine trains in each direction, and there was now a through service to and from Cardiff Queen Street.

Preceding station	Disused railways	Following station
Moat Lane Junction; Line and station closed	Cambrian Railways; Llanidloes and Newtown Railway	Dolwen; Line and station closed
