= Afon Dulas, Llanidloes =

River in Powys, Wales

Afon Dulas
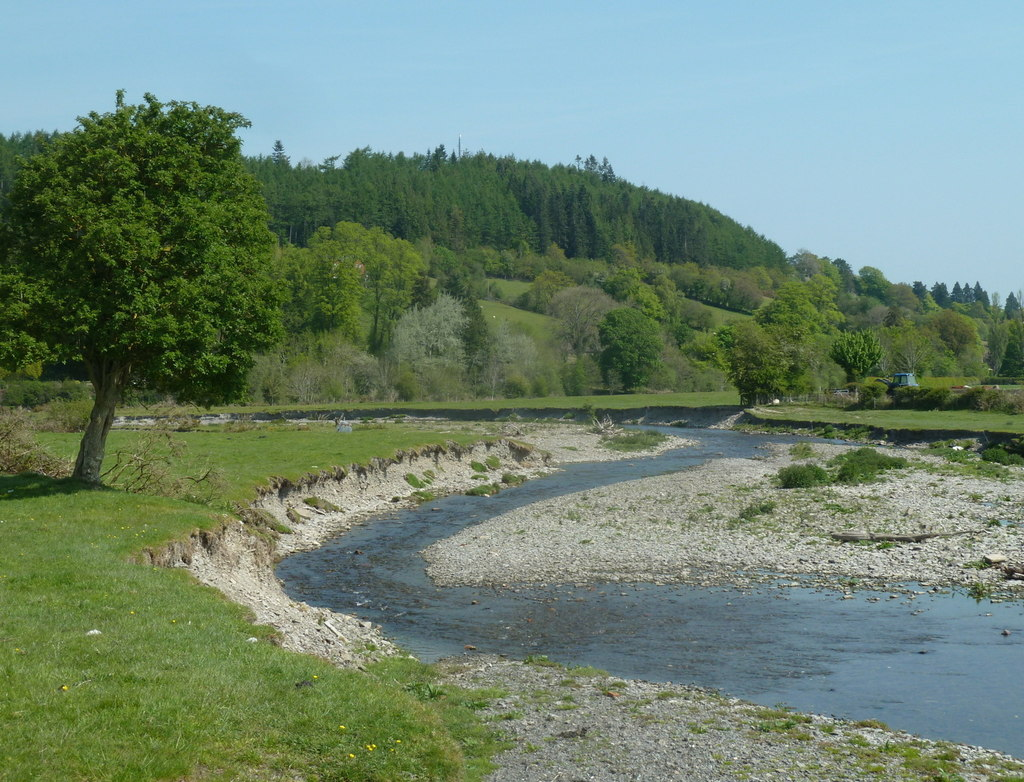
- Afon Dulas near to its confluence with the River Severn

Location
- Country: Wales
- Region: Powys

Physical characteristics
- Mouth
  - location: River Severn near Llanidloes
  - coordinates: 52.4424°N 3.5519°W
- Basin size: 64.4 km^{2} (24.9 sq mi)
- Discharge
  - location: Rhos-y-pentref
  - average: 1.41 m^{3}/s (50 cu ft/s)
  - maximum: 47 m^{3}/s (1,700 cu ft/s)

The Afon Dulas is a river in Powys, Wales (Afon is Welsh for river). It is a headwater tributary of the River Severn, which it joins at Llanidloes opposite the confluence with the Afon Clywedog. Its principal tributary is the Afon Brochan. The total length of the Dulas and Brochan is 19.6 km. Other tributaries include Nant Cydros, the Rhydyclwydau Brook and Nant Gynwydd.

== Course ==
It rises at Cwm y Saeson, and flows east past Cefn Llech to Sychnant, where it is joined by the Full Brook. Here it turns north past the ford at Rhyd Myheryn at Glanyrafon, receiving the Rhydyclwydau Brook on the right bank. The old track bed of the Mid-Wales Railway follows the course of the Dulas from this point, through the valley towards Llanidloes railway station. The Dulas continues flowing north-west past the village of Tylwch beyond which it forms a narrow rocky gorge, which has been used by whitewater kayakers, although fallen trees across the gorge are a reported hazard. At Rhos-y-pentref, where the river is measured, it is joined by Nant Gynwydd, and is crossed by the A470 road. Turning north once more, the river passes Upper Glandulas where it meets its last tributary the Afon Brochan, before joining the Severn to the south-west of Llanidloes at Felindre.

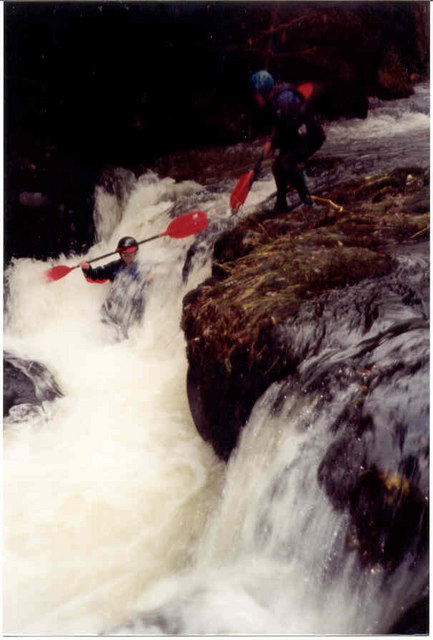
Kayakers in Dulas Gorge

== Hydrology ==
The flow of the Dulas has been measured at a flume, in the lower reaches at Rhos-y-pentref since 1969. This long-term record shows that the catchment of 52.7 square kilometres (20.3 sq mi) to the gauging station yielded an average flow of 1.4 cubic metres per second (49 cu ft/s). The highest river level recorded at the station occurred in October 1998 with a height of 2.4 metres (7 ft 10 in) through the flume, giving a corresponding flow of 47 cubic metres per second (1,700 cu ft/s).

The Dulas catchment upstream of the station has a substantial average annual rainfall of 1,269 millimetres (50.0 in) and a maximum altitude of 571 metres (1,873 ft) at Crugyn Llwyd hill on the eastern edge of the watershed, near to the Pegwn Mawr windfarm. Land use within the basin is described as "mainly pasture, forest and moorland".

== See also ==
- List of rivers in Wales
