= Moat Lane Junction railway station =

Former railway station in Powys, Wales

Moat Lane Junction
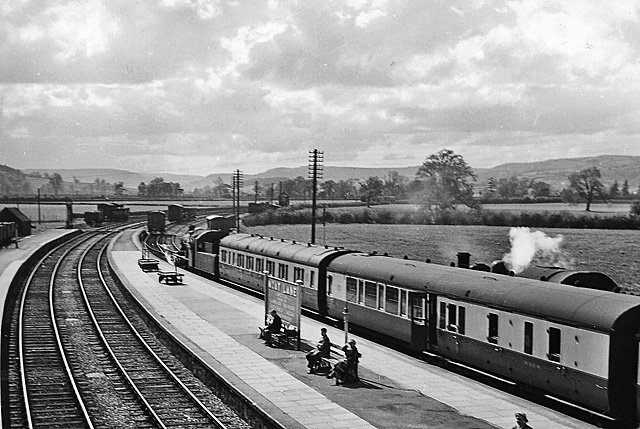
- Moat Lane Junction Station in 1957

General information
- Location: Caersws, Powys; Wales
- Coordinates: 52.5095°N 3.4122°W
- Grid reference: SO041911
- Platforms: 4

Other information
- Status: Disused

History
- Original company: Llanidloes and Newtown Railway; Newtown and Machynlleth Railway
- Pre-grouping: Cambrian Railways
- Post-grouping: Great Western Railway

Key dates
- 1859: first station opened
- 1863: resited
- 1962: Closed
Location

Moat Lane Junction was a railway junction in Montgomeryshire near to the village of Caersws in mid-Wales. It was the junction where the Newtown and Machynlleth Railway opened in 1863 diverged from the Llanidloes and Newtown Railway which opened four years earlier. Although having only three through platforms, by rural standards it was a busy interchange station and in its heyday possessed a refreshment room.

Moat Lane Junction is often quoted as a defining feature of the Great Western Railway in Wales, namely its inheritance of junctions in unlikely and inconvenient locations. Other examples are Afon Wen, Talyllyn Junction, Dovey Junction and Barmouth Junction (renamed Morfa Mawddach in 1960).

== History ==
The first station at Moat Lane, opened in 1859, was located a short distance to the south-west of the later junction station, and was intended to serve Caersws. On the opening of the Machynlleth line in 1863 a new station was built in the ‘V’ of the junction and replaced the original station. This had a single straight platform face serving Llanidloes trains and a curved platform serving the new line. Since the latter was now the major route, an island platform was also provided on the curve, providing three platforms trains to/from the Machynlleth direction.

Both originating railways became part of the Cambrian Railways. Beyond Llanidloes, the Mid-Wales Railway to Brecon was opened in 1864, but was operated separately until 1888, passengers needing to change at Llanidloes. From that date, trains ran through from Moat Lane Junction.

Reflecting the lower status of the earlier Llanidloes line, through running of passenger trains from Newtown to the Mid-Wales line eventually ceased, and the original single platform sufficed throughout its life.

The station closed on 31 December 1962 together with passenger services to Llanidloes and Brecon. Shortly after closure the station was demolished apart from a small section of platform, now occupied by farming equipment. The first station (closed in 1863) became a private house.

Preceding station	Historical railways	Following station
Caersws; Line and station open	Cambrian Railways; Newtown and Machynlleth Railway	Scafell Halt; Line open, station closed
Llandinam; Line and station closed	Cambrian Railways; Llanidloes and Newtown Railway	Scafell Halt; Line open, station closed
