= Llandinam Bridge =

Bridge in Powys, Wales

Coordinates: 52.48645°N 3.43698°W

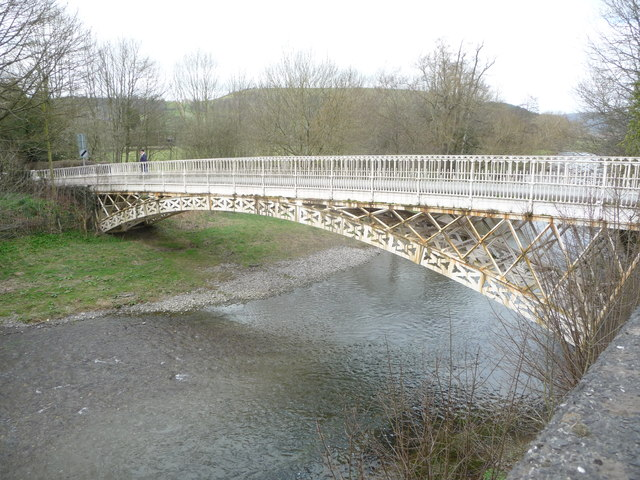
Llandinam Bridge

Llandinam Bridge (Welsh: Pont Llandinam) is a single-arch cast-iron Grade II*-listed bridge located in Llandinam, Powys, Wales. Constructed in 1846, it was the first cast-iron bridge in the county of Montgomeryshire, and was designed by Thomas Penson to replace an earlier timber bridge.

== Description ==
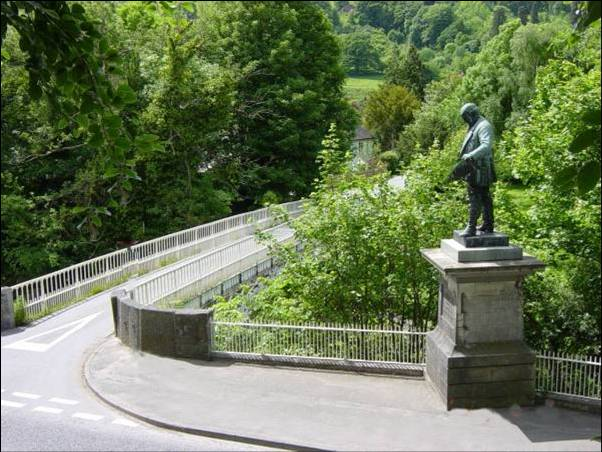
Llandinam Bridge with a statue of industrialist David Davies.

Llandinam Bridge is located in the northern section of the village of Llandinam and is near the main A470 road as well as its byroad west over the River Severn. The bridge is made of cast iron and consists of a single segmental arch which is 27.4 metres (90 ft) long and rises by 2.7 metres (8.9 ft). It consists of three curved cast-iron ribs which are 685 millimetres (68.5 cm) deep and 63 millimetres (6.3 cm) wide and are made from five X-shaped lattice panels. The bridge's spandrels are of an X-shaped pattern which are stiffened and tied laterally by cruciform and circular cross-members and is similar in design to the Mythe Bridge in Tewkesbury, Gloucestershire.

Its surface is flat and falls towards the west and is 3.4 metres (11 ft) wide. 1.1 metres (3.6 ft)-high horizontal girders run along both sides of the bridge and the girders on the west side date from 1846. Llandinham Bridge has ashlar masonry abutments which are sloped at 30 degrees from the point of connection with the bridge's arches and were built by Gellidywyll-based designer Edward Jones. A statue of industrialist David Davies is located at the east end of the bridge adjacent to the A470 road who laid the foundations of the bridge.

== History ==
Contract tenders for the construction of Llandinam Bridge across the River Severn were put out in June 1842. The bridge was built in 1846 by the Montgomeryshire county surveyor Thomas Penson which replaced an earlier bridge on the site and was cast by the Hawarden Ironworks in Flintshire. The bridge was constructed on the principles of the bridges in Craigellachie, Moray built by architect Thomas Telford and its design made it the first cast-iron bridge in Montgomeryshire. In 1906 Montgomeryshire County Council forbade vehicles weighing over three tonnes to use the bridge. Llandinam Bridge was conferred with a Grade II*-listed status on 15 February 1994, and about eight years later it was repainted.

== See also ==
- Crossings of the River Severn
- List of bridges in Wales
