= Llangurig =

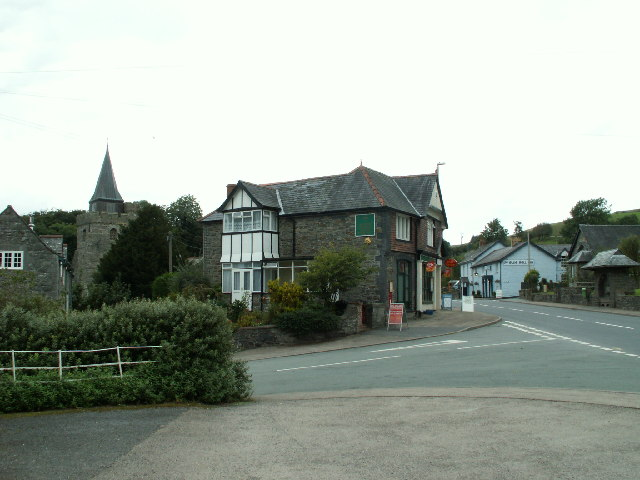
- Llangurig shop, church, Blue Bell pub and junction

- Location within Powys
- Population: 723 (2011)
- OS grid reference: SN909797
- Principal area: Powys
- Preserved county: Powys
- Country: Wales
- Sovereign state: United Kingdom
- Post town: Llanidloes
- Postcode district: SY18
- Dialling code: 01686
- Police: Dyfed-Powys
- Fire: Mid and West Wales
- Ambulance: Welsh
- UK Parliament: Montgomeryshire and Glyndŵr
- Senedd Cymru – Welsh Parliament: Montgomeryshire
- Website: Llangurig Community Council
- List of places UK Wales Powys 52.40440°N 3.60513°W Community map: Map of the community

Llangurig is a village and community in Montgomeryshire, Powys, Wales. The population was 723 in the 2011 UK Census. The community includes the hamlet of Cwmbelan.

The River Wye, the A470 and the A44 trunk roads pass through Llangurig, as do the National Cycle Route 8 and the Wye Valley Walk.

The 15th century parish church located in the village is dedicated to Saint Curig, its reputed founder, and is a grade II* listed building. There are also two small chapels.

The village has been home for many decades to a craft shop as well as two public houses, a number of bed and breakfasts and a small village shop and Post Office. The manor house, Clochfaen Hall, was designed by architect William Arthur Smith Benson, a designer of the Arts and Crafts movement. He also designed the drinking fountain between the road and the village green, the erection of which commemorates the completion of the village's piped water supply, a scheme begun by Colonel Gerald Hope Lloyd-Verney, to whom the fountain is also a memorial.

Llangurig used to have a small primary school. In January 2003, the school had only 19 pupils. In 2006, a successful campaign against closure by the local council was fought. The school eventually closed at the end of the 2008 academic year.

The village holds an annual agricultural show and sheepdog trials in August.

== 'The Railway that never was' ==
During the Victorian era, Llangurig nearly had a railway service. The Llangurig branch is noted as being the shortest lived working branch line in the UK, receiving only one train.

Wales' rail network was built piecemeal by many small companies, and Parliament mistakenly granted acts for two lines through the same piece of terrain, linking Llanidloes to Aberystwyth: one for the Manchester and Milford Railway; the other for the Mid-Wales Railway. The M&MR intended to connect the two settlements with a route across Wales, to enable the industrialised Northwest to access the deep-water port in Milford Haven, West Wales.

The MWR was authorized to build its line by act of parliament in 1859. The M&M was likewise authorized in 1860. The line was to head west from Llanidloes by way of Llangurig to Pant Mawr, through a tunnel, turning southwards for Ysbyty Ystwyth and Tregaron, finally connecting with the Carmarthen & Cardigan Railway at Pencader.

After resolving difficulties of accessing Llanidloes through the creation of the joint Llanidloes and Newtown Railway, it would extend 1.5 miles (2.4 km) of double track southwards to Penpontbren, where the MWR and M&MR would diverge. The M&MR and MWR were to pay 5% per annum on construction costs and maintenance. Also the three companies were to pay equal shares of interest and running costs for the new station at Llanidloes. These charges were eventually to prove crippling for the M&MR.

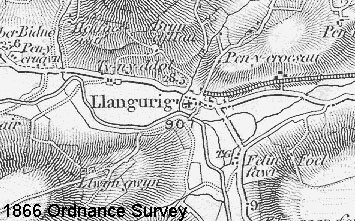
The Llangurig branch line as built

The Llangurig branch was fully built, and a single goods train ran along its length, at which point the L&NR invoiced the M&MR for the cost of the joint station at Llanidloes. The branch service was immediately terminated, being wholly unprofitable without through traffic. The M&MR continued to pay for the cost of the joint station they could not reach.

By 1864 the M&MR had changed its plans for crossing the Pumlumon range, and hence stopped all work west of Llangurig. 1866 was a difficult year, including the collapse of the London Bank Overend, Gurney and Company, causing many industrial projects to encounter financial hardship. By 1876 MWR had still failed to build the new route, with an act of parliament permitting abandonment of the scheme. In 1882 the M&MHR started to dismantle the Llangurig branch, lifting 1.5 miles (2.4 km) of the essentially unused track for maintenance purposes elsewhere.

A large part of the route east of Llangurig is marked on current OS maps as 'dismantled railway', much of the course close to the A470 road through Nant Gwynwydd being clearly visible. Some earthworks and tunnel approach excavations survive from the original M&MR scheme west of Llangurig, as does Llangurig station site.

== See also ==
- List of never used railways
