= Broneirion =

Broneirion, Llandinam, Montgomeryshire
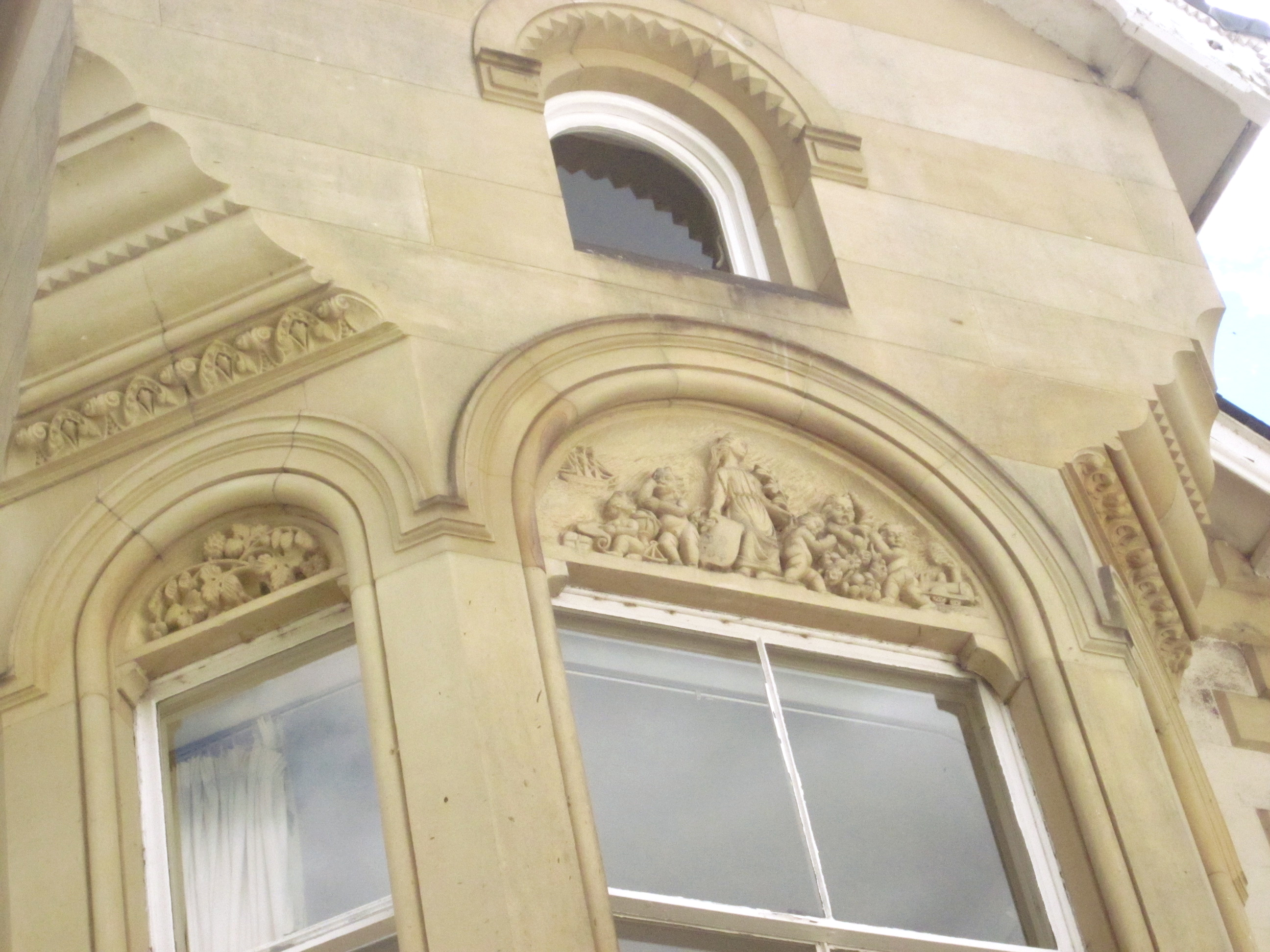
- Broneirion decorative carving

- Location within Powys
- 52.489124°N 3.443864°W

History
- Built: 1864-5

Site notes
- Architect(s): David Walker of Poundley and Walker
- Architectural style: Italianate/Romanesque revival
- Governing body: Girl Guiding, Cymru

Listed Building – Grade II
- Designated: 26 Nov 1996
- Reference no.: CADW 17775

Broneirion
- Owner: Girlguiding Cymru
- Location: Llandinam, Wales
- Country: United Kingdom

Broneirion is a Victorian house and grounds on the hillside across the River Severn from the village of Llandinam. It was built by Welsh industrialist David Davies. It has been used as a training centre for Girl Guides since 1946 and has been owned since 1992 by Girlguiding Cymru. In 2022, they announced the mansion had been put on sale and the centre would be closed.

== History ==
The house was built in the italianate/Romanesque revival style in 1864–65 by the architect David Walker It is set on four and a half acres. The roof is Welsh slate. In November 1996, Broneirion House, Coach House, and the Lodge all became Grade II listed buildings. The bridge from the main road towards Broneirion was the first iron bridge constructed in Montgomeryshire, designed by Thomas Penson and built by Davies. It spans 90 feet (27.5 m).

The Davies family moved into the house in 1864.

In 1940, Davies' grandson, David Davies, 1st Baron Davies, offered the use of the house to Gordonstoun school, which needed a new home due to World War II.

== Guiding Centre ==
Lord Davies and his son, David Michael, the succeeding 3rd Baron Davies, both died in 1944. The latter's widow, Lady Eldrydd Davies, was a supporter of Guiding. Her friend, Heather Kay was enthusiastic about a training centre for Welsh Guides, so Lady Davies offered Broneirion for this purpose.

Broneirion became the Welsh Training Centre for the Girl Guide Association in 1946 and was opened by the World Chief Guide, Olave Baden-Powell, in 1947. In 1992 it became the property of Girlguiding Cymru after a campaign that raised £510,000 for the purchase and an endowment fund. At the same time, a much-needed campsite was purchased close to the house and named Cae Gwenllian. In 1995, the opportunity unexpectedly arose to buy Broneirion Lodge, on the property boundary. Both the house and grounds are used for training and camping activities, and the site is used by Guides, other organisations and private groups. The Brownie house, originally the Davies children's summer house is now a Pack Holiday facility.

=== Cae Gwenllian ===
Broneirion's campsite, Cae Gwenllian, was purchased in 1994. It is named after Girlguiding Cymru's Treasurer and former Chief Commissioner, Gwenllian Philipps. It has a toilet block and an equipment store.

=== Future of Guiding Centre ===
In October 2022, Girlguiding Cymru offered the 30-room Broneirion mansion up for sale for £3 million, in addition to its Lodge House, Coach House, Summer House and approximately 10 acres of grounds, and announced they would close the Centre. The Chief Commissioner of Girlguiding Cymru gave as their reasons for sale the decline of Girlguiding membership and use of the centre, increased running costs and the effects of the recent COVID pandemic on business. It was hoped to invest the proceeds into improving Girlguiding facilities elsewhere in Wales.

== Broneirion Gallery ==
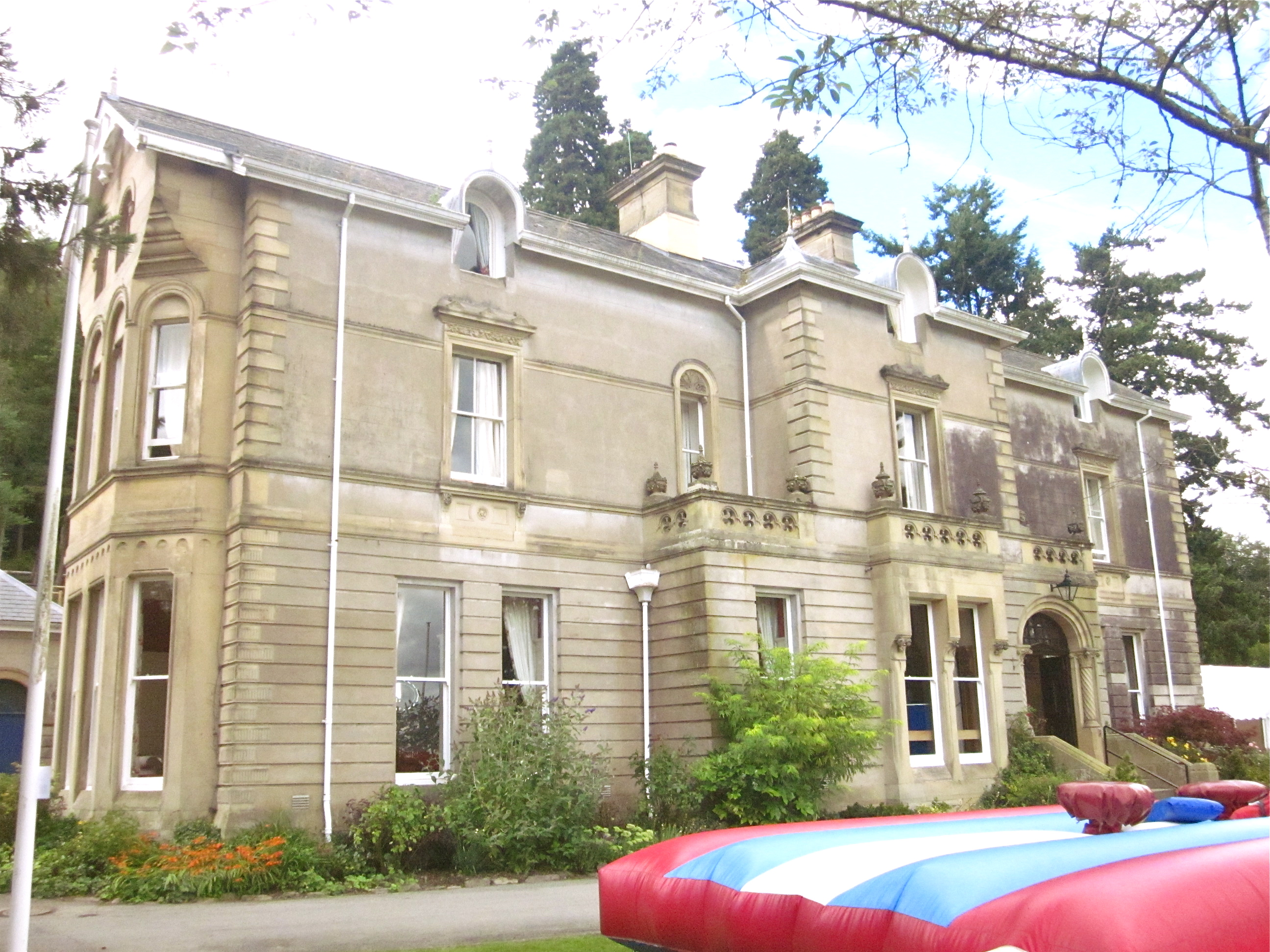
Broneirion, Entrance facade

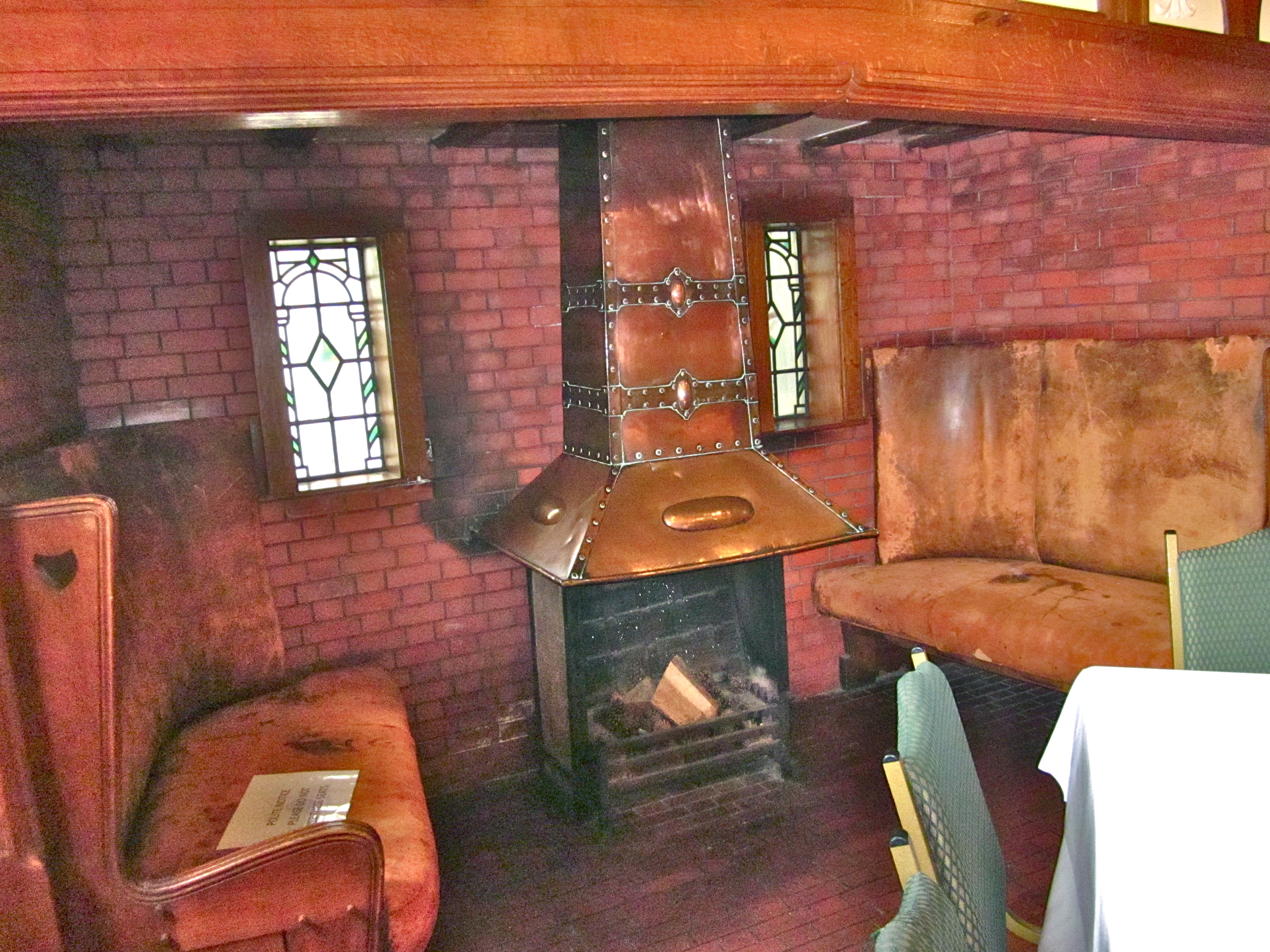
Broneirion, Inglenook fireplace

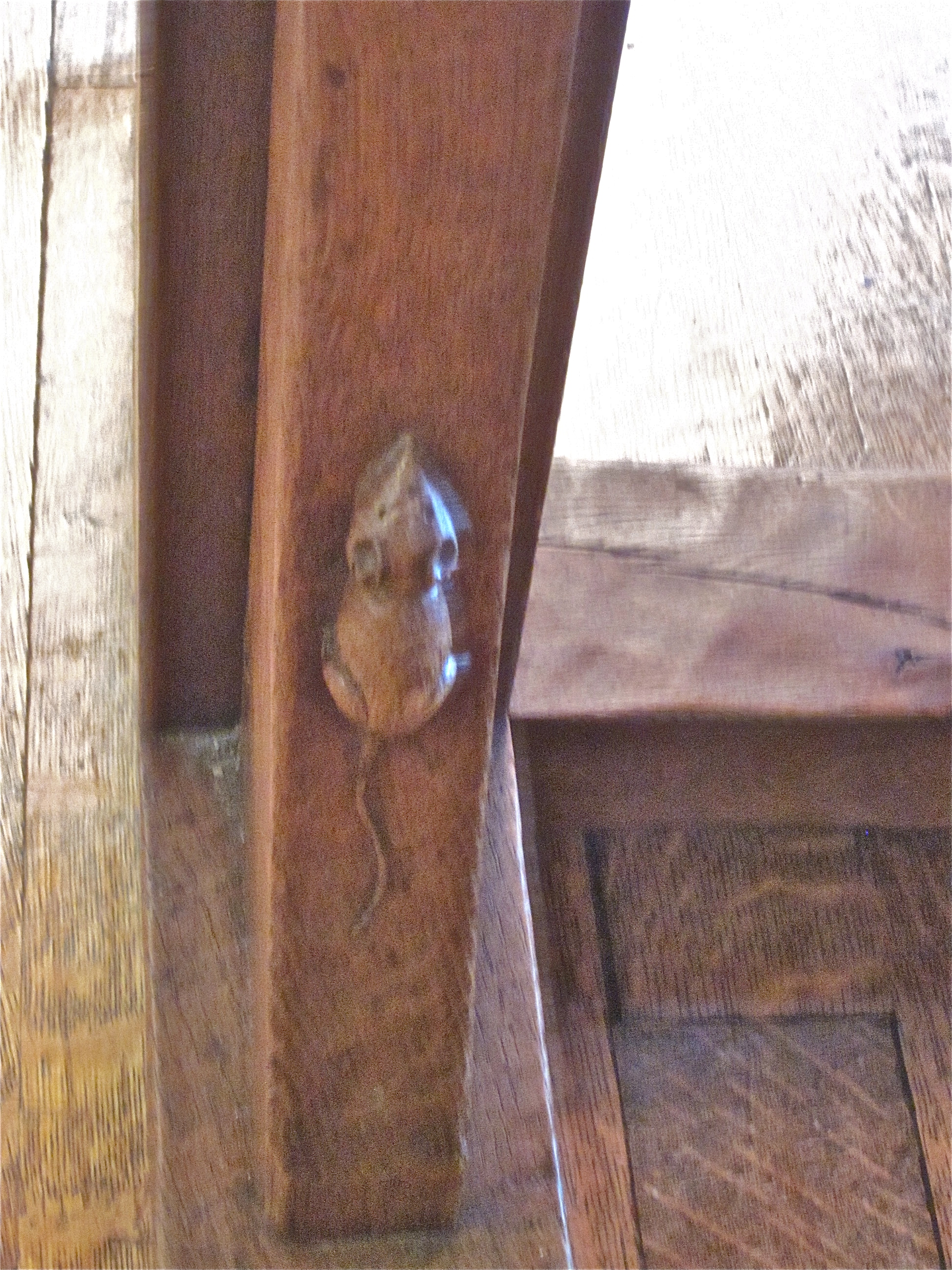
Broneirion, Mouseman Thompson's mouse on table leg in Dining Room

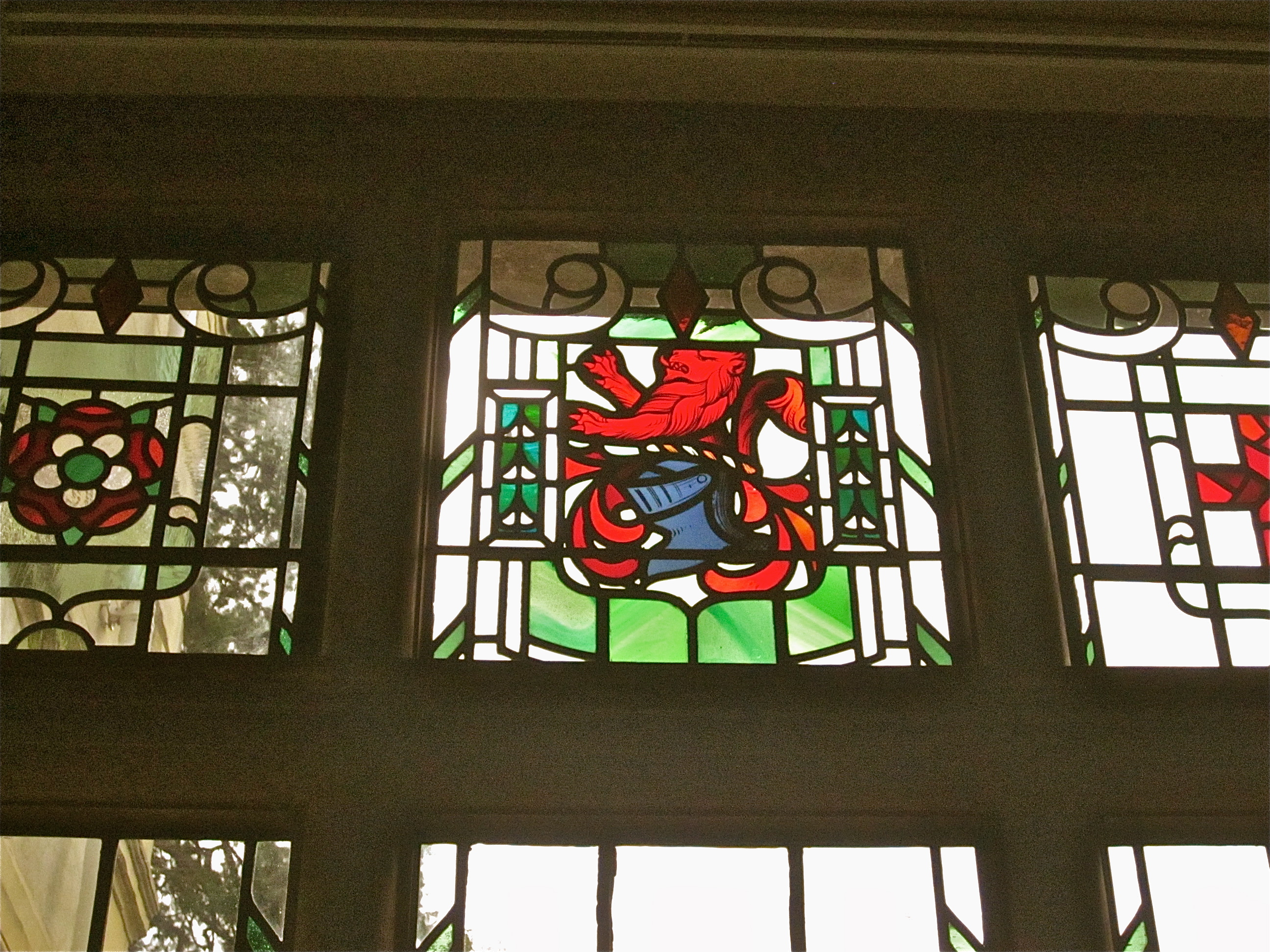
Broneirion, Stained glass in Billiards Room

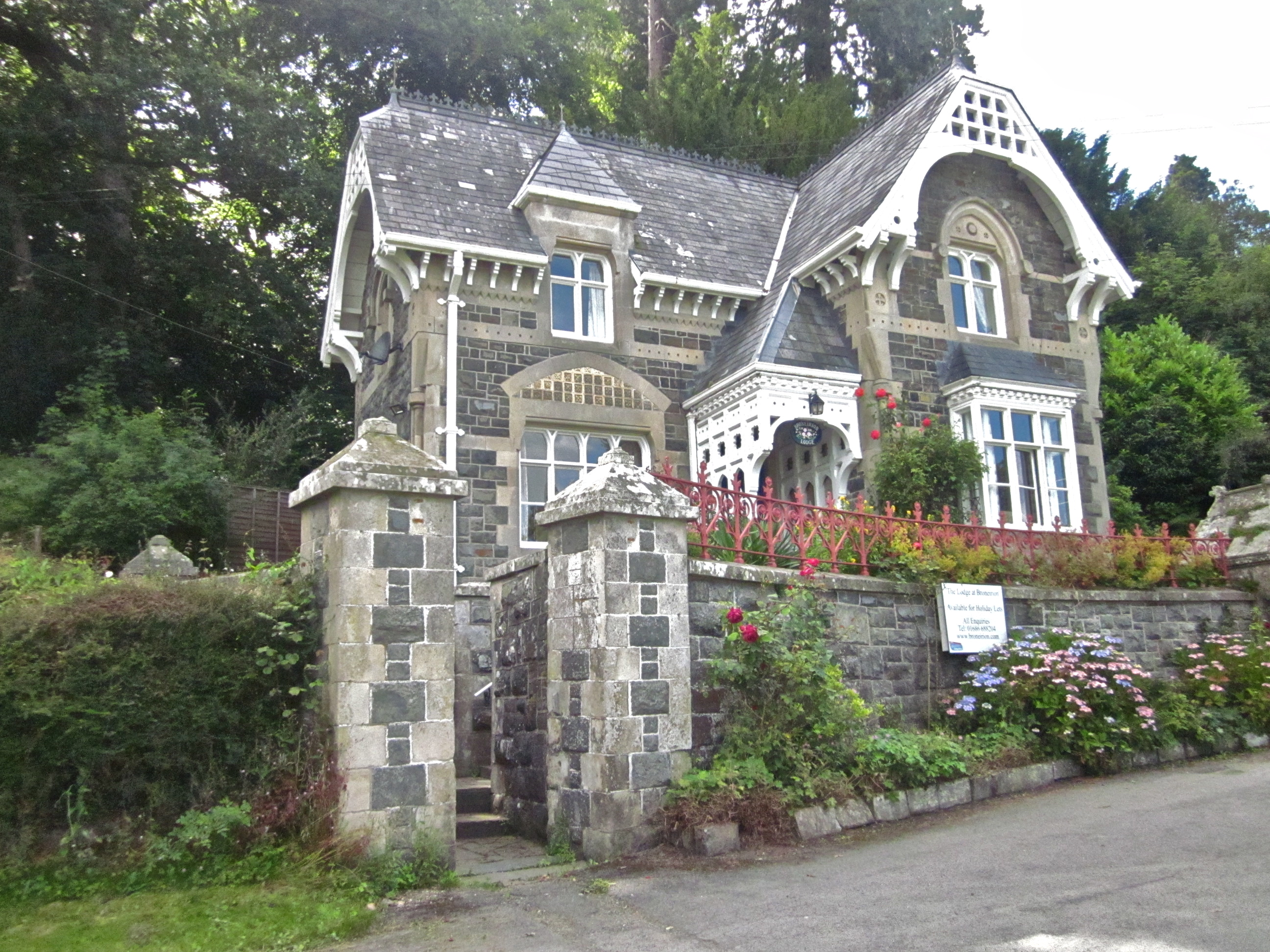
Broneirion, Gate Lodge

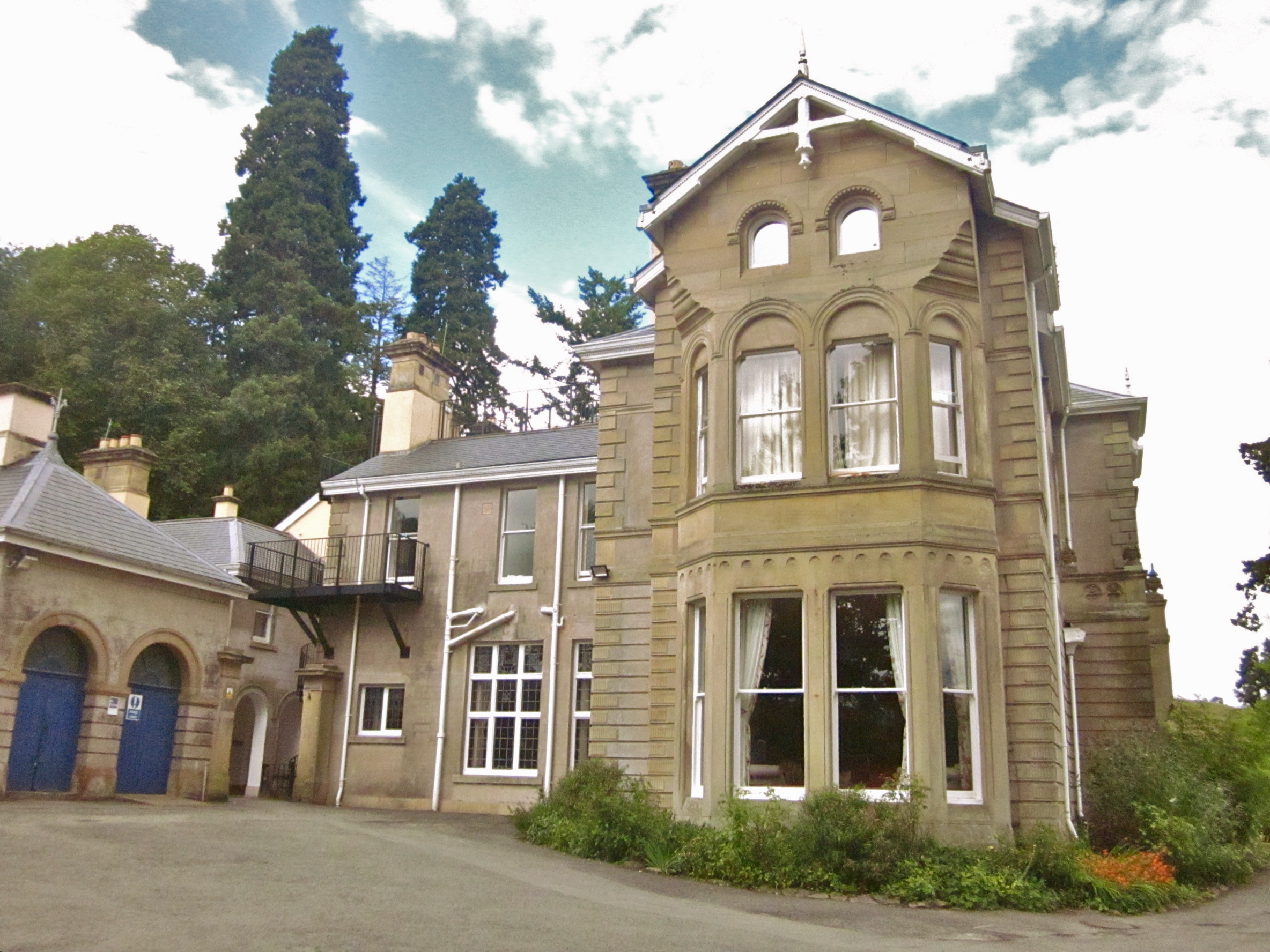
Broneirion, Courtyard gable

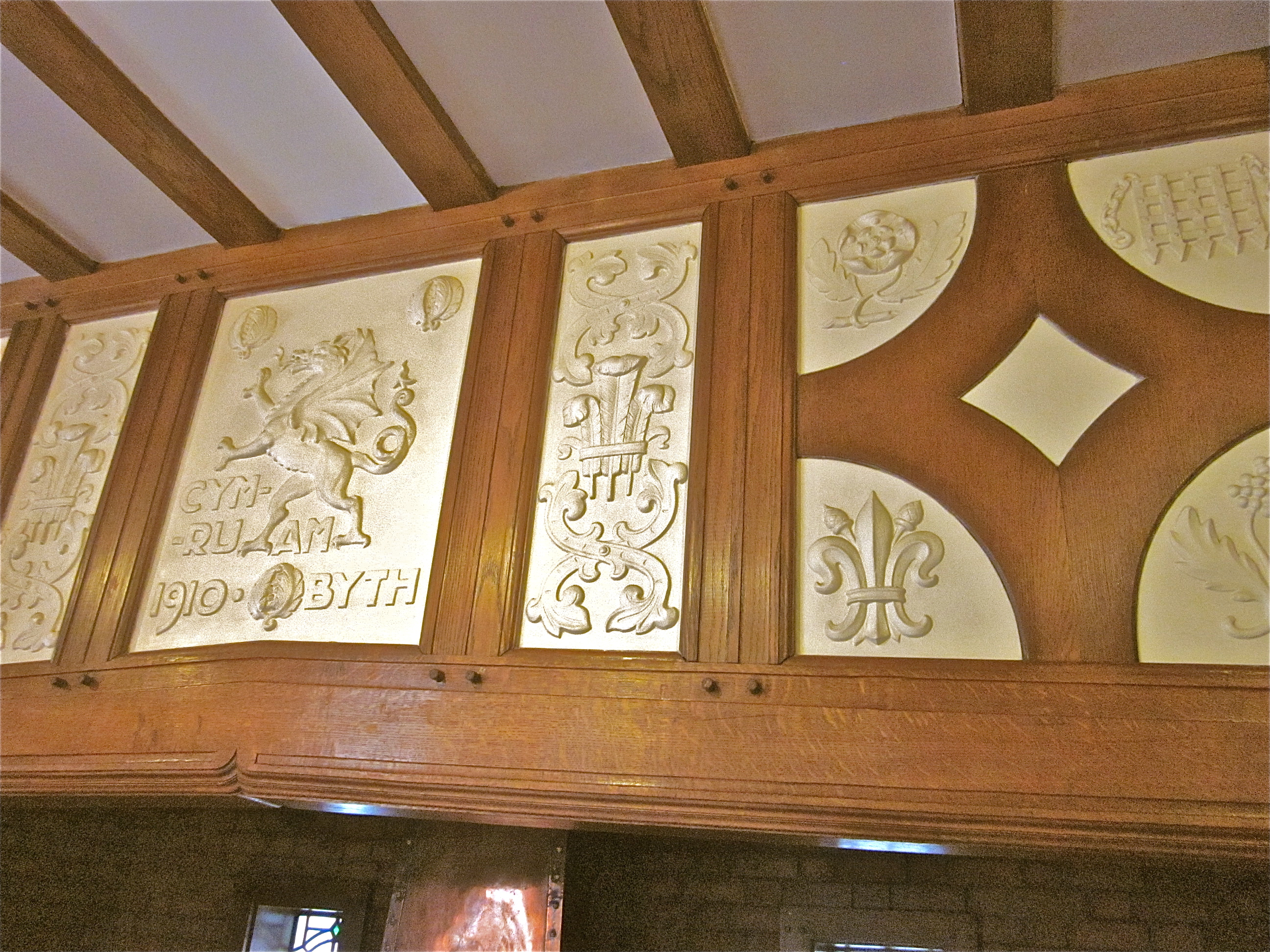
Broneirion, Plasterwork over fireplace in Billiards Room

== See also ==
- Foxlease
