= Tylwch railway station =

Former railway station in Powys, Wales

Tylwch
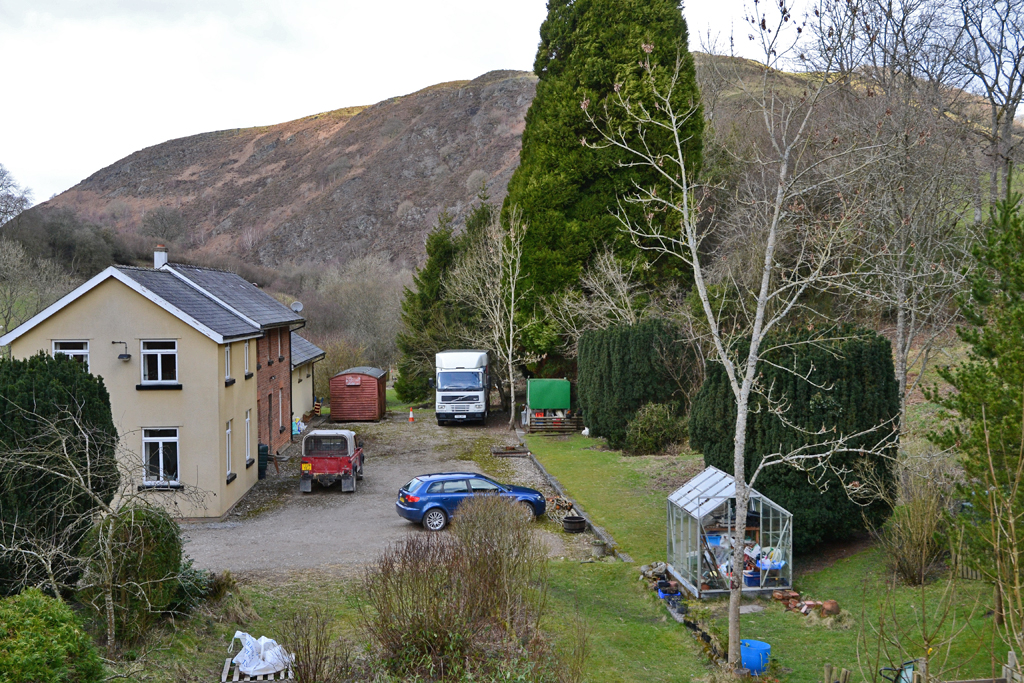
- The former station master's house seen in 2012

General information
- Location: Tylwch, Powys; Wales
- Coordinates: 52.4101°N 3.5155°W
- Grid reference: SN969802
- Platforms: 2

Other information
- Status: Disused

History
- Original company: Mid-Wales Railway
- Pre-grouping: Cambrian Railways
- Post-grouping: Great Western Railway

Key dates
- 1864: Opened
- 1939: Downgraded to halt status
- 1962: Closed
Location

Tylwch railway station was a station in Tylwch, Powys, Wales. The station was closed in 1962.

On 16 September 1899, an accident happened at the station in which a mail train collided with an excursion train. Five people were seriously injured and a 24-year-old woman died in the incident.

Preceding station	Disused railways	Following station
Llanidloes; Line and station closed	Cambrian Railways; Mid-Wales Railway	Glan-yr-Afon Halt; Line and station closed
