= Girlguiding Cymru =

Bysowch Barod Cymru

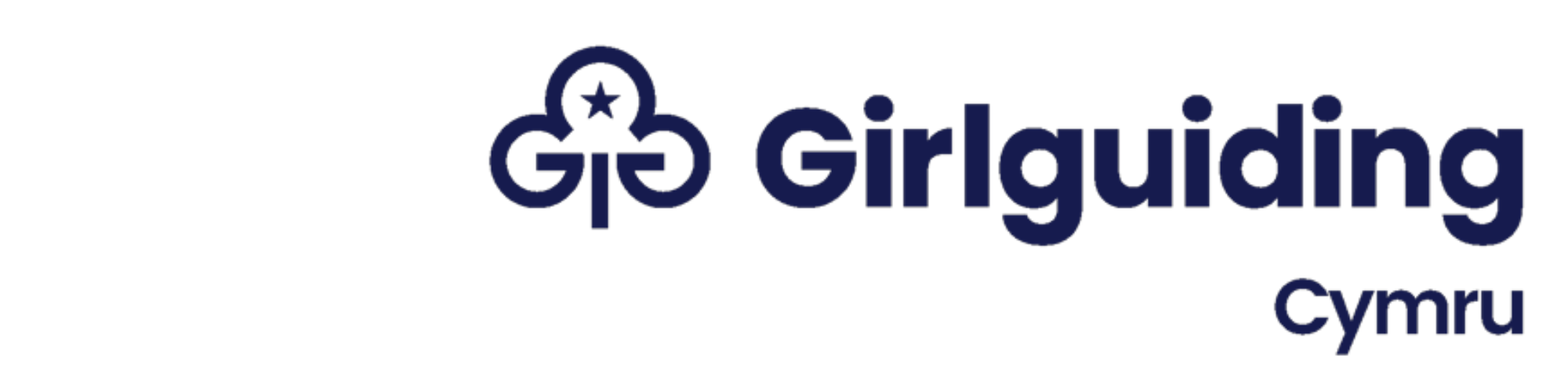
Girlguiding Cymru Logo

Girlguiding Cymru (Welsh: Bysowch Barod Cymru) is one of the nine regions of Girlguiding UK. It serves the approximate area of Wales, although the boundaries are not exact. In 2023, there were 11,000 youth members and over 3,000 volunteers. The chief commissioner of Girlguiding Cymru is Kathy Gunner.

Until 1938 Wales was administered from Headquarters in London. From 1918 to 1938 there were Deputy Chief Commissioners. In 1938 the Council for Wales was formed and a Standing Committee was appointed. Lady Blythswood was appointed Chief Commissioner in the same year.

== Counties ==
Girlguiding Cymru is split into 14 Girlguiding Counties. These counties are broadly based on the historic counties of Wales except that Glamorgan is split into three, Denbighshire and Flintshire are combined into "Clwyd" and Monmouthshire is referred to as "Gwent". Breconshire and Radnorshire are combined into "Cronfa ddŵr"

- Anglesey
- Breconshire
- Caernarfonshire
- Cardiff and East Glamorgan
- Carmarthenshire
- Central Glamorgan
- Ceredigion
- Clwyd
- Gwent
- Merioneth
- Montgomeryshire
- Pembrokeshire
- Radnorshire
- West Glamorgan

== Headquarters ==
Girlguiding Cymru’s headquarters is currently based on New Road in Newtown, Powys

Prior to this, Girlguiding Cymru was headquartered at Broneirion, a historic country house in Llandinam, which had long served as a training and activity centre as well as the administrative base for the organisation.

== Early Guiding in Wales ==
The 1st Carmarthen Company was the first Guide Company to be registered in Wales. Prior to 1910, some girls from Wales were registered as Scouts.

== See also ==
- Scouting in Wales
- The Scout Association
