= List of ironworks in Wales =

This is a list of ironworks that have been established within Wales, United Kingdom. Most were established during the nineteenth century in industrialising Southeast Wales with a smaller number in Northeast Wales, West Wales and elsewhere.

== South Wales ==
- Aberaman Ironworks
- Abercraf Ironworks
- Aberdare Ironworks
- Abernant Ironworks
- Abersychan Ironworks – also known as The British Ironworks
- Banwen Ironworks
- Beaufort Ironworks
- Bedford Ironworks or Cefn Cribwr Ironworks
- Blaenavon Ironworks
- Blaendare Ironworks – see Pontypool Ironworks
- Blaina Ironworks
- Brecon Ironworks
- British Ironworks – see Abersychan Ironworks
- Briton Ferry Ironworks
- Brynamman Ironworks
- Brynna Ironworks
- Bute Ironworks
- Caerphilly Ironworks
- Carmarthen Ironworks
- Cefn Cribwr Ironworks or Bedford Ironworks
- Cefn Cwsc Ironworks
- Clydach Ironworks
- Coalbrookvale Ironworks – see also Trostre Ironworks
- Cwm Celyn Ironworks
- Cwmdu Ironworks (Maesteg)
- Cwm Dyar Ironworks
- Cwmavon Ironworks
- Cwmbran Ironworks
- Cwmffrwdoer Ironworks
- Cyfarthfa Ironworks
- Dowlais Ironworks
- Dyffryn Ironworks
- Ebbw Vale Ironworks
- Gadlys Ironworks
- Garnddyrys Ironworks(despite name not an ironworks but a forge)
- Garth Ironworks (Maesteg)
- Golynos Ironworks
- Gwar-y-coed Ironworks
- Gwendraeth Ironworks
- Hirwaun Ironworks
- Ivor Works
- Kilgetty Ironworks also known as Stepaside Ironworks
- Llanelly Ironworks
- Llechryd Ironworks, Cilgerran
- Llwydcoed Ironworks also known as Aberdare Ironworks
- Llynfi Ironworks
- Maesteg Ironworks
- Melincwrt Ironworks (also known as Melinycwrt Ironworks)
- Millbrook Ironworks, Landore
- Morriston Ironworks
- Nantyglo Ironworks
- Neath Abbey Ironworks
- Oakwood Ironworks
- Old Furnace Ironworks, Llanelli
- Onllwyn Ironworks
- Pembrey Ironworks
- Penrhiwtyn Ironworks, Neath
- Pentrebach Ironworks
- Pentwyn Ironworks
- Pentyrch Ironworks
- Penydarren Ironworks
- Plymouth Ironworks
- Pontardawe Ironworks
- Pontnewynydd Ironworks
- Pont-y-gwaith Ironworks
- Pontypool Ironworks – see also known as Blaendare Ironworks, Race Ironworks
- Race Ironworks – see Pontypool Ironworks
- Rhymney Ironworks
- Rudry Ironworks
- Sirhowy Ironworks
- Stepaside Ironworks or Kilgetty Ironworks
- Stuart Ironworks – a later name for Hirwaun Ironworks
- Tintern Ironworks
- Tondu Ironworks
- Tredegar Ironworks
- Treforest Ironworks
- Trimsaran Ironworks
- Trostre Ironworks – see also Coalbrookvale Ironworks
- Union Ironworks
- Varteg Ironworks or Varteg Hill Ironworks
- Venallt Ironworks
- Victoria Ironworks
- Whitland Abbey Ironworks
- Ynyscedwyn Ironworks
- Ynys Fach Ironworks or Ynysfach Ironworks
- Ystalyfera Ironworks

== North Wales ==
- Bersham Ironworks
- Brymbo Ironworks
- Dewinton Ironworks or Union Ironworks, Caernarfon
- Ffrwd Ironworks
- Hawarden Ironworks
- Mostyn Ironworks
- Union Ironworks or Dewinton Ironworks, Caernarfon
