= Tylwch =

Coordinates: 52.412265°N 3.517978°W

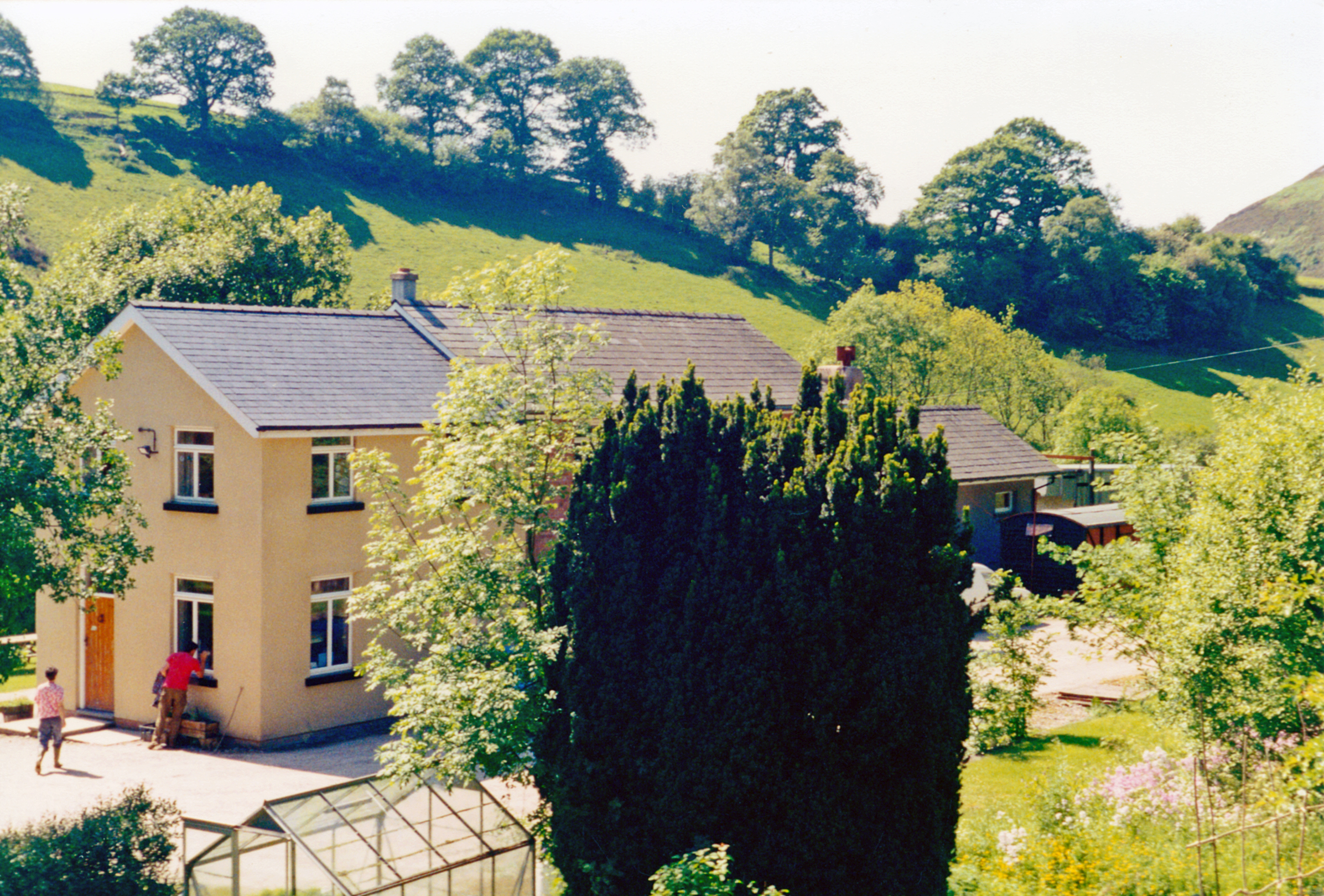
- Former railway station in Tylwch

- Location within Powys
- OS grid reference: SN968804
- Principal area: Powys
- Preserved county: Powys
- Country: Wales
- Sovereign state: United Kingdom
- Post town: LLANIDLOES
- Postcode district: SY18
- Dialling code: 01686
- Police: Dyfed-Powys
- Fire: Mid and West Wales
- Ambulance: Welsh
- UK Parliament: Montgomeryshire and Glyndŵr
- Senedd Cymru – Welsh Parliament: Montgomeryshire

Tylwch is a small village in Powys, Wales.

Tylwch lies south of the principal town of Llanidloes on the border of Montgomeryshire and Radnorshire. It lies on the Afon Dulas, which once serviced a local woolen mill. Other early industries included West Fedw, a now disused lead mine. Tylwch was once home to Tylwch railway station, which closed in 1962. In 1899 the station was the scene of an accident which witnessed a collision between a mail train and an excursion train. Five people were seriously injured and a 24-year-old woman died.
