= Llandinam =

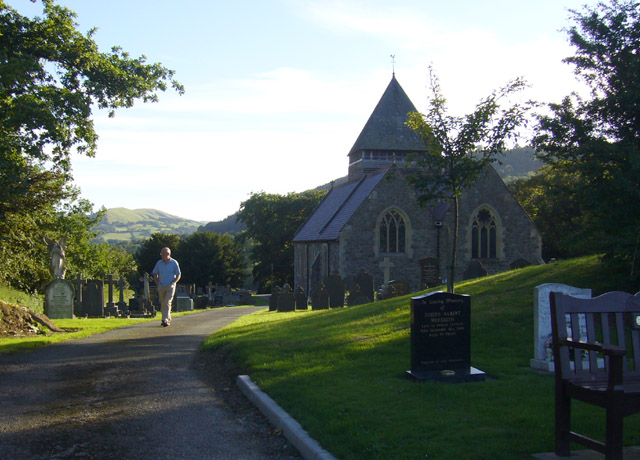
- St Llonio's Church

- Location within Powys
- Population: 911 (2011)
- OS grid reference: SO028881
- Principal area: Powys
- Preserved county: Powys
- Country: Wales
- Sovereign state: United Kingdom
- Post town: Llandinam
- Postcode district: SY17
- Post town: Llanidloes
- Postcode district: SY18
- Dialling code: 01686
- Police: Dyfed-Powys
- Fire: Mid and West Wales
- Ambulance: Welsh
- UK Parliament: Montgomeryshire and Glyndŵr
- Senedd Cymru – Welsh Parliament: Montgomeryshire
- List of places UK Wales Powys 52.484°N 3.434°W Community map: Map of the community

Llandinam (Welsh pronunciation) is a village and community in Montgomeryshire, Powys, central Wales, between Newtown and Llanidloes, located on the A470. As a community, Llandinam is made up of the village itself, small hamlets including Plas Dinam and Little London and several farms. The village itself has a population of around 576, with 56% born in Wales.

== History and notable people ==
Llandinam was the family home of David Davies (1818–1890) who was responsible for much of the development of the South Wales Valleys and the export of coal in the 19th century. His grandson David Davies, 1st Baron Davies FRGS (1880–1944) became MP for Montgomeryshire from 1906 to 1929.

The parents of Murray Humphreys (1899–1965), one of Chicago's most feared Prohibition gangsters, emigrated to the United States from the village in the late 1890s.

Gordonstoun school was evacuated here for the duration of World War II. The village was served by Llandinam railway station on the Llanidloes and Newtown Railway until its closure in the 1960s.

== Governance ==
An electoral ward in the same name existed, which also covered the neighbouring community of Mochdre. The population of this ward at the 2011 census was 1,405. It elected its first Conservative County Councillor in May 2017. From the 2022 local election, the Llandinam ward became 'Llandinam and Dolfor', following the merger with part of the neighbouring Kerry community. It continued to be represented by one county councillor.

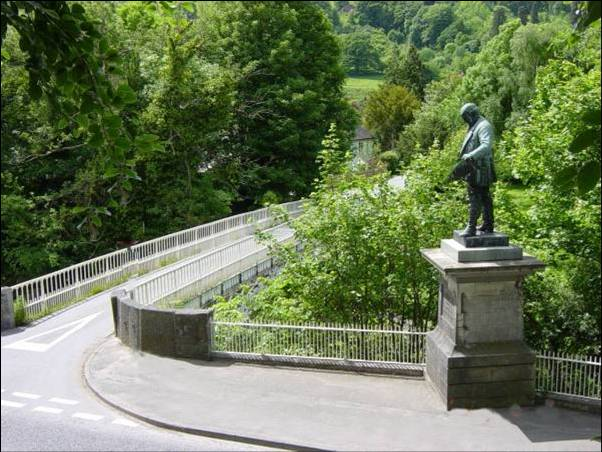
Statue of David Davies

== Notable buildings ==
=== St Llonio's Church ===
St Llonio's Church is located north of the village, on a spur of land jutting into the Severn Valley, and within a fortified promontory fort. It was originally the mother church of those at Llanidloes and Llanwnnog, serving a monastery until the late 13th century. The church is thought to date from around AD 520. It was initially a clas structure. Its tower has a pyramidal slate roof over a timber belfry, dating from the 13th century. It is recorded as Ecclesia de Landinam in the Norwich Taxation of 1254 with a value of £1 6s 8d. The majority of the church was rebuilt in the 19th century, a restoration undertaken by George Edmund Street. The church still retains some original features, however, most notably the northern wall of the chancel. During the restoration, new windows were installed in a neo-Gothic style. The churchyard contains a number of old trees, principally oaks and yews, including one of the latter which is claimed to be around 800 years old. The churchyard contains the war graves of three Royal Welsh Fusiliers soldiers of World War I.

The church, which is a Grade II listed building, is in the Church in Wales parish of Bro Arwystli.

=== Llandinam Bridge ===
The bridge from the main road over towards Broneirion was the first cast iron bridge constructed in the county, designed by Thomas Penson and built by Davies 1846. It spans 90 feet (27.5 m). At the east end of the bridge there is a statue of David Davies.

=== Broneirion ===
The house that David Davies built, Broneirion, remains an elegant country mansion owned by Girlguiding Cymru.

=== Plâs Dinam ===
Plâs Dinam was bought by David Davies for his son, Edward. Designed by William Eden Nesfield in 1873-1874, it is a Grade II* listed building. Its garden is listed at Grade II on the Cadw/ICOMOS Register of Parks and Gardens of Special Historic Interest in Wales.
