= Llanidloes and Newtown Railway =

Welsh transport company

The Llanidloes and Newtown Railway (L&NR) was a railway company between Llanidloes and Newtown in Montgomeryshire, Wales. It was promoted locally when plans for trunk railways passing through the locality were cancelled; local people saw that a railway connection was essential to the flannel industry in the district. The 17-mile (27 km) line opened in 1859, and at first was isolated from any other railway, but from 1861 it became connected to Oswestry by an allied railway company, and other companies also connected to it. From 1864 the company was incorporated into the new Cambrian Railways company.

Serving a thinly populated and remote area, the line was never commercially successful, and the long-distance through routes passing through did not succeed in bringing great traffic volumes to the line. When Llanidloes station was to be extended and improved, the Manchester and Milford Railway (M&MR), then under construction, undertook to pay a one-third share of the cost of the works, and of future maintenance and operation of the station. The M&MR later decided to alter the course of its line and never reached Llanidloes, but continued to be liable for heavy charges for a station it did not connect with.

Major route closures took place in the region in the 1960s, but a portion of the L&NR, from Newtown to Moat Lane, continues in use, carrying passenger trains on the Shrewsbury to Aberystwyth line.

== Before the Llanidloes and Newtown Railway ==
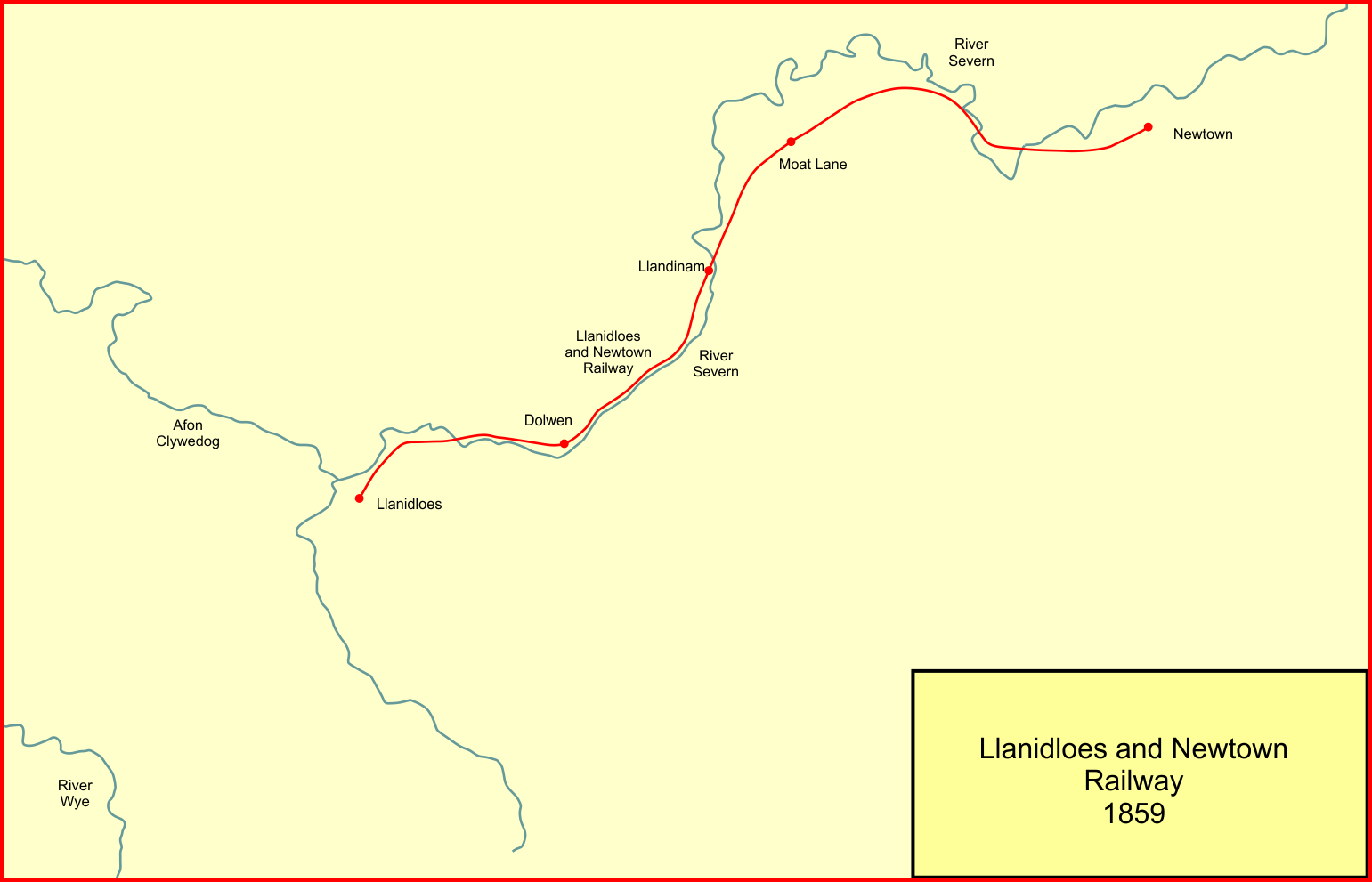
The Llanidloes and Newtown Railway in 1859

At the end of the eighteenth century, the local industry of Mid Wales was already fairly well provided with canals, although the mountainous terrain made their engineering difficult. After 1830 attention was being given to railway communication with Ireland and a royal commission was established in 1836 to enquire into the matter. Charles Blacker Vignoles reported in 1837 on his recommended route to reach Dublin, which was to use a natural harbour at Porthdinllaen on the north coast of the Llŷn Peninsula. Vignoles proposed a railway route to Porthdinllaen from Shrewsbury via Oswestry, Chirk, Bala, Barmouth, Harlech, and Pwllheli, although a route similar to the present Chester – Holyhead route was considered, and rejected.

Isambard Kingdom Brunel was considering a London to Dublin route at the same time, and he too favoured Porthdinllaen as a ferry port. His line would have been 7 ft 1/4 in (2,140 mm) broad gauge and run from Ludlow through Craven Arms, Montgomery and Newtown. However at this stage these schemes were merely proposals and had not achieved traction in gaining financial commitment. In fact George Stephenson, favouring the easier gradients of the Chester to Holyhead line, was persuasive, and when the Chester and Holyhead Railway was authorised on 4 July 1844, any scheme for Porthdinllaen was futile.

In 1852 a further proposal was published, for a Montgomeryshire Railways Company; it would run from Shrewsbury through Minsterley (rather than Welshpool), Newtown, Llanidloes and Llangurig to Aberystwyth. The London and North Western Railway, by now dominant in North Wales, took over the scheme but altered the route avoiding Llanidloes, and in fact the western part of this scheme was dropped before it went before Parliament.

== Llanidloes and Newtown Railway proposed ==
Llanidloes and Newtown Railways Act 1853
- Act of Parliament
- Parliament of the United Kingdom
- Long title: An Act for making a Railway from Llanidloes in the County of Montgomery to Newtown in the same County, to be called the Llanidloes and Newtown Railway; and for other Purposes.
- Citation: 16 & 17 Vict. c. cxliii

Dates
- Royal assent: 4 August 1853

Text of statute as originally enacted

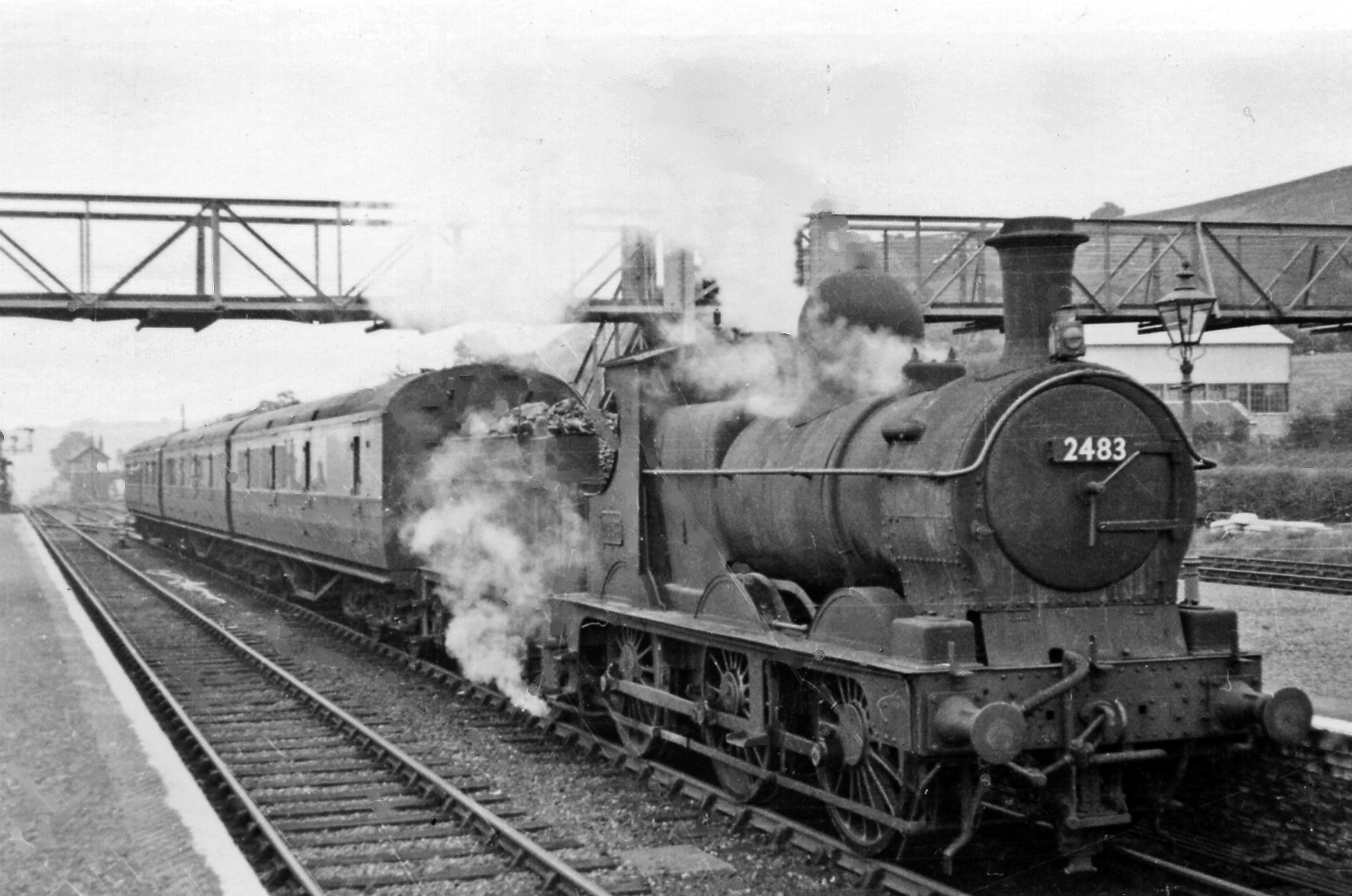
A southbound train at Llanidloes station

There was considerable disappointment in Llanidloes, that the town was now to be passed by, and much interest was shown in building their own line to Newtown, where a connection would be made with the Montgomeryshire line when it was built. A meeting was held at Llanidloes on 30 October 1852 under the chairmanship of George Hammond Whalley MP. A prospectus was approved: capital of £60,000 would be needed to build the line, and annual receipts were estimated at £8,250, offering a dividend of 7 per cent. The route was surveyed by Rice Hopkins. The bill went forward to the 1853 parliamentary session. Serious errors in Hopkins’ levels were exposed, but the scheme was quickly rectified and the Llanidloes and Newtown Railways Act 1853 (16 & 17 Vict. c. cxliii) was passed on 4 August 1853.

== Authorisation and construction ==
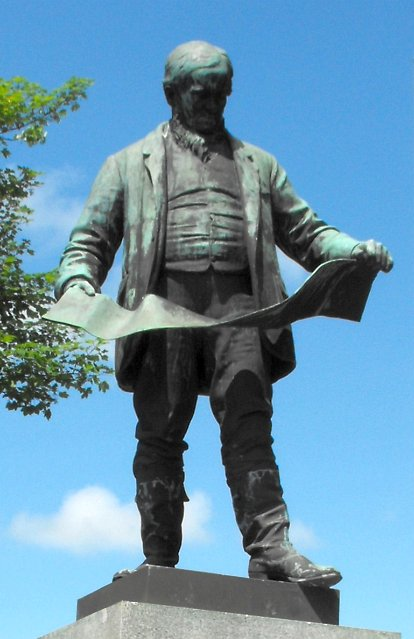
Statue of David Davies at Llandinam

The Llanidloes and Newtown Railway received its authorising act of Parliament, the Llanidloes and Newtown Railways Act 1853 (16 & 17 Vict. c. cxliii), on 4 August 1853. Commercial prospects seemed excellent; Whalley was elected chairman. The authorisation led to a period of elation within the company, and immediately a long extension line to Shrewsbury was suggested. However, the new company quickly found great difficulty in raising subscriptions to build its own line. It was not until September 1855 that the first construction contract was awarded; that went to David Davies of Llandinam. In time Davies became prominent in construction and mining in Wales. Soon Davies got the contract for the whole line; he took into partnership Thomas Savin of Llwyn-y-maen.

The original plan was for a double-track line but this was amended to single-track, with bridges built for later doubling.

Llanidloes and Newtown Railway (Canal Extension) Act 1859
- Act of Parliament
- Parliament of the United Kingdom
- Long title: An Act to authorize the Construction of a Tramway from the Llanidloes and Newtown Railway near Newtown to the Shropshire Union Canal; and to enable the Llanidloes and Newtown Railway Company to lease their Undertaking; and for other Purposes.
- Citation: 22 & 23 Vict. c. xxx

Dates
- Royal assent: 21 July 1859

Some progress was made with construction, but by the end of 1857 all available money had been expended and work stopped, and Davies and Savin were working elsewhere. Early in 1859, Davies and Savin offered to finish the line, in exchange for all unissued shares and debentures, on paper a 25 per cent rise on the original contract value, and to lease and work the line. The chairman was against acceptance, but a committee of shareholders considered that there was no realistic alternative, and voted in favour. The lease was incorporated into the 21 July 1859 Llanidloes and Newtown Railway (Canal Extension) Act 1859 (22 & 23 Vict. c. xxx). (The proposed canal extension was to be a short tramway to the Shropshire Union Canal basin at Newtown, but it was never built.)

The railway construction was resumed with the excavation of Scafell cutting. The company engineer was now Benjamin Piercy of Trefeglwys, as Rice Hopkins had died.

== Opening ==
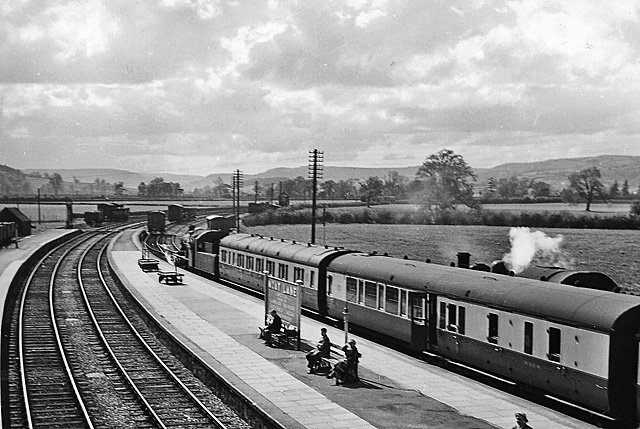
Moat Lane Junction Station in 1957

The line was finished to a temporary terminus at Newtown, and goods trains started running on 30 April 1859. The company was not in a position to operate passenger trains for some time; the necessary Board of Trade approval was received on 6 or 9 August and passenger train operation started on 2 September 1859. (Note: Earlier sources quote 2 September 1859; but Quick has done more recent research and gives 11 August 1859, explaining that the 2 September date probably resulted from a previous source assuming that the public opening followed the formal. In reality, the formal opening was later, on 31 August. Some newspapers described that as the opening and gave no mention of the earlier use.) These were the first passenger trains to run in mid-Wales. Intermediate stations were at Dolwen, Llandinam and Caersws, and working of the single line was by timetable. There was no intermediate crossing place.

Four locomotives were ordered from Sharp, Stewart and Company of Manchester to work the 12-mile (19 km) line, and Davies and Savin used other engines for the construction. The first, Dove, reached Llandinam in 1857. It was brought by road from Oswestry on a special road wagon pulled by 14 horses. Dove was probably a second hand Sharp, Roberts 2-2-2 locomotive acquired from the Birmingham and Derby Junction Railway. It was followed by locomotives named Squirrel, Llewellyn and Enterprise. At this stage the L&NR was isolated and all stores were carried by canal to Newtown and carted across the town to the station.

== Connecting railways ==
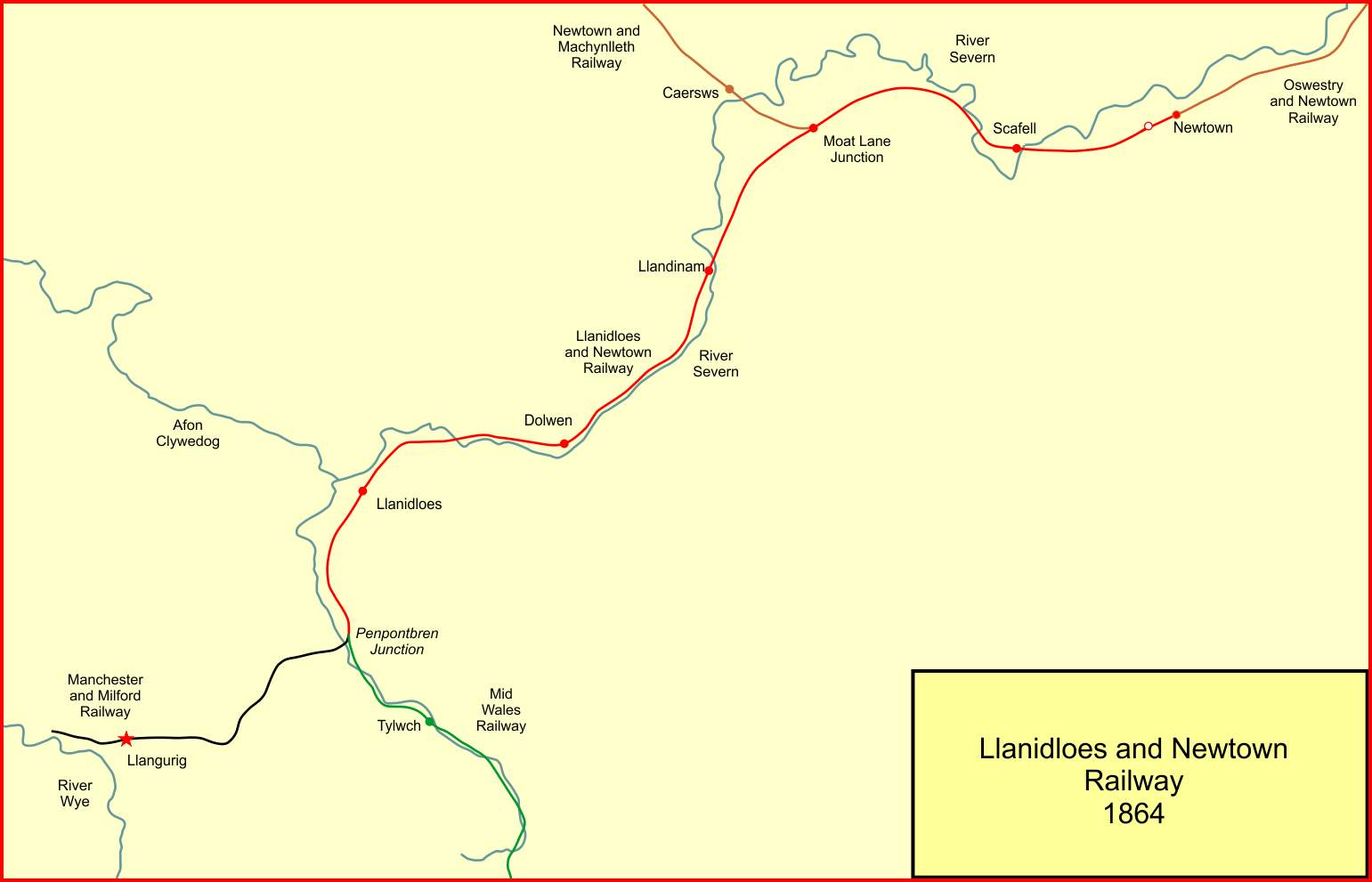
The Llanidloes and Newtown Railway in 1864

The isolated state of the L&NR was not to last for long; the Oswestry and Newtown Railway opened on 10 June 1861, connecting the Llanidloes and Newtown Railway to the rest of the railway network via Oswestry and the Great Western Railway. The Newtown and Machynlleth Railway followed, opening on 3 January 1863, running westward from Moat Lane Junction, so that the southern (Llanidloes) end of the L&NR was now a spur branch line. The existing Moat Lane station (Caersws) was closed and replaced by one nearer Newtown, at the junction at Moat Lane. From 14 August 1860 Llandloes and Newtown Railway trains ran through to Abermule, on the Oswestry and Newtown Railway.

== Southward connections ==
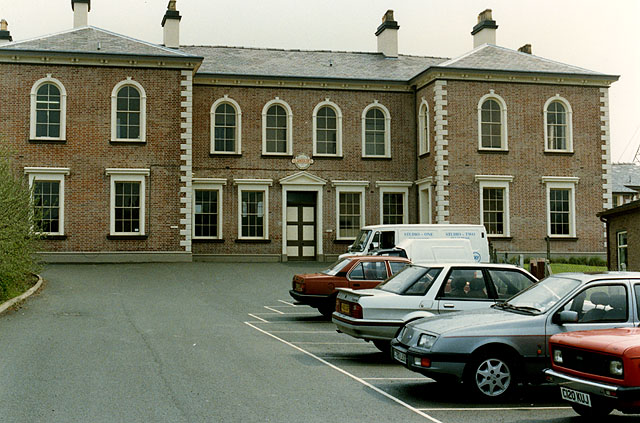
Llanidloes Station in 1990

Llanidloes was now the southern termination of the lines in the area, but two ambitious schemes to connect to Llanidloes were in hand. On 1 August 1859, the Mid-Wales Railway was authorised by the Mid-Wales Railway Act 1859 (22 & 23 Vict. c. lxiii). This scheme had been radically cut back during the parliamentary hearings; only a few months previously its promoters called it "the Mid-Wales section of the Manchester, Liverpool, Swansea & Milford Haven Junction Railway," but it was authorised from Llanidloes as far as Newbridge-on-Wye only, passing through Rhayader. The authorised line was not what the Mid-Wales proprietors wanted, and in 1860 they returned to Parliament. This time they were more successful, and the Mid Wales Railway (Extensions) Act 1860 (23 & 24 Vict. c. cxxxiii) was passed on 3 July 1860. This confirmed the previous year's approval, and extended it to Three Cocks, giving access to Brecon and Merthyr.

Later that month, on 23 July 1860, the Manchester and Milford Railway was authorised to build a line south from Llanidloes through Strata Florida, Tregaron and Lampeter to Pencader. Unnoticed at the time was that the authorised route southward out of Llanidloes was nearly identical for the Mid-Wales Railway and the Manchester and Milford Railway.

Llanidloes and Newtown (Mid Wales and Manchester and Milford) Railway Act 1862
- Act of Parliament
- Parliament of the United Kingdom
- Long title: An Act for authorizing the Llanidloes and Newtown Railway Company to make and maintain a Line of Railway for the joint Use of the Mid Wales Railway Company and the Manchester and Milford Railway Company, and a Station at Llanidloes for the joint Use of the Three Companies, and to raise further Monies; and for other Purposes.
- Citation: 25 & 26 Vict. c. clxii

Dates
- Royal assent: 17 July 1862

Text of statute as originally enacted

After some argumentation, this difficulty was resolved by the Llanidloes and Newtown Railway undertaking to build the duplicated section of line, granting running powers over the line to both companies, and, it hoped, to build a joint station at Llanidloes. This was authorised by the Llanidloes and Newtown (Mid Wales and Manchester and Milford) Railway Act 1862 (25 & 26 Vict. c. clxii) of 17 July 1862. The point of divergence of the two routes was near Penpontbren Farm, nearly two miles (3 km) south of Llanidloes station. The Manchester and Milford Railway constructed its line from the southern extremity, northwards, and the process was slow due to money shortages. The Mid-Wales Railway too was subject to cash problems, but most of its line from Penpontbren to Rhayader was made ready by March 1863, despite the difficult terrain.

The Works by this Act authorized comprise the following Line of Railway and Station, with all proper and sufficient Sidings, Approaches, Yards, Buildings, Works, and Conveniences connected therewith; (that is to say,)

- First, the Joint Line, being a Line of Railway commencing at the Passenger Station at Llanidloes, and terminating at or near to Penpontbren by Junctions there with the authorized Lines of Railway of the Mid Wales Company and the Milford Company respectively:
- Secondly, a Joint Station at Llanidloes.
— Section 12, Llanidloes and Newtown (Mid Wales and Manchester and Milford) Railway Act 1862 (25 & 26 Vict. c. clxii)

Meanwhile the Llanidloes and Newtown Railway progressed with its Llanidloes to Penpontbren section; this was made with two single lines, the eastern for the Mid-Wales Railway, and the western for the Manchester and Milford Railway. Captain Tyler approved the section for the Board of Trade in January 1864. The Manchester and Milford Railway which was still building far to the south west, but when it should eventually reach Penpontbren a full double junction would have to be made there. Early in 1864 the through station built at Llanidloes in readiness for the opening of the Mid-Wales Railway to Brecon was completed and the L&NR used this station and closed its old terminus to passenger use.

Belatedly the M&MR made a start in building from Penpontbren. Its contractor finished the work between Penpontbren and Llangurig ("and half a mile beyond"), a distance of a little over three miles (5 km) from Penpontbren, in February 1864. In that month, an M&MR goods train reached Llangurig. Most of the Mid-Wales Railway was opened on 23 August 1864. The Mid-Wales Railway and the Manchester and Milford Railway were obliged by the agreement to pay 5% interest on the L&NR construction cost of the line to Penpontbren. Moreover the new station at Llanidloes was to be joint between the three companies, with operating and maintenance cost, as well as interest at 5% on construction cost, shared equally between them.

Holden portrays this from the M&MR's point of view:

...the L. & N. had taken the opportunity presented by the cost-sharing agreement and the Act of 1862 to build itself an unnecessarily extravagant station, whose main building stands to this day [1979], a gaunt reminder dominating the outskirts of the town. So while the joint line cost £16,000, outlay on the station amounted to more than £20,000.

In February 1864 the M&MR was reviewing its strategy. The most difficult construction was yet to be made, and Newtown was beginning to appear an unattractive destination. Construction of the M&MR had reached Strata Florida, and the company made the decision to turn west from there, to reach Aberystwyth instead, abandoning the plan to reach Llangurig, and abandoning its two miles (3 km) of completed line there. The M&MR was nevertheless committed to pay its one-third of the operating cost and interest charges for the Llanidloes station, even though it now had no intention of reaching Llanidloes. In addition the M&MR had to pay their share of the Penpontbren signalmen's wages. The situation was only resolved when the Great Western Railway leased the M&MR in 1911.

The track provided for the M&MR from Llanidloes to Penpontbren was unused for many years, until in July 1872 Penpontbren Junction was commissioned, the section now working as a double line. In 1879 all traffic worked over the down line, for reasons not recorded. The Llangurig branch, as it had become, was lifted in 1882, with a short section of the branch being retained as a siding.

Christiansen has a slightly different account:

The Penpontbren section, finished by February 1864, was double, but only the down line was ever used. This agreed with the original intention, which was to double the line only when the L&NR was doubled. From Penpontbren the M&MR turned west for three miles [5 km] to the village of Llangurig, sheltered under the Plynlimon range. This section was ready and signalled by February 1864 and earthworks were also completed for a short distance beyond the village.

Apart from contractors' trains, only one goods train ever reached Llangurig. Money had run out: not surprisingly since by 31 December 1863 only £7,953 had been raised by the M&MR against its authorised capital of £666,000. To conquer the mountains beyond Llangurig a spectacular line was planned with two tunnels totalling one and a half miles [2.4 km] and a viaduct 280 ft [85 m] high. Although a tunnel was started, work soon stopped.

== Consolidation ==
This multitude of small independent railway companies in the area was hardly sustainable, and amalgamation was agreed. By the Cambrian Railways Act 1864 (27 & 28 Vict. c. cclxii), the Cambrian Railways company was created, formed of the Llanidloes and Newtown Railway, with three more of the five railways forming the main line: the Oswestry and Newtown Railway, the Newtown and Machynlleth Railway, and the Oswestry, Ellesmere and Whitchurch Railway. A fifth line, the Aberystwith and Welsh Coast Railway joined the consortium just over a year later.

== Decline ==
The Mid-Wales Railway served a thinly-populated rural area, and its operational costs were increasing at a time when income was declining. When the Mid-Wales line closed, the portion of the Llanidloes and Newtown Railway between Moat Lane Junction and Llanidloes closed too, for all traffic with one exception, on 30 December 1962. The single exception was cement traffic from Aberthaw to Llanidloes, for use in constructing the dam for Clywedog Reservoir, three miles (5 km) west of Llanidloes. This traffic continued until 2 October 1967, when that part of the line closed.

== Traction ==
The original L&NR locomotives were of the 0-4-2 tender type, built by Sharp in 1859–60. Nothing is known of Llewelyn, which was the property of Davies and Savin, but Milford was an 0-4-2 saddle tank built by Sharps in 1859 for them. In Cambrian days, various Cambrian engines were drafted in, and later the GWR Dean Goods was used on the line. Under British Railways, the two- and three-coach passenger trains were worked by ex-LMS 2-6-0s. Occasionally BR standard 2-6-0 engines appeared on trains proceeding only as far as Llanidloes, to which (from Moat Lane) the route classification was "yellow".

== Train service ==
The original passenger timetable for the line showed four trains each way, weekdays only, taking 35 minutes for the journey. After the line had been opened to Aberystwyth, this was increased to five trains, with two on Sundays. The 1910 timetable showed a service of nine trains a day. There were still nine trains (one of these being a school train) in 1960, with no Sunday service.

Although the trains were well patronised compared with many lines in Mid-Wales, the Western Region of British Railways applied for permission to close the line completely. This was rejected, but the passenger service from Moat Lane to Brecon was withdrawn (together with all freight services south of Llanidloes) from 31 December 1962.

The section between Newtown and Moat Lane Junction remains in use as part of the Shrewsbury to Aberystwyth line. Although Newtown station remains open, this was not part of the L&NR system, but was on the Oswestry and Newtown Railway.

== Locations ==
- Newtown; opened 11 August 1859; replaced by new station near centre of town on through Oswestry and Newtown line 10 June 1861 when the O&NR was opened; (Note: This is incorrectly shown on Cobb's map, which follows an error in CR Clinker, Clinker's Register of Closed Passenger Stations, Avon-Anglia, 1988 edition) still open;
- Scafell; opened by May 1863; closed 1 July 1891; reopened as Scafell Halt 9 June 1913, for eastbound trains only; the line had been doubled and no westbound platform was provided; closed in 1952 or 7 March 1955.
- Moat Lane; second station; opened 5 January 1863; renamed Moat Lane Junction 1904; closed 31 December 1962; many sources use the name Moat Lane, but Christiansen and Miller call it Caersws;
- Moat Lane; first station; opened 11 August 1859; closed 5 January 1863;
- Llandinam; opened 11 August 1859; closed 31 December 1962;
- Dolwen; opened 11 August 1859; became halt in 1957; closed 31 December 1962;
- Llanidloes; opened 11 August 1859; relocated a short distance southwest by January 1862, when the line was extended to a joint station; closed 31 December 1962;
- Penpontbren Junction; end-on junction with Mid-Wales Railway, former junction with Llangurig branch.

== Gradients ==
The line is undulating from Newtown to the approach to Moat Lane Junction. From there it climbed steadily at about 1 in 225 all the way to Llanidloes, but with about 5/8 mile (1 km) of 1 in 132 between Dolwen and Llanidloes.
