= Llanidloes railway station =

Former railway station in Wales

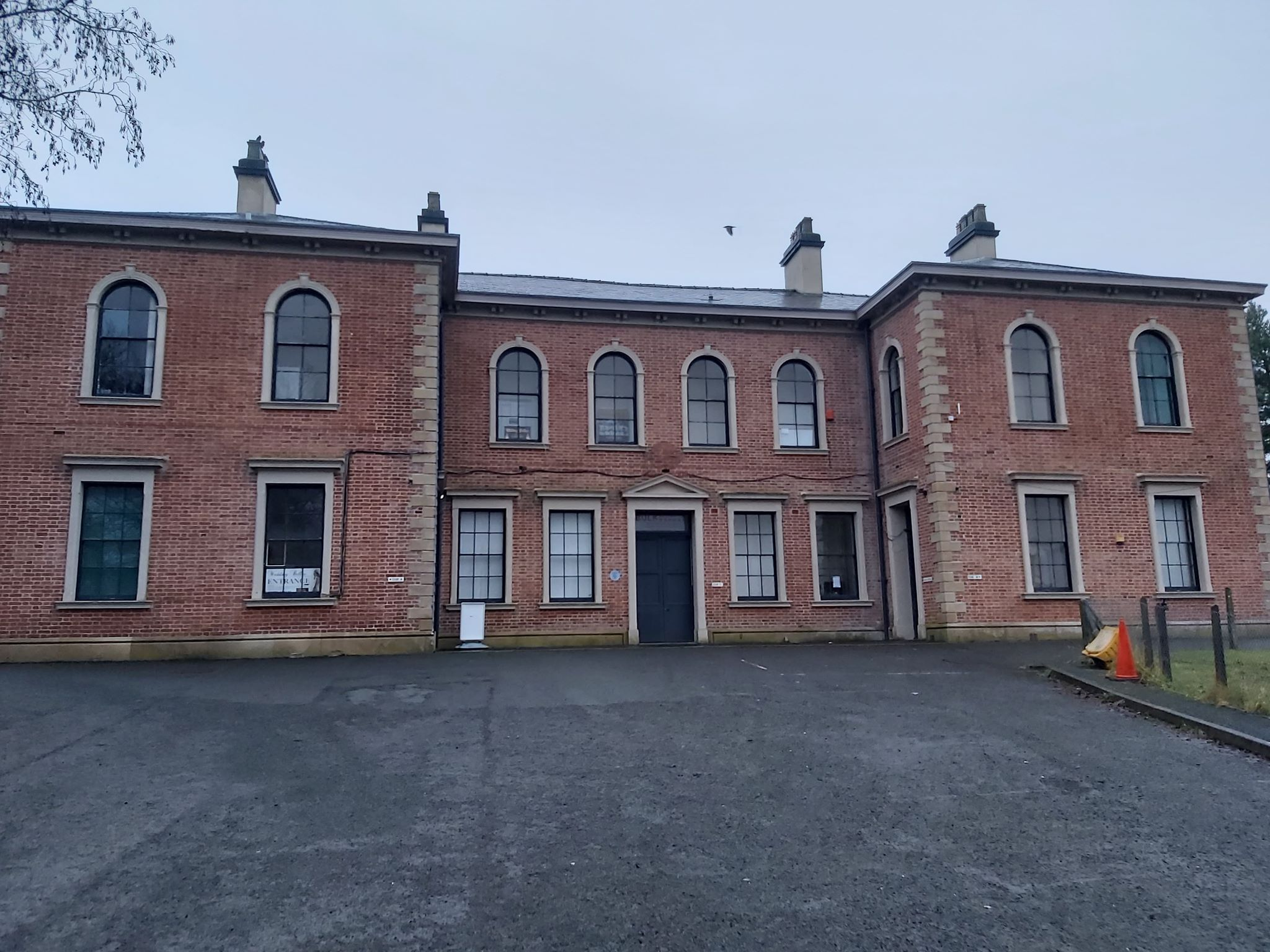
- Llanidloes station in 2019, now in use for a wedding planners

General information
- Location: Llanidloes, Powys; Wales
- Coordinates: 52.4473°N 3.5357°W
- Grid reference: SN956844
- Platforms: 4

Other information
- Status: Disused

History
- Original company: Llanidloes and Newtown Railway
- Pre-grouping: Cambrian Railways
- Post-grouping: Great Western Railway

Key dates
- 1864: Station opened
- 31 December 1962: Station closed

Listed Building – Grade II
- Feature: Former Railway Station
- Designated: 4 June 1974
- Reference no.: 8224
Location

Llanidloes railway station is a former junction railway station in Llanidloes, Powys, Wales. The Cambrian Railways, which completed the building in 1864, designed it to be both the station for the town and its company headquarters. This dual purpose gave Llanidloes station an imposing appearance.

The station closed to passengers in 1962. The rest of the line was abandoned in 1967. The trackbed has been redeveloped as a bypass carrying traffic around Llanidloes town centre. The former station building has been restored and is now a business centre.

== History ==
Llanidloes development into a major junction station arose because of the rapid and chaotic growth of the Victorian railway network in Great Britain. In 1859, the Mid-Wales Railway (MWR) had received Mid-Wales Railway Act 1859 (22 & 23 Vict. c. lxiii) giving them permission to build and run a railway from Newtown to Brecon via Builth Wells and then on to Merthyr Tydfil, Cardiff or Neath. But just as the MWR began building north towards Llanidloes, problems arose when the Manchester and Milford Railway (M&MR) finally received permission to connect the industrial north west of England directly with the port of Milford Haven via a series of interconnecting lines in the Manchester and Milford Railway Act 1860 (23 & 24 Vict. c. clxxv). The initial proposal had been put forward in 1846 but the scheme was not passed until it received backing from the London and North Western Railway. As a result of this timing, Parliament had accidentally granted the M&MR and the MWR the same rights to build two separate lines through the same terrain.

In response the M&MR prioritised its work on completing the first section to Llanidloes by working east from Llangurig on what became known as the Llangurig branch. Further work west of Llangurig is visible on Google Earth and Victorian OS Maps including the portals of the summit tunnel at Blaen Myherin. However, by 1861, surveyors and navvies from the competing companies were physically clashing south of the town.

In response, the Llanidloes and Newtown (Mid Wales and Manchester and Milford) Railway Act 1862 (25 & 26 Vict. c. clxii) was passed, giving the jointly owned Llanidloes and Newtown Railway (L&NR) the rights to extend southwards from Llanidloes with 1.5 miles (2.4 km) of double track to Penpontbren Junction where the M&MR line would diverge to Carmarthen and the MWR line would continue to Builth Road (serving Builth Wells). The M&MR and MWR would both pay 5% "per annum" on construction costs and maintenance. The three companies would also pay equal shares of interest and running costs for a new station at Llanidloes. However these charges would eventually prove crippling for the M&MR. The northern section from Llanidloes to Newtown would be operated through the jointly owned L&NR; connecting the MWR and M&MR with the Oswestry and Newtown Railway.

The commercial rivalry between the rail companies meant Llanidloes station would no longer be just a small country stop between Newtown and Builth Wells. It would now stand at the junction between the MWR and the M&MR. The building was therefore designed in a style befitting a grand junction station and the headquarters of Cambrian Railways. When it was completed in 1864, Llanidloes had a Georgian-style exterior and the appearance of an early-19th-century country residence. The station also had a large island platform, a footbridge, and substantial freight sidings to the east.

By 1875 the M&MR was in receivership because it had been unable to raise the capital required to complete the railway from north-west England to west Wales. The line beyond Llangurig to Strata Florida for Carmarthen was abandoned after initial works to the summit tunnel including both north and south portals. The M&MR was diverted west from Strata Florida to Aberystwyth; the remaining 1.5-mile spur from Penpontbren Junction to Llangurig was lifted in 1882 after carrying one demonstration freight train. This left the junction-intended Llanidloes without a junction. The grand station building was largely left unoccupied. The Cambrian Railways (CR) had already moved into its main headquarters at Oswestry in 1864. On grouping in 1923, the CR became part of the Great Western Railway.

In 1963, the station and the line were part of a proposed move into the London Midland Region of British Railways. Before the Beeching Axe or the transfer occurred, the entire former Mid-Wales Railway system was closed to passengers on 31 December 1962. Freight traffic continued to serve Llanidloes (via Moat Lane Junction) until 1967 when the final section was closed.

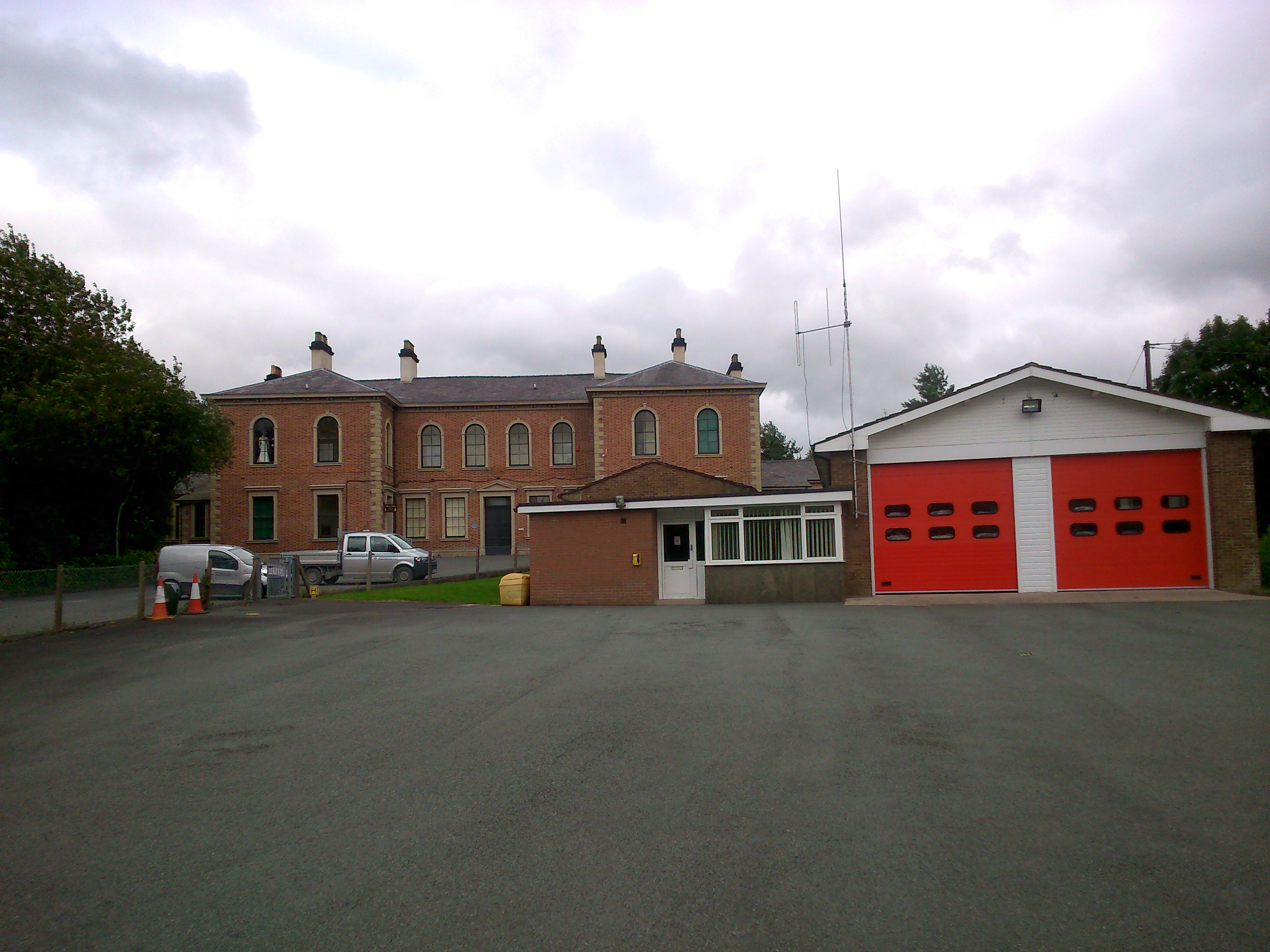
The station building and fire station in August 2014

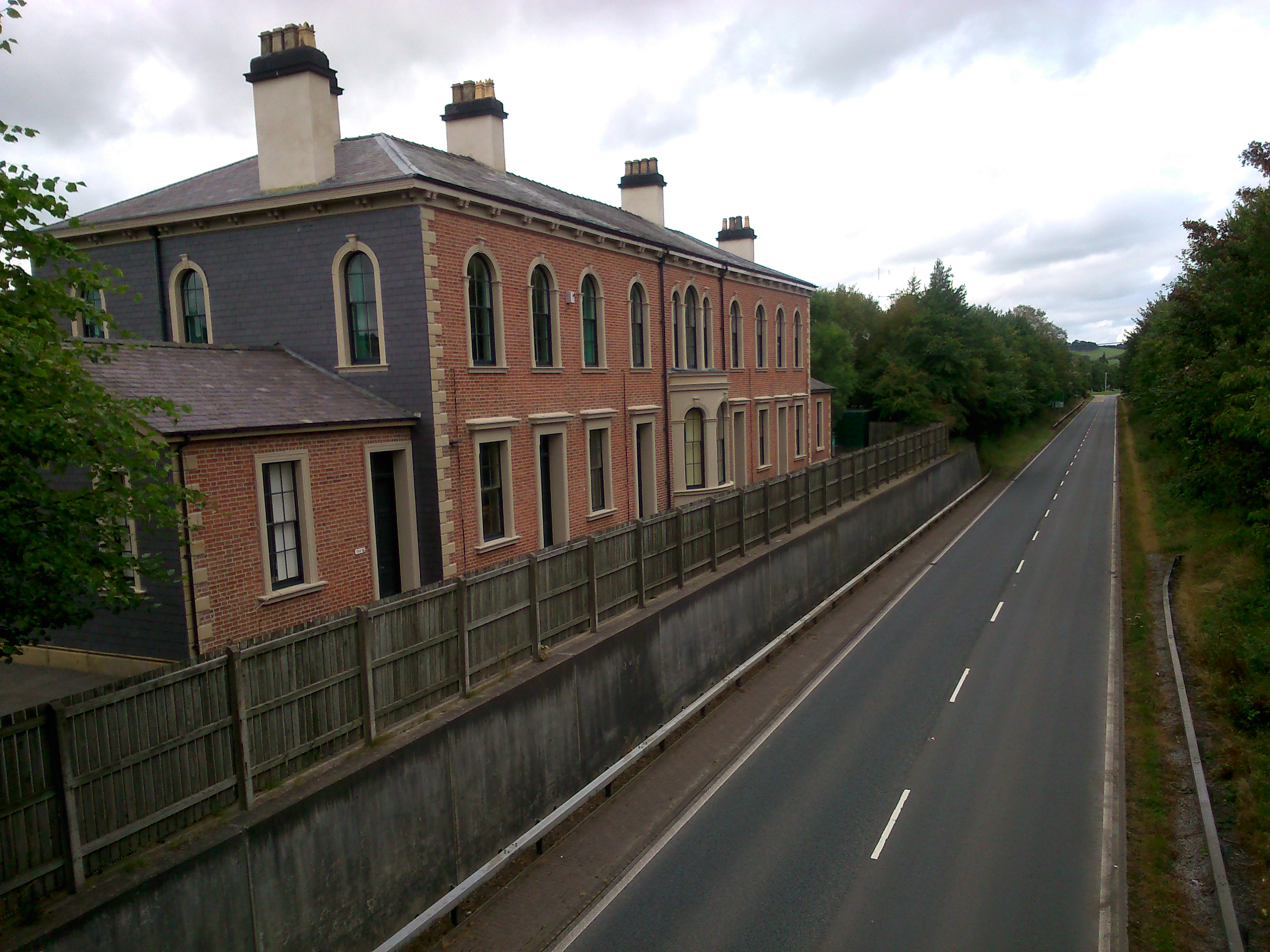
The station building and platform in 2014 with a bypass road along the former trackbed

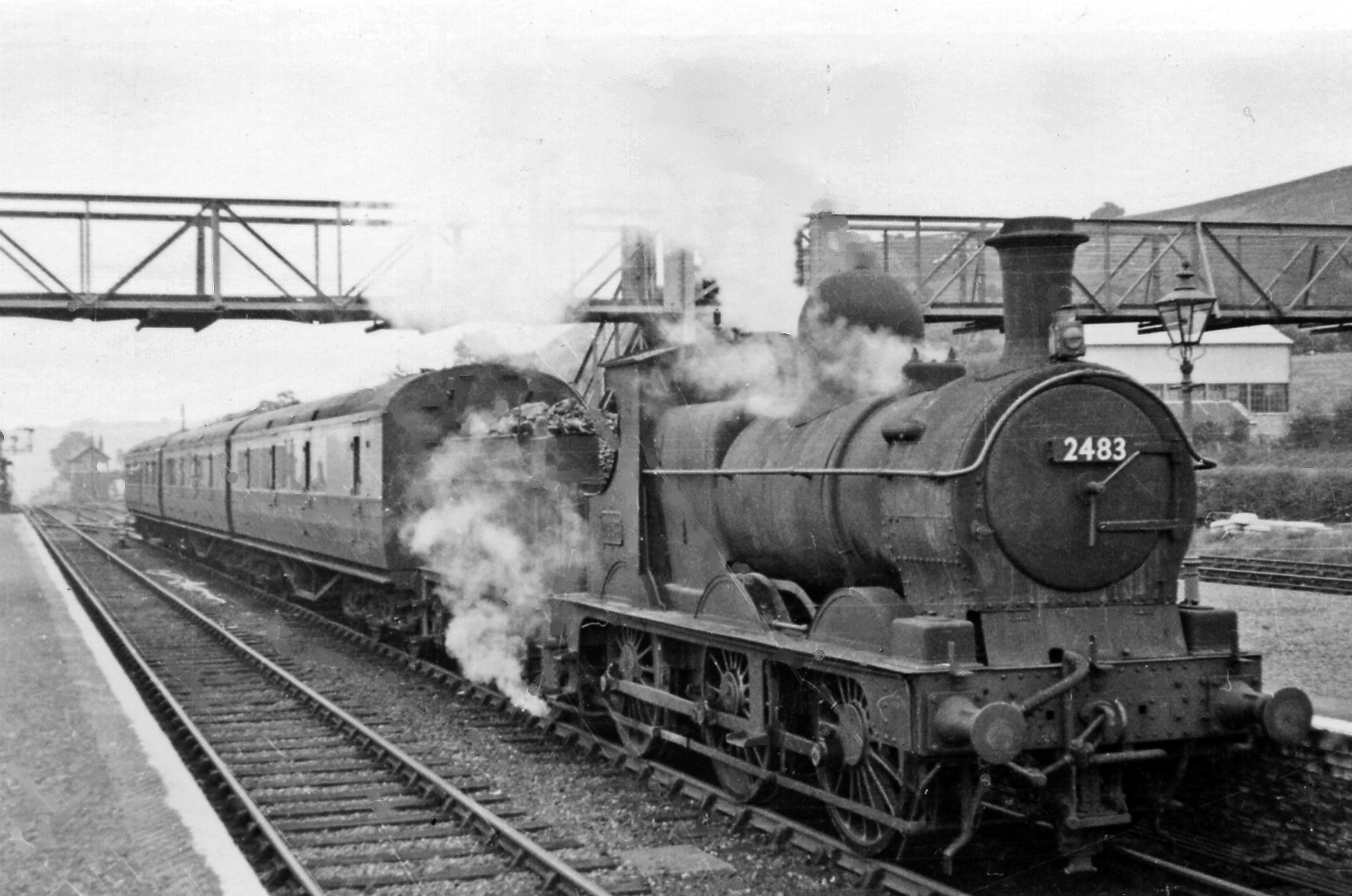
Ex-GWR "Dean Goods" 2301 Class 0-6-0 No.2483 waits at Llanidloes railway station to work a summer afternoon stopping passenger train south towards Builth Wells and Brecon, 29 August 1949.

== Services ==
Preceding station	Disused railways	Following station
Dolwen; Line and station closed	Cambrian Railways; Llanidloes and Newtown Railway; Mid-Wales Railway	Tylwch; Line and station closed
