= Carmarthen–Aberystwyth line =

Former railway line in Wales

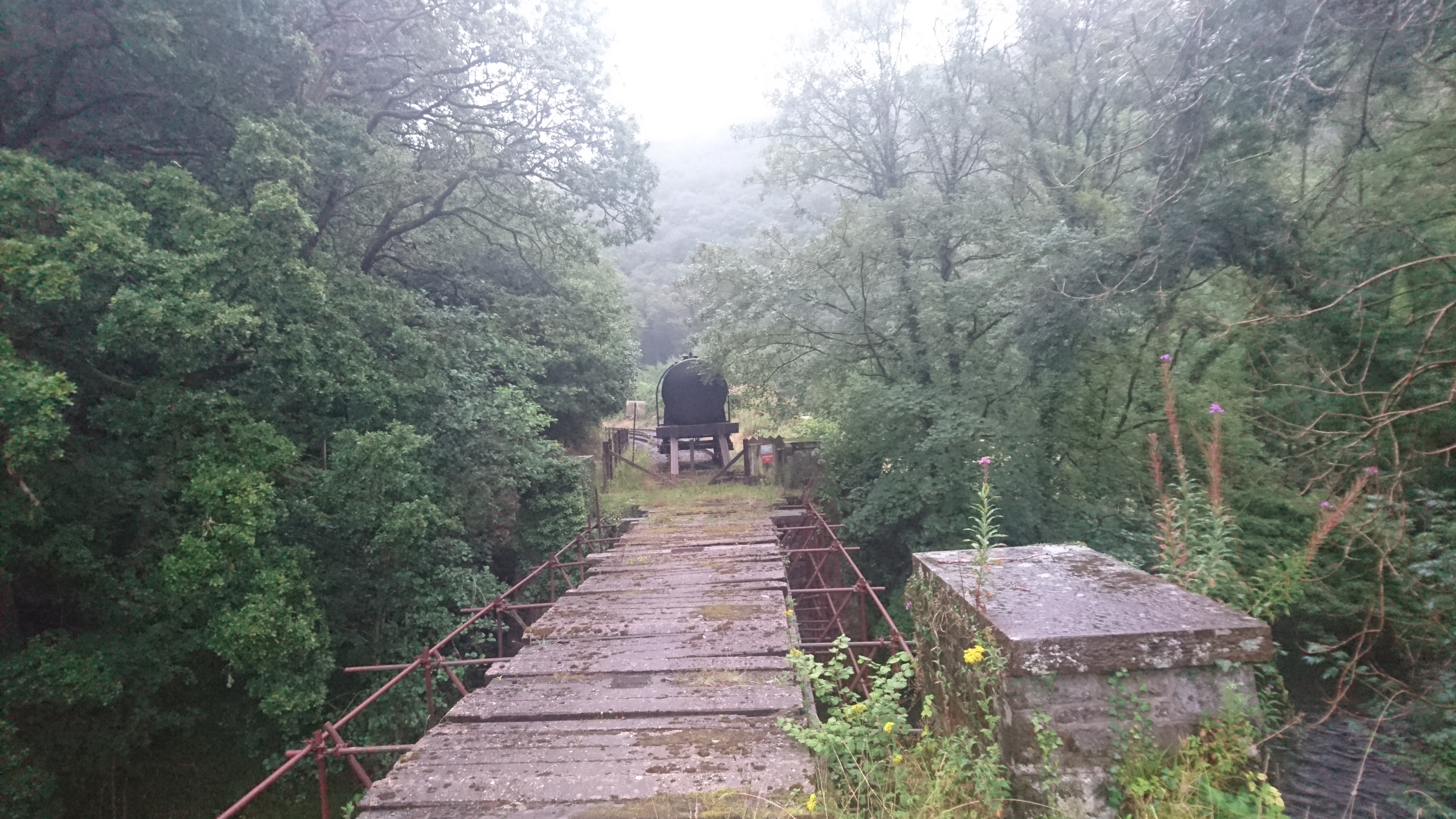

Overview
- Status: mostly disused; some reused by Gwili Railway
- Locale: Wales
- Termini: Aberystwyth; Carmarthen

History
- Opened: 1860 (Carmarthen to Cynwyl Elfed)
- Track lifted: 1975
- Closed: 1965 (passenger service and Aberaeron to Green Grove siding to all traffic); 1970 (Pont Llanio creamery to Lampeter, Aberaeron Junction); 1973 (Green Grove siding to Carmarthen); 1975 (Tracks lifted)

Technical
- Track gauge: 4 ft 8 1/2 in (1,435 mm) standard gauge
- Old gauge: 7 ft 1/4 in (2,140 mm) (Carmarthen to Llandyssul)

The Carmarthen–Aberystwyth line was originally a standard-gauge branch line of the Great Western Railway (GWR) in Wales, connecting Carmarthen and Aberystwyth.

It is now also a proposed railway link from Carmarthen railway station to Aberystwyth railway station, with five new proposed stations at Pencader, Llanybydder, Lampeter, Tregaron and Llanilar, with an estimated cost of around £620 million.

At Carmarthen, the line connected with the GWR mainline from London Paddington to Fishguard. At Aberystwyth, the line connected with the Cambrian Line. The line also had connecting branches to Aberaeron, Llandeilo and Newcastle Emlyn.

As a result of floods and the Beeching Axe, the line was entirely closed to passengers in February 1965. Freight traffic from Pont Llanio creamery (near Tregaron) to Aberaeron Junction (near Lampeter) ended in 1970; that from Green Grove siding (between Aberaeron and Lampeter) and from Newcastle Emlyn to Carmarthen ended in September 1973. The track was lifted in 1975, except for a short section at Bronwydd Arms station which was to be used by the Gwili Railway Preservation Society for its heritage train operation.

== History ==
=== Carmarthen and Cardigan Railway ===
The first section of line between Carmarthen and Conwil was opened in 1860 by the Carmarthen and Cardigan Railway. This was extended by the original company to Llandyssul and eventually to Newcastle Emlyn, by the GWR in the 1890s, but never reached Cardigan. The section from Carmarthen to Llandyssul was built as a broad-gauge route, with a third standard-gauge line added as far as Pencader Junction later, after the M&MR line was built.

=== Manchester and Milford Railway ===
The Manchester and Milford Railway was an ambitious proposal to connect Manchester and the industrialised Midlands and Northwest England with the docks at Milford Haven. This was a standard gauge line using the LNWR and Midland Railway metals (the M&MR would have connected with the Mid-Wales Railway at Llanidloes) and then, via a junction at Strata Florida, with the C&CR at Pencader. Trains would then have run on the C&CR to Carmarthen before connecting to the Pembroke and Tenby Railway for connection to the deepwater port at Milford Haven. The plan was that, combined with industrial traffic from South Wales, Milford Haven could "provide the Lancashire cotton industry with [an] alternative port to Liverpool."

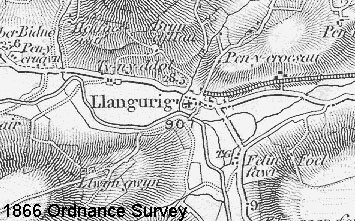
The Llangurig branch as built

The scheme ran into financial difficulties. The simplest section had been constructed first which meant that it faced undertaking the toughest engineering challenge – the line between Llanidloes and Strata Florida – when the money was running out. Though it started on the Llangurig branch, diverging from the Mid-Wales Railway at Penpontbren Junction, and got as far as Llangurig, it was decided, in 1865, instead to simply divert the Lampeter route to Aberystwyth rather than build it through the mountains, abandoning the hope for a strategic route. It has been suggested that the bankruptcy of Thomas Savin, renowned Welsh railway engineer and investor, in the 1860s, may have been partly involved as it was with the failure of several other Welsh railway projects. It opened this modified through line in 1867 and remained independent until taken over by the Great Western Railway by 1911.

The initial 1861 route survey (which had parliamentary approval) and a later 1864 route were locally controversial. The unbuilt section between Strata Florida and the railhead of the Llangurig branch would have been through very mountainous terrain, although only 15 miles (24 km) in length as the crow flies.

=== Closure ===
The line closed in two stages – Aberystwyth to Strata Florida closed prematurely in December 1964 when a section of the line one mile east of Llanilar was damaged by floods from the adjacent River Ystwyth. The remaining southern section closed to passengers in February 1965, as part of a nationwide process of railway closures and system rationalisation in the wake of the Beeching Report (see Beeching Cuts). Goods traffic continued in the form of milk trains from Carmarthen to Pont Llanio (between Lampeter and Tregaron) and the Felin Fach creamery (on the Aberaeron branch line) using Class 35 Hymek haulage until 1970, and with Class 37 haulage until the line closure in 1973.

== Current status ==
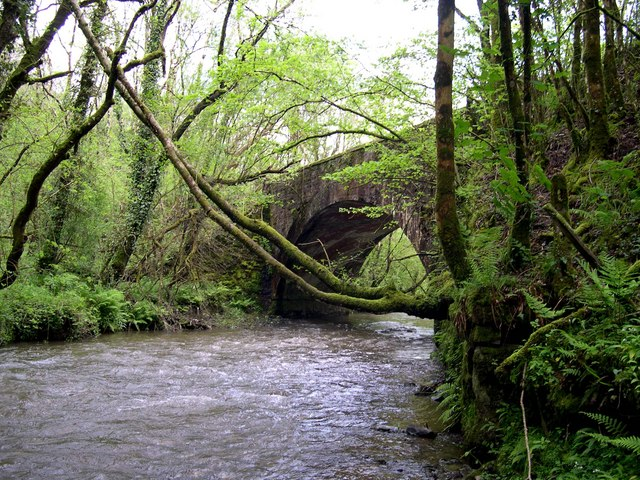
Disused railway bridge over the River Gwili on the former Carmarthen to Aberystwyth line

=== Gwili Railway ===
In 1974–75, the Gwili Railway was founded, and within three years, began operating over a mile long section of the line from Bronwydd Arms, north of Carmarthen.

The line was extended farther up the valley to Llwyfan Cerrig in 1987, crossing the River Gwili en route, and a further half a mile to Danycoed Halt in 2001. Since then (with the completion of the preserved line's southern extension to Abergwili in July 2017), over four miles of track have been restored, and the Gwili Railway currently runs from a new station called Abergwili Junction to Danycoed Halt.

The Gwili Railway plans eventually to restore the line northwards to Llanpumsaint.

=== Disused railway ===
In the north, parts of the trackbed from Aberystwyth to Trawsgoed, plus Ystrad Meurig via the Strata Florida station site to just south of the former Allt-ddu halt on Tregaron Bog (adjacent to the B4343 road) have been incorporated into the Ystwyth Trail cycle route. However, the section of trackbed from Trawsgoed station to just south of Ystrad Meurig including the tunnel adjacent to the former Caradog Falls halt is unavailable, being mostly in private ownership. On the Ystwyth Trail eastward from Llanilar to Trawsgoed, the flooding damage which caused closure of the line in December 1964 can be seen.

During the mid-1990s, a narrow-gauge railway was unsuccessfully proposed by the Ystwyth Valley Preservation Society – based on reopening a section of route from Llanilar to Llanfarian. Some items of standard-gauge rolling stock were moved into Llanilar station yard at the time – including an LNER compartment coach plus some 4-wheel tank wagons.

Quantities of trackbed and bridge abutments remain along the route, although some parts have been farmed over. Other surviving remains include, from north to south:

- Llanrhystyd Road Nothing remains.
- Llanilar station platforms – with remains of GWR fencing. The waiting room was removed to nearby Plas Llidiarddau where it is used for garden storage. Much has been replaced but the fundamental structure is well maintained. (In private ownership and not accessible.)
- Felindyffryn The letters of the old Felindyffryn Halt sign are kept in storage by a local family.
- Trawscoed: the station survived more or less intact for many years, in a coal merchant's yard, but more recently the site has been cleared and redeveloped for housing.
- Caradog Falls Halt, intact but surrounded by private property. (Could not be located in October 2019.)
- Strata Florida: station house, advertised as a self-catering holiday let.
- Alltddu Halt. Nothing remains.
- Tregaron station shelter, adjacent to Tregaron hospital, is now a viewing shelter for the Tregaron Horse Club (but could not be located in October 2019); also, a GWR pagoda shelter remains on a farm near Tregaron High School.
- Pont Llanio: A GWR 1930s cast-iron water tank is located next to the road bridge and the site of a former creamery.
- Olmarch Halt: Parts of the GWR halt platform remain under a minor road bridge east of the A485 road.
- Llangybi: A road overbridge crosses the line.
- Derry Ormond station building and platform remain at the end of a narrow road from the village of Betws Bledrws— one of only two station buildings surviving on the line.
- Lampeter goods shed—the only surviving railway related building in Lampeter. A large steel and concrete bridge across the River Teifi remains, adjacent to the A482 road south of Lampeter.
- Llanybydder Llanybydder railway station is now the village rugby club. A road bridge also crosses the old line.
- Maesycrugiau A bridge crosses over the line and the old platforms are visible from a distance on private land.
- Bryn Teifi Bryn Teifi tunnel and platform were made accessible to the public in spring 2014.
- Pencader: A steel overbridge remains over the road between Pencader and Llandysul
- Pencader Tunnel – The southern portal remains accessible from a forestry plantation road which joins a minor road between Pencader and Llanpumpsaint.
- Llanpumpsaint: An overbridge remains over the road through the village.
- Cynwyl Elfed station platforms and some rolling stock are owned by the Gwili Railway.

== Stations ==
Named from north to south, unless otherwise stated:

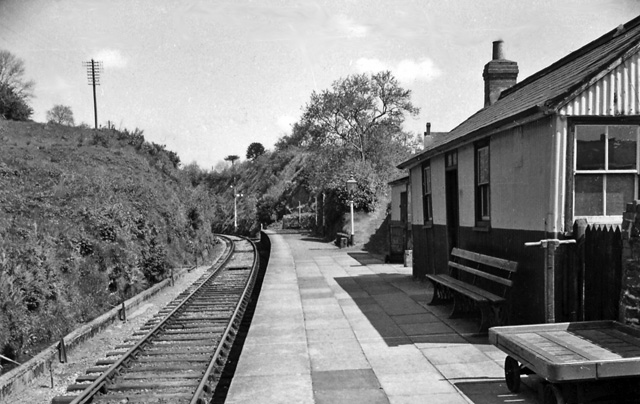
Bryn Teifi station in 1962

=== Carmarthen and Cardigan Railway ===
- Newcastle Emlyn
- Henllan
- Pentrecourt platform
- Llandyssul
- Pencader – junction with Manchester and Milford Railway
- Llanpumsaint
- Cynwyl Elfed
- Llwyfan Cerrig
- Bronwydd Arms
- Carmarthen – junction with South Wales Railway, still open

=== Manchester and Milford Railway ===
- Aberystwyth – owned by the Cambrian Railways, junction with Vale of Rheidol Railway, still open
- Llanrhystyd Road
- Llanilar
- Trawsgoed
- Strata Florida Location of proposed triangle for northern route to Llangurig
- Alltddu Later site of a small GWR halt
- Tregaron
- Pont Llanio Site of the now closed Milk Creamery that would keep the line open north of Lampeter until 1970 – located near to village of Llanddewi-Brefi
- Olmarch Halt Later site of a small GWR halt
- Llangybi Small halt located between two road bridges
- Derry Ormond railway station Near to village of Betws Bledrws
- Lampeter Junction station for the Lampeter, Aberayron and New Quay Light Railway
- Llanybydder
- Maesycrugiau
- Bryn Teifi formerly New Quay Road
- Pencader – junction with Carmarthen and Cardigan Railway

=== Lampeter, Aberayron and New Quay Light Railway ===
==== Constructed ====
Stations along the line included:

- Aberaeron
- Llanerch Aeron Halt: Location of junction of proposed branch to New Quay
- Crossways Halt
- Ciliau Aeron Halt
- Felin Fach (near Ystrad Aeron): Later site of the Green Grove creamery that would keep the line open for freight only until 1973. The station building has been moved to Llwynfan Cerrig, Gwili Railway
- Talsarn Halt
- Blaenplwyf Halt: Summit of the line
- Silian Halt
- Lampeter

==== Proposed ====
- Aberaeron Junction
- Oakford: Proposed intermediate station
- Llanarth: Summit of the proposed line
- Gilfachreda: Proposed Intermediate Station
- New Quay: Terminus of the proposed line

== Reopening ==
Official talks of reopening started in 2014, when First Minister Carwyn Jones shared his support towards the reopening, and it was adopted as an official policy of the Welsh Liberal Democrats. The next two years were followed by support from Carmarthenshire County Council, Ceredigion County Council, the Minister for Science, Economy and Transport (Welsh Government) and Plaid Cymru. Official talks and meeting included Stephen Crabb MP, Secretary of State for Wales and James Price, Director General, Economy, Science and Transport (Welsh Government) shortly followed by the AECOM report. There have been several support, funding and help pledges.

In October 2016, the Welsh government announced it would be allocating £300,000 towards funding a feasibility report into re-opening the railway as part of the draft 2017–18 budget. The study is being carried out by engineering consultancy Mott MacDonald and began in September 2017. Subsequently, Ken Skates, the Welsh Transport Minister consulted the Secretary of State for Transport, Grant Shapps, explaining that the reopening of the line was important to revitalise the Welsh economy following the COVID-19 pandemic.

In October 2018, the Welsh Government published the full feasibility study which showed that there were no major obstacles to reopening, and that the project would cost up to £775m although this was subject to a number of unknown further costs being determined such as the crossing of Trawscoed Bog. In September 2020, this was revised to £620 million by the campaign group Traws Link Cymru.

== See also ==
- List of never used railways
