= Pencader Junction railway station =

Disused railway station in Pencader, Carmarthenshire

Pencader Junction

General information
- Location: Pencader, Carmarthenshire; Wales
- Coordinates: 52.0096°N 4.2663°W
- Grid reference: SN445370

Other information
- Status: Disused

History
- Original company: Manchester and Milford Railway
- Pre-grouping: Great Western Railway

Key dates
- 1 January 1866: Opened
- May 1880: Closed
Location

Pencader Junction railway station served the village of Pencader, Carmarthenshire, Wales, from 1866 to 1880 on the Manchester and Milford Railway.

== History ==
The station was opened on 1 January 1866 by the Manchester and Milford Railway. It was situated 300 yards west of the B4459. It closed in May 1880 as that was when it was last in the timetables.

Preceding station	Disused railways	Following station
Maesycrugiau; Line and station closed	Manchester and Milford Railway	Pencader; Line and station closed
