= Pencarreg Halt railway station =

Former railway station in Wales

Pencarreg
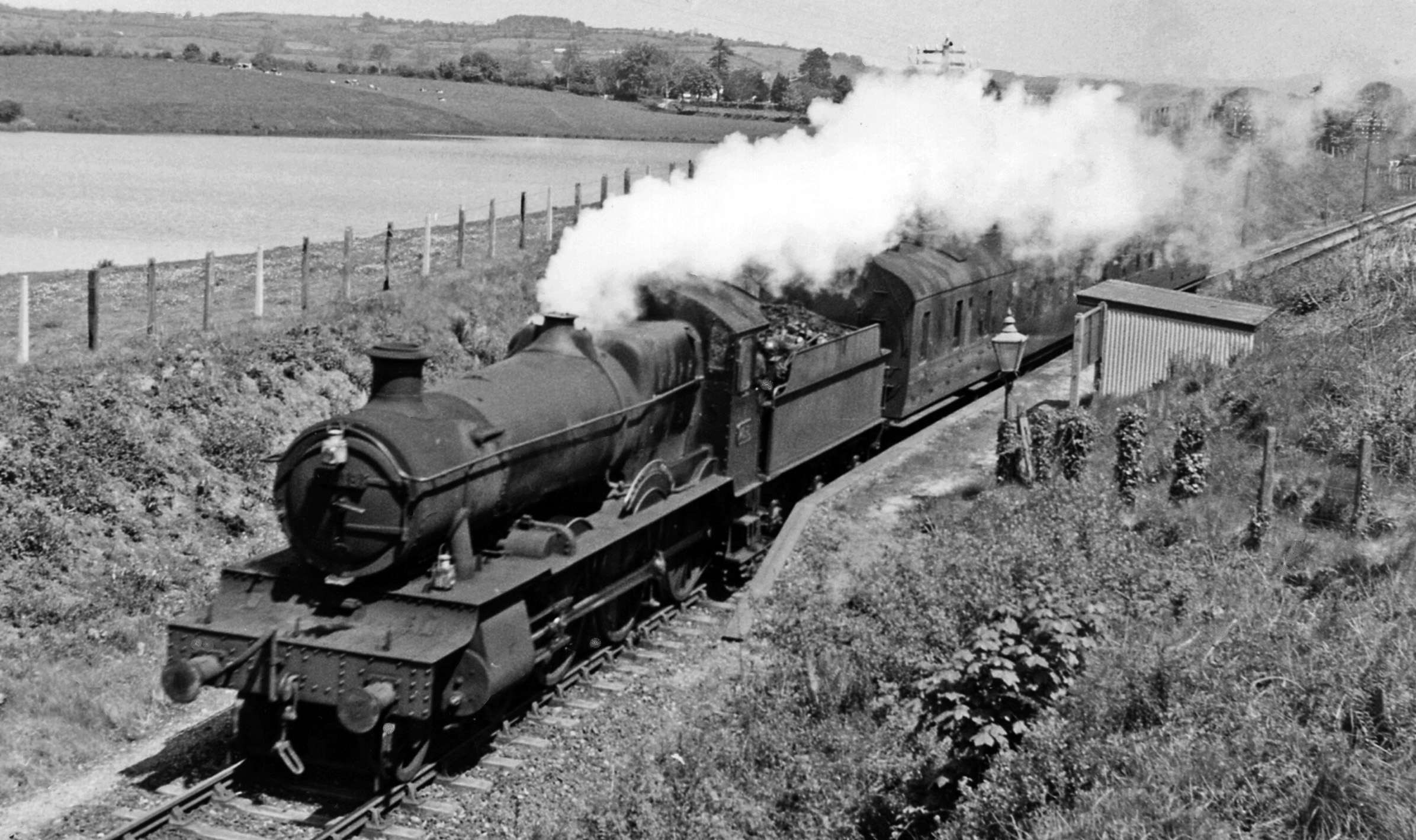
- Aberystwyth - Carmarthen train at Pencarreg Halt.

General information
- Location: Pencarreg, Carmarthenshire; Wales
- Coordinates: 52.087550°N 4.1386787°W
- Grid reference: SN5356645403
- Platforms: 1

Other information
- Status: Disused

History
- Post-grouping: Great Western Railway

Key dates
- 9 June 1930: Opened
- 22 February 1965: Closed
Location

Pencarreg Halt railway station served the hamlet and rural locale of Pencarreg from 1930 to 1965 on the old Carmarthen Aberystwyth Line in the Welsh county of Carmarthenshire.

== History ==
In 1867 the Manchester and Milford Railway (M&MR) opened the railway from Pencader to Aberystwyth. however in 1906 the Great Western Railway took over the line and added a halt at Pencarreg in 1930. The halt became part of British Railways upon nationalisation in 1948 but was closed in 1965. Photographs show that it stood on a single track section of the line, had no sidings or signalling, had one short wooden platform, a small shelter, a single oil lamp and a path leading down from the nearby road.

In December 1964 severe flooding damaged the line south of Aberystwyth and passenger services were cancelled. A limited service continued running from Carmarthen to Tregaron for a few months after the line was severed and the route was closed to passengers in February 1965, the line itself however remained open for milk traffic until 1973.

Nothing now remains of the station and the trackbed is a rough track.

Preceding station	Disused railways	Following station
Llanybydder	Great Western Railway; Carmarthen to Aberystwyth Line	Lampeter
