= Llanrhystyd Road railway station =

Former railway station in Wales

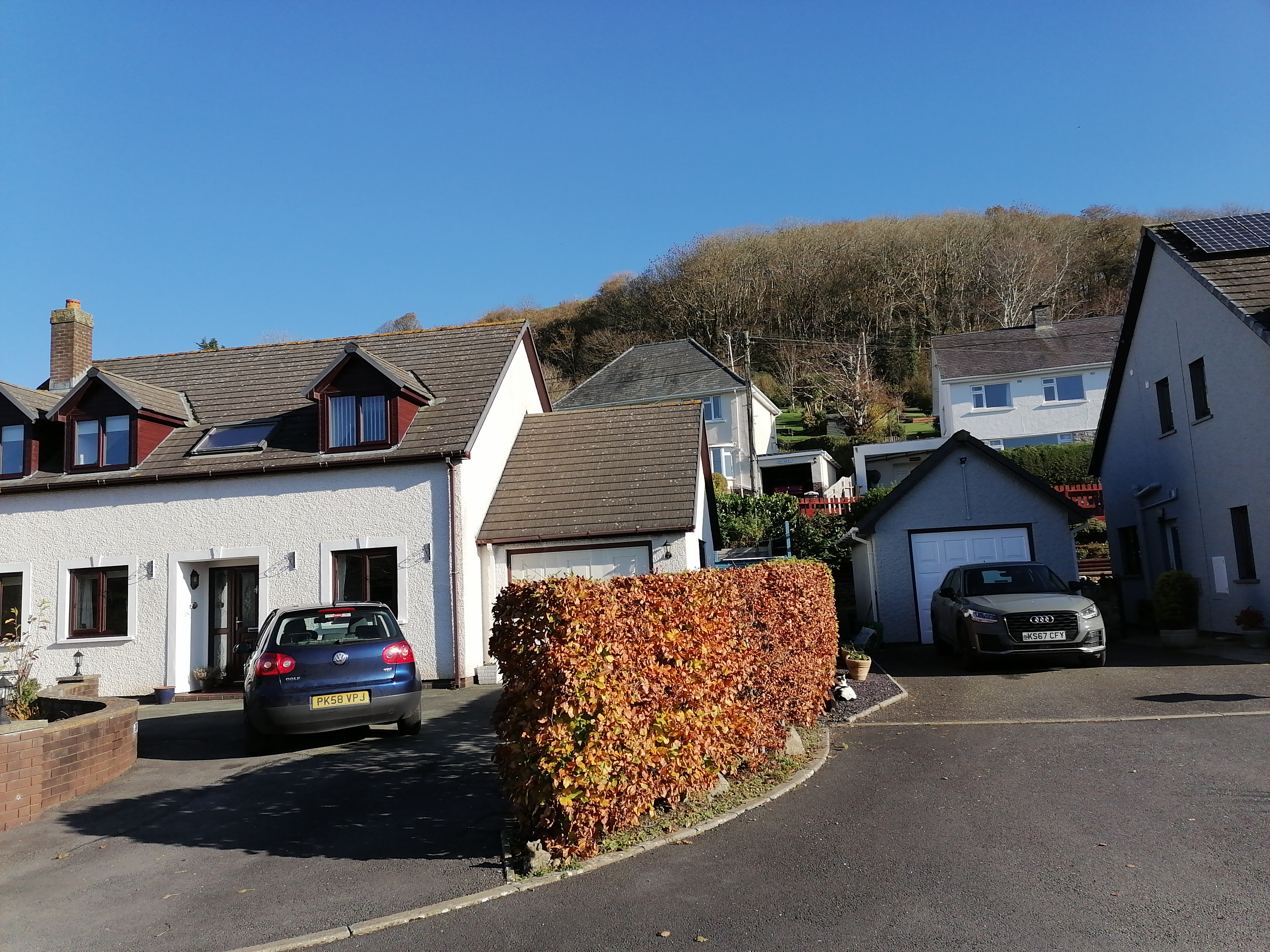
- The site of the station in 2020

General information
- Location: Llanfarian, Ceredigion; Wales
- Coordinates: 52.3805°N 4.0706°W
- Grid reference: SN5915877850
- Platforms: 1

Other information
- Status: Disused

History
- Original company: Manchester and Milford Railway
- Pre-grouping: Great Western Railway

Key dates
- 12 August 1867: Opened
- 14 December 1964: Closed
Location

Llanrhystyd Road railway station was located on the Carmarthen to Aberystwyth Line, originally called the Manchester and Milford Railway, before being transferred to the GWR.

== History ==
The station opened in August 1867 to serve the village of Llanrhystyd which was nearly seven miles southwards on the Fishguard road A487 hence the Road suffix. The station closed in December 1964 when services were truncated at Strata Florida, following flood damage by the River Ystwyth to the line one mile east of Llanilar. Formal closure was confirmed two months later. The station had a single platform, a small shelter, a ground frame, and a goods passing loop. The station had a simple corrugated iron shelter and a signal box on the single platform.

Preceding station	Disused railways	Following station
Llanilar	Great Western Railway; Carmarthen to Aberystwyth Line	Aberystwyth
