= Felindyffryn Halt railway station =

Former railway station in Wales

Felindyffryn Halt

General information
- Location: Felindyffryn, Ceredigion; Wales
- Coordinates: 52.3510°N 3.9812°W
- Grid reference: SN6516374391
- Platforms: 1

Other information
- Status: Disused

History
- Original company: Great Western Railway

Key dates
- 10 June 1935: Opened
- 14 December 1964: Closed
Location

Felindyffryn Halt was located on the Carmarthen to Aberystwyth Line, originally called the Manchester and Milford Railway, before being transferred to the Great Western Railway (GWR).

== History ==
The station was opened in June 1935 by the GWR to serve the mill and the urban area. The station closed in December 1964 when services were truncated at Strata Florida, following flood damage by the River Ystwyth to the line one mile east of Llanilar. Formal closure was confirmed two months later. The halt was of a basic wooden platform construction with a simple shelter.

Preceding station	Disused railways	Following station
Trawscoed	Great Western Railway; Carmarthen to Aberystwyth Line	Llanilar
