= Trawscoed railway station =

Former railway station in Wales

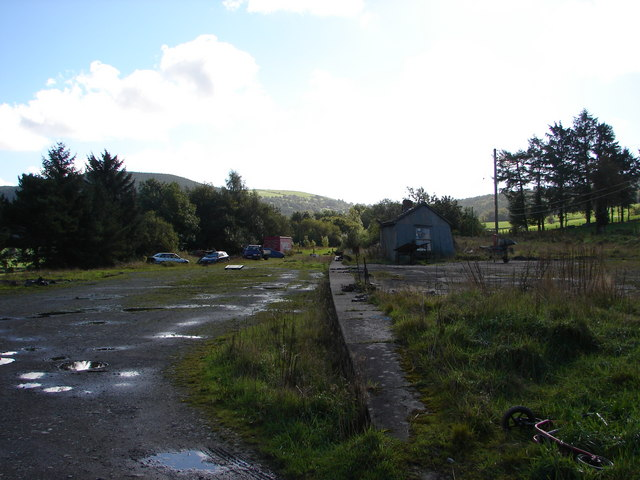

General information
- Location: Trawsgoed, Ceredigion; Wales
- Coordinates: 52.3351°N 3.9591°W
- Grid reference: SN666725
- Platforms: 1

Other information
- Status: Disused

History
- Original company: Manchester and Milford Railway
- Pre-grouping: Great Western Railway

Key dates
- 12 August 1867: Opened
- 14 December 1964: Closed
Location

Trawscoed railway station was located on the Carmarthen to Aberystwyth Line (originally called the Manchester and Milford Railway before being transferred to the GWR). The station had a signal box on the single platform, a weighing machine, several sidings, and a corrugated iron waiting room and ticket office combined. The estate of Trawsgoed is located nearby.

== History ==
The station opened in August 1867 to serve Trawsgoed Estate. The station closed in December 1964 when services were truncated at Strata Florida, following flood damage to the line at Llanilar. Formal closure was confirmed two months later. In 2001 the station building and platform survived in alternative use, but collapsed in 2006.

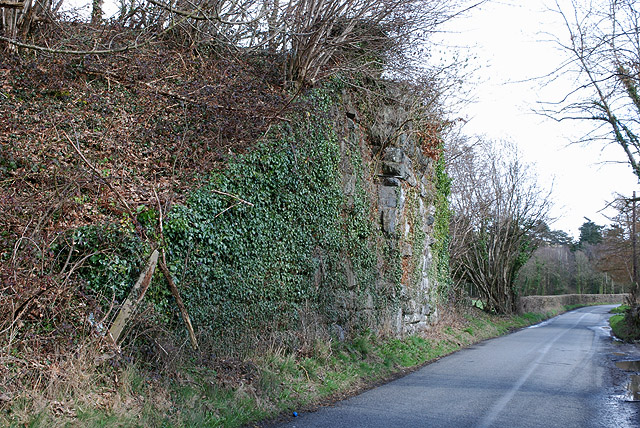
Remains of an old railway bridge near Trawscoed

On the night of Sunday 7 August 1955, the royal train was stabled nearby on a straight close to Abermad house. Two crews were assigned to ensure the engines maintained the train heating throughout. Two locomotives of the Stanier 8F variety were employed, rather than the normal 'Manor' engines. Only one was needed, but the second was added in case of failure. The 'Manor' was deemed too light an engine for the train and other stronger WR varieties were unable to traverse the line, due to weight restrictions. The 8F engines were provided by the Swansea (LMR) depot. The train wasen route to the opening of an extension to the National Library of Wales on 8 August.

The station building was used as a coal merchant office after the line closed.

Preceding station	Disused railways	Following station
Caradog Falls	Great Western Railway; Carmarthen to Aberystwyth Line	Felindyffryn Halt
