= Tynygraig =

Village in Ceredigion, Wales

Coordinates: 52.307790°N 3.918860°W

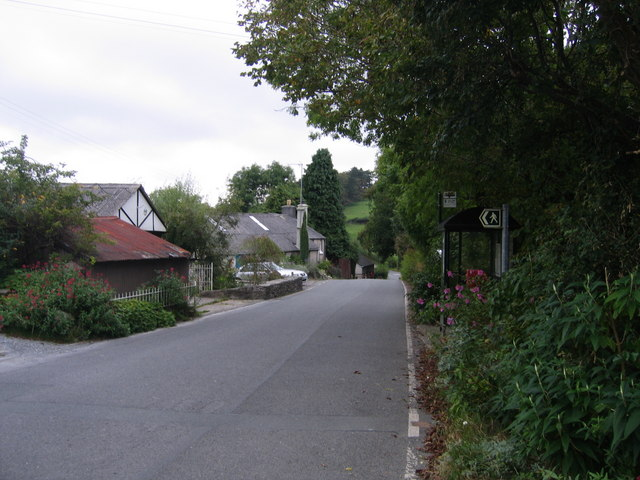

- Location within Ceredigion
- OS grid reference: SN 6927 6947
  - Cardiff: 65.3 mi (105.1 km)
  - London: 170.7 mi (274.7 km)
- Community: Ystrad Meurig
- Principal area: Ceredigion
- Country: Wales
- Sovereign state: United Kingdom
- Post town: Tregaron
- Postcode district: SY25
- Police: Dyfed-Powys
- Fire: Mid and West Wales
- Ambulance: Welsh
- UK Parliament: Ceredigion Preseli
- Senedd Cymru – Welsh Parliament: Ceredigion Penfro

Tynygraig (also spelled as Tyn-y-graig or Ty'n-y-graig) is a village in the community of Ystrad Meurig, Ceredigion, Wales, made up of about a dozen dwellings and several surrounding farms. The village was previously served by Caradog Falls Halt railway station until its closure in 1964. The church of St Gwnnws is to the west of the village.

== See also ==
- List of localities in Wales by population
