= Llangybi railway station (Ceredigion) =

Former railway station in Wales

General information
- Location: Llangybi, Ceredigion; Wales
- Coordinates: 52.1560°N 4.0326°W
- Grid reference: SN6104252809
- Platforms: 1

Other information
- Status: Disused

History
- Original company: Manchester and Milford Railway
- Pre-grouping: Great Western Railway

Key dates
- 1873: Opened as a halt
- 22 February 1965: Closed
Location

Llangybi railway station, previously served the village and rural locale of Llangybi on the Carmarthen Aberystwyth Line in the Welsh county of Ceredigion.

== History ==
The Manchester and Milford Railway (M&MR) opened from Pencader to Aberystwyth on 12 August 1867. The line went into receivership from 1875 to 1900.

The Great Western Railway took over the service in 1906, and fully absorbed the line in 1911. The Great Western Railway and the station passed on to British Railways on nationalisation in 1948. It was then closed by the British Railways Board. The OS maps and photographs show that it had one platform, and no passing loop.

Passenger services ran through to Aberystwyth until flooding severely damaged the line south of Aberystwyth in December 1964. A limited passenger service continued running from Carmarthen to Strata Florida until February 1965.

The line remained open for milk traffic until 1970.

Preceding station	Disused railways	Following station
Derry Ormond	Great Western Railway; Carmarthen to Aberystwyth Line	Olmarch Halt
