= Derry Ormond railway station =

Former railway station in Wales

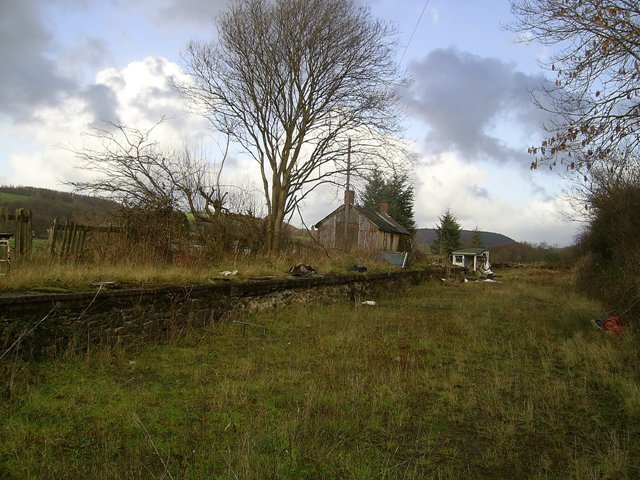
- The old station site in 2006

General information
- Location: Betws Bledrws, Ceredigion; Wales
- Coordinates: 52.1437°N 4.0509°W
- Grid reference: SN5975151483
- Platforms: 1

Other information
- Status: Disused

History
- Original company: Manchester and Milford Railway
- Pre-grouping: Great Western Railway

Key dates
- 1 September 1866: Opened as Bettws
- July 1874: Renamed Derry Ormond
- 22 February 1965: Closed
Location

Derry Ormond railway station served the hamlet and rural locale of Betws Bledrws near Llangybi, as well as the mansion and estate of Derry Ormond (demolished in 1953) on the Carmarthen Aberystwyth Line in the Welsh county of Ceredigion. Opened in 1866 as Bettws, it was renamed in July 1874 in honour of the local estate, owned by the influential Jones, later Inglis-Jones, family.

== History ==
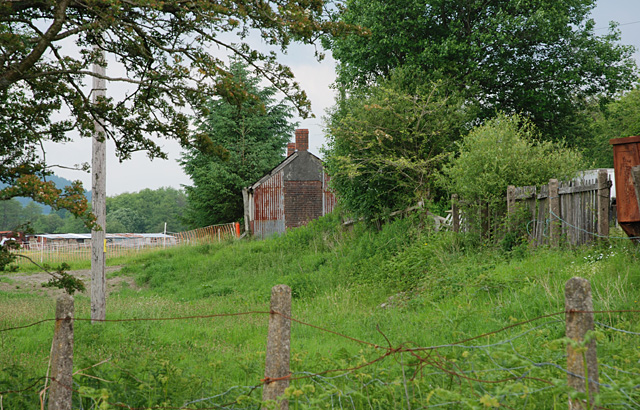
The old station in 2008

The Manchester and Milford Railway (M&MR) opened from Pencader to Aberystwyth on 12 August 1867. The line went into receivership from 1875 to 1900.

The Great Western Railway took over the service in 1906, and fully absorbed the line in 1911. The Great Western Railway and the station passed on to British Railways on nationalisation in 1948. It was then closed by the British Railways Board. The OS maps and photographs show that it had one platform, a signal box, a weighing machine, and a siding. A passing loop was located just beyond the Llangybi end of the single platform.

Passenger services ran through to Aberystwyth until flooding severely damaged the line south of Aberystwyth in December 1964. A limited service continued running from Carmarthen to Tregaron for a few months after the line was severed, however this was the era of the Beeching Axe and the line was closed to passengers in February 1965.

The line remained open for milk traffic until 1970. The corrugated iron station buildings are a remarkable survival of a small station little altered since Great Western Railway, in GWR colours, which served the combined function of waiting room and ticket office.

As of 2024, the refurbished building has been used as a holiday let.

| Preceding station | Disused railways | Following station |
|---|---|---|
| Lampeter | Great Western Railway; Carmarthen to Aberystwyth Line | Llangybi |
