= Caradog Falls Halt railway station =

Disused railway station in Wales

Coordinates: 52.30815°N 3.92113°W

Caradog Falls Halt

General information
- Location: Tynygraig, Ceredigion; Wales
- Platforms: 1

Other information
- Status: Disused

History
- Original company: Great Western Railway

Key dates
- 5 September 1932: Opened
- 14 December 1964: Closed
Location

Caradog Falls Halt railway station was one of five new halts on the Carmarthen to Aberystwyth Line (originally called the Manchester and Milford Railway before being transferred to the GWR), which were constructed during the 1930s.

The halt opened in September 1932 to serve the nearby hamlet of Tynygraig, where a short tunnel ran underneath the road. It was also intended for the convenience of any visitors to the waterfalls. The halt consisted of a timber platform and corrugated iron shelter.

The station closed in December 1964 when services were truncated at Strata Florida, following flood damage to the line at Llanilar. Formal closure was confirmed two months later.

No trace of the timber halt remains, and the site is now in use as a private garden.

== Sources ==
- Butt, R. V. J. (October 1995). The Directory of Railway Stations: details every public and private passenger station, halt, platform and stopping place, past and present (1st ed.). Sparkford: Patrick Stephens Ltd. ISBN 978-1-85260-508-7. OCLC 60251199. OL 11956311M.

Preceding station	Disused railways	Following station
Trawscoed	Great Western Railway; Carmarthen to Aberystwyth Line	Strata Florida
