= Pencader Tunnel =

Abandoned railway tunnel in West Wales

Coordinates: 51.9793°N 4.3026°W

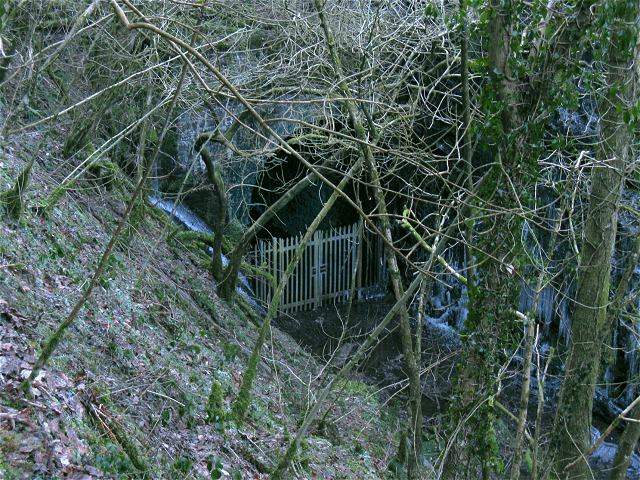
Northern end

Pencader Tunnel is an abandoned railway tunnel on the old trackbed of the Carmarthen to Aberystwyth main line in south-west Wales. It was originally bored for the Llanpumsaint-Pencader section of the Carmarthen and Cardigan Railway (C&CR).

It is approximately 988 yards (903 m) long (just over half-a-mile), making it the longest tunnel in West Wales and is bored through Ordovician shales. It is single-track and built to the C&CR's adopted broad gauge dimensions, as opposed to the smaller standard gauge used on Britain's railways today. It is also known as alternatively Alltwalis Tunnel and Dolgran Tunnel to local villagers.

== History ==
From the first proposals of the Carmarthen and Cardigan railway it was known that an expensive and long tunnel would be needed to take the line between the valleys of Skanda Vale (in which Llanpumpsaint station resided) and Dolgran, under the Brechfa Forest watershed. Several separate engineers surveyed the line, including Isambard Kingdom Brunel, with varying schemes. Brunel proposed a dead-straight tunnel to connect the valleys, though after reworking, the final design was longer in order to ease the gradients.

As built, the tunnel was approximately 988 yards (903 m) long, curving slightly from the southern portal in Skanda Vale, running straight for most of its length and then curving for the final third into Dolgran. The digging would require two construction shafts which could then be used for ventilation. Construction started in the spring of 1857 to bore the tunnel at the same time as work began on the first stage of the railway line in the town of Carmarthen.

During construction in 1859, the C&CR attempted to switch from broad gauge to standard gauge, which would have meant all railway infrastructure (including the tunnel), could be built to smaller (and thus cheaper) dimensions. Such a change would require the approval of the British Parliament and pressurisation on the company by the South Wales Railway, a broad gauge line in the area which did not want the rival standard gauge making an incursion on its territory, meant the application to Parliament never occurred.

Digging initially proceeded from four sites - at either end and from the bottom of the first ventilation shaft sunk. Once the second shaft was finished, digging also commenced from there, though this had been abandoned by May 1860 according to a report which stated that 576 yards (527 m) had been dug by this time, approximately two-thirds of the full length. Work was expected to be finished by December 1860/January 1861.

As it stood, the tunnel was only 'finished' in March 1861 although, at the time, it was exposed rock without a brick lining and required further work to complete it. The long approach cuttings were also unfinished at this time. During construction of the tunnel, many of the horses used to haul away excavated rock died from disease and were buried in the field surrounding the northern of the two shafts. The same field also has grassed-over rubble remaining from cottages built by the construction navvies. Much of the spoil excavated was used to build embankments north and south of the tunnel but large spoil heaps can be seen on the hillsides around both ventilation shafts.

Further delays were caused by the original contractor for the railway, Jays of London, abandoning the construction of the line in autumn 1861. By November, however, another contractor, Holdens, had taken over the task. Work was focused on finishing several miles of railway either side of the tunnel and, although easy to the north, to the south, heavy engineering of cuttings and embankments slowed the work.

Track is known to have been laid through the tunnel at some point prior to December 1863, as a company report mentions an accident in that month on a ballast train en route to Pencader, beyond the tunnel. Official government inspection was carried out in January 1864 and the tunnel opened with the rest of the Llanpumsaint-Pencader section of the line on 3 June 1864. At the time, the tunnel was still unlined and a watchman was employed to inspect the tunnel for any rockfalls, until it was eventually lined with brick some years later.

By the time the tunnel was finished, having taken four years to build and a further three to complete the railway approaches to it, the project had crippled the finances of the Carmarthen to Cardigan Railway, which soon went into receivership. After the railway was closed to freight traffic in October 1973, and the track was removed two years later. The tunnel was not demolished and remains in place. There have been proposals to reconnect the railway between Aberystwyth and Carmarthen which would use Pencader Tunnel.
