= Manchester and Milford Railway =

Former Welsh railway company

The Manchester and Milford Railway (M&MR) was a Welsh railway company, intended to connect Manchester and the industrial areas of North West England with a deep-water port on Milford Haven, giving an alternative to the Port of Liverpool.

Despite the title, it was planned to connect other railways at Llanidloes and Pencader, near Carmarthen, and achieve the object in its name by connections with other lines, most of which were only planned. The M&MR had continuous difficulty in raising capital and also in operating profitably but, thanks to a wealthy supporter, it opened from Pencader to Lampeter in 1866. Realising that its originally intended route to Llanidloes would be unprofitable, it diverted the course at the north end to Aberystwyth, which it reached in 1867.

Sunk by financial difficulties, it was eventually absorbed into the Great Western Railway in 1911. Passenger operation ceased in 1964 and milk trains ran to a creamery until final closure in 1973.

== Early schemes ==
In the early years of the nineteenth century, Manchester and the surrounding districts had become dominant in many manufacturing industries, particularly textiles. As the volume of the trade increased, the import of raw materials, and the export and coastal transport of finished goods assumed an ever more important consideration in the industrial process. The Port of Liverpool was conveniently located and became the chief west coast port, and as trade with the Americas developed, Liverpool grew in importance.

The cost and time taken for transport to and from Liverpool was nevertheless significant, and the existing waterborne transport routes were expensive and slow. In 1830 the Liverpool and Manchester Railway was opened, immediately becoming a financial and commercial success. Although it was prime, Liverpool was not the only west coast port—it was rivalled by Bristol—but the thoughts of some business people turned to alternatives, and in 1845 the Manchester and Milford Haven Railway was proposed. This would create a new deep water port on Milford Haven Waterway in south-west Wales, and build a railway line connecting to Manchester. Milford Haven had the advantage of being located further southwest than Liverpool, with a corresponding shortening of the sea passage. The route was to start at Crewe, already connected to Manchester by the Manchester and Birmingham Railway, and run by way of Oswestry, Devil's Bridge, Lampeter and Haverfordwest. The line was to be broad gauge although the difficulties of the break of gauge at the northern end were not clearly elucidated.

By planning to build a line to Milford Haven, the company would have been in conflict with the South Wales Railway, which had issued a prospectus the previous year (1844) for a line connecting the Great Western Railway and Fishguard, also with a view to the transatlantic trade although mainly focused on communication with Ireland. The South Wales Railway was engineered by Isambard Kingdom Brunel and Brunel began to have doubts about Fishguard, and he too adopted Neyland, a port on Milford Haven. The South Wales Railway was built, but the Manchester and Milford Haven Railway came to nothing.

The scheme was to cost £2.6 million. The scheme "failed to materialize and lay dormant for several years, during which time other companies had covered the intended route, except for the 51 miles [82 km] through central Wales from Llanidloes to Pencader."

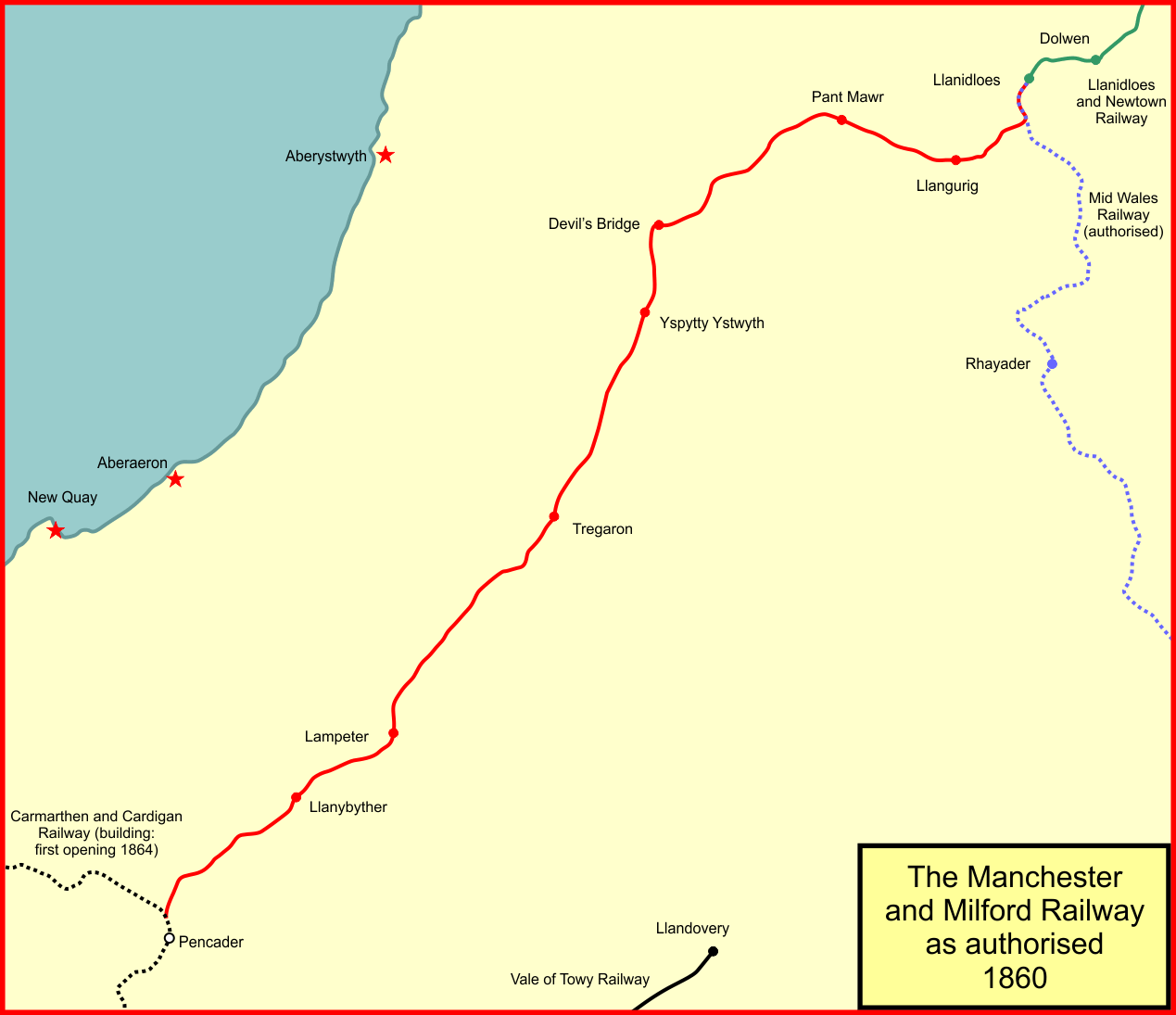
Map of the Manchester and Milford Railway, as first authorised by Parliament

This was the time of the "railway mania", when money was cheap and any number of railway schemes were put forward. The blank area on the map without mainline railways and the west-facing expanse of coast in Cardigan Bay proved alluring to railway promoters. Contemporary with the M&MR scheme was a North and South Wales and Worcester Railway, which proposed construction from Carmarthen to Aberystwyth and Machynlleth; it too failed to progress, and these proposals were followed by a series of schemes for linking the industrial northwest England with southwest Wales. The barrier of the Cambrian Mountains proved an engineering challenge which in many cases was underestimated at the planning stage.

The Carmarthen and Cardigan Railway was promoted to connect Cardigan to the South Wales Railway and thence the railway network. It was authorised by the Carmarthen and Cardigan Railway Act 1854 (17 & 18 Vict. c. ccxviii) in 1854, although only for a line between Carmarthen and Newcastle Emlyn. Extension to Cardigan, and construction of a deep water port there, was to follow later. The Carmarthen and Cardigan Railway was presumed to be a useful ally in what might become a chain of railways, shortening the extent of new construction necessary between Manchester and the port.

== The Manchester and Milford Railway authorised ==
By 1859 the idea of what was now to be the Manchester and Milford Railway was taking shape; it was to be built from Llanidloes "accessible from the north via either the Great Western Railway or the London and North Western Railway" to Pencader, where it would join the Carmarthen and Cardigan Railway.

The prospectus was enthusiastic:

Railways are now either made or in course of construction from Manchester to Welshpool. Two lines converge at the latter town, one by way of Chester and Oswestry in the Great Western interest, and the other by way of Shrewsbury in the London & North Western interest... From Welshpool railways are either opened or being constructed southward to Llanidloes.

The proposed Manchester & Milford Railway commences at Llanidloes and passes by the Devil's Bridge, through the Lead Mining Country, and through Cardiganshire, by Tregaron and Lampeter to a junction with the Carmarthen & Cardigan Railway at Pencader, near Newcastle Emlyn. From this point the Carmarthen & Cardigan Railway is in course of construction to Carmarthen, there joining the South Wales Railway, which is complete to [Neyland].

The proposed line is 51 1/2 miles [83 km] long, on the narrow gauge [i.e. standard gauge], uniting the north and south railways between Manchester and Milford, by the shortest route. To prevent a break of gauge near Carmarthen, it will be necessary to lay down an extra rail on the Carmarthen and Cardigan Railway, a portion of the South Wales Railway, and the Milford [Haven branch] Railway. The first and last of these companies consent, and it is not known or expected that the South Wales Railway will object. The distance between Manchester and Milford would then be about 207 miles [333 km].

Manchester and Milford Railway Act 1860
- Act of Parliament
- Parliament of the United Kingdom
- Long title: An Act for making a Railway from Llanidloes in the County of Montgomery to Pencader in the County of Carmarthen, and for other Purposes.
- Citation: 23 & 24 Vict. c. clxxv

Dates
- Royal assent: 23 July 1860

Llanidloes was on the Llanidloes and Newtown Railway, opened in 1859, and the access to the GWR and LNWR was by no means as clear cut as suggested. The running powers beyond the extremities of the line were not secured. Construction and land acquisition costs were understated and traffic earnings to be expected were overstated, but on 23 July 1860 the Manchester and Milford Railway was authorised by Parliament in the Manchester and Milford Railway Act 1860 (23 & 24 Vict. c. clxxv), with share capital of £555,000. An apparently firm arrangement had already been made with Frederick Beeston to construct the line for £447,000.

== Construction ==
David Davies and Thomas Savin were prominent railway contractors in Wales at the time, and offered to take shares in the concern as payment for construction of the northern part of the line. The company appear to have invited Savin to meet Beeston to discuss the sharing of the contract work, but unsurprisingly Beeston declined. Raising subscriptions to fund the construction of the line proved exceedingly difficult, and throughout its life the line was under-capitalised.

The main physical obstacle was the great mass of the Cambrian Mountains just south of Plynlimon, separating West Wales from the Severn Valley; it was to be tunnelled as part of the 50-mile (80 km) section between Llanidloes and Pencader. The Mid-Wales Railway (MWR) had been authorised in 1859 to build from Llanidloes to Newbridge-on-Wye, and the Manchester and Milford now realised that the other company's authorised alignment was largely over the same terrain as its own for two miles (3 km) miles or so from Llanidloes south to a place called Penpontbren. The M&MR's reaction was to persuade Frederick Beeston to build that section at once, so as to preempt the intentions of the MWR, which had not done much in its first year. Beeston agreed to do this for £30,000 and £10,000 in paid-up shares; this was accepted by the M&MR, but the company did not have that amount of cash available, and persuaded Beeston to take the payment in instalments, and in paid-up shares at a 33% discount. All this was contingent on the M&MR acquiring the land, but the MWR was already negotiating with landowners, and the idea of stealing a march on the MWR was impossible. An uninspiring series of disingenuous proposals followed, eventually leading to legal action. At length the solution was arrived at: the Llanidloes and Newtown Railway (L&NR) had been authorised in 1859 to build east from Llanidloes, and was in the process of construction; indeed the M&MR always planned to make an end-on junction with it. If the L&NR were to build the section of disputed route (as far south as Penpontbren), and make that part of its line available solely to the M&MR and the MWR, then the problem would be solved. A parliamentary bill for the Llanidloes and Newtown Railway was prepared for the 1862 session, and it was authorised in that year. The two companies were to pay it 5% per annum on capital, and there was to be a joint station at Llanidloes; the Manchester and Milford was to pay a third of the running costs of the station and interest on its capital cost.

The L&NR pressed ahead with construction, and the section to Penpontbren and the joint Llanidloes station were completed in February 1864, and the L&NR transferred its own trains to the joint station, demoting its own terminus to a goods station. The Mid-Wales Railway too was building its line, and opened this part of it in September 1864, from which date it started using the "shared" route section and the joint station. Meanwhile the M&MR set about building west from Penpontbren; it managed three miles (5 km) as far as the village of Llangurig, which was completed in 1864, construction then being halted. The section was laid with double track; only one goods is train is known to have reached Llangurig station. West from the village there was to be a 1 3/8-mile-long (2.2 km) tunnel under Banc Merin (on which construction actually began) from Cae Gaer Roman fort to the Afon Merin valley; then another, and before reaching the coastal plain of West Wales it would have crossed a viaduct 280 feet (85 m) high over the Afon Ystwyth at Pont-rhyd-y-groes.

Hopes of one day completing the line remained, and meetings were held in 1872 proposing that, but it was a lost cause.

Relations with Frederick Beeston, the M&MR's contractor, were difficult, and it is obvious that the M&MR, having little money in the capital account, had been unable to secure the land necessary for Beeston to make much progress. Notwithstanding the contract with Beeston (part of which was transferred by agreement to his son, Frederick Beeston Jnr, in 1861), the company now negotiated with Savin over taking on much of the construction. Savin was prepared to finance the work himself, taking shares in payment as well as £100,000 in cash at some later date. Beeston immediately sent a letter threatening a lawsuit if his preexisting contract were interfered with, and for the time being matters stalled.

Manchester and Milford Railway (Aberystwyth Branch) Act 1861
- Act of Parliament
- Parliament of the United Kingdom
- Long title: An Act to enable the Manchester and Milford Railway Company to construct a Branch Railway from the Devil's Bridge to Aberystwith; and for other Purposes.
- Citation: 24 & 25 Vict. c. cl

Dates
- Royal assent: 11 July 1861

The M&MR route as authorised was to run more or less direct from Lampeter through Tregaron and Devil's Bridge to Pant-mawr and Llanidloes. The intermediate terrain was thinly populated and had limited industrial activity, the objective being to connect Manchester and the port in southwest Wales as directly as possible. The M&MR now began to reconsider the wisdom of this, and decided to build to Aberystwyth from Devil's Bridge. Ignoring its great difficulty in raising capital, the M&MR obtained an act of Parliament, the Manchester and Milford Railway (Aberystwyth Branch) Act 1861 (24 & 25 Vict. c. cl) in July 1861 for this extension, with additional capital authorised of £110,000, and in November 1861 the company proposed a further branch, known as the Rhayader branch, and in the Parliamentary session of 1863 a harbour branch and other connections at Aberystwyth were being proposed. Now the route was to run along the east side of the River Teifi valley from Pencader via Llanybydder, Lampeter, Tregaron, Pontrhydfendigaid, Ysbyty Ystwyth and Pontrhydygroes to Devil's Bridge. There, a junction station would be constructed, with the main line proceeding to Llanidloes, and a branch line to Aberystwyth.

== Boardroom politics ==
The company had never succeeded in generating share subscriptions to carry out its construction. There were two strong personalities on the board, William Chambers and John Barrow, and it was their personal money and sureties that allowed any expenditure at all. At a shareholders' meeting in February 1863 all other directors were voted off, and friends and relatives of John Barrow were elected as directors. However there had not been a quorum at the meeting, and the decision was therefore supposedly in vain. Now the question arose of reimbursement of cash put forward by the two principals in the interests of the company, and allegations of financial impropriety were laid. By August 1863 the whole business was settled, with William Chambers leaving the board and John Barrow and his friends took over. The accounts for the period prior to this episode were clouded with controversy, but more pressing were two facts: that expenditure greatly exceeded income; and all the calls on the issued shares had been made. Moreover the next section of construction was to be the most challenging in engineering terms, involving two tunnels together 1 1/2 miles (2.4 km), and an exceptionally large viaduct.

The money to build this section was not available: at the end of 1863 only £7,953 had been received in subscriptions from shareholders out of authorised capital of £666,000. Moreover £41,760 worth of shares had been issued to the contractors and landowners, and £9,563 had been obtained in loans.

== Changing the route ==
The financial situation encouraged an alteration to the intended route. By now the company had completed the line to Llangurig and the Llanidloes and Newtown Railway had connected to that. A more southerly alignment to get to Llangurig was proposed, forming a triangular junction with the authorised Aberystwyth branch where it intersected at Ystrad Meurig. The new alignment involved 3 1/2 miles (6 km) of 1 in 30 and five miles (8 km) of 1 in 45; these gradients were on what was intended to be a trunk railway line. At the southern end the line was still to end abruptly at Pencader, where there was no mention of onward running powers over the Carmarthen and Cardigan Railway (C&CR).

Manchester and Milford Railway Act 1865
- Act of Parliament
- Parliament of the United Kingdom
- Long title: An Act to authorize the Manchester and Milford Railway Company to make certain new Railways in substitution for Part of their authorized Railway and Aberystwith Branch; and to extend the Time for the Purchase of Lands and Completion of Part of their authorized Line; and to give various other Powers to the said Company and to other Railway Companies; and for other Purposes.
- Citation: 28 & 29 Vict. c. cccv

Dates
- Royal assent: 5 July 1865

Text of statute as originally enacted

Swansea and Aberystwith Junction Railway Act 1864
- Act of Parliament
- Parliament of the United Kingdom
- Long title: An Act to incorporate a Company for the making of Railways in the Counties of Carmarthen and Cardigan, to be called "The Swansea and Aberystwith Junction Railway."
- Citation: 27 & 28 Vict. c. clxxv

Dates
- Royal assent: 14 July 1864

Swansea and Aberystwith Junction Railway Amendment Act 1865
- Act of Parliament
- Parliament of the United Kingdom
- Long title: An Act for conferring further Powers on the Swansea and Aberystwith Junction Railway Company.
- Citation: 28 & 29 Vict. c. ccxi

Dates
- Royal assent: 5 July 1865

Text of statute as originally enacted

At this stage two other railways, the Mid-Wales Railway and the Swansea and Aberystwith Junction Railway (S&AJR), were planning lines in the area. After considerable jockeying for position, in October 1864 there was agreement to work jointly and present parliamentary bills that did not conflict. This meant that the M&MR only required to build to Aberystwyth with a short stub to Ysbyty Ystwyth, and could rely on the MWR to build the connection to Llangurig (already reached by the M&MR) as well as the MWR's own eastward route. All three companies got their authorising acts of Parliament in 1865, (the Manchester and Milford Railway Act 1865 (28 & 29 Vict. c. cccv) on 5 July), but the S&AJR almost immediately gave up for want of subscriptions. The M&MR was able to reduce its intended capital by £175,000 while the MWR took on an additional £380,000, way beyond any realistic possibility of raising the sum. This time the act of Parliament compelled the 7 ft 1/4 in (2,140 mm) broad gauge Carmarthen and Cardigan Railway to lay a third rail to enable the passage of M&MR 4 ft 8 1/2 in (1,435 mm) standard gauge, narrow gauge in this context, trains, and grant running powers to do so to Carmarthen from Pencader.

The section of line from Llangurig to Penpontbren, about three miles (4.8 km), was completed in 1863, including track and signals, but was never opened as a railway. It was finally dismantled about 1923.

== Opening the line ==
The Manchester and Milford Railway Act 1865 unlocked some loan capital but it must be presumed that John Barrow funded much of the construction with personal money; (Note: MacDermot says, "the money must have come from somewhere".) the line was completed and opened from Pencader to Lampeter, opening on 1 January 1866. (Note: Baughan says that Colonel Yolland of the Board of Trade inspected the line in December 1865 and refused sanction to open; that the line nonetheless opened on 1 January 1866; and that Yolland visited again on 24 January, noting the unauthorised opening; and merely referred to an undertaking to lengthen Pencader station platforms "within a fortnight".) the C&CR, itself lacking money, had not laid the necessary third rail for through running, and the M&MR instructed its own contractor to lay the rail, as authorised in the Manchester and Milford Railway Act 1865.

M&MR trains were extended over the C&CR to Carmarthen on 1 November 1866.

Onwards to Strata Florida, the line was opened on 1 September 1866. Ystrad Meurig was retitled Strata Florida after a local ruined abbey. The third rail to Carmarthen was ready at the end of August as well.

The entire route of 41 miles (66 km) was ready to be opened throughout, and this was done for passenger and goods trains on 12 August 1867. The construction and ancillary expenditure amounted to £700,000, of which £75,000 was on the Llangurig section, now abandoned. The train service consisted of three trains between Carmarthen and Aberystwyth each way Monday to Friday. At first the service was operated by the contractors, using three Sharp-Stewart locomotives.

Considering itself to be a trunk line, the M&MR publicity quoted connections from Liverpool and Manchester to Milford Haven via Aberystwyth. Before the 1867 opening this took two full days, and was a little shortened after that. At first the M&MR trains could not run south of Pencader. The M&MR cultivated the Pembroke and Tenby Railway (P&TR) as an ally, and quoted journeys from Tenby northwards that involved travelling west to Pembroke and crossing to Neyland GWR station, as the P&TR had not opened to Whitland yet.

The train service on the M&MR remained pitifully slow, and onward connections were not easily made so that the Manchester to Milford Journey in mixed trains attaching wagons at wayside stations, was not pleasant for passengers.

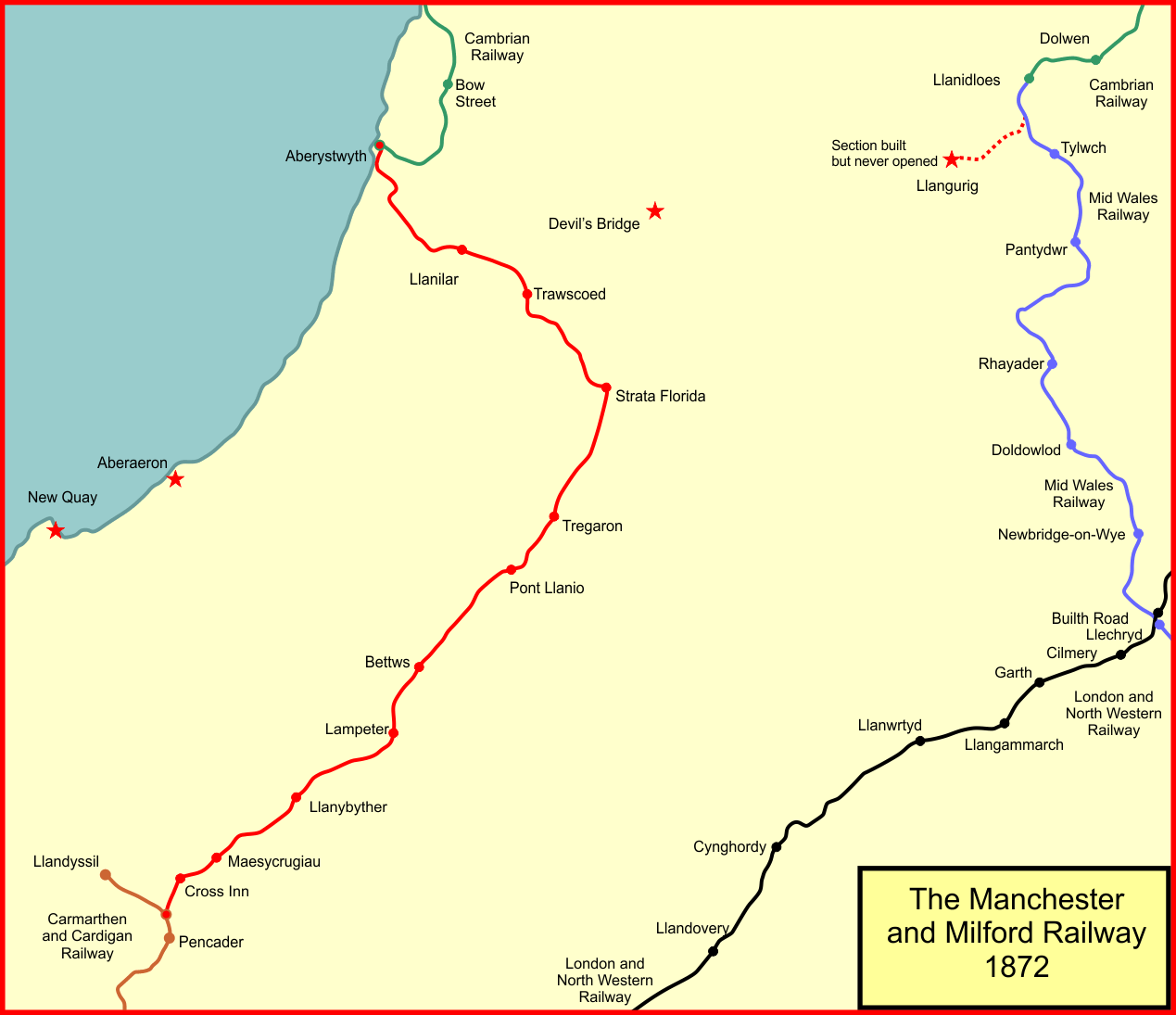
System map of the Manchester and Milford Railway in 1872

From the end of July 1872, passenger trains ceased running south of Pencader; this was probably due to extreme financial difficulties forcing a reduction in running costs. (Note: According to Holden this took place in mid-1873.)

The Mid-Wales Railway should have been extending westwards to Ysbyty Ystwyth to connect with the authorised M&MR section to that place; but as there was no sign of that happening, the M&MR did not waste money on its own section of the route. Instead it decided to build a branch to Devil's Bridge; not yet a tourist attraction, it had mineral deposits in the vicinity. The M&MR got an act of Parliament, the Manchester and Milford Railway (Devil's Bridge Branch) Act 1873 (36 & 37 Vict. c. viii), giving authority for this. £40,000 of capital was allowed to build the 7-mile (11 km) line from Trawsgoed. There proved to be no possibility of raising the money for this line and powers for abandonment were obtained in the Manchester and Milford Railway (Devil's Bridge Branch Abandonment) Act 1880 (43 & 44 Vict. c. lxv).

== Financial crisis ==
At Aberystwyth, the M&MR was using the Aberystwyth and Welsh Coast Railway's station by agreement, and was due to pay a charge for the usage, laid down in the Aberystwith and Welsh Coast Railway Act 1863 (26 & 27 Vict. c. cxli). Similarly it had undertaken to pay a charge for its use of the Llanidloes station built by the Llanidloes and Newtown Railway. The M&MR had agreed to the arrangement when Llanidloes was to be on its main line, although that had long been abandoned. The Cambrian Railways, as successor to both the other railways, managed to get the Llanidloes joint line and station declared "open" to traffic (a necessary stage in charging for its use) on 1 August 1872. When the bills came in six months later the M&MR failed to pay and the Cambrian sued, and won. By July 1875 the M&MR owed £1,700 and the Cambrian arranged to have powers to seize the M&MR rolling stock. The M&MR was obliged to pay immediately.

These issues were only part of the financial problem that the line faced, having almost no conventional share capital other than that funded directly by John Barrow, and having taken out extremely large loans, on which unpaid interest was accruing at £8,000 a year over and above ordinary profit and loss. In mid-1875, £62,500 in arrears of interest were owing, and the company went into administration.

The Manchester and Milford tried to claim against the Mid-Wales Railway, which, it contended, should have built the connecting line from Llangurig to Strata Florida, which would have enabled the M&MR to use the expensively acquired rights at Llanidloes, but the attempt was rejected in the House of Lords.

There followed a long period of unedifying board disagreements with the receiver, and improbable schemes that supposedly would resolve the company's financial ailments. The very thin train service in this period was three mixed trains a day over the line, still with connections shown from Manchester and Liverpool but indicating a very exhausting and uncertain journey. In 1880 an initiative was taken to run the trains to time, which appears to have been successfully implemented.

Income slightly improved in this time, and some work was done on relaying the track with recovered materials from the disused Llangurig spur line. In 1888 there was a surplus on operating account of £5,750, but all of the "profit" was eaten up immediately by backlogs of rent and interest charges; the backlog continued to increase. However the Regulation of Railways Act 1889 required the installation of block signalling interlocking of points and signals, and continuous brakes on passenger trains; all of this would cost money that the M&MR did not have.

== Lease to the GWR ==
It had long been obvious that there was no self-created escape from the M&MR's financial difficulty. In 1896 negotiations with the Great Western Railway (GWR) took place, but the M&MR's anticipated price was way too high. The discussions were resumed in 1903 with a similar outcome. Much of the problem was the prior debt owed to the Cambrian Railways, which any purchaser would have to factor into their calculations. Conversely it was obvious that the rolled up debt was never going to be paid by the M&MR, so that the Cambrian as creditor was also in a weak position. In October 1903 the Great Western Railway and the Cambrian Railways discussed what progress might be made in one of them taking over the M&MR. At first the discussions were cordial, but the M&MR played them off. In the 1904 session of Parliament a bill was passed which had the effect of eliminating the M&MR debt to the Cambrian, as a first step towards an agreed transfer, but the M&MR then finalised a deal with the Great Western, to start on 1 July 1905. As well as resolving the historic debt issues, the GWR would pay 19% of gross receipts. The M&MR had to get the sanction of the Court of Chancery, and this was withheld until the Cambrian had had a chance to comment; they were offering 25% of receipts.

Manchester and Milford Railway (Leasing) Act 1906
- Act of Parliament
- Parliament of the United Kingdom
- Long title: An Act for authorising a lease of the Manchester and Milford Railway to the Great Western Railway Company and for other purposes.
- Citation: 6 Edw. 7. c. x)

Dates
- Royal assent: 29 May 1906

Text of statute as originally enacted

The matter was not quickly resolved, but the Cambrian was regarded locally as an inefficient monopoly, and it had not paid a dividend for some time. Its 25% was thought to be shaky compared with the solid 19% of the GWR. With the Cambrian accepting £11,000 in settlement of past and future liabilities on the Llanidloes line, progress was at last possible and in May 1906 an amended bill sanctioning the transfer (actually a 999-year lease) to the GWR, the Manchester and Milford Railway (Leasing) Act 1906 (6 Edw. 7. c. x), was passed, to be effective from 1 July 1906.

At this time the company's fleet consisted of eight engines, fourteen carriages and 117 goods vehicles.

== Operated by the GWR ==
While the baseline traffic on the line was difficult to augment, the Great Western Railway fostered an increase in tourist traffic, especially from South Wales, on the line. In addition, useful motor coach connections were operated by the GWR to the seaside towns of Aberaeron and New Quay. A slip coach working was inaugurated:

"Slip" coaches are by no means a modern introduction, to railway workers but until recently they were un-known in South Wales. The acquisition of the Manchester and Milford Railway, and the opening of the Fishguard route to Ireland, enabled the Great Western Railway to give an improved service to Aberystwyth by means of a "slip" off the down morning boat express. The "slip" which is detached at Carmarthen Junction, is the first seen in South Wales, and the "slipping" is daily watched by a large number of local railwayacs, who are much interested in the novelty.

== Lampeter, Aberayron and New Quay Light Railway ==
The coastal town of Aberaeron had long been considered to merit a railway branch line; the Vale of Rheidol Railway had intended to connect the town without success. In 1903 the idea for a light railway took shape, and in April 1911 the Lampeter, Aberayron and New Quay Light Railway was opened to traffic. It was worked from the outset by the Great Western Railway and the existing station facilities at Lampeter, which became the junction station, were considered to be adequate to handle the traffic. The actual junction, named Aberayron Junction, was 1 1/2 miles (2.4 km) north of the station. Notwithstanding the reference to New Quay in the company's title, no extension to that place was built.

== Takeover by the GWR ==
The GWR spent £57,000 on bringing the M&MR line up to a workable standard in the initial years of the lease. Discussions about a full takeover took place, as the M&MR Company was now only a financial shell. Unpaid debenture interest and loans amounted to £400,000 and the operating profit on the line did not leave enough surplus to pay current liabilities.

Manchester and Milford Railway (Vesting) Act 1911
- Act of Parliament
- Parliament of the United Kingdom
- Long title: An Act for amalgamating the undertaking of the Manchester and Milford Railway Company with the undertaking of the Great Western Railway Company and for other purposes.
- Citation: 1 & 2 Geo. 5. c. xv

Dates
- Royal assent: 2 June 1911

Text of statute as originally enacted

The merger was inevitable (Note: It is difficult to see what advantage the GWR derived from all this, other than preventing dominance at Aberystwyth by the Cambrian Railways and their ally the London and North Western Railway.) and on 1 July 1911 the absorption of the company by the GWR took legal effect by the Manchester and Milford Railway (Vesting) Act 1911 (1 & 2 Geo. 5. c. xv) of 2 June 1911. (Note: Baughan says 18 August 1911.) There were some trailing issues of financial clearing up for the residual M&MR but the GWR took on responsibility for resolving the issues surrounding the uncompleted Llangurig extension.

In the 1930s the passenger traffic on the line was further developed with five trains daily over the line, and additional services on summer Saturdays. During World War II the passenger service was reduced, but there was heavy munitions traffic running southbound.

== After 1948 ==
At the beginning of 1948 the main line railways of Great Britain were taken into public ownership, under British Railways. The transfer brought relatively little change to the line, although some more modern engine power was brought in.

A holiday camp opened at Penychain, near Pwllheli, in 1947; it was known as Butlin's Pwllheli, and it generated considerable seasonal passenger traffic. On summer Saturdays in the later 1950s and early 1960s through trains from Swansea or Carmarthen ran via the M&MR to Aberystwyth and thence along the coast line to Pwllheli. For example the summer 1960 public timetable for the Western Region of British Railways shows this train running on high summer Saturdays only at 10.10 am from Swansea to Pwllheli, calling at Carmarthen, Pencader, Lampeter and Aberystwyth; it reversed at Aberystwyth and again at Dovey Junction and arrived at Penychain (for the holiday camp) at 4.56 pm and Pwllheli at 5.05 pm. The southbound train ran from Penychain (10.18 am) to Carmarthen (3.55 pm) only, following the same route.

== Closure ==
The low baseline traffic levels on the line led to long-standing doubts about its future, and when the Beeching Report, The Reshaping of British Railways, was issued in 1963 it proposed that the line should close to traffic throughout. Attention was drawn to the social implications, in an area in need of commercial development, but the huge losses incurred by the line were dominant. During December 1963 the goods facilities at many stations were withdrawn, followed by more closures on 14 March 1964.

On 14 December 1964 severe flooding of the River Ystwyth took place at Llanilar, severing the line there, and resulting in the immediate closure of the line north of Strata Florida. Formal closure of the passenger traffic on the whole line followed on 22 February 1965. Goods trains worked only as far as Pont Llanio where there was a creamery at Felin-fach, and Lampeter station became the railhead for general goods traffic. The Pont Llanio milk workings continued until the middle of 1970, and in October 1970 closure of that section took place. Green Grove on the Aberaeron branch continued to generate milk traffic until the end of September 1973, when the entire system closed.

The bay platform at Aberystwyth normally used by M&MR passenger trains is now used by Vale of Rheidol Railway trains.

== Present ==
A 21 miles (34 km) section from Aberystwyth to Tregaron now forms the Ystwyth Trail in Ceredigion.

== Locomotives ==
Seven locomotives were acquired by the GWR in 1911, with the M&MR by now operating only 10 locomotives:

1. London & North Western Railway 0-6-0 built at Crewe in August 1880 as L&NWR 2387. Given GW No 1338 and lasted until December 1915.
2. Plynlimmon, Sharp Stewart 2-4-2T Wks No 3710. Given GW No 1304 and lasted until July 1916.
3. Lady Elizabeth, Sharp Stewart 2-4-0 Wks No 1756, delivered in July 1866. Allocated GW No 1305, it was sold immediately.
4. Aberystwyth, Manning Wardle 0-6-0 Wks No 255, delivered in July 1868. Given GW No 1339, withdrawn December 1906.
5. Sharp Stewart 0-6-0 Wks No 2036 in July 1870. Allocated 1340 but withdrawn in August 1906.
6. Cader Idris, Sharp Stewart 2-4-2T Wks No 4128. Given GW No 1306 and lasted until April 1919.
7. London & North Western Railway 0-6-0 built at Crewe in November 1889 as L&NWR 1095. Given GW No 1341 and lasted until November 1906.
8. Great Western Railway 2301 Class (Deans Goods) 0-6-0 (ex GW 2301) on loan from summer 1905.
9. Great Western Railway 2301 Class (Deans Goods) 0-6-0 (ex GW 2351) on loan from summer 1905.
10. Great Western Railway 2301 Class (Deans Goods) 0-6-0 (ex GW 2532) on loan from summer 1905.

Diesel locomotive operation on the line was introduced in 1963.

== Topography ==
Closure of passenger stations: except where shown, all passenger stations between New Quay Road and Alltddu Halt closed on 22 February 1965 and all passenger stations between Strata Florida and Llanrhystyd Road closed on 14 December 1964.

- (Pencader; Carmarthen and Cardigan Railway station)
- Pencader Junction; opened 1 January 1866; closed May 1880
- Cross Inn Llanfihangel; opened August 1869; renamed New Quay Road 1874; renamed Bryn Teifi 1916
- Maesycrugiau; opened 1 January 1866
- Llanybydder; opened 1 January 1866
- Pencarreg Halt; opened 9 June 1930
- Lampeter; opened 1 January 1866
- Aberayron Junction; junction for the Aberaeron line 1911 to 1973
- Bettws; opened 1 September 1866; renamed Derry Ormond 1874
- Llangybi; opened August 1869, at first for market days only
- Olmarch Halt; opened 7 December 1929; closed 22 February 1965
- Pont Llanio; opened 1 September 1866; closed 22 February 1965
- Tregaron; opened 1 September 1866
- Alltddu Halt; opened 23 September 1935
- Strata Florida; opened 1 January 1866
- Caradog Falls Halt; opened 5 September 1932
- Trawscoed; opened 12 August 1867
- Felindyffryn Halt; opened 10 June 1935
- Llanilar; opened 12 August 1867
- Llanrhystyd Road; opened 12 August 1867
- Aberystwyth; originally Aberystwith and West Coast Railway and later Cambrian Railways station; still open

There was a short branch at Aberystwyth serving St David's Quay there.

There were steep gradients throughout the line, and generally the steepest were between 1 in 50 and 1 in 75. The line climbed from Pencader Junction to Bryn Teifi and then fell steeply for two miles (3 km). From there it continued undulating, generally rising northwards as far as Strata Florida where a one-mile (1.6 km) climb at 1 in 46 took place. At the summit (at Corporation Siding) the line fell steeply at up to 1 in 41 for 4 1/2 miles (7 km), and then more gently, with another, shorter steep descent at Llanrhystyd Road.

Aberystwyth station was extensively modernised and remodelled in 1925. The work required the removal of the engine turntable, and a triangle was formed at the divergence of the former Cambrian and M&MR lines for engine turning purposes; the third side of the triangle was not a running line, and it was never used as a through avoiding line for Aberystwyth station.
