= John Evans (Methodist) =

Welsh Methodist (1779–1847)

John Evans of Llwynffortun (October 1779 – 6 October 1847), was a Welsh Methodist.

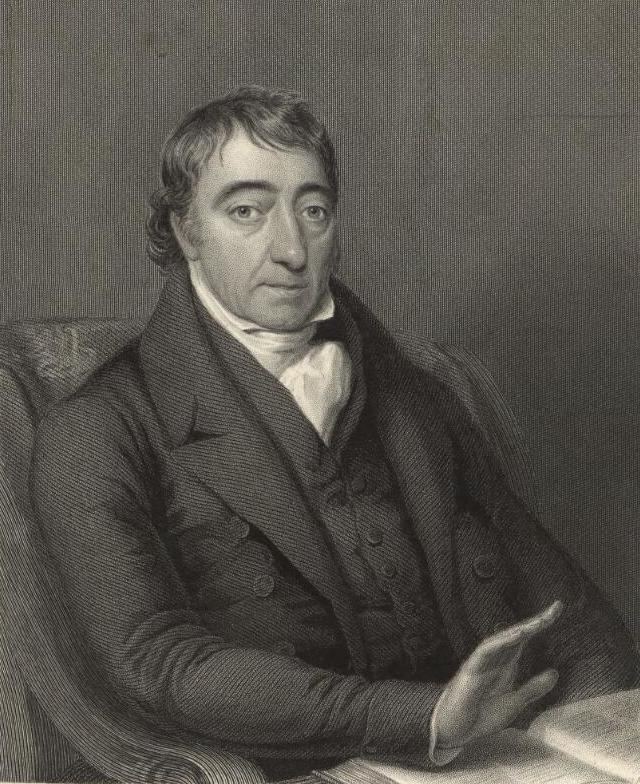
Portrait of Revd. John Evans, 1841

Evans was born at Cwmgwen, Pencader, Carmarthenshire, in October 1779. His parents gave him a religious education, and he could read his Bible when he was four. He was sent to the best schools within reach, and under one Jones of Maesnoni he is supposed to have learned Latin, Greek, and Hebrew. As a boy he often preached without hearers. His parents were members, and his father a deacon, of the independent church at Pencader. At the age of fourteen he was taken to hear Jones of Llangan, one of the great Methodist preachers of the day. At sixteen, when his father had failed to make an independent of him, he joined the Calvinistic Methodists.

At nineteen he went to the Presbyterian College, Carmarthen, but soon left, although his tutor thought highly of him. At twenty-nine he received deacon's orders, after examination, at the hands of Watson, bishop of Llandaff. He held several curacies in succession, but for short periods, and wherever he went he filled the churches. Great opposition was raised by some against his 'Methodistic ways.' His last curacy was at Llanddowror. He could not confine himself to his own church, and often preached off tombstones to crowded assemblies. He soon found, however, that the episcopal church was no proper place for him, and he returned to his old friends the Calvinistic Methodists, though he preached also among the baptists or congregationalists, and he was everywhere welcome and everywhere followed by an admiring multitude.

Evans had an imposing presence, an intelligent countenance, and courteous manners. He had a musical voice, and gave the impression of sincere religious feeling. Dr. Lewis Edwards says his one distinguishing mark was gracefulness. As he advanced in years he became much troubled with melancholia, and sometimes he had to be fetched from his bed to his pulpit duties. He died on 4 November 1847. Dr. Edwards describes him as one of the greatest of Welsh preachers.
