= Strata Florida railway station =

Former railway station in Wales

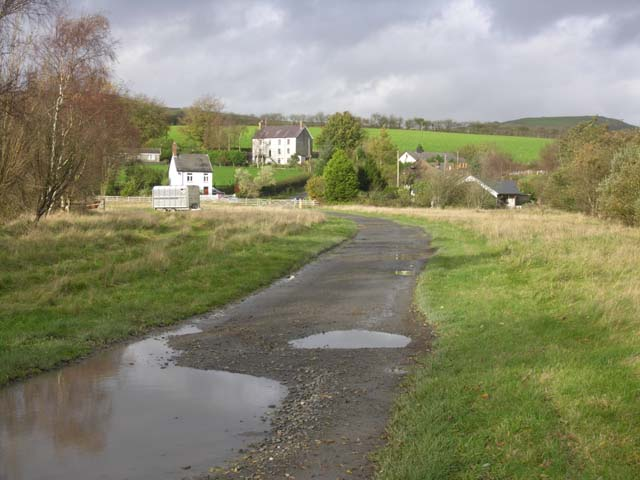
- Site of Strata Florida station

General information
- Location: Ystrad Meurig, Ceredigion; Wales
- Coordinates: 52.2872°N 3.8912°W
- Grid reference: SN7109567143
- Platforms: 2

Other information
- Status: Disused

History
- Original company: Manchester and Milford Railway
- Pre-grouping: Great Western Railway

Key dates
- 1 September 1866: Opened
- 22 February 1965: Closed
Location

Strata Florida was a railway station in Wales, on the former Carmarthen to Aberystwyth Line; it served the villages of Ystrad Meurig, Pontrhydfendigaid and Ffair Rhos. The Manchester and Milford Railway (M&MR) opened from Pencader to Aberystwyth on 12 August 1867; the line went into receivership from 1875 to 1900. The site is now part of the Ystwyth Trail, a shared-use rail trail between Aberystwyth and Tregaron.

== History ==
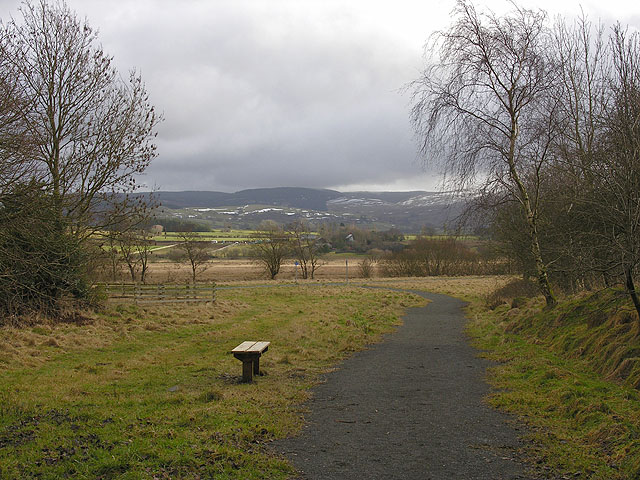
The Ystwyth Trail, near the old station.

=== The railway ===
The M&MR's original plan was to build a line through the mountains. One scheme involved the building of a six-mile tunnel to Llangurig, whence it would proceed to Llanidloes, reaching Manchester over other companies' lines through Moat Lane, Newtown, Welshpool, Oswestry, Whitchurch and Crewe. The required finance was not forthcoming and the prospect of such a route never being economic became apparent; only the section from Llangurig to Llanidloes was actually built. A line towards Aberystwyth, via Llanilar, was opened instead in 1867; from Aberystwyth, access to Moat Lane and onwards could be achieved, after a reversal, by way of Machynlleth and Caersws.

The Great Western Railway (GWR) took over the service in 1906 and fully absorbed the line in 1911. The station, and GWR, passed on to British Railways on nationalisation in 1948.

Although proposed for closure in the Beeching Report, the line closed in December 1964; this was due to serious damage caused by flooding south of Aberystwyth, near Llanilar station, in December 1964. The cost of repairs was deemed unjustified and led to the withdrawal of passenger services in February 1965; however, milk trains continued to run from Carmarthen to nearby Pont Llanio until 1970.

=== The station ===
The station was about 3 mi (4.8 km) from the old abbey of Strata Florida; Lord Lisburne of Trawsgoed, an influential local landowner, had tried to have the station named Ystrad Meurig after the village of that name. The station was built at a point where it could serve three local villages, but its location made railway access difficult. The station itself was positioned on a tight curve, although the line from the south took a straight course across the Cors Caron bog. On leaving the station, the branch line towards Aberystwyth climbed out of the Teifi valley at a gradient of 1:43 for about 1 mi (1.6 km) to the summit of the line, before falling for 4 mi (6.4 km) at 1:41 into the Ystwyth valley and Trawscoed.

The station had two platforms, basic buildings and a signal box. All have been demolished; there are a few artefacts remaining, including the stationmaster's house.

Preceding station	Disused railways	Following station
Alltddu Halt	Great Western Railway; Carmarthen to Aberystwyth Line	Caradog Falls Halt

== Today ==
Much of the route from Aberystwyth to Tregaron has now been turning into a walking and cycling route, the Ystwyth Trail.

== Sources ==
- Butt, R. V. J. (October 1995). The Directory of Railway Stations: details every public and private passenger station, halt, platform and stopping place, past and present (1st ed.). Sparkford: Patrick Stephens Ltd. ISBN 978-1-85260-508-7. OCLC 60251199. OL 11956311M.
