= Maesycrugiau railway station =

Former railway station in Wales

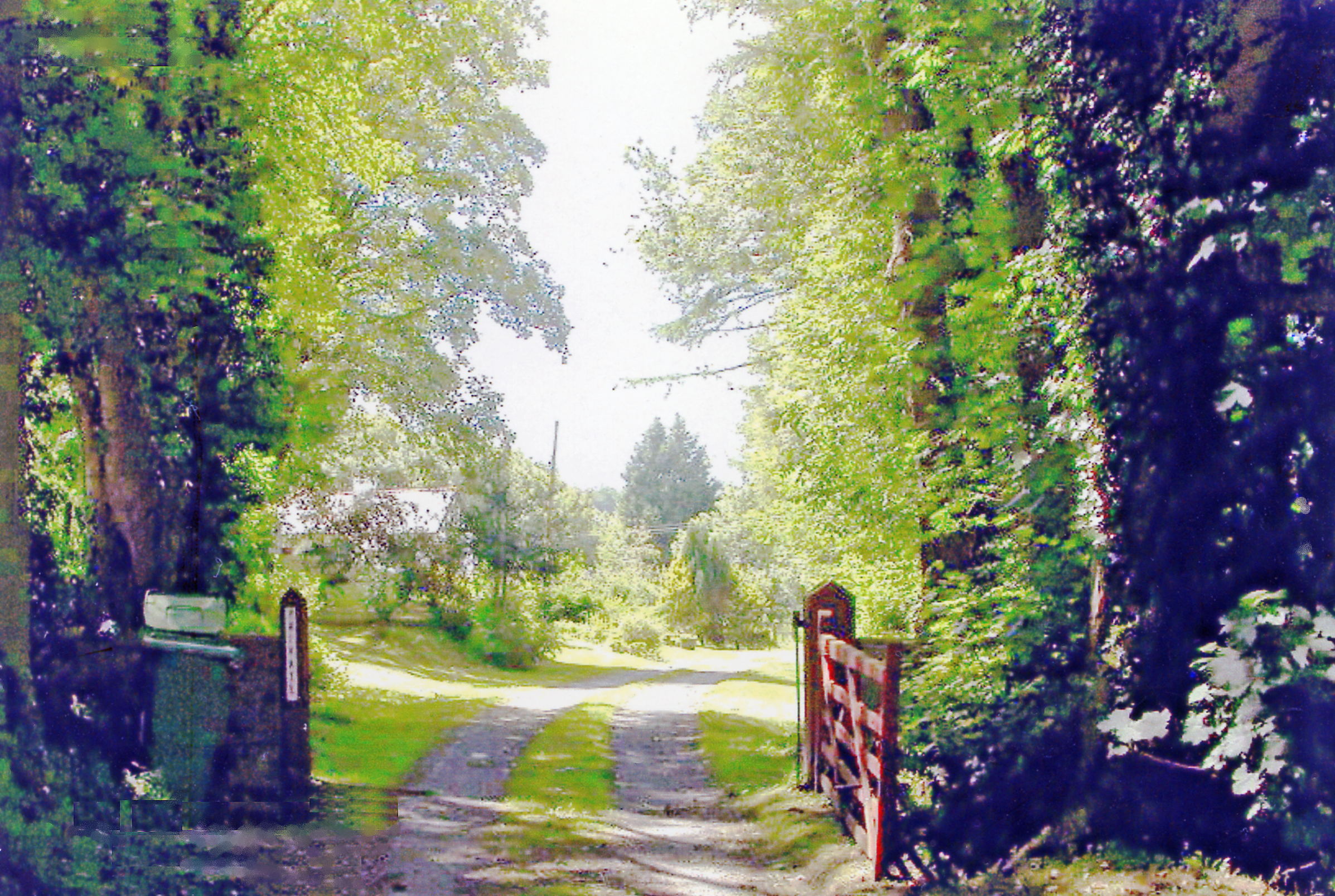
- Site of the station in 2004

General information
- Location: Maesycrugiau, Carmarthen; Wales
- Coordinates: 52.0443°N 4.2265°W
- Grid reference: SN4740140774
- Platforms: 2

Other information
- Status: Disused

History
- Original company: Manchester and Milford Railway
- Pre-grouping: Great Western Railway

Key dates
- 1 January 1866: Opened
- 22 February 1965: Closed
Location

Maesycrugiau railway station also Maes-y-crugiau railway station served the hamlet and rural locale of Maesycrugiau near Llanllwni on the Carmarthen Aberystwyth Line in the Welsh county of Carmarthen.

== History ==
The Manchester and Milford Railway (M&MR) opened from Pencader to Aberystwyth on 12 August 1867. The line went into receivership from 1875 to 1900.

The Great Western Railway took over the service in 1906, and fully absorbed the line in 1911. The Great Western Railway and the station passed on to British Railways on nationalisation in 1948. It was then closed by the British Railways Board.

The OS map shows that the station had a signal box, goods yard, and a passing loop.

On 19 August 1890, due to boiler defects and poor design, an engine boiler exploded whilst at Maesycrugiau. No one was injured in the accident.

Born in 1871, Evan Davies recalled that Maesycrugiau was "a one man Station, single Iine, and the Station-master was the porter, signalman and all, pleased to have a bit of help to shunt the trucks from us boys".

The station house is still present as is the nearby Railway Inn.

Preceding station	Disused railways	Following station
Bryn Teifi	Great Western Railway; Carmarthen to Aberystwyth Line	Llanybyther
