= Olmarch =

Village in Ceredigion, Wales

Coordinates: 52.177509°N 4.012824°W

- Location within Ceredigion
- OS grid reference: SN 6246 5516
  - Cardiff: 59.9 mi (96.4 km)
  - London: 172.1 mi (277.0 km)
- Community: Llangybi
- Principal area: Ceredigion
- Country: Wales
- Sovereign state: United Kingdom
- Post town: Aberaeron
- Postcode district: SA48
- Police: Dyfed-Powys
- Fire: Mid and West Wales
- Ambulance: Welsh
- UK Parliament: Ceredigion Preseli
- Senedd Cymru – Welsh Parliament: Ceredigion Penfro

Olmarch is a hamlet in the community of Llangybi, Ceredigion, Wales, which is 59.9 miles (96.4 km) from Cardiff and 172.1 miles (277 km) from London. Olmarch is represented in the Senedd by Elin Jones (Plaid Cymru) and the Member of Parliament is Ben Lake (Plaid Cymru).

== See also ==
- Olmarch Halt railway station
- List of localities in Wales by population
