= Rhos-y-garth =

Village in Ceredigion, Wales

Coordinates: 52.333923°N 4.002739°W

- Location within Ceredigion
- OS grid reference: SN 6364 7254
  - Cardiff: 68.7 mi (110.6 km)
  - London: 174.7 mi (281.2 km)
- Community: Llanilar
- Principal area: Ceredigion
- Country: Wales
- Sovereign state: United Kingdom
- Post town: Aberystwyth
- Postcode district: SY23
- Police: Dyfed-Powys
- Fire: Mid and West Wales
- Ambulance: Welsh
- UK Parliament: Ceredigion Preseli
- Senedd Cymru – Welsh Parliament: Ceredigion

Rhos-y-garth is a hamlet in the community of Llanilar, Ceredigion, Wales, which is 68.7 miles (110.6 km) from Cardiff and 174.7 miles (281.1 km) from London. Rhos-y-garth is represented in the Senedd by Elin Jones (Plaid Cymru) and is part of the Ceredigion Preseli constituency in the House of Commons.

== See also ==
- List of localities in Wales by population
