= Pont Llanio railway station =

Former railway station in Wales

Coordinates: 52°11′40.0″N 3°58′22.3″W

General information
- Location: Pont Llanio, Ceredigion; Wales
- Platforms: 1

Other information
- Status: Disused

History
- Original company: Manchester and Milford Railway
- Pre-grouping: Great Western Railway

Key dates
- 1 September 1866: Opened
- 22 February 1965: Closed for passengers
- 1970: closed completely
Location

Pont Llanio railway station was a railway station in Wales on the former Carmarthen to Aberystwyth Line near Llanddewi Brefi.

The railway station was built with only a single platform and building on the up side. The platform, small goods shed in the former yard and a cast-iron water tank was situated next to a creamery, built near the station in 1896. Producing 5 tonnes of butter per week by 1905, regular milk train services to the later Milk Marketing Board-owned plant allowed distribution all over the United Kingdom.

The Great Western Railway took over the service in 1906, and fully absorbed the line in 1911. The Great Western Railway and the station passed on to British Railways on nationalisation in 1948. It was then closed by the British Railways Board.

Although proposed for closure in the Beeching Report serious damage due to flooding south of Aberystwyth in December 1964 closed that section of line. The cost of repairs was deemed unjustified and led to the withdrawal of passenger services in February 1965, however milk trains continued to run from Carmarthen to Pont Llanio until 1970. Pont Llanio was the nearest station to the village of Llanddewi Brefi, which became well known as a result of the BBC comedy show Little Britain.

Preceding station	Disused railways	Following station
Olmarch Halt	Great Western Railway; Carmarthen to Aberystwyth Line	Tregaron
