= Llanilar railway station =

Former railway station in Wales

General information
- Location: Llanilar, Ceredigion; Wales
- Coordinates: 52.3585°N 4.0166°W
- Grid reference: SN6276375305
- Platforms: 1

Other information
- Status: Disused

History
- Original company: Manchester and Milford Railway
- Pre-grouping: Great Western Railway

Key dates
- 12 August 1867: Opened
- 14 December 1964: Closed
Location

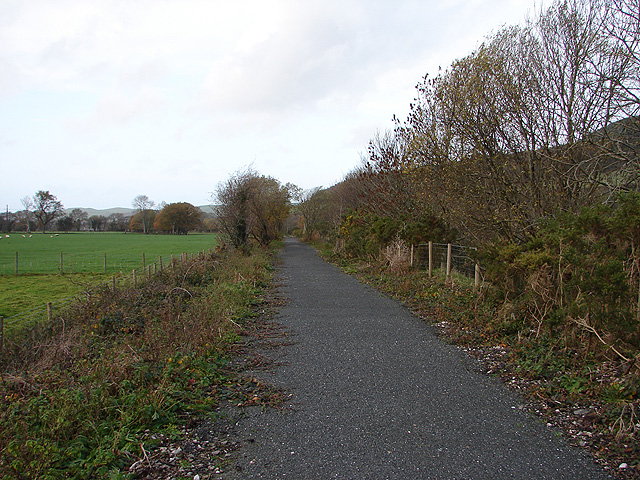
The course of the old railway near Llanilar.

Llanilar railway station was on the Carmarthen to Aberystwyth Line (originally called the Manchester and Milford Railway before being transferred to the Great Western Railway).

== History ==
The station opened in August 1867 to serve the nearby village. The station closed in December 1964 when services were truncated at Strata Florida, following flood damage by the River Ystwyth to the line one mile east of Llanilar. Formal closure was confirmed two months later. In 2017, both platforms survive, together with some of the original spear fencing. The station had a signal box set back from the platform, and a combined waiting room and ticket office. The goods yard had a weighbridge and several sidings.

Preceding station	Disused railways	Following station
Felindyffryn Halt	Great Western Railway; Carmarthen to Aberystwyth Line	Llanrhystyd Road
