= Ystrad Meurig =

Village and community in Ceredigion, Wales

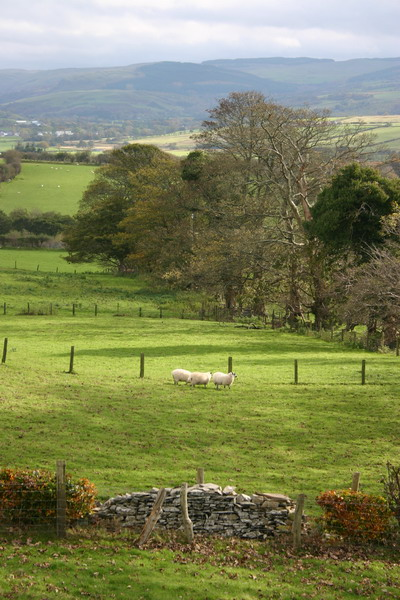

- Location within Ceredigion
- Population: 353 (2011)
- OS grid reference: SN706675
  - Cardiff: 90 mi (140 km) SE
- Community: Ystrad Meurig
- Principal area: Ceredigion
- Preserved county: Dyfed
- Country: Wales
- Sovereign state: United Kingdom
- Post town: YSTRAD MEURIG
- Postcode district: SY25
- Dialling code: 01974
- Police: Dyfed-Powys
- Fire: Mid and West Wales
- Ambulance: Welsh
- UK Parliament: Ceredigion Preseli
- Senedd Cymru – Welsh Parliament: Ceredigion Penfro
- List of places UK Wales Ceredigion 52.292774°N 3.898910°W Community map: Map of the community

Ystrad Meurig (or Ystradmeurig) is a village and community in Ceredigion, Wales. It lies on the B4340 road northwest of the town of Tregaron, on the edge of the Cambrian Mountains.

== History and amenities ==
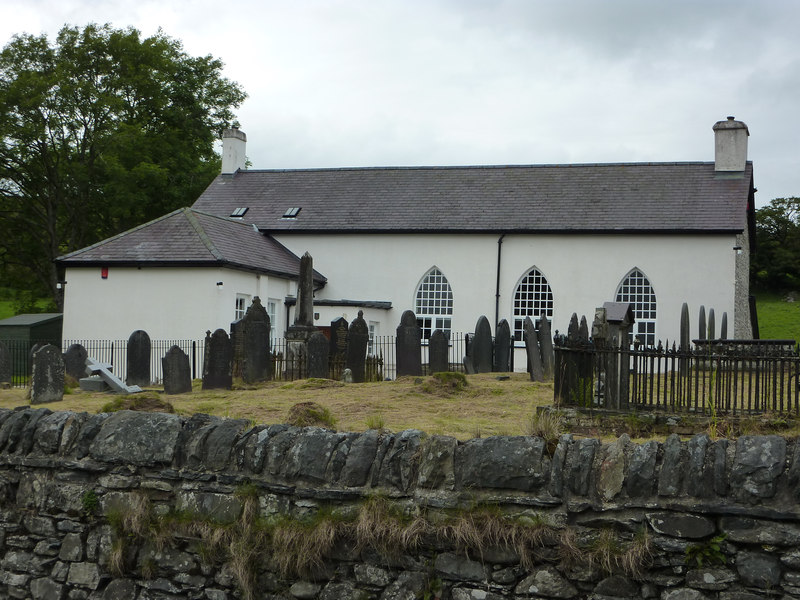
Edward Richard's Schoolhouse

Ystrad Meurig had a grammar school founded by Edward Richard (1714–1777) in about 1734. It subsequently offered pupils a course which included significant elements of classics and divinity. The school was thereby enabled to provide a basic training for many Welsh language speakers who wished to enter the ordained ministry — being one of the few establishments licensed for the purpose by the Bishop of St. David's. Later several former pupils were achieved considerable distinction within the Welsh church. This arrangement continued until the 1820s, when the existing school was finally superseded by a newly established college, which has since been transformed into the current University of Wales, Lampeter.

The grammar school at Ystrad Meurig later reverted to a more modest status as a school for the village and for the surrounding area, although it eventually adopted the name St. John's College, before finally closing in 1973. After lying almost derelict for some years, the building was more recently restored as a centre for the local community. It is a Grade II* listed building.

The village also contains the slight remains of what was thought to be a simple motte and bailey castle founded by Gilbert de Clare in the 12th century. Recent excavations by Lampeter University have shown that it was far more complex than this and it is now suggested that between the middle of the 6th century and the end of the 9th century this was once the site of the royal llys or hall complex of the Ceredigion kings and princes and that some of the earthworks at least are the remains of this. The llys was the centre of estates held by Welsh aristocrats of Trawsgoed both secular and ecclesiastical as they are identified in the Welsh laws and elsewhere.

The grade II listed chapel of St. John the Baptist in its present form dates from 1897. From 1866 up to 1965, Ystrad Meurig was served by the Strata Florida Railway Station, on the Carmarthen to Aberystwyth line — which had originally been proposed as a part of the Manchester and Milford Railway. Samuel Lewis reported that the population of the village was 109 in 1833.
