= Llanilar =

Village in Ceredigion, Wales

Coordinates: 52°21′N 4°01′W

- Village and community
- Llanilar

- Location within Ceredigion
- Principal area: Ceredigion
- Country: Wales
- Sovereign state: United Kingdom
- Police: Dyfed-Powys
- Fire: Mid and West Wales
- Ambulance: Welsh
- List of places UK Wales Ceredigion Community map: Map of the community

Llanilar (Welsh pronunciation: [ɬanˈɪlar]) is a village and community in Ceredigion, Wales, about 4 kilometres (2.5 mi) southeast of Aberystwyth. It is the eponym of the hundred of Ilar. The population at the 2021 census was 2,006. The community includes Rhos-y-garth.

== Name ==
In Welsh placenames, many smaller communities are named for their parish (llan), having grown up around the local church. This town's name honours its patron saint, although it is disputed whether that is the church's presumed founder Ilar (Welsh for "Hilary"), listed as a member of Cadfan's mission and a martyr but now almost totally forgotten, or the more famous Hilary who was bishop of Poitiers in France and is still celebrated by the Anglican and Catholic churches in Wales. (The confusion is not helped by Edward Williams's numerous forgeries which he included in the Iolo Manuscripts.)

== History and amenities ==
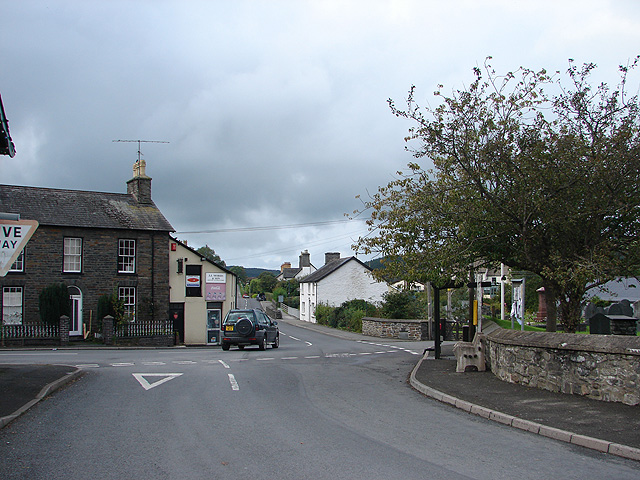
Downtown Llanilar

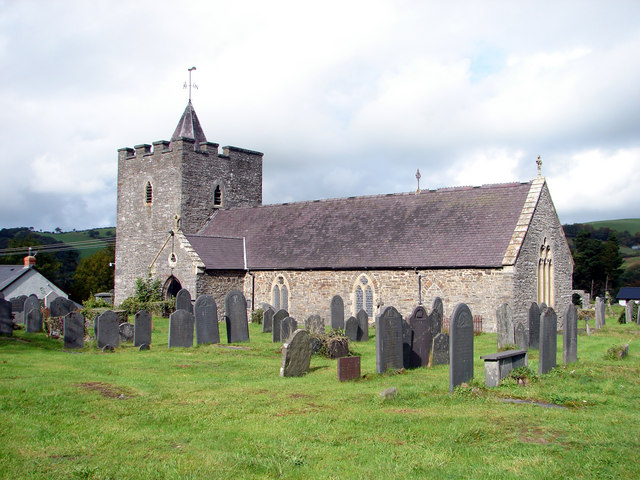
St Hilary's Church

The village was built along the southern side of the scenic River Ystwyth and contains The Falcon Inn, a parish church, Nonconformist chapel, primary school, GP Surgery, and garage. The post office is now closed, but a mobile service operates in the village.

St Hilary's Church (Eglwys Sant Ilar) has a large square tower, chancel, nave, and porch. In the porch is a hollowed stone for holding holy water and, above the door, there is an ancient beam with carved heads and animals inscribed with the words J.S. W.W.A. Church Wardens, 1683. Under the name "Church of St Ilar", it is a grade II* listed building. There is a Roman site just to the east.

Llanilar railway station on the line from Carmarthen to Aberystwyth opened in 1867 as part of the Manchester and Milford Railway, but closed in 1964 when severe flooding damaged a bridge in the area. The Ystwyth Trail, a scenic cycle route, links Aberystwyth and Tregaron and passes the village along the line of the old railway.

Llanilar Football Club play at Castle Hill Park in the village.

== Notable people ==
- Saint Ilar (6th C. AD), a putative Breton missionary and martyr
- John Jones (1700–1770), clergyman and controversialist
- Evan Lewis (1818–1901), clergyman, Dean of Bangor Cathedral from 1884
- Dai Jones MBE (1943–2022), a Welsh broadcaster who lived and farmed in Llanilar
