= Aberystwyth railway station =

Railway station in Ceredigion, Wales

Aberystwyth
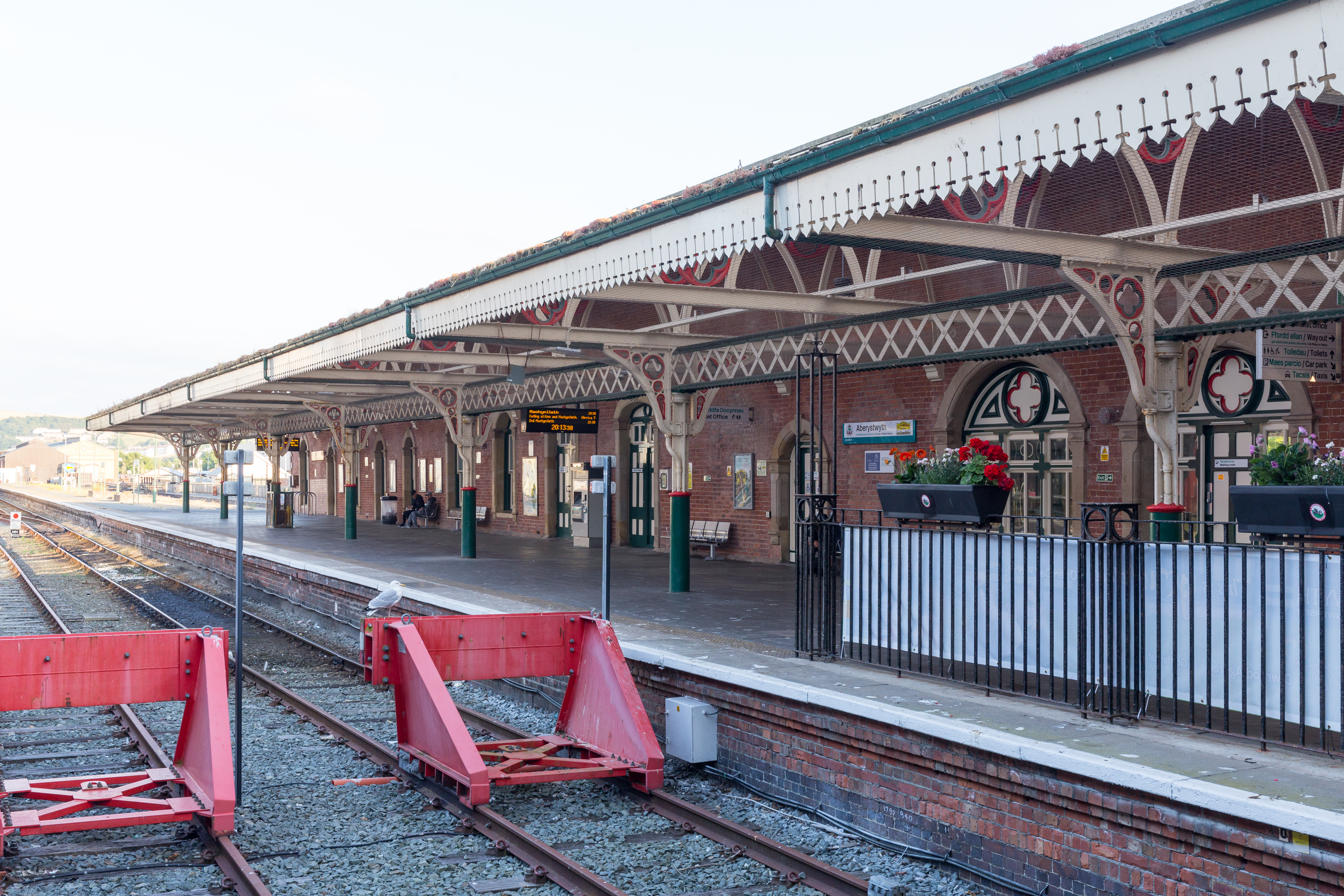
- Terminus at Aberystwyth station

General information
- Location: Alexandra Road, Aberystwyth; Ceredigion; Wales
- Coordinates: 52.4139°N 4.0816°W
- Grid reference: SN585815
- Manager: Transport for Wales
- Platforms: 2; 1 (standard gauge); 1 (narrow gauge)

Other information
- Station code: AYW
- Classification: DfT category D

History
- Original company: Aberystwith and Welsh Coast Railway
- Pre-grouping: Cambrian Railways / Great Western Railway
- Post-grouping: Great Western Railway

Key dates
- 23 June 1864: Aberystwith and Welsh Coast Railway station opens
- 19 July 1867: Manchester and Milford Railway station opens; later amalgamates with A&WC station
- 22 December 1902: Vale of Rheidol Aberystwyth Smithfield station opens
- 31 July 1925: Great Western Railway (Vale of Rheidol) station opens adjacent to standard gauge station replacing Aberystwyth Smithfield
- 31 August 1939: Great Western (Vale of Rheidol) station closes (World War II)
- 23 July 1945: Great Western (Vale of Rheidol) station reopens
- 1964: Carmarthen Line services cease
- 17 April 1968: Vale of Rheidol Railway services start from combined station using the Carmarthen Line platforms - Great Western (Vale of Rheidol) station closes

Passengers
- 2021/22: ▲0.171 million
- 2022/23: ▲0.242 million
- 2023/24: ▲0.276 million
- 2024/25: ▲0.299 million
- 2025/26: ▲0.330 million

Listed Building – Grade II
- Designated: 12 July 1981 (amended 24 November 1987)
- Reference no.: 9930
Location
Notes
- Passenger statistics from the Office of Rail and Road

Aberystwyth railway station is located in the town of Aberystwyth, Ceredigion, Wales; it is served by passenger trains operated by Transport for Wales. It is the terminus of both the Cambrian Line (sited 81 1/2 miles (131.2 km) west of Shrewsbury) and of the narrow-gauge Vale of Rheidol Railway.

== History ==
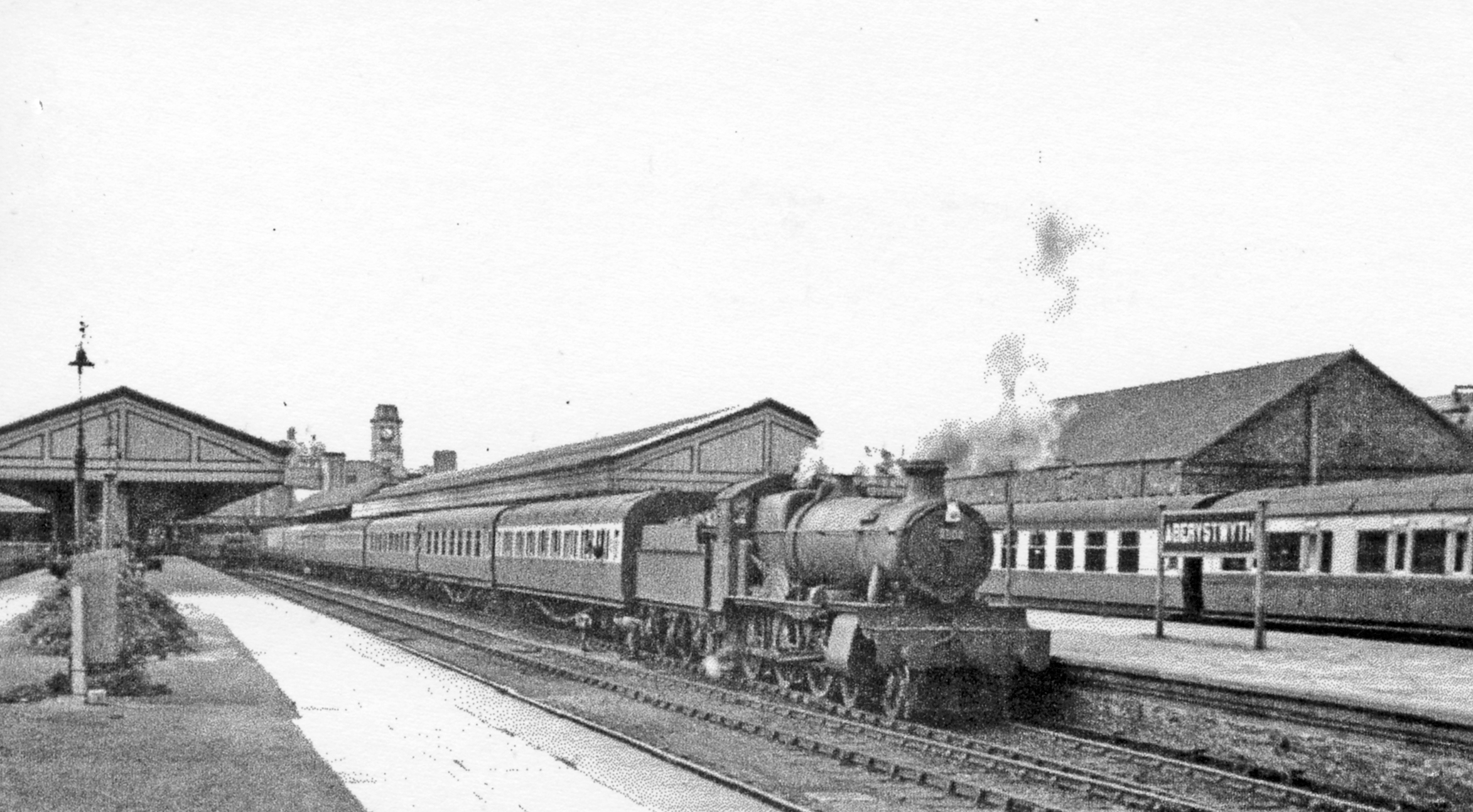
The station in 1952

The original station was built in 1864 by the Aberystwith and Welsh Coast Railway for the route to Machynlleth. The neighbouring Manchester and Milford Railway was to construct a two road platform adjoining this, to create a joint station and provide access south to Carmarthen. The station was greatly extended in 1925 by the Great Western Railway; the original station building on one side of the platforms was replaced by a grand terminus building.

At that time, the station had five platforms: platform 1 at the south-east end of the station and two island platforms. Platforms 1 and 2 were essentially bays, each of the same length and shorter than the other three. They were the original Manchester and Milford Railway platforms, used for the Carmarthen services, although platform 2 was occasionally used for main-line trains. The Carmarthen line was closed in 1964 following flood damage. The former platform 3 is on the other side of platform 2; it is the only platform still in use for main-line rail and has been redesignated as platform 1 in recent years. The former platform 4, which was closed in 1982 with its track removed, is now taken up by the Craft freecycling shop. At that time, the signal box was also closed and demolished. Access to the station and the station facilities is now primarily via the original 1864 building.

Due to severe flood damage, services between Machynlleth and Aberystwyth were suspended between 2 January and 14 April 1976. The flooding caused the track to move vertically (rather than buckle, caused by extreme heat) and parts of the embankment were washed away.

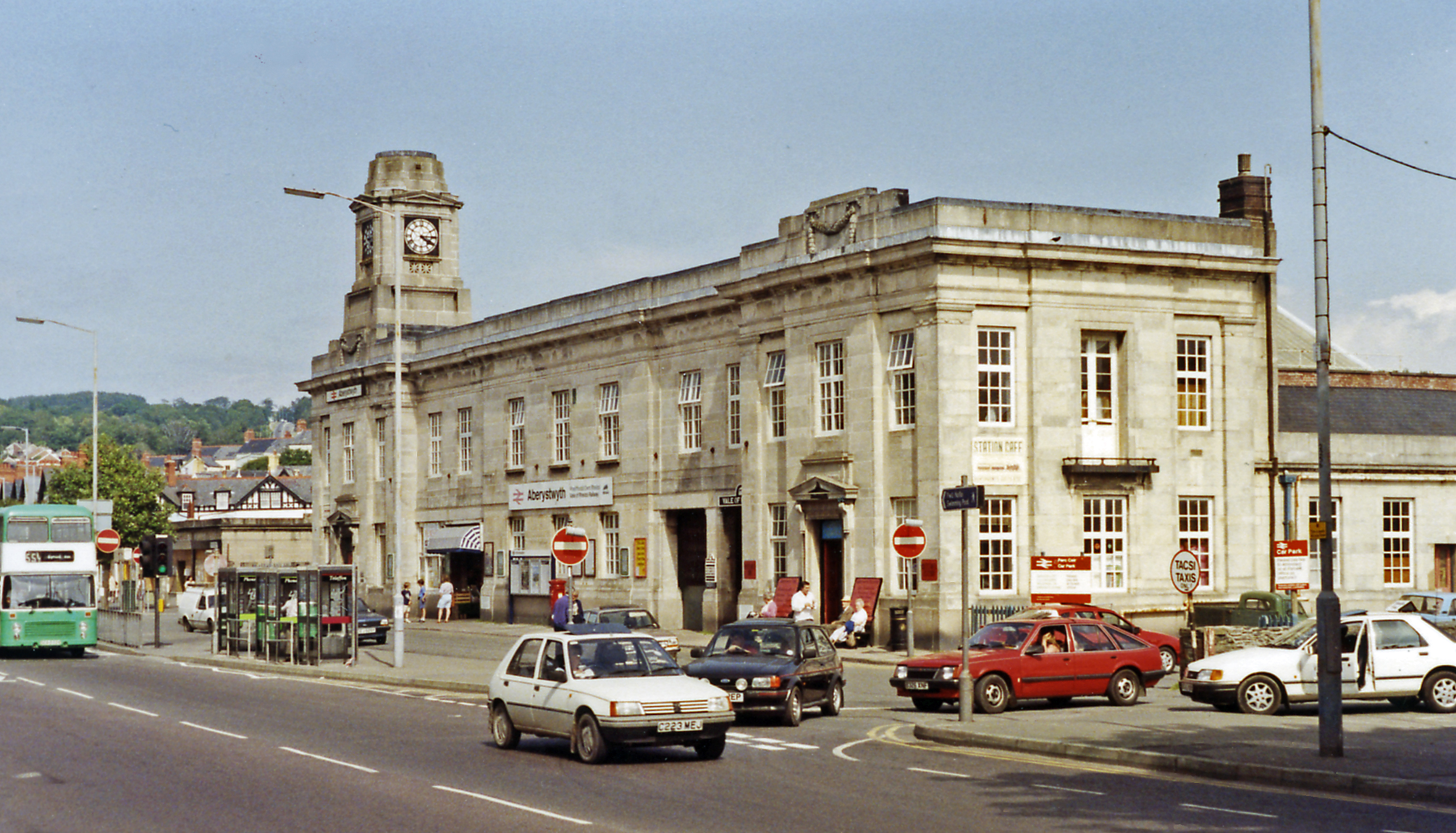
The imposing GWR exterior seen in 1992

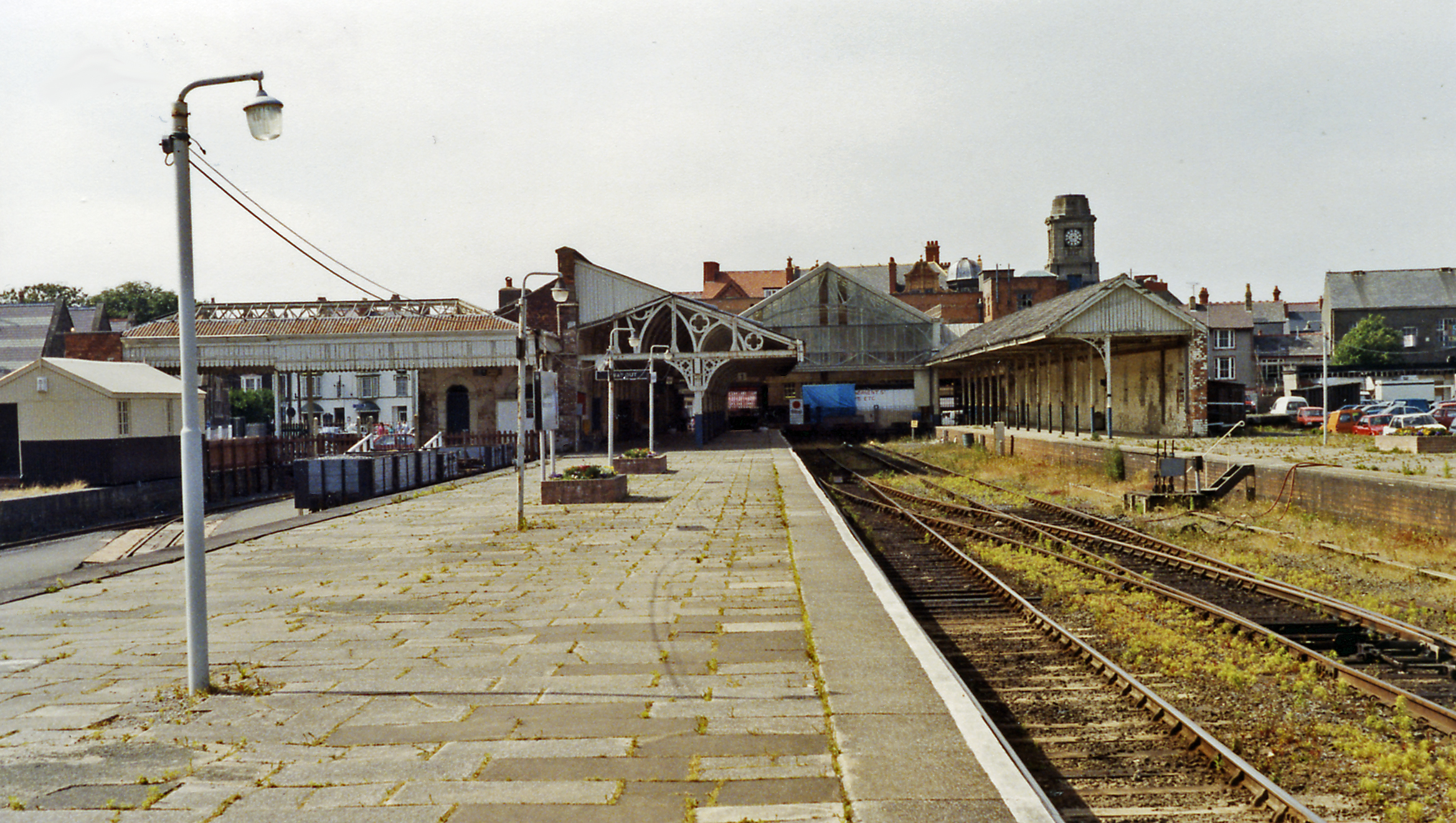
Platform view in 1992

With the decline of railway usage and of local tourism, the facilities were far too large for their purpose. The railway yard was lifted in the 1980s and the row of shops in front, known as Western Parade, was demolished in the 1990s to allow construction of a new retail park and bus station. The 1925 station building has seen several uses, including as a local museum, but was eventually sold off and converted into a Wetherspoons pub. This conversion maintained the architecture and won awards including a National Railway Heritage Award in 2003. Other parts of the building have become office space and accommodation for a local furniture recycling scheme; part of the station building was purchased by Aberystwyth University in 2022 and remodelled into a studying space for the university's staff and students.

There were proposals for reinstating a direct train to London which stopped running in 1991. The journey would have taken four hours, but the plan was rejected in 2010.

== Vale of Rheidol Railway ==
The platform that was originally used by trains via Lampeter to Carmarthen is now used by the narrow gauge steam-operated Vale of Rheidol Railway. This railway's track runs parallel to and immediately to the south of the main line as far as Llanbadarn Fawr. Opened in 1902, it originally had its own terminus at Aberystwyth Smithfield (named after Smithfield Road, now Park Avenue). This closed in 1925 and was replaced by a station a short distance from the main railway station; that station site is now a supermarket car park.

In 1968, its track was rerouted into the former standard gauge bay platforms 1 and 2 of the main station. As their trains unload at ground level, a new ramp and ground-level island platform were built in the space between the two original platforms. There is a runaround loop and access to the former mainline railway shed. This was used as the storage and works area for the Vale of Rheidol Railway.

From 2014, the Vale of Rheidol railway, with the help of an EU-funded grant, converted the old platform 1 of the Carmarthen branch to a reduced height. This now allows passengers to board coaches from the level of the running board, as opposed to from ground level. The access is invaluable to passengers who have mobility issues. This does not allow wheelchairs to be wheeled onto coaches, but the company is working on a solution by adapting some existing rolling stock to this purpose.

In 2011, a purpose-built railway works was built on the site of the old GWR coaling stage. This now allows the railway to carry out heavy maintenance and restorations on its stock. It also allows contract work to be undertaken. The works has an apprentice school.

== Layout ==
As of December 2020, the station has a single main-line platform for trains to Machynlleth and beyond, with a loop that is used to reverse locomotive-hauled specials, including steam services and maintenance trains.

The Vale of Rheidol Railway launched the "Wales to the World" development and began construction of a railway museum on the station site in 2018, using structures relocated from London Bridge station during modernisation. The museum opened to the public on 23 March 2024 in the restored 1930s engine shed and includes displays of historic locomotives and rolling stock. The new museum features exhibits such as "Fire Queen" (built 1848) and "Dukedog No. 9017", on loan from the Bluebell Railway. As part of the same project, a three-road carriage storage shed was completed to provide covered accommodation for the railway's rolling stock.

== Facilities ==
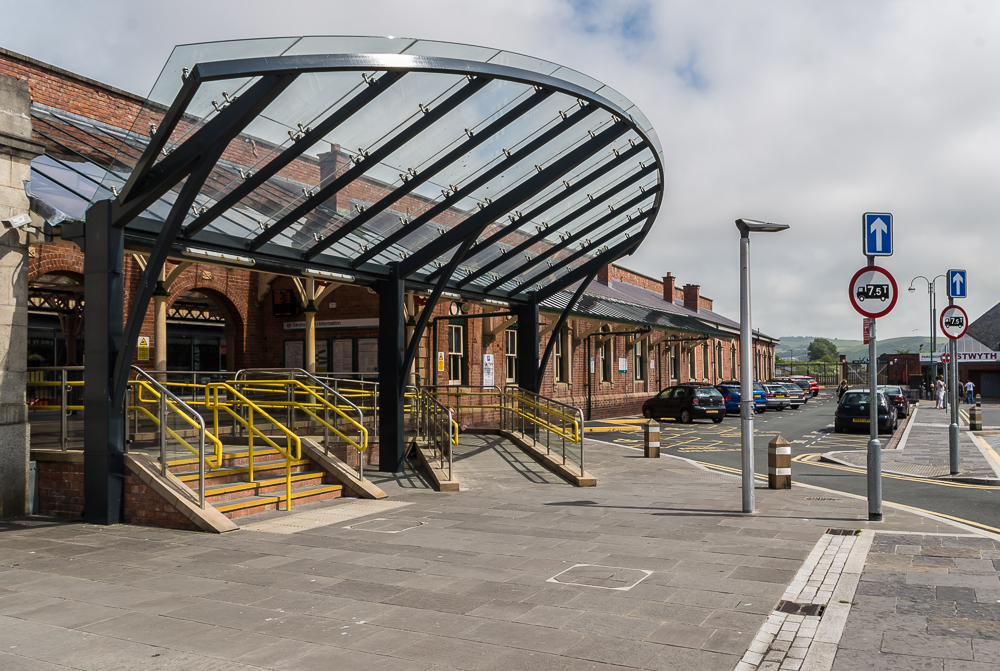
A new canopy over the upgraded side entrance, July 2016

The station has a staffed ticket office, open six days per week. A self-service ticket machine is also provided for use outside these times and for collecting pre-paid tickets. Other amenities include toilets, waiting room and a customer help point. Train running information is also offered via digital information screens, automatic announcements and timetable posters. There is no ATM. Step-free access is available between the entrance, concourse and platform. Many of these improvements came from the Welsh Government with funding from European Regional Development Fund and the UK Government's National Station Improvement Project.

== Services ==
Transport for Wales operates all services along the Cambrian Line.

Mondays to Saturdays:

- 16 trains per day to Machynlleth
  - 12 of which continue to Shrewsbury
    - 8 of which continue to Birmingham New Street
      - 7 of which continue to Birmingham International

Sundays:

- 12 trains per day to Machynlleth
  - 8 of which continue to Shrewsbury
    - 6 of which continue to Birmingham International

Preceding station	National Rail	Following station
Terminus	Transport for Wales Birmingham International-Aberystwyth	Bow Street
Historical railways
Terminus	Cambrian Railways; Aberystwith and Welsh Coast Railway	Bow Street; Line and station open
Disused railways
Terminus	Great Western Railway; Manchester and Milford Railway	Llanrhystyd Road; Line and station closed
Preceding station	Heritage railways	Following station
Terminus	Vale of Rheidol Railway	Llanbadarn towards Devil's Bridge

== Motive power depot ==
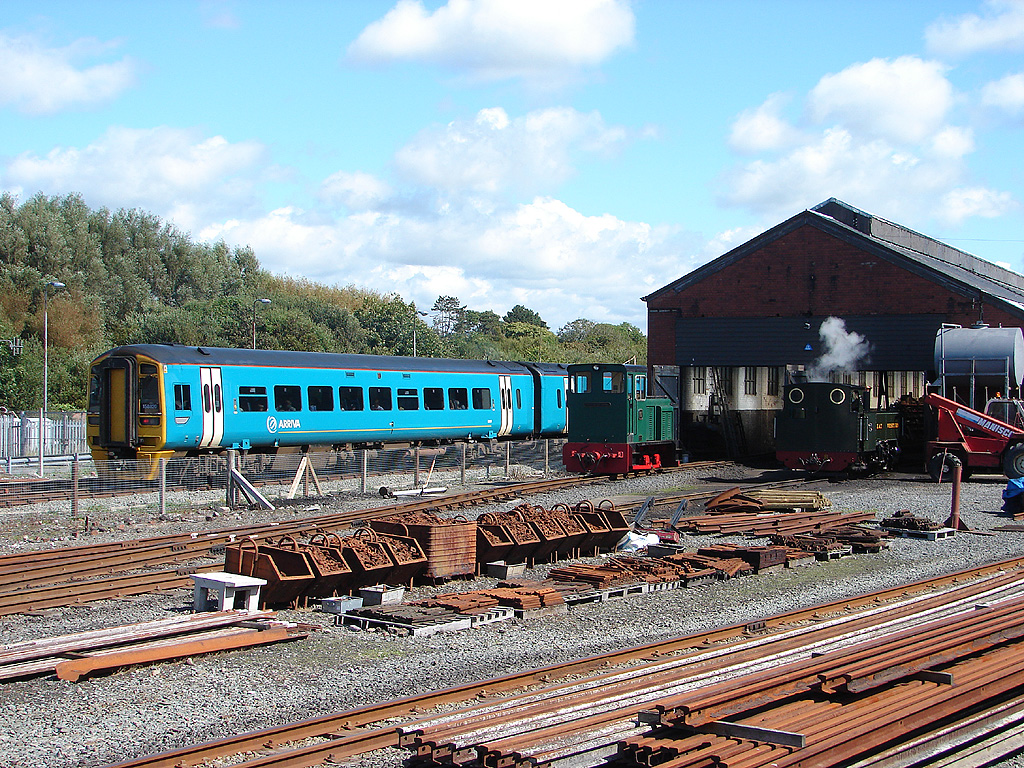
The former GWR locomotive depot

A small engine shed was opened close to the station in 1864 and extended in 1867. This was demolished by the Great Western Railway in 1938 to make way for a larger brick built structure, which is still standing. The shed was not allocated a code by British Railways since it was deemed a sub-shed of Machynlleth, and so locomotives bore that depot's code, 89C.

Aberystwyth Motive Power Depot was notable as being the last steam locomotive depot on the British Rail network. Initially closed under the Beeching report, along with the line to Carmarthen, it was adapted for use by the Vale of Rheidol railway when it relocated to the former Carmarthen platforms. The facility replaced a dilapidated set of small sheds at the railway's original base, at the riverside by the football ground. The area is now used as a car park. The shed area creates a small spur in what is otherwise a linear layout. The Vale of Rheidol was steam operated by British Rail until privatisation in 1989. Accordingly, it was an often requested posting for staff. The line is still steam operated but is owned by a charitable trust.

A new steel framed locomotive works was completed in late 2011. The building includes a machine shop, restoration workshop and locomotive running shed. The existing former Great Western Railway shed is currently used to house the running fleet.
