= Pencader, Carmarthenshire =

Village in Carmarthenshire, Wales

Coordinates: 52.001°N 4.266°W

Pencader
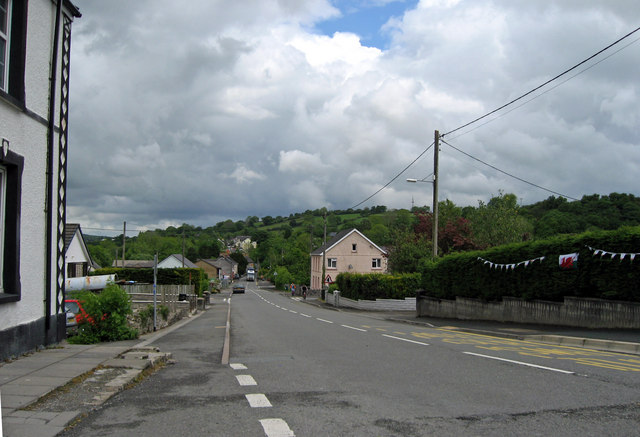

- Location within Carmarthenshire
- Population: 1,060 (built-up area; 2021 census)
- OS grid reference: SN445359
- Community: Llanfihangel-ar-Arth
- Principal area: Carmarthenshire
- Preserved county: Dyfed
- Country: Wales
- Sovereign state: United Kingdom
- Post town: PENCADER
- Postcode district: SA39
- Dialling code: 01559
- Police: Dyfed-Powys
- Fire: Mid and West Wales
- Ambulance: Welsh
- UK Parliament: Caerfyrddin
- Senedd Cymru – Welsh Parliament: Carmarthen East and Dinefwr
- Website: http://www.pencader.org.uk/

Pencader (Welsh pronunciation) is a small village in Carmarthenshire, Wales, in the community of Llanfihangel-ar-Arth. It is located around 3 miles (5 km) south-east of Llandysul and 6.5 miles (10 km) south-west of Llanybydder, in the valley of the Gwen brook, shortly before the confluence with the River Talog, to form the River Tyweli (a tributary of the Teifi).

It is a village of little more than 500 houses, two shops, two pubs and an Anglican church (St Mary's). For many years, it was one of the main stops on the Carmarthen–Aberystwyth line, and was the junction for the service to Newcastle Emlyn; the Pencader Tunnel enabled services to reach Carmarthen via Llanpumsaint. The decline of the railways saw the Newcastle Emlyn branch line closed in 1952 and the main line closed to passengers in 1965.

== History ==
A battle was fought here between Gruffydd ap Llywelyn and Hywel ab Edwin in 1041; Gruffydd was the victor, and went on to become the first and last King of Wales.

Pencader is the site of an old castle, which was probably erected by Gilbert de Clare, 1st Earl of Pembroke in 1145.

== Railway ==
The broad gauge Carmarthen and Cardigan Railway connected Pencader to both the West Wales Line of the Great Western Railway, and north to Newcastle Emlyn.

From 1845, a scheme was proposed to connect the industrialised Northwest England and Manchester to the deep water port at Milford Haven, to provide an alternative to the congested Port of Liverpool. Given Parliamentary approval in 1865 as a standard gauge railway, the Manchester and Milford Railway junctioned with the C&CR at Pencader, and then drove north to Strata Florida, and to the coast at Aberystwyth. Having constructed and made operational the easy section from Pencader to Aberystwyth, the M&MR ran out of money trying to build the connection from Llanidloes to Strata Florida, leaving the 1.5 miles (2.4 km) stub of the Llangurig branch from the Mid-Wales Railway. The M&MR was absorbed into the GWR in 1911.

Under the Beeching Axe of British Railways, in 1965 passenger services to Pencader ceased, with freight and goods ceasing in 1973. The station was demolished, and the site is now a lorry haulage depot.

== Sport ==
Pencader has a football club named Pencader United. They were founded in 1982 and play in the Ceredigion League.

== Notable people ==
- John Evans (1779 at Cwmgwen – 1847), a Welsh Methodist.
- Sarah Jacob (1857–1869), one of the so-called fasting girls
- Aled Hall (born 1968), Opera singer

== Image gallery ==
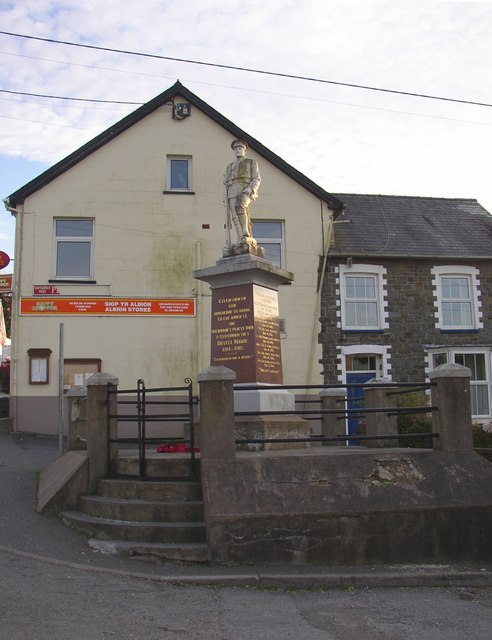
War memorial in Pencader

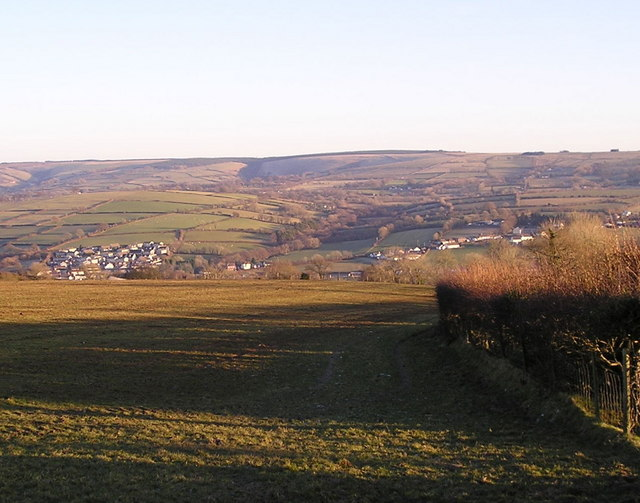
View towards Pencader

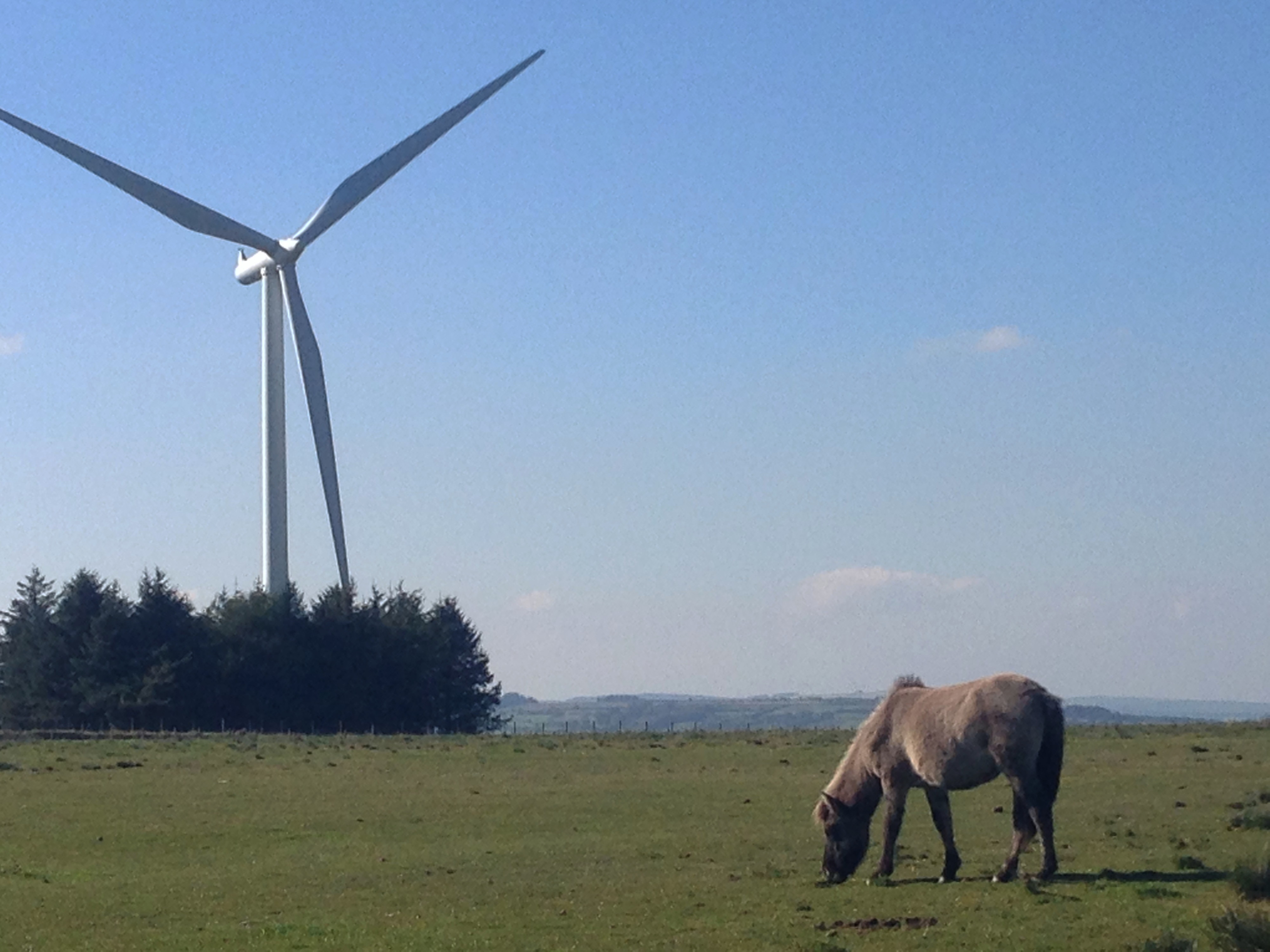
Horse grazing near the Pencader wind turbine
