= Bow Street, Ceredigion =

Village in Ceredigion, Wales

Coordinates: 52.441944°N 4.028611°W

Bow Street
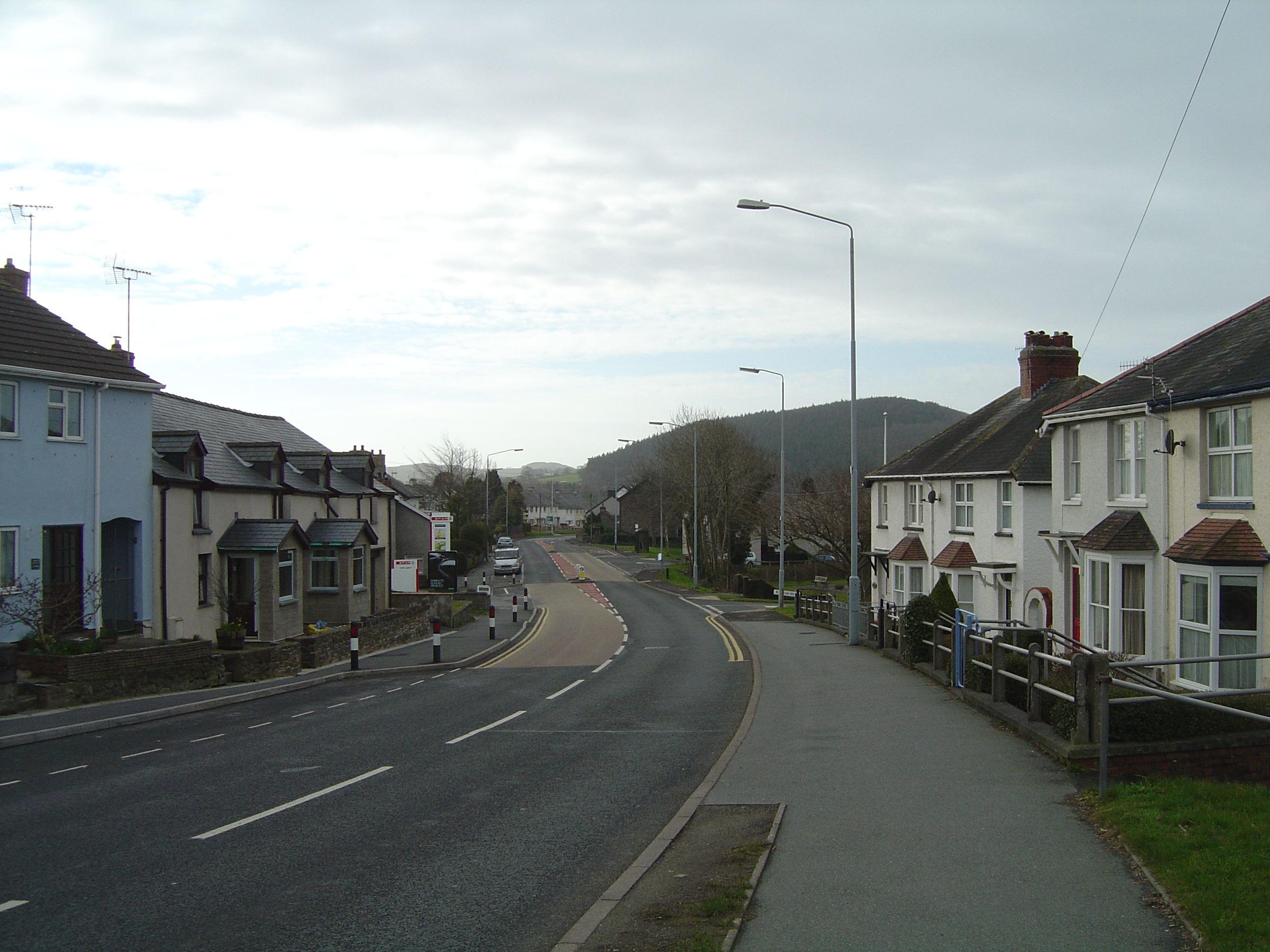
- Bow Street, looking south towards Aberystwyth with the houses of Nantyfallen on the left

- Location within Ceredigion
- Population: 1,901
- Language: British English; Welsh (68.8% of population)
- OS grid reference: SN6284
- Principal area: Ceredigion
- Preserved county: Dyfed
- Country: Wales
- Sovereign state: United Kingdom
- Post town: BOW STREET
- Postcode district: SY24
- Dialling code: 01970
- Police: Dyfed-Powys
- Fire: Mid and West Wales
- Ambulance: Welsh
- UK Parliament: Ceredigion Preseli
- Senedd Cymru – Welsh Parliament: Ceredigion Penfro

Bow Street is a large village in the Tirymynach district of Ceredigion, Wales, approximately 3.5 miles (5.6 km) north-east of Aberystwyth. As well as Bow Street itself, it is now often considered to include the neighbouring smaller village of Pen-y-garn and the hamlet of Rhydypennau. All three places stretch in a long narrow strip along the main Aberystwyth to Machynlleth road, the A487.

Bow Street is also a post town, and as well as covering the villages of Bow Street and Pen-y-garn and the hamlet of Rhydypennau, it also includes the nearby village of Llandre and the hamlets of Taigwynion and Dole, together with the surrounding farms.

The population of the Community, Tirymynach in 2011 was 1,901.

== History ==
=== Toponymy ===
The earliest attestation of the name 'Bow Street' yet found is in the parish registers of Llanbadarn Fawr, where there is a baptism entry dated 9 February 1777 for a "Wm son of Jenkin & Ann Thomas, Bow Street".

It would appear that the name is derived from the London street of the same name, and that its application to the small cluster of houses that would become Bow Street was connected with the turnpiking of the main Aberystwyth to Machynlleth turnpike road from 1770 onwards. It may be that the choice of name was influenced by the fact that the road does actually bend slightly at this point, and might therefore have been analogous to the ‘bow’ of the London Bow Street. There are two small lanes in the village which are also known locally by English names, these being Cock and Hen Street and Thread Needle Street (sometimes Thread and Needle Street). Supposed traditions associating the name Bow Street with a local magistrate do not appear to stand up to scrutiny, and probably developed later as a way of justifying the existence of an English place name in a predominantly Welsh-speaking area.

In his seminal work on Cardiganshire placenames, Iwan Wmffre suggests that an earlier name for Bow Street may have been Rhyd-y-castell (ford of the castle). But the ford of Rhyd-y-castell was actually located on the small lane called Cock and Hen Street, that runs alongside the Welsh Black (formerly the Black Lion) and leads towards Clarach and Llangorwen, and not on the main Aberystwyth to Machynlleth road where the first houses in Bow Street were built. Though there is no officially sanctioned Welsh equivalent to Bow Street, the author and novelist Tom Macdonald, who spent part of his childhood here, recounted that "old folk told me it was once called Nant-y-Fallen". The small stream still called Nant Afallen runs under the main road a little to the north of where the original hamlet of Bow Street first grew up, and was applied to the row of small cottages that once stood nearby. The name Nantyfallen was also later extended to refer to those cottages running up the slope from the brook towards Cross Street. Occasionally in Welsh writing the name Bow Street is spelt as Bwstryd.

== Transport ==
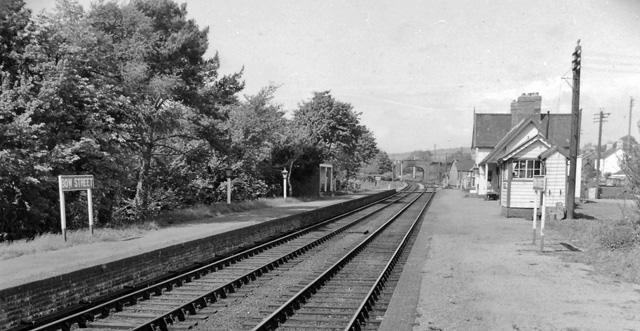
Bow Street station in 1962

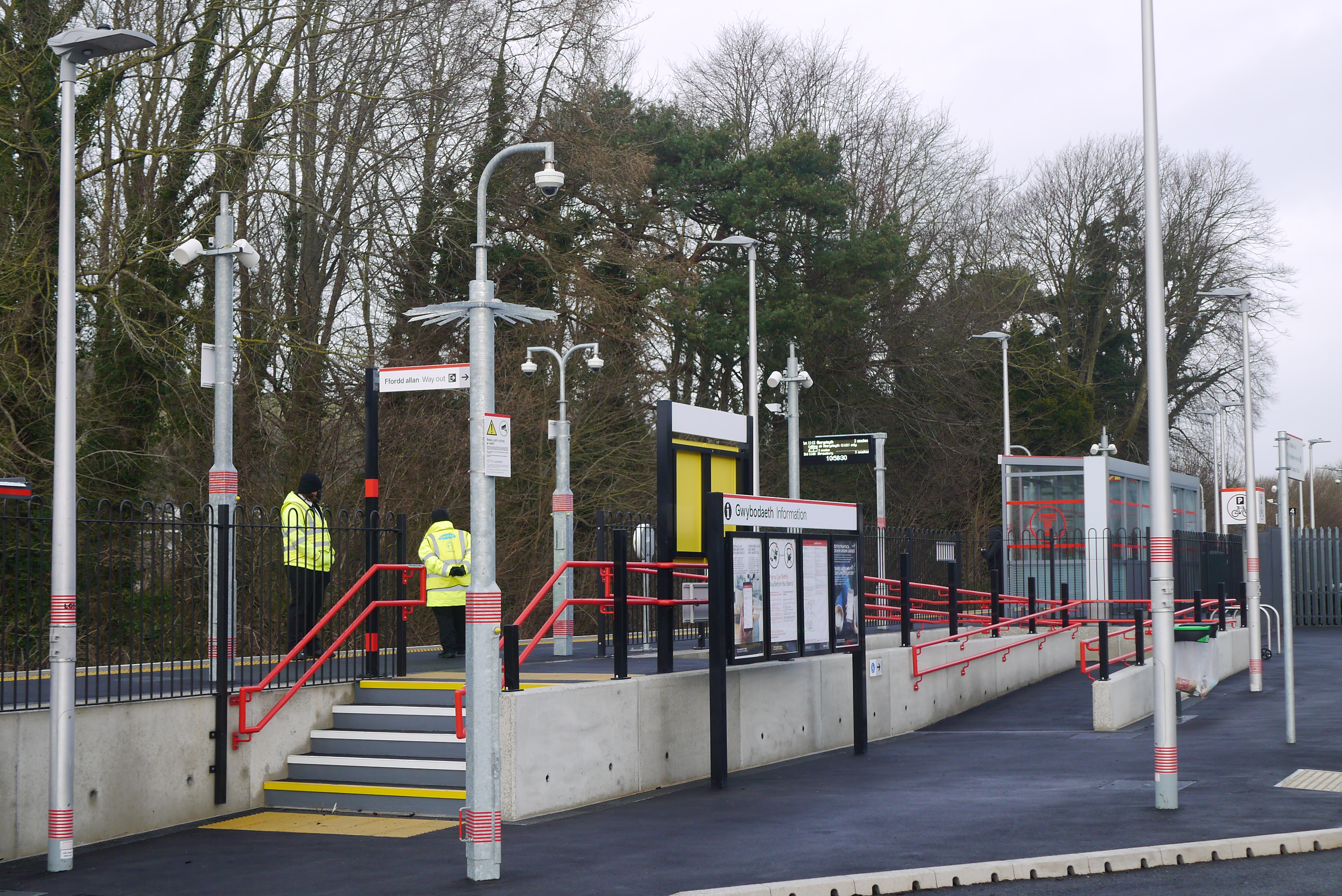
New Bow Street station on opening day in 2021

Bow Street railway station on the Cambrian Line reopened in February 2021 following its closure in 1965 under the Beeching axe. Plans for the station to be reinstated were first published in July 2016 and approved in August 2017, and work had started by January 2020 with the new station initially planned to be opened later that year, but it actually opened on 14 February 2021.

A road leads down to Llandre and Borth on the coast. To the south is Comins Coch and to the east, Plas Gogerddan.

== Climate ==
Climate data for Gogerddan (1991–2020 averages)
Month	Jan	Feb	Mar	Apr	May	Jun	Jul	Aug	Sep	Oct	Nov	Dec	Year
Mean daily maximum °C (°F)	8.4 (47.1)	8.6 (47.5)	10.4 (50.7)	12.9 (55.2)	15.7 (60.3)	18.0 (64.4)	19.5 (67.1)	19.3 (66.7)	17.6 (63.7)	14.5 (58.1)	11.3 (52.3)	9.0 (48.2)	13.8 (56.8)
Mean daily minimum °C (°F)	2.7 (36.9)	2.6 (36.7)	3.6 (38.5)	5.0 (41.0)	7.6 (45.7)	10.4 (50.7)	12.5 (54.5)	12.4 (54.3)	10.3 (50.5)	8.1 (46.6)	5.1 (41.2)	3.0 (37.4)	7.0 (44.6)
Average precipitation mm (inches)	102.9 (4.05)	81.7 (3.22)	74.1 (2.92)	63.0 (2.48)	62.5 (2.46)	81.0 (3.19)	85.6 (3.37)	85.8 (3.38)	96.6 (3.80)	122.9 (4.84)	123.5 (4.86)	126.9 (5.00)	1,106.5 (43.56)
Average precipitation days	15.9	13.0	12.5	11.4	10.4	11.1	12.6	12.7	13.0	15.5	17.6	17.0	162.7
Mean monthly sunshine hours	51.1	71.5	112.2	170.4	208.5	187.9	184.3	164.4	133.2	97.0	55.4	43.8	1,479.7

== Tornado ==
In the early hours of 28 November 2006, the village was struck by a tornado, that was rated T3 on the TORRO Scale. This caused structural damage to more than 20 houses, as well as uprooting trees, and damaging power-lines, caravans and a railway bridge. No injuries were reported. Some papers caught up in the tornado were found a week later, 20 miles (32 km) away in the village of Corris.

== Notable residents ==
- Tom Macdonald (1900–1980), journalist and novelist
- J. T. Rees (1857–1949), musician and composer
- Gwyneth Keyworth (1990-), actress.

== Bibliography ==
- Macdonald, Tom (1975). The White Lanes of Summer. Macmillan, London. ISBN 0-333-17975-7
