= Bow Street railway station =

Railway station in Ceredigion, Wales

Bow Street
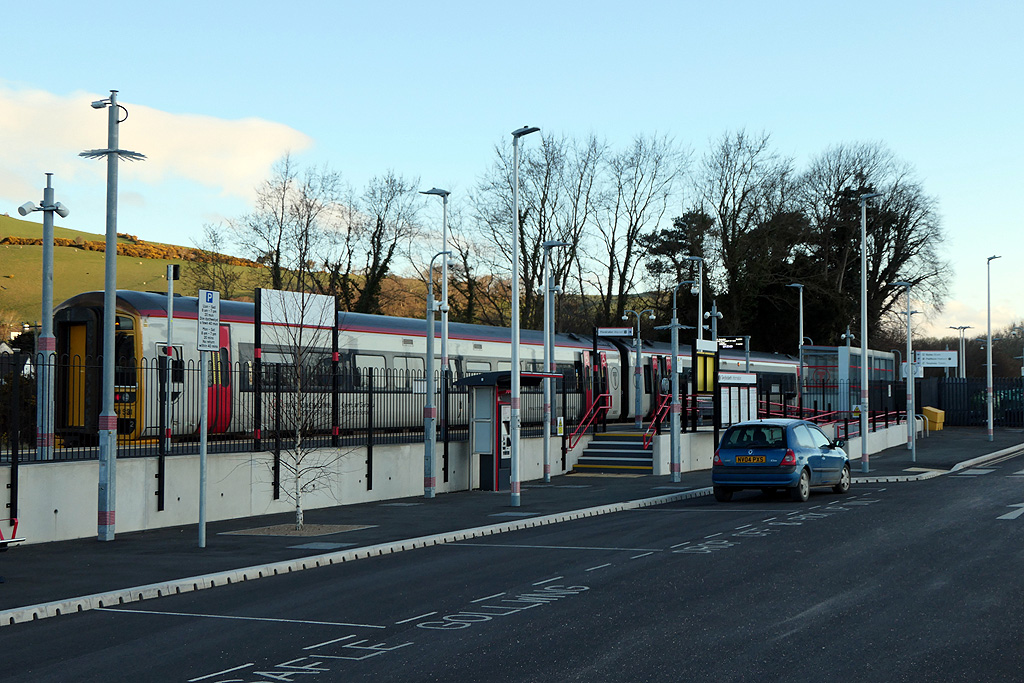

General information
- Location: Bow Street, Ceredigion; Wales
- Coordinates: 52°26′24″N 4°01′49″W
- Grid reference: SN620843
- Owner: Network Rail
- Manager: Transport for Wales
- Platforms: 1
- Tracks: 1

Other information
- Station code: BOW

History
- Original company: Aberystwith and Welsh Coast Railway
- Pre-grouping: Cambrian Railways
- Post-grouping: Great Western Railway; British Rail (Western Region)

Key dates
- 23 June 1864: Opened
- 14 June 1965: Closed
- 14 February 2021: Resited and reopened

Passengers
- 2021/22: ▲13,694
- 2022/23: ▲23,282
- 2023/24: ▲28,582
- 2024/25: ▲34,538
- 2025/26: ▲42,240
Location
- Location within Ceredigion
Notes
- Passenger statistics from the Office of Rail and Road

Bow Street is a railway station on the Cambrian Line, which runs between Shrewsbury and Aberystwyth or Pwllheli. The station, situated 4 miles 30 chains (7 km) north-east of Aberystwyth, serves the villages of Bow Street and Pen-y-garn in Ceredigion, Wales. It is owned by Network Rail and managed by Transport for Wales.

The original station was closed on 14 June 1965. The current station was constructed on a different site, just south of the original. Funded by the Welsh Government and the Department for Transport, it opened on 14 February 2021.

== History ==
=== Original station ===
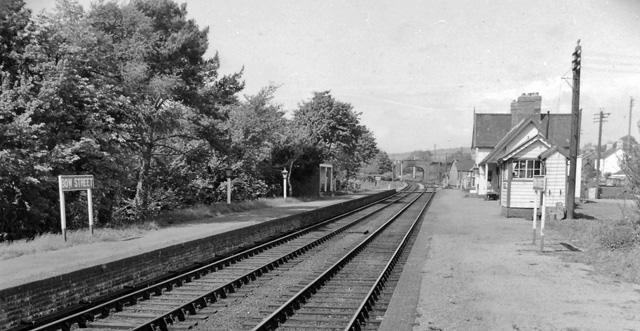
The original station, as photographed in June 1962.

The station was opened on 14 June 1864 by the Aberystwith and Welsh Coast Railway, following the opening of the section of line between Borth and Aberystwyth.

Between 1934 and 1939, the station was host to a Great Western Railway camping coach. A camping coach was also positioned here by the Western Region between 1952 and 1957, with two coaches situated here in both 1958 and 1959.

The station was closed on 14 June 1965, as part of the Beeching Axe.

=== Reopening ===
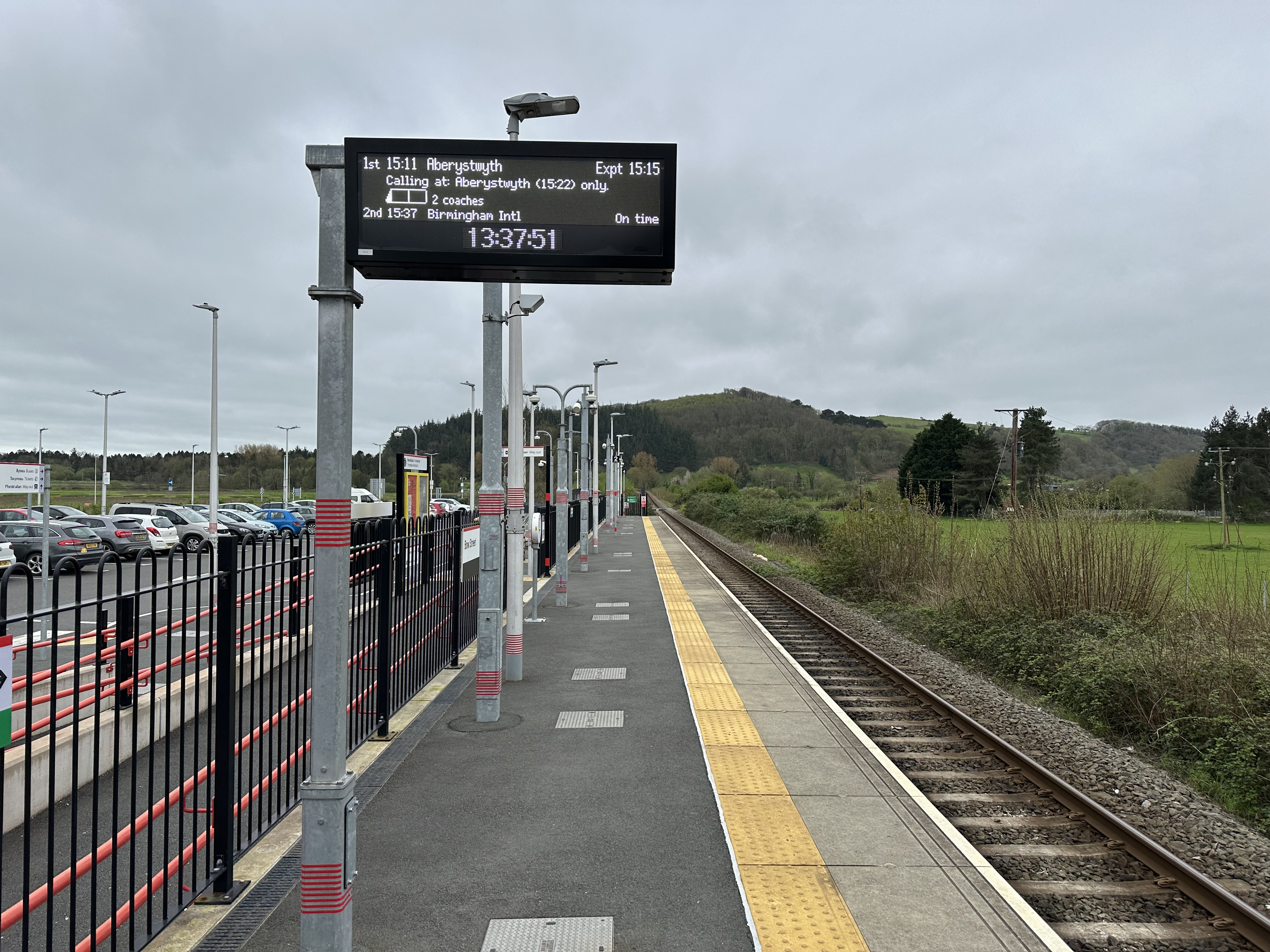
Station platform in April 2024

The Welsh Government commissioned a study into the reopening of the station in 2015. In December 2016 the Welsh Government made an application to the UK Government for £4 million towards the reopening of the station at a site south of the original station, which was then occupied by a builders' merchants. The new plans included facilities for a 110 capacity car park, bicycle storage and a bus and coach interchange.

In July 2017, it was announced that the station had been approved funding from the Department for Transport. Work was expected to start on the new station in early November 2018 and finishing by March 2020 – at a cost of £7.95 million. However, in August 2019 it was revealed that Transport for Wales was having to put in another plan for the car parking facilities to Ceredigion County Council, after Natural Resources Wales raised concerns about potential flooding risks.

Planning permission for the new station was granted in September 2019, with work having commenced by January 2020. Work was expected to be completed by summer 2020, but further delays were caused by the COVID-19 pandemic, as well as drainage issues. Groundwork on the station was completed by December 2020, and the station was reopened on 14 February 2021.

== Services ==
As of the December 2021 timetable change, the station is served by a two-hourly service between Aberystwyth and Machynlleth, with some trains extending to Shrewsbury or Birmingham International.

Preceding station	National Rail	Following station
Aberystwyth	Transport for Wales Rail Cambrian Line	Borth
	Historical railways	
Aberystwyth; Line and station open	Cambrian Railways; Aberystwith and Welsh Coast Railway	Llandre; Line open, station closed
