= Dewi Morgan =

Welsh poet

Y Prifardd Dewi Morgan
- Born: David Morgan; 1877 'Bryndderwen', Dôl-y-Bont, Cardiganshire, Wales
- Died: 1 April 1971 (aged 93–94) 'Carreg Afon', Dole, Cardiganshire, Wales
- Other name: "Dewi Teifi"
- Education: Rhydypennau Board School
- Occupations: Journalist and poet
- Notable work: 'Cantre'r Gwaelod'
- Style: Cynghanedd
- Spouses: (1) Minnie Davies; (2) Olwen Eluned Jones (1899–1947); (3) Sarah Margaretta Morgan (1877–1957)
- Children: William Gwynn Morgan (1913–1956); Dafydd Elystan Morgan (1932–2020); Deulwyn Morgan (1936–2000)
- Parent(s): William Morgan (1842–1917) and Jane James (1846–1922)
- Awards: National Eisteddfod Chair (1925)

Dewi Morgan (1877 – 1 April 1971), also known by his bardic name "Dewi Teifi", was a Welsh bard, scholar and journalist, who won the Chair at the 1925 National Eisteddfod of Wales in Pwllheli with his important awdl recounting the legend of Cantre'r Gwaelod.

== Biography ==
Born David Morgan at 'Bryndderwen', Dôl-y-Bont in Cardiganshire, Wales, opposite Capel y Babell, he was the son of William Morgan (1842–1917) and Jane James (1846–1922). He later claimed that his ancestry stretched back to Sir Gruffudd Fychan of Denbigh, who had been knighted in the field at the Battle of Agincourt by Henry V in 1426. Dewi Morgan moved with his family to Pen-y-garn when he was two years old, after his father built and opened a grocer’s shop there called Garn House. The sign above the door of the shop read “William Morgan, General Merchant”, and as well a being a grocer, Dewi’s father sold coal and carried goods.

Dewi Morgan was largely self-taught, having had little formal education, becoming a master of the form of strict-meter Welsh poetry known as Cynghanedd. He regularly competed at regional and local eisteddfodau, winning his first eisteddfod Chair at the age of twenty-two. Following his success at Pwllheli, he said that one of the two greatest influences on his life was the headmaster of Rhydypennau School, John Evans; the other was his great friend T. Gwynn Jones. Through his friendship with the latter Morgan not only deepened his understanding and appreciation of Welsh literature, but also broadened his knowledge to encompass the wider European literary tradition. Amongst his other friends could be counted many Welsh scholars and academics, including T. H. Parry-Williams, T. E. Nicholas and Eifion Wyn.

He encouraged many young poets and writers, particularly the young Tom Macdonald who lived across the road from Dewi in Pen-y-garn. Tom Macdonald, who knew him as “Dewi Garnhouse”, makes reference to Dewi's influence upon him in his writings. For many years Dewi Morgan was sub-editor for the Welsh language newspaper Baner ac Amserau Cymru, under Prosser Rhys, as well as being on the staff of Y Tyst and the Welsh editor at the Cambrian News.

== Family ==
Dewi Morgan was married three times, first to Minnie Davies on 22 September 1909; then to Olwen Eluned Jones on 9 September 1931 (who died on 2 November 1947 aged only 47 years); and finally to Sarah Margaretta Morgan in 1950 (1877–1957). His second son is Lord Elystan Morgan. His grandchild is author Lleucu Roberts.

== Bibliography ==
- Jones, Nerys Ann (1987). Dewi Morgan: Cofiant. Y Lolfa, Talybont. ISBN 0-86243-131-X
