= Glandyfi =

Village in Ceredigion, Wales

Coordinates: 52.5605°N 3.92422°W

- Location within Ceredigion
- OS grid reference: SN695969
- Principal area: Ceredigion
- Preserved county: Ceredigion
- Country: Wales
- Sovereign state: United Kingdom
- Post town: MACHYNLLETH
- Postcode district: SY20
- Dialling code: 01654
- Police: Dyfed-Powys
- Fire: Mid and West Wales
- Ambulance: Welsh
- UK Parliament: Ceredigion Preseli
- Senedd Cymru – Welsh Parliament: Ceredigion Penfro

Glandyfi (formerly anglicised as Glandovey) is a small hamlet in the county of Ceredigion in Wales on the A487 trunk road from Machynlleth to Aberystwyth.

Glandyfi Castle was built in the Regency Gothic style in 1810 for George Jeffreys. The Jeffreys family remained in possession of the castle until 1906, when the estate was broken up and sold at auction. The castle itself was bought by Robert John Spurrell (elder son of Daniel Spurrell of Bessingham, Norfolk), who remained there until his death in 1929. It was later the home of Sir Bernard and Lady Docker, and until September 2019, operated as a bed and breakfast.

Glandyfi Castle has been a Grade II listed building since 1964 as "the only castellated country house in the county". As of April 2020, the castle was again on the market. The property contains a number of gardens planted at different times in its history. It is located close to the site of Aberdyfi Castle, which dates back to 1156. According to Visit Wales in 2019, the castle provided guest accommodations in eight rooms. A Country Life magazine report in 2020 indicated that the property had been listed for sale, as "a ten-bedroom, ten-bathroom, five-reception room home" with "medieval-style atrium".

== Railway ==
From 1867 Glandyfi had a railway station on the Cambrian Railways between Dovey Junction and Borth. Glandyfi railway station was closed by the London Midland Region of British Railways on 14 June 1965. After closure the station building was converted to a private house. A public footpath runs from the approach road of the former station to Dovey Junction station.

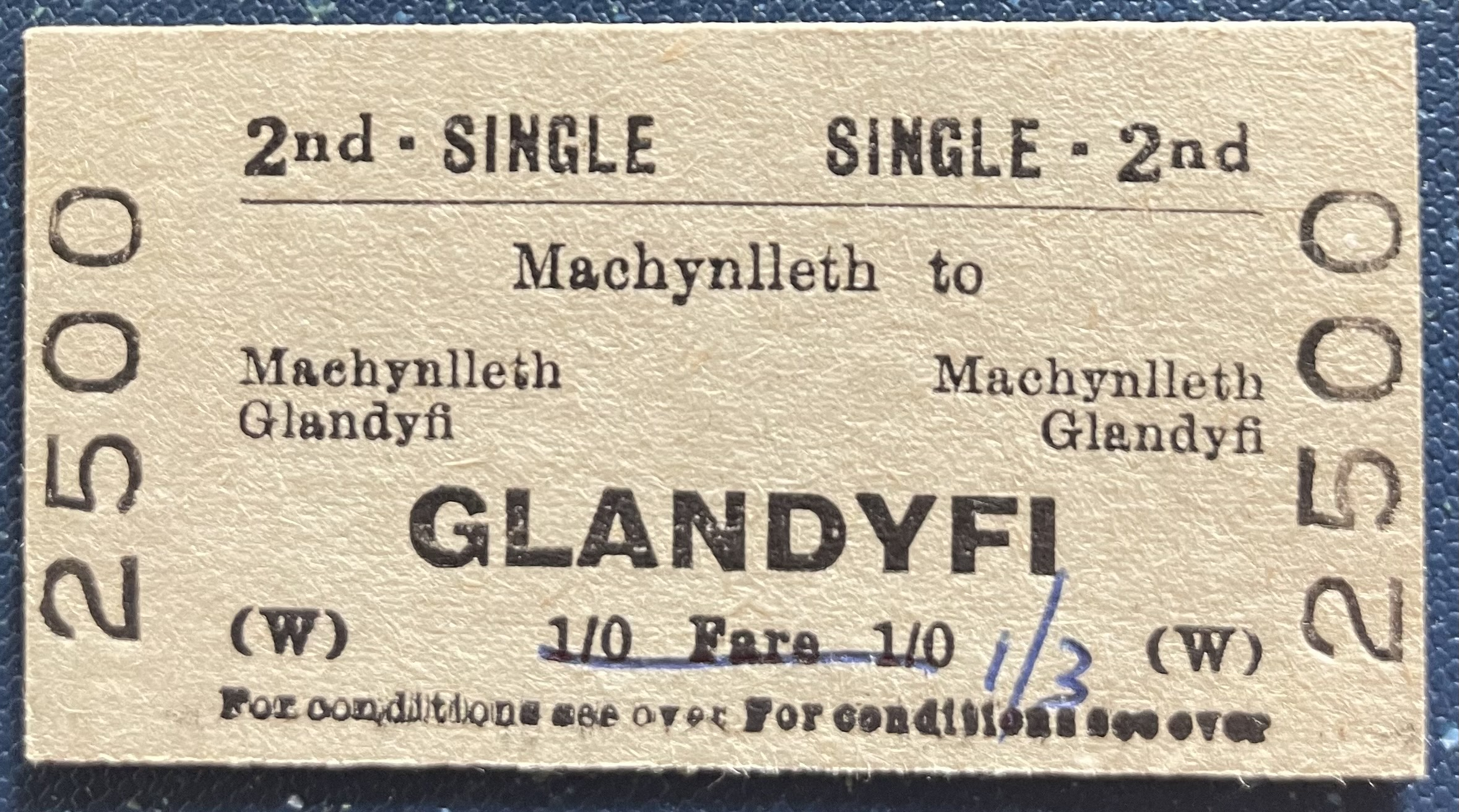
Second class single from Machynlleth to Glandyfi, issued 23 July 1964.

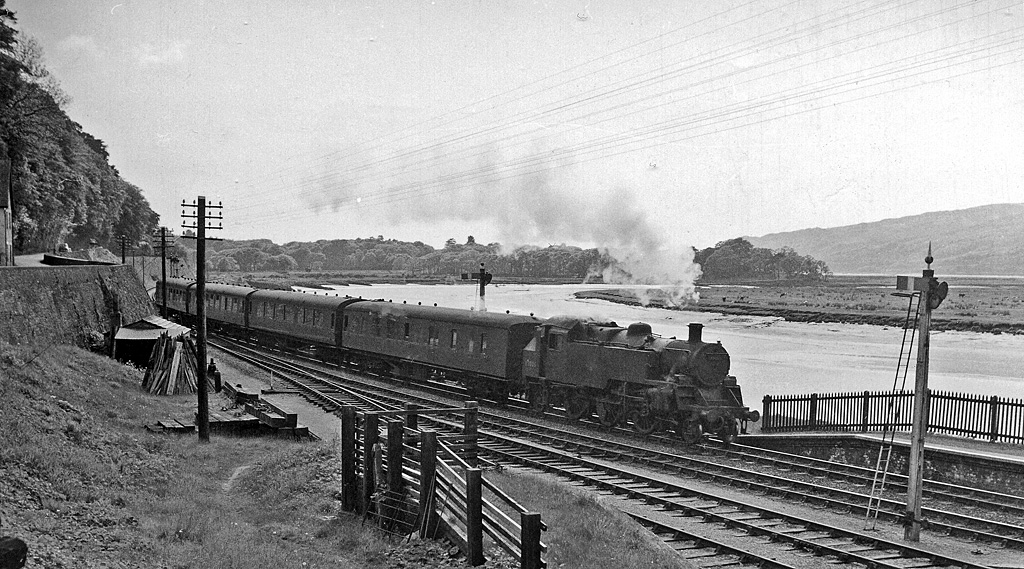
At one time Glandyfi had a railway station. This is a view in 1962
