= Dol-gau =

Village in Ceredigion, Wales

Coordinates: 52.462373°N 4.000856°W

Dol-gau: Welsh: Dôl-gau
- Location within Ceredigion
- OS grid reference: SN 6416 8682
  - Cardiff: 76.4 mi (123.0 km)
  - London: 177.5 mi (285.7 km)
- Community: Tirymynach
- Principal area: Ceredigion
- Country: Wales
- Sovereign state: United Kingdom
- Post town: Borth
- Postcode district: SY24
- Police: Dyfed-Powys
- Fire: Mid and West Wales
- Ambulance: Welsh
- UK Parliament: Ceredigion Preseli
- Senedd Cymru – Welsh Parliament: Ceredigion Penfro

Dol-gau (or Dôl-gau) is a small village in the community of Tirymynach, Ceredigion, Wales, which is 76.4 miles (123 km) from Cardiff and 177.5 miles (285.7 km) from London. Dol-gau is represented in the Senedd by Elin Jones (Plaid Cymru) and is part of the Ceredigion Preseli constituency in the House of Commons.

== Etymology ==
This name derives from the Welsh and means "an enclosed meadow".

== See also ==
- List of localities in Wales by population
