= Rhydypennau =

Rhydypennau may refer to

- Rhydypennau, Ceredigion - a hamlet in Ceredigion, Wales
- Rhydypennau, Cardiff - an area of Cardiff, Wales
  - Rhydypennau Library, a library serving Rhydypennau, Cardiff
