= Plas Cwmcynfelin =

House near Aberystwyth, Wales

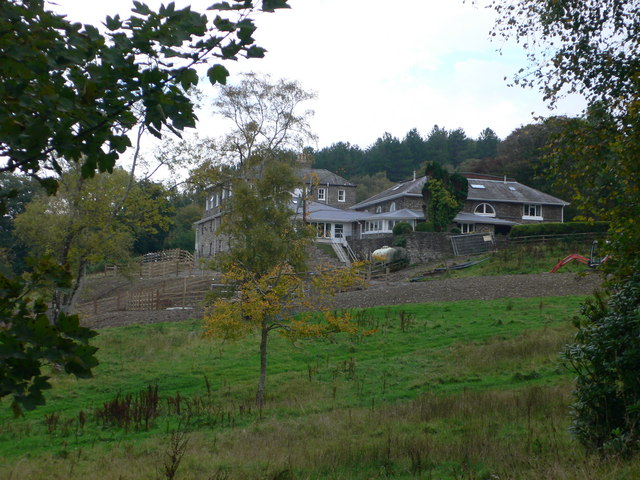
Plas Cwmcynfelin

Plas Cwmcynfelin is a house standing in its own grounds overlooking the village of Llangorwen, near Aberystwyth, Wales. A Grade II listed building , it is now home to the Plas Cwmcynfelin Care Home.

== History ==
In the 1700s the estate was owned by Matthew Davies, the High Sheriff of Cardiganshire for 1790. It descended in the family until it was divided between two sisters and was inherited by the Rev. Isaac Williams, a prominent member of the Oxford Movement.

== Notable residents ==
- J. H. Davies (1871–1926), lawyer, bibliographer and educationist
- Tom Macdonald (1900–1980), journalist and novelist
- Rev. Isaac Williams (1802–1865), clergyman and lecturer at Oxford
