= Castell Gwallter =

Castle ruins in Ceredigion, Wales

Coordinates: 52°27′41.2″N 4°1′48.34″W

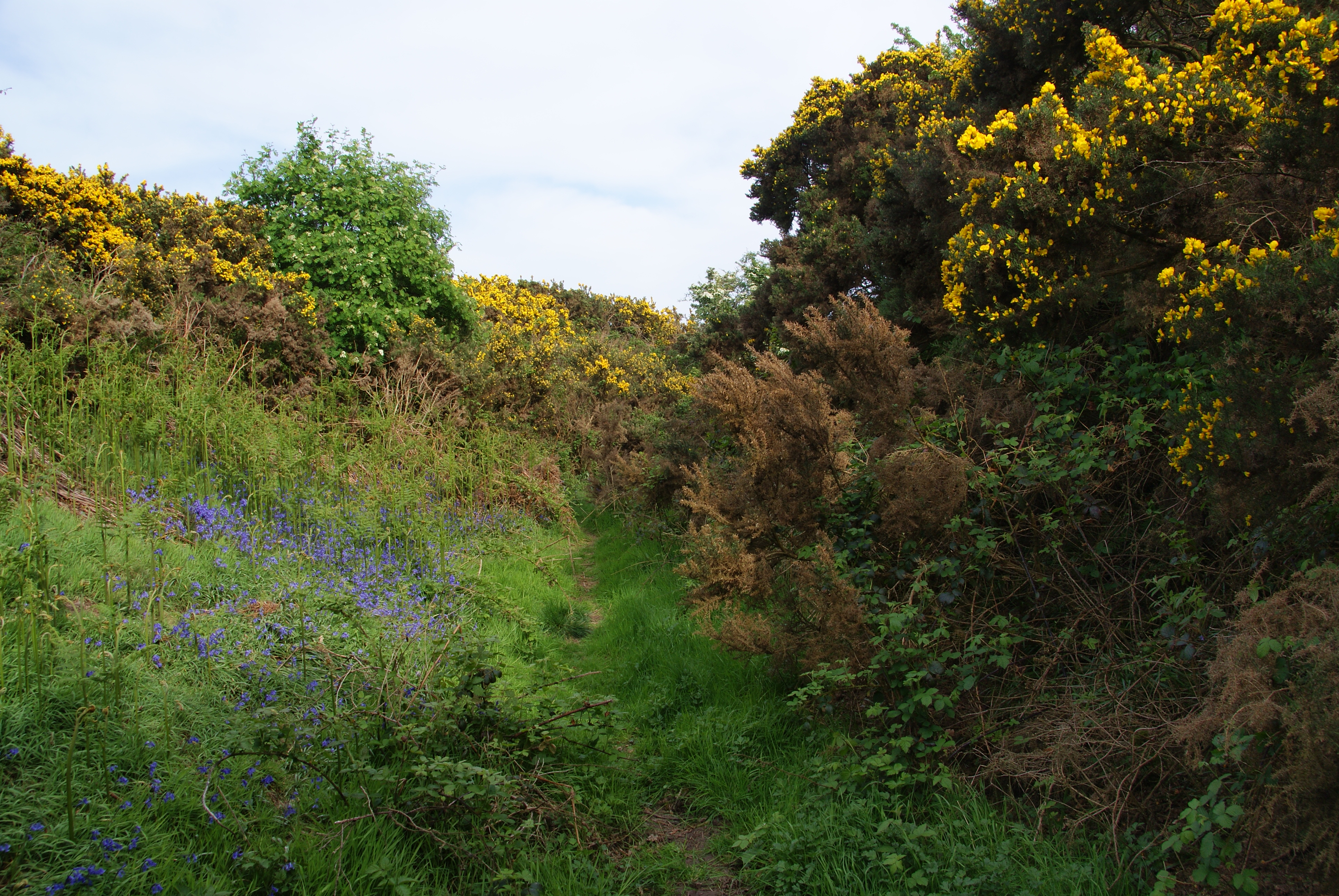
Inside the overgrown Castell Gwallter

Castell Gwallter, also known as Walter's Castle and sometimes Castell Penweddig, is the remains of a Norman motte-and-bailey castle situated on a large hill above the old village of Llandre (Llanfihangel Genau'r Glyn) in northern Ceredigion, Wales, four miles northeast of Aberystwyth.

== History ==
Castell Gwallter was built around 1120 by Walter de Bec, who was one of the tenants of Gilbert Fitz Richard. Walter was a "distinguished knight who had chief command at the 'Battle of the Standard' in 1138, and is said to have stood on the wagon of the Standards, and to have inspired his troops by an oration in a voice like a trumpet". He was one of the great feudal knights with estates in the North of England. The castle was captured in 1136 by Owain Gwynedd but was retaken in 1153 by Lord Rhys and his brothers. After this, history does not relate what happened to the castle, but it may have been demolished.

== The site ==
Castell Gwallter is situated in a prominent position about half a mile west of the village of Llandre. It is one of about 300 castles of its type in the area built to try to subdue the Welsh, a motte-and-bailey type fortification which originally had a tower built on a large mound. The motte is surrounded by a ditch and the inner bailey is small, and is surrounded by a larger outer enclosure. The whole site is very well-preserved and as there is no sign of building stone on top of the mound, the tower may have been made of wood. There is steep ground to the east and the north which provides natural defences, and the site is about 50 m (200 ft) higher than St Michael’s Church, Llandre to which it is adjacent.

== Visitor information ==
The castle is on private land but can be seen from a public right of way which passes close by.

== See also ==
- List of castles in Wales
- Castles in Great Britain and Ireland
