= Dovey Junction railway station =

Railway station in Powys, Wales

Dovey Junction Welsh: Cyffordd Dyfi
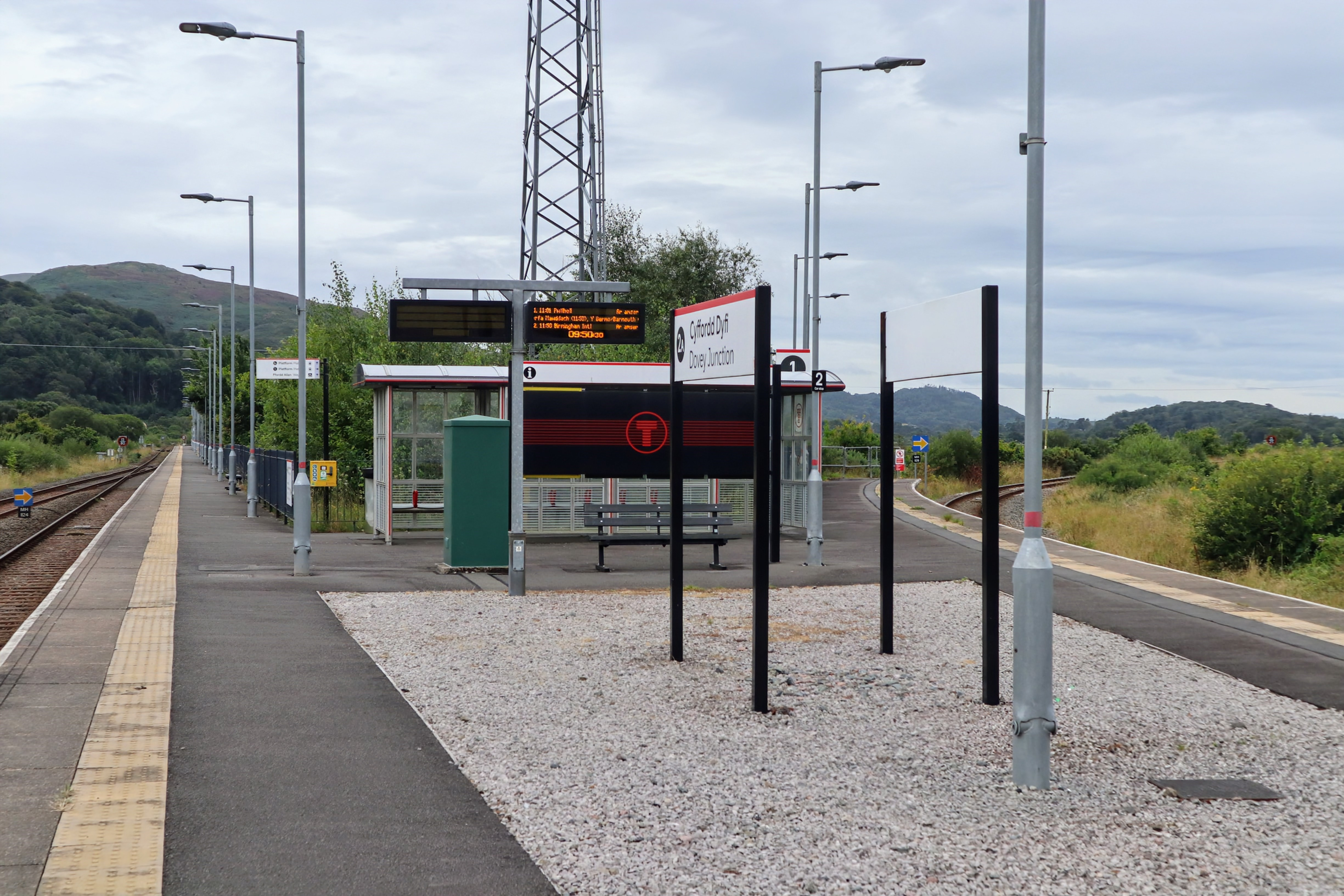
- Platforms 1 & 2a with 2b in the distance (2024)

General information
- Location: Derwenlas, Powys; Wales
- Coordinates: 52.564°N 3.924°W
- Grid reference: SN697980
- Manager: Transport for Wales
- Platforms: 2

Other information
- Station code: DVY
- Classification: DfT category F2

History
- Opened: 14 August 1867

Key dates
- 1 July 1904: Renamed Dovey Junction

Passengers
- 2021/22: ▲7,030
- Interchange: ▲2,575
- 2022/23: ▲9,190
- Interchange: ▲4,370
- 2023/24: ▲14,610
- Interchange: ▲7,847
- 2024/25: ▲41,454
- Interchange: ▲13,454
- 2025/26: ▼33,572
- Interchange: ▲15,273
Location
Notes
- Passenger statistics from the Office of Rail and Road

Dovey Junction (/ˈdʌviː-/ DUH-vee-; Welsh: Cyffordd Dyfi) is a railway station on the Cambrian Line in Wales. It is the junction where the line splits into the line to Aberystwyth and the Cambrian Coast Line to Pwllheli. Passenger services are provided by Transport for Wales. There is a single island platform. It is sited between Machynlleth to the east, Borth to the south, and Penhelig to the north, and is measured 79 miles 3 chains (127.2 km) from Whitchurch via Oswestry.

The station is in Powys, about 440 yards (400 m) north-east of the junction of three counties: the current principal areas of Ceredigion, Powys and Gwynedd, corresponding to the traditional counties of Cardiganshire, Montgomeryshire and Merionethshire.

== History ==
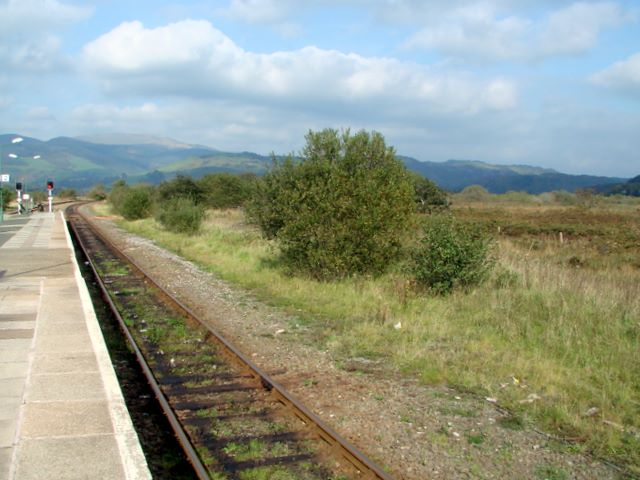
Looking towards Machynlleth in 2007, before the addition of the passing loop

The station was opened on 14 August 1867 as Glan Dovey Junction. It was renamed Dovey Junction in 1904.

The station has been rebuilt twice: the original Cambrian Railways buildings were first replaced in the 1970s by a flat-roofed station building. This building was subsequently replaced in the 1990s by a simple bus shelter, having fallen into a state of disrepair and being far larger than required at this remote location.

The station platforms were raised in 2008 in conjunction with raising of the tracks, to reduce the likelihood of closure of this section of line due to flooding. The work was part of a major programme of work on the Cambrian Line, including ERTMS signalling to replace the previous RETB system (installed in 2011).

The station house at the end of the path to the A487 was previously the stationmaster's house for Glandyfi station, but is now in private residence.

== Location ==
The station is in the midst of the Dyfi National Nature Reserve, near the Cardigan Bay coast. There is no settlement here but a 0.6-mile (1 km) footpath, from the western end of the Aberystwyth platform, provides passenger access to and from the hamlet of Glandyfi in Ceredigion, and to a main road (the A487).

== Facilities ==
As many passengers merely change trains at the station, there are only basic facilities, including a shelter, a help point, benches and live departure screens.

== Passenger volume ==
Passenger volume at Dovey Junction
	2004–05	2005–06	2006–07	2007–08	2008–09	2009–10	2010–11	2011–12	2012–13	2013–14	2014–15	2015–16	2016–17	2017–18	2018–19	2019–20	2020–21	2021–22	2022–23	2023–24	2024–25
Entries and exits	1,093	1,062	1,430	1,978	1,494	1,768	1,482	1,288	1,694	1,828	2,366	3,740	4,084	4,434	4,622	4,292	1,692	7,030	9,190	14,610	41,454
Interchanges	5,327	3,755	4,161	936	491	722	941	1,218	1,397	1,046	1,029	7,748	9,035	9,312	9,321	8,097	920	2,575	4,370	7,847	13,454

The statistics cover twelve month periods that start in April.

== Services ==
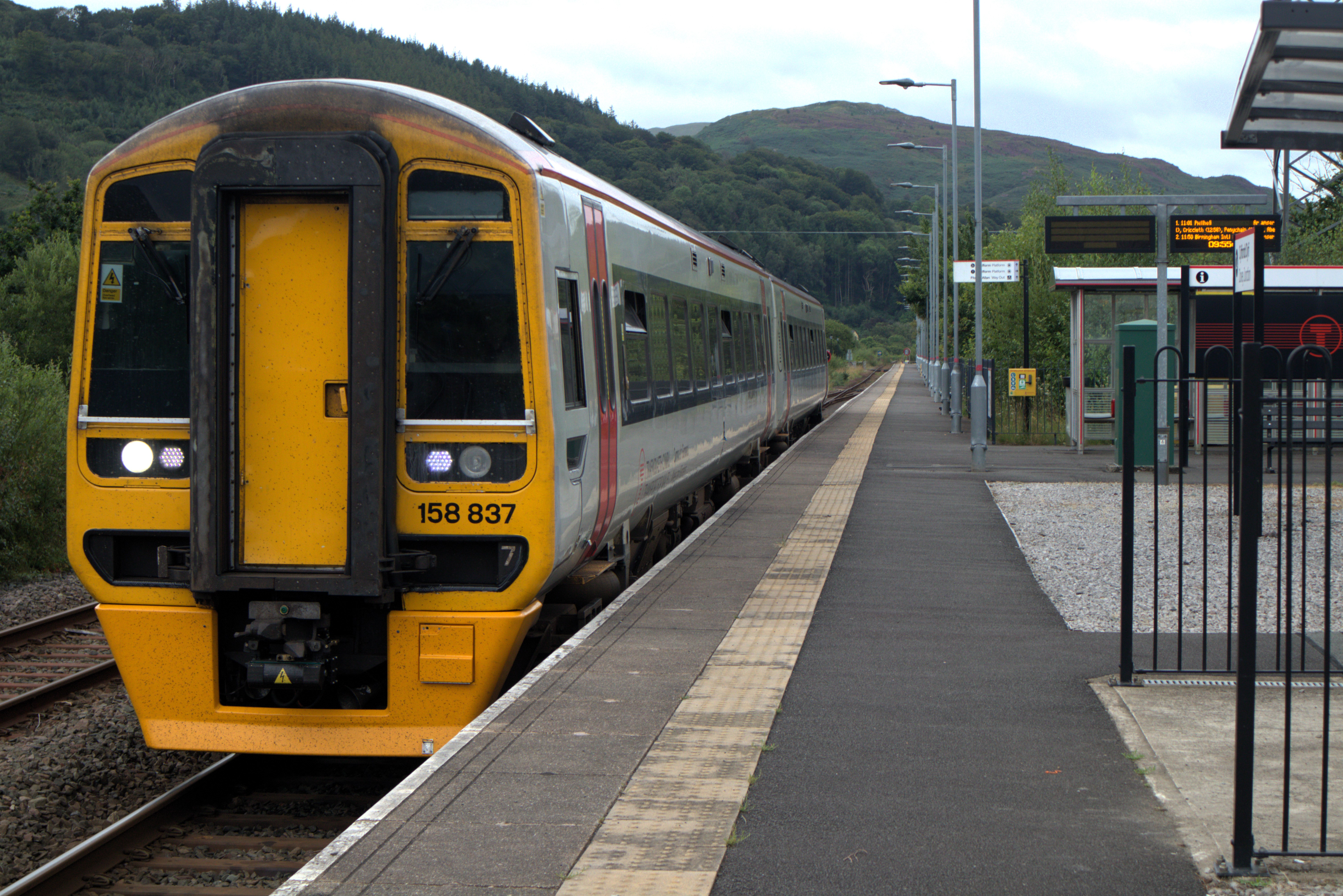
A train bound for Birmingham International calls at Dovey Junction (2024)

Trains call at least every two hours in each direction throughout the day (Mon–Sat), rising to once an hour during the morning and afternoon peaks and into the early evening. Platform 2 (east side) is used by services to/from Borth and Aberystwyth and platform 1 (west side) by trains along the coast to Barmouth and Pwllheli. Most trains serve both branches, with units joining or dividing at Machynlleth to make a 4-coach set east of there, though some trains (especially on Sundays) run between Birmingham or Shrewsbury and Aberystwyth only (some trains on both branches also start or end at Machynlleth). Platform 2 is split into 2a at the north end, alongside a passing loop, used by trains bound for Shrewsbury and Birmingham and 2b at the south end used by services bound for Aberystwyth allowing the branch to have a clock face hourly service at peak times.

On Sundays, there is a 2-hourly service between Shrewsbury and Aberystwyth all year, plus three trains each way in summer to/from Pwllheli but just a single train each way in the winter months.

Preceding station	National Rail	Following station
Borth	Transport for Wales Birmingham International-Aberystwyth	Machynlleth
Penhelig	Transport for Wales Shrewsbury-Pwllheli	Machynlleth
	Historical railways	
Penhelig; Line and station open	Cambrian Railways; Aberystwith and Welsh Coast Railway	Machynlleth; Line and station open
Glandyfi; Line open, station closed	Cambrian Railways; Aberystwith and Welsh Coast Railway	Machynlleth; Line and station open

== Community rail ==
The station, along with all others on the Cambrian Line, is part of the Cambrian Railway Partnership, a community rail organisation.

== Bibliography ==
- Caton, Peter (2018). Remote Stations. Leicestershire: Matador. ISBN 978-1-78901-408-2.
- Quick, Michael (2023). Railway Passenger Stations in Great Britain: A Chronology (PDF) (5th ed.). London: Railway and Canal Historical Society.
