= Wynne Melville Jones =

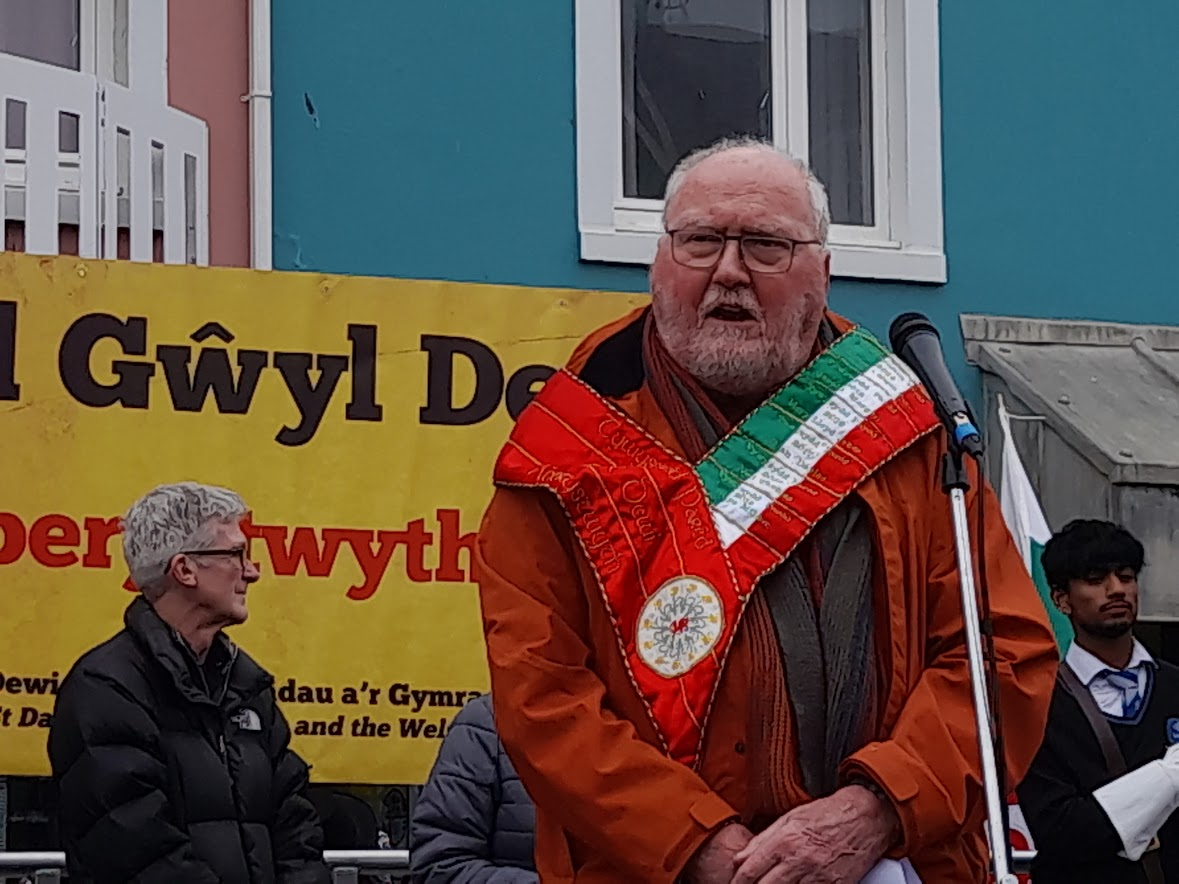
- Born: 7 August 1947 (age 79); Tregaron, Wales
- Occupations: artist, entrepreneur

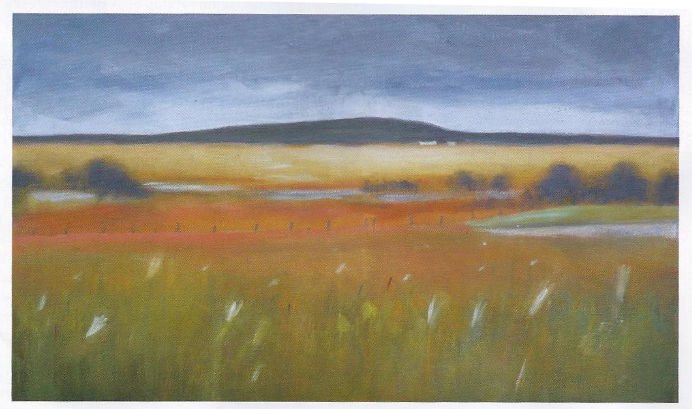
Mur my Bebyd by Wynne Melville Jones

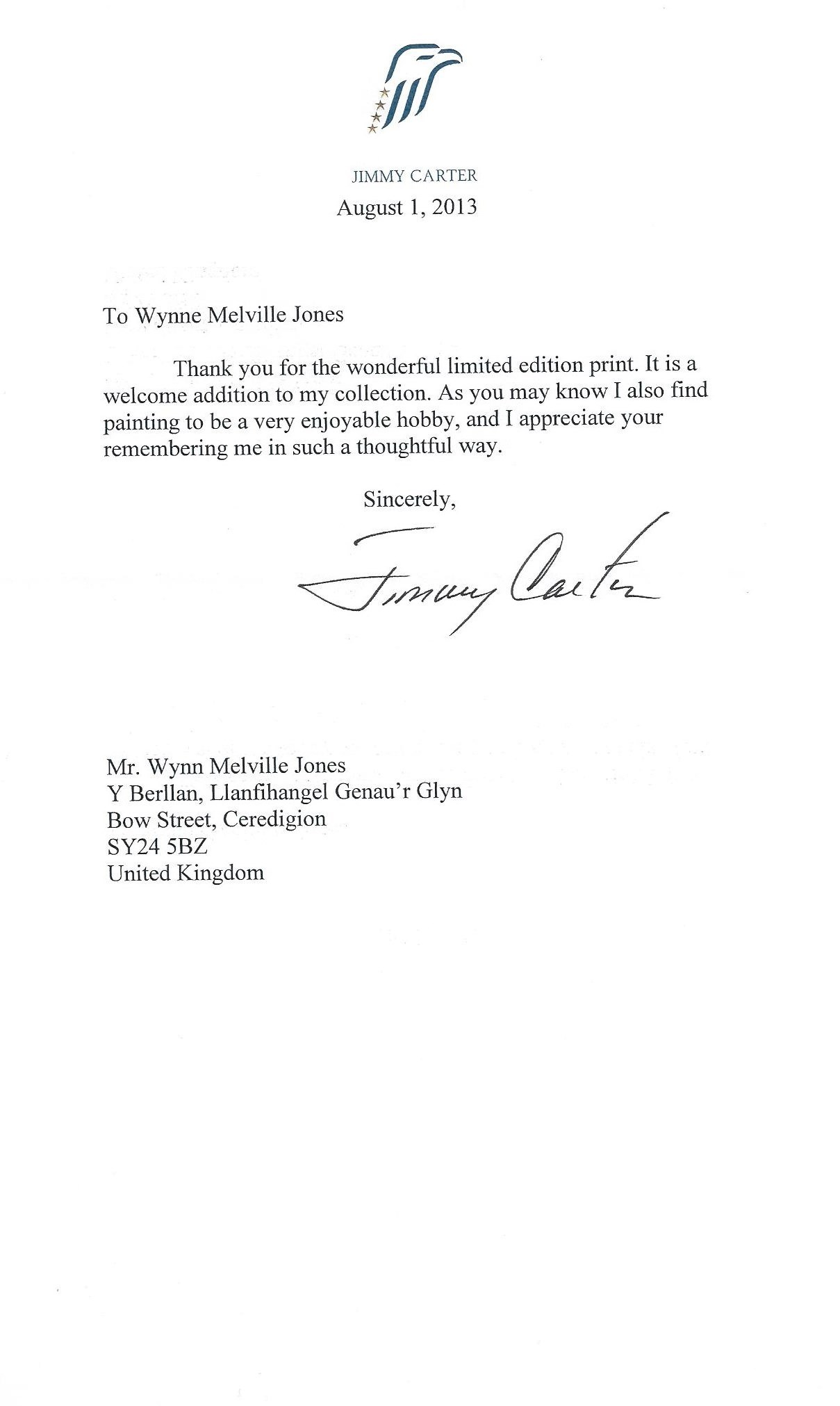
Letter to Wynne Melville Jones from President Jimmy Carter

Wynne Melville Jones (often known as Wyn Mel; born 7 August 1947) is a Welsh artist and entrepreneur who was also involved in public relations and the modernisation of the Urdd Gobaith Cymru movement.

He was an art student and by 2015 he had returned to his first love, art, and was working from his home in Llanfihangel Genau'r Glyn where he is active in the community. His autobiography Y Fi a Mistar Urdd a ir Cwmni Da was published in 2010 and Wyn Mel also in 2010. He is one of the founders of Banc Bro Llanfihangel Genau'r Glyn, a community initiative to promote the social and cultural life of the community.

== Early life ==
Jones was born in Tregaron, Ceredigion. He attended Ysgol Uwchradd Tregaron where he came under the influence of Ogwyn Davies, his Art teacher. He then followed a one-year course at Swansea College of Art before following a Teacher's Course in Art and Drama at Trinity University College, Carmarthen. At the college he was vice-president of the Students' Union and founded a bilingual magazine 'WEEDS', for the college's short-term students.

== Urdd Gobaith Cymru ==
In 1969 he was appointed Organiser of the Urdd Gobaith Cymru in Carmarthenshire and within two years he was moved to the headquarters in Aberystwyth to be responsible for the organisation's publicity and public relations. Following the Investiture of Prince Charles in Caernarfon, the organisation's morale was very low and the organisation was torn apart by the Investiture and Charles' visit to the Urdd's National Eisteddfod. Wynne organised a number of large national campaigns in order to raise the profile and spirit of the organisation, including the 'World's Biggest Balloon Race' campaign when 100,000 balloons were released at the Urdd Camp in Llangrannog. A few years later he invented the character Mistar Urdd, the tricolour character established on the Urdd logo and which came to life in 1979. Mistar Urdd became heavily associated with the Urdd's branding, appearing on many items sold by them. In 2016 it was still being used by the organisation to attract children to its ranks. Jones also created a friend for Mr Urdd called Pen Gwyn, a penguin from the Colony of Y Wladfa.

Wynne is a former Chairman of the Urdd Council and Honorary President of the Urdd Gobaith Cymru for life.

== Strata Matrix Company ==
In 1979 he left the Urdd and founded a bilingual PR company - the first in Wales - StrataMatrix which he managed for 30 years. The company had offices in Aberystwyth and Cardiff. 'Strata Matrix' represented a large number of Welsh national companies and organisations. He founded 'Cymdeithas Public Relations Cymru' and changed their name to: 'Cyswllt'.

== Magazine ==
With Dylan Iorwerth and Roy Stephens he founded a magazine Cwmni Golwg which has its headquarters in Llambed.

== Art ==
Since retiring he has continued his involvement in art, and set about painting Cors Caron in the four seasons in 2011. He often depicts Welsh icons and the Pembrokeshire landscape. His work was shown in Aberaeron, Aberystwyth, Abergwaun, Cardiff, Tregaron, Bala and London.

A number of his pictures have created interest outside of Wales including the picture of Soar-y-Mynydd, owned by former US President Jimmy Carter. A painting of a Elvis Presley rock was sent to Graceland.

In 2015 he lived in Llanfihangel Genau'r Glyn with his wife Linda and has two daughters, four grandsons and one granddaughter.

== Bibliography ==
- Erthygl ar lythyr Carter, Western Mail, 24 December 2012
- Erthygl ar lythyr Carter, Golwg, 2 May 2013
