= Gwenan Jones =

Welsh historian (1889–1971)

Gwenan Jones (3 November 1889 – 12 January 1971) was a Welsh cultural historian, and was the first woman to stand in a general election for Plaid Cymru.

Jones studied for a master's degree at the University of Wales, then received a doctorate from the University of Minnesota in 1918, both in Welsh literature. She then became a lecturer at University of Wales, Aberystwyth, settling in Llandre. Jones became prominent in the Undeb Cymru Fydd, and on behalf of it, was a founder of the Wales International Society.

At the 1945 general election, Jones stood for the University of Wales constituency, taking 24.5% of the vote, was the first female Plaid candidate at a general election, and the only Plaid Cymru candidate in 1945 to hold her deposit. Despite this relative success, Jones felt disappointed at the party's lack of progress, and did not stand for election again. However, she remained involved with the party; in 1949, she chaired the launch of Plaid's "Parliament for Wales in Five Years" campaign.

Jones also became the president of the Welsh teachers' union, Undeb Cenedlaethol Athrawon Cymru.

In 1948, Jones took in a Latvian family from a displaced persons camp in Germany. The mother of the family initially worked as Jones' housekeeper, but later became a teacher and artist.
