= Penhelig railway station =

Railway station in Gwynedd, Wales

Penhelig Welsh: Penhelyg
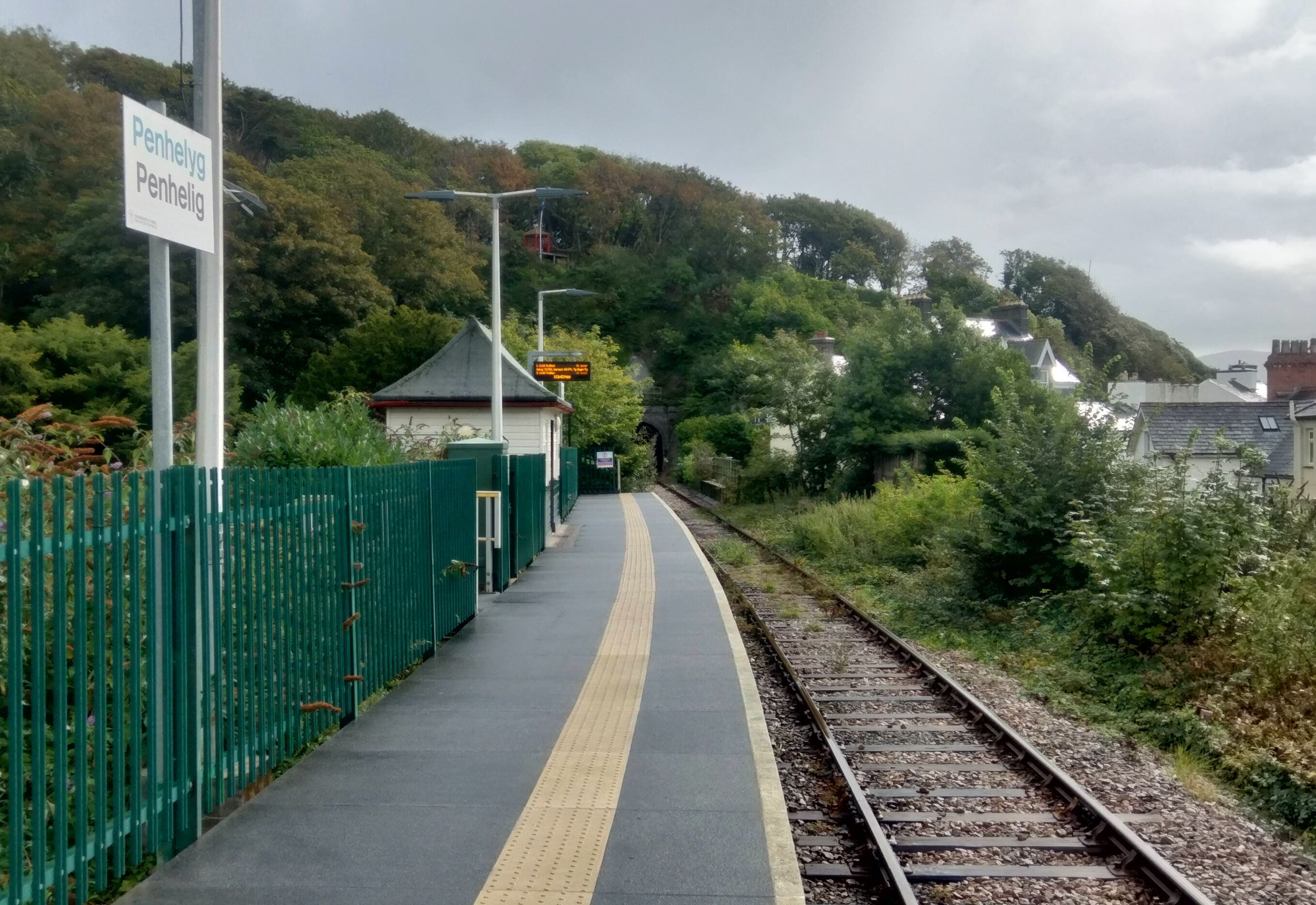

General information
- Location: Aberdyfi, Gwynedd; Wales
- Coordinates: 52.546°N 4.035°W
- Grid reference: SN620961
- Manager: Transport for Wales
- Platforms: 1

Other information
- Station code: PHG
- Classification: DfT category F2

Key dates
- 8 May 1933: opened

Passengers
- 2021/22: ▲3,510
- 2022/23: ▲6,050
- 2023/24: ▲6,584
- 2024/25: ▲8,192
- 2025/26: ▲10,286
Location
Notes
- Passenger statistics from the Office of Rail and Road

Penhelig railway station (Welsh: Penhelyg) serves the eastern outskirts of the seaside resort of Aberdyfi in Gwynedd, Wales. Its situation is unusual, being located on a short length of sharply curved single track between two tunnels. It is on the Cambrian Line between Aberdovey and Dovey Junction, 84 miles 8 chains (135.3 km) from Whitchurch, measured via Oswestry (the original line diverging at Welshpool).

Although named after the hamlet of Penhelig, it is actually closer to some parts of Aberdyfi.

== History ==
Although the line through the current station opened in 1863, the station itself was opened by the Great Western Railway in 1933. This was due to complaints from locals about the distance to the station at Aberdovey.

The station was originally named Penhelig Halt, but was renamed on 6 May 1968.

Between 1 January and 30 March 2018, the station was closed as Network Rail replaced the previous timber platform with an improved structure coated with glass reinforced plastic. This is intended to reduce the need for maintenance work. The station lighting was also improved with the addition of a dot matrix display for train departures, as well as improvements on the tunnels either side of the station. During the closure, Arriva Trains Wales provided a taxi service to those wishing to use the station.

== Facilities ==
There are no ticketing facilities at the station, and it is unstaffed. The station features a traditional GWR pagoda shelter, which includes original wooden seating, and provides good shelter from the weather. It was restored during the station's reconstruction in 2018 featuring a fresh coat of paint, new flooring, windows and roof. There is also no car park, but a bus shelter is located outside the station, on the opposite side of the road. As there are no facilities to purchase tickets, passengers must buy one in advance, or from the guard on the train.

== Passenger volume ==
Passenger volume at Penhelig
	2004–05	2005–06	2006–07	2007–08	2008–09	2009–10	2010–11	2011–12	2012–13	2013–14	2014–15	2015–16	2016–17	2017–18	2018–19	2019–20	2020–21	2021–22	2022–23	2023–24	2024–25
Entries and exits	106,858	108,745	91,975	95,664	124,106	122,404	122,322	131,910	142,014	143,786	159,684	162,852	156,252	164,564	159,854	168,668	35,110	127,012	142,272	158,352	162,898

The statistics cover twelve month periods that start in April.

== Services ==
The station has eight services each day, west to Pwllheli and east to Machynlleth and Shrewsbury. Trains stop on request.

Preceding station	National Rail	Following station
Aberdovey	Transport for Wales; Cambrian Coast Line	Dovey Junction
	Historical railways	
Aberdovey; Line and station open	Great Western Railway; Aberystwith and Welsh Coast Railway	Dovey Junction; Line and station open

== Bibliography ==
- Christiansen, Rex; Miller, RW (1971). The Cambrian Railways: volume I: 1852-1888. Newton Abbot: David & Charles. ISBN 9780715352366.
- Quick, Michael (2023). Railway Passenger Stations in Great Britain: A Chronology (PDF) (5th ed.). London: Railway and Canal Historical Society.
- Wills, Dixe (2014). Tiny Stations (Paperback, 1st reprint ed.). Basingstoke: AA Publishing. ISBN 978-0-7495-7732-2.
