= Pen-y-garn, Ceredigion =

Village in Ceredigion, Wales

Coordinates: 52.449722°N 4.022778°W

Pen-y-garn
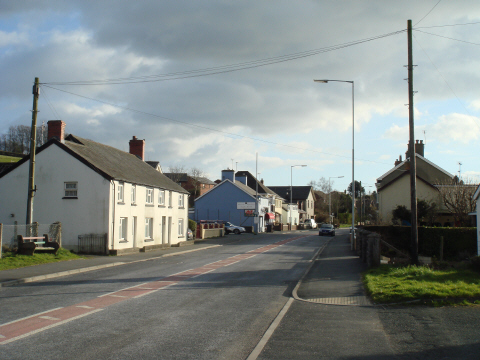
- Pen-y-garn, looking south towards Bow Street

- Location within Ceredigion
- Population: 1,888
- Language: British English; Welsh (68.8% of population)
- OS grid reference: SN6285
- Principal area: Ceredigion
- Preserved county: Dyfed
- Country: Wales
- Sovereign state: United Kingdom
- Post town: BOW STREET
- Postcode district: SY24
- Dialling code: 01970
- Police: Dyfed-Powys
- Fire: Mid and West Wales
- Ambulance: Welsh
- UK Parliament: Ceredigion Preseli
- Senedd Cymru – Welsh Parliament: Ceredigion Penfro

Pen-y-garn is a small village in the Tirymynach district of Ceredigion, Wales, approximately 4 miles (6 km) north-east of Aberystwyth. Along with the hamlet of Rhydypennau, Pen-y-garn is now often considered to be part of the neighbouring larger village of Bow Street. All three places stretch in a long narrow strip along the main Aberystwyth to Machynlleth road (A487). As well as the houses on the main road from Cross Street (Y Lon Groes) up to Ysgol Rhydypennau, Pen-y-garn also includes the housing estates of Maes Ceiro, Bryn Meillion, Maes y Garn and Cae'r Odyn.

== History ==
=== Toponymy ===
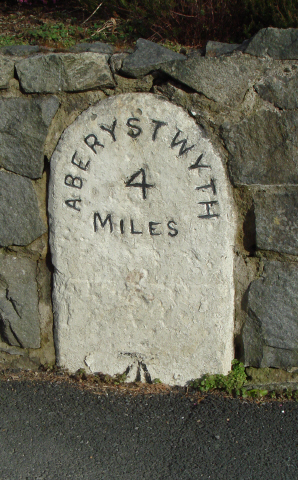
Old milestone at Pen-y-garn

Pen-y-garn (head of the cairn) derives its name from its proximity to a former Bronze Age cairn known as Carn Maelgwyn, which is believed to have once stood near the present Capel y Garn somewhere in the vicinity of what is now Maes Ceiro (formerly known as Cae Dôlmaelgwyn). The cairn is remembered in the house names of 'Maelgwyn House' and 'Llys Maelgwyn'. It appears to have been destroyed in the eighteenth-century, when its stone seems to have been plundered for work on the nearby turnpike road (now represented by the A487).

=== Archaeology ===
On the hill overlooking Pen-y-garn, called Foel Goch, is Caergywydd farm. John Graham Williams claimed that the hill was the site of a small hillfort connected with the larger nearby Iron Age hillfort of Hen Gaer. But his claims with regard to this have not been substantiated, and appear to be based solely on the name of the farm and its position, as well as a misplaced belief that the first element of this was the Welsh word 'caer' meaning 'a fort'. However the earliest available attestations of the farm name are in the form 'Cae’r Gowydd', where the words 'cae’r' means 'the field' and not 'a fort'. Neither was the original farm on its present location. Rather it was actually some distance down the slopes of the hill on the north side of the Aberystwyth to Machynlleth road, near to Bow Street brook, and its name is probably connected with this location instead of that of the current farmhouse.

== Religious buildings ==
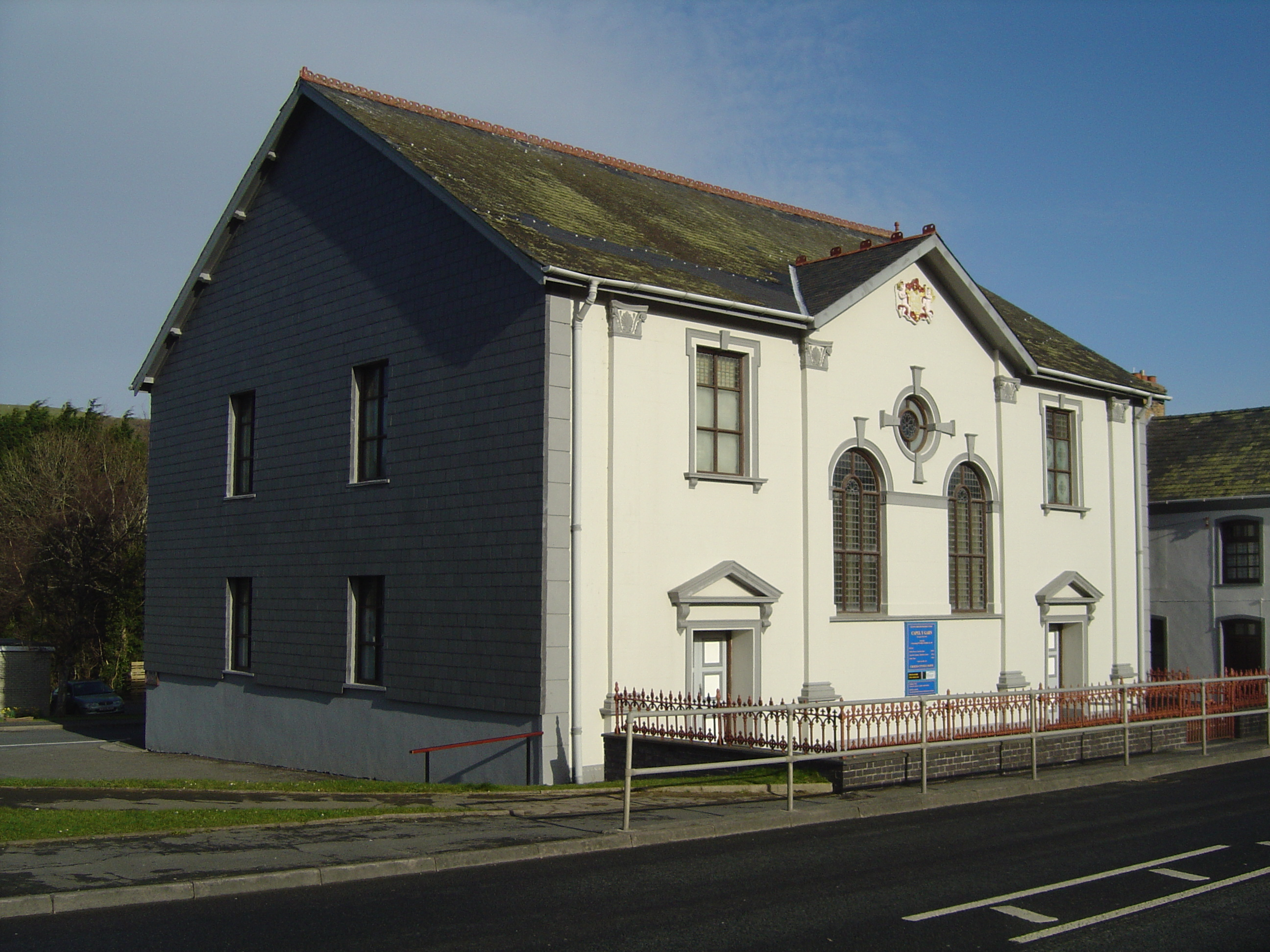
'Capel y Garn', the Calvinistic Methodist Chapel in Pen-y-garn

At the heart of Pen-y-garn is a Calvinistic Methodist chapel called 'Capel y Garn'. Evan Richardson, teacher John Elias and Hugh Owen were the first Nonconformists or dissenters to preach in the area in about 1780. A chapel was first erected in 1793, and a new chapel was built on the site in 1833 after the congregation grew too large.

== Services ==
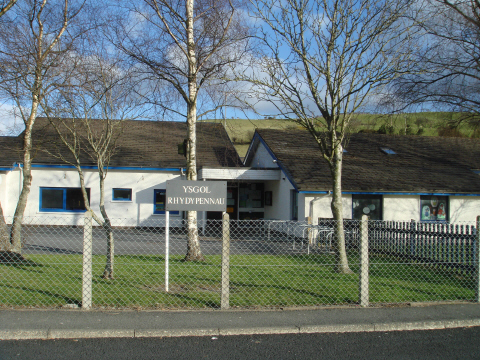
Ysgol Rhydypennau

Pen-y-garn has a butcher's shop (formerly I. O. Thomas but now called Bow Street Butchery), and a fish and chip shop (taken over by new owners, and renamed 'Greenfield Fish & Chips', it now offers Chinese takeaway food as well).

The present Ysgol Rhydypennau is actually located in Pen-y-garn, though the old Rhydypennau school building overlooks nearby Rhydypennau.

== Notable residents ==
- Dewi Morgan (1877–1971), bard, scholar and journalist, who lived at 'Garn House'
- Tom Macdonald (1900–1980), journalist and novelist, who lived the a cottage now called 'Llys Aeron'
- J. T. Rees (1857–1949), musician and composer

== Bibliography ==
- Macdonald, Tom (1975). The White Lanes of Summer. Macmillan, London. ISBN 0-333-17975-7
