= Borth railway station =

Railway station in Ceredigion, Wales

Borth
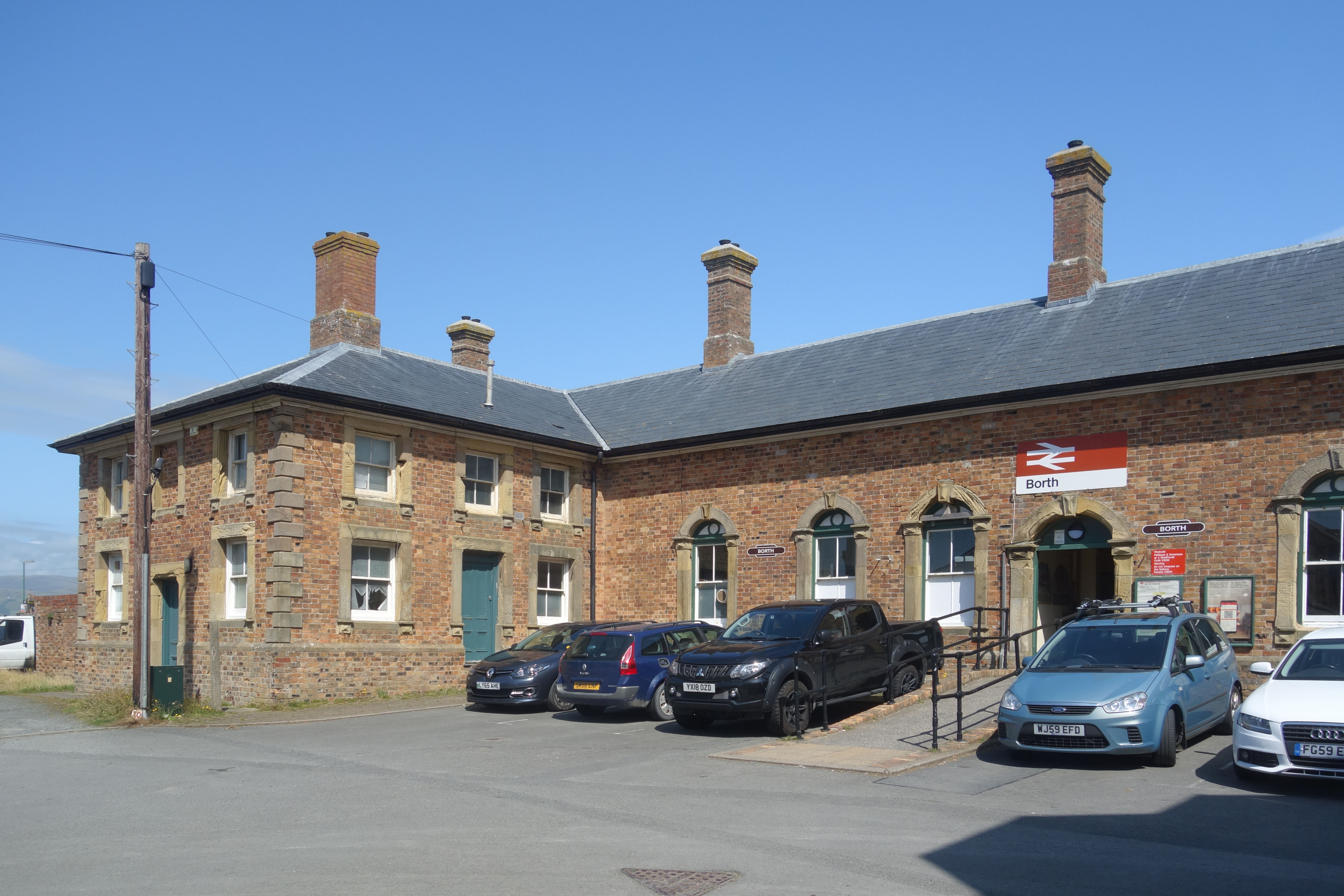

General information
- Location: Borth, Ceredigion; Wales
- Coordinates: 52.491°N 4.050°W
- Grid reference: SN609900
- Managed by: Transport for Wales
- Platforms: 1

Other information
- Station code: BRH
- Classification: DfT category F2

History
- Opened: 1 July 1863
- Original company: Aberystwith and Welsh Coast Railway
- Pre-grouping: Cambrian Railways
- Post-grouping: Great Western Railway

Passengers
- 2020/21: ▼8,444
- 2021/22: ▲32,764
- 2022/23: ▲44,902
- 2023/24: ▲57,948
- 2024/25: ▲61,940

Listed Building – Grade II
- Designated: 8 December 1997
- Reference no.: 19150
Location
Notes
- Passenger statistics from the Office of Rail and Road

Borth railway station serves the village of Borth, near Aberystwyth, Wales. It is a stop on the Cambrian Line between Shrewsbury and Aberystwyth.

== History ==
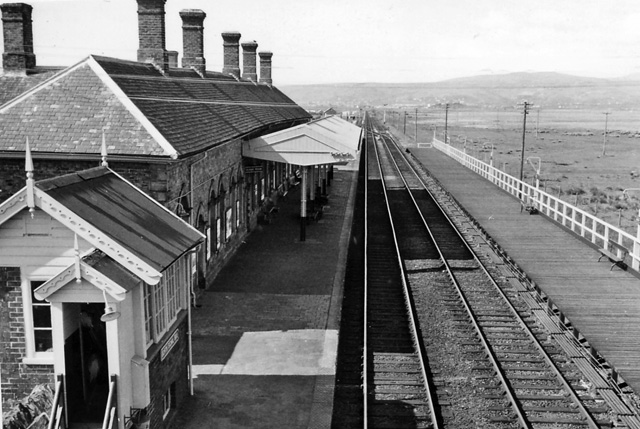
Borth station in 1962

The station was opened by the Aberystwith and Welsh Coast Railway on 1 July 1863, along with the section of line between Machynlleth and Borth.

It originally had two platforms with a goods yard to the north, but is now an unstaffed halt.

The station was host to a Great Western Railway camping coach from 1934 to 1939; one was also positioned here by the Western Region from 1952 to 1962. In 1963, the administration of camping coaches at the station was taken over by the London Midland; there was a coach here from 1963 to 1968 and two coaches from 1969 to 1971.

Due to severe flood damage, services between Machynlleth and Aberystwyth were suspended between 2 January and 14 April. The flooding caused the track to move vertically (rather than buckle, caused by extreme heat) and parts of the embankment were washed away.

The original station building still remains and is Grade II listed; it is in private commercial use apart from one room, which provides a waiting room for passengers. The station was adopted under Arriva Trains Wales Station Adoption Scheme and has won a number of community awards.

In January 2011, volunteers started to convert an unused part of the waiting room and the long-closed booking office into a museum; this was completed in July 2011. The museum now houses various collections, including Village History, Railway & Industrial Heritage, Natural History and Environmental displays.

== Facilities ==
Train running information is provided by the standard combination of digital CIS displays, timetable poster boards and customer help point installed at most TfW-managed stations. Step-free access is available from the entrance and car park to the platform.

== In popular culture ==
The museum and station play a key role in series 1, episode 4, entitled "The Girl in the Water", of Y Gwyll (Hinterland in English); this was transmitted on S4C in 2013 and BBC One Wales in January 2014. In 2019, Derek Brockway visited Borth Station Museum as part of his walk from Ynyslas to Aberystwyth, on his BBC programme Weatherman Walking.

== Services ==
Trains call at least every two hours in each direction on Mondays-Saturdays; this rises to hourly during morning and afternoon peak periods and into the evening. Services operate to Aberystwyth westbound and either Machynlleth, Shrewsbury or Birmingham International eastbound.

A similar frequency operates on Sundays, but starting later in the day.

Preceding station	National Rail	Following station
Bow Street	Transport for Wales Birmingham International-Aberystwyth	Dovey Junction
	Historical railways	
Llandre; Line open, station closed	Cambrian Railways; Aberystwith and Welsh Coast Railway	Ynyslas; Line open, station closed
