= C. E. Wynn-Williams =

Welsh physicist

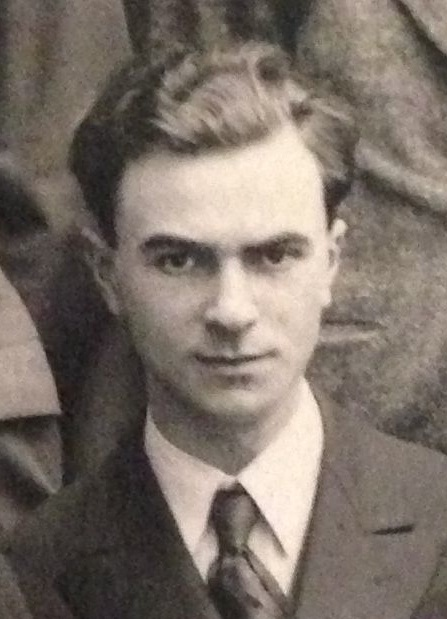
- Wynn-Williams at the Cavendish Laboratory in 1927
- Born: Charles Eryl Wynn-Williams; 5 March 1903 'Glasfryn', Uplands, Swansea, Glamorganshire, Wales
- Died: 30 August 1979 (aged 76) 'Bryn Elmen', Dôl-y-Bont, Dyfed, Wales
- Education: Grove Park School, Wrexham
- Alma mater: University College of North Wales and Trinity College, Cambridge
- Spouse: Annie Eiluned James
- Children: 2
- Awards: Duddell Medal and Prize (1957)
- Scientific career
- Fields: Physicist
- Workplaces: Imperial College, London, Telecommunications Research Establishment
- Doctoral advisor: Ernest Rutherford

Charles Eryl Wynn-Williams (5 March 1903 – 30 August 1979), was a Welsh physicist, noted for his research on electronic instrumentation for use in nuclear physics. His work on the scale-of-two counter contributed to the development of the modern computer.

== Early life and studies ==
Wynn-Williams was born at 'Glasfryn' in Swansea, Glamorganshire, Wales, on 5 March 1903. He was the eldest child of William Williams (1863–1945), a physics teacher and later divisional inspector of schools for north and mid-Wales, and Mary Ellen Wynn (1907–1935), known as Nell, daughter of Robert Wynn, a shopkeeper in Llanrwst. His education was at Grove Park School in Wrexham, and, from 1920, at Bangor University, where he graduated in 1923. He stayed at this university to undertake research work on electrical instrumentation, and gained the degree of MSc from the University of Wales in 1924. He was known as C. E. Wynn-Williams from his time at University onwards.

Wynn-Williams was Liberal in politics and was a Welsh-speaker. On 12 August 1943 he married in London Annie Eiluned James (b. 1907/8), a school-teacher, with whom he had two sons.

== Prewar research ==
In October 1925 he entered Trinity College, Cambridge, having been awarded a University of Wales open fellowship. Initially he continued research into short electric waves at the Cavendish Laboratory under the supervision of Sir Ernest Rutherford, and was awarded the degree of PhD for this work in 1929.

Wynn-Williams' most significant work in this period, however, was in the development of electronic instrumentation for use in radioactivity and nuclear physics. Like many scientists at that time he was a Wireless enthusiast.

In 1926 he employed his electronics skills to construct an amplifier using thermionic valves (vacuum tubes) for very small electrical currents. It was realized that such devices could be used in the detection and counting of Alpha particles in the nuclear disintegration experiments then being undertaken by Rutherford, who encouraged him to devote his attention to the construction of a reliable valve amplifier and methods of registering and counting particles.

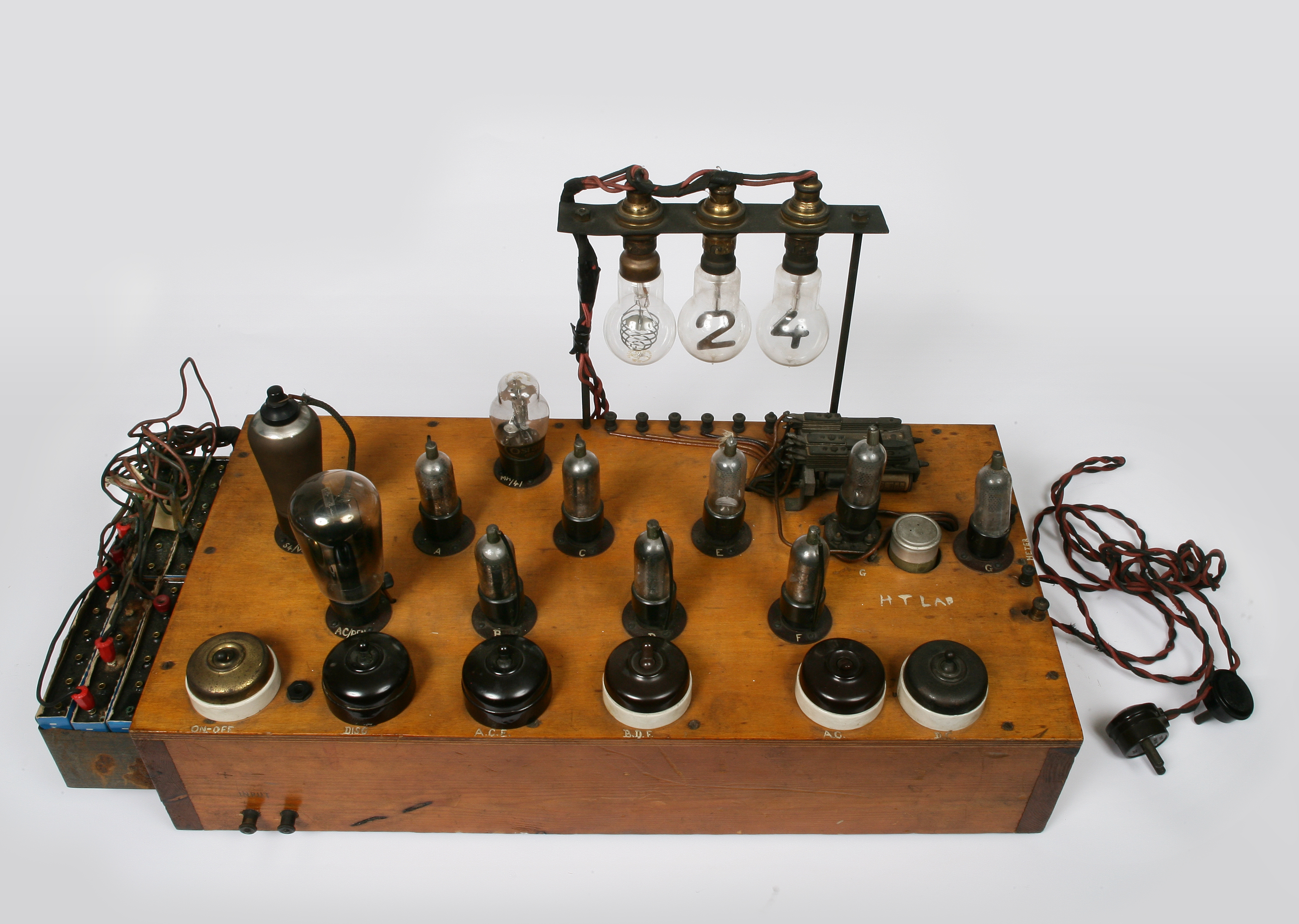
Wynn-Williams' scale-of-two counter (with permission of the Cavendish Laboratory, University of Cambridge, UK)

There followed a series of brilliant contributions to the armamentarium of nuclear physics. In 1929–30, with H. M. Cave and F. A. B. Ward he designed and constructed a binary prescaler for an electro-mechanical counter using thyratrons. By 1931 a valve amplifier and thyratron-based automatic counting system were in regular use in the Cavendish Laboratory. Wynn-Williams' amplifier played an important part in James Chadwick's discovery of the neutron in 1932, and in numerous other experiments.

In 1932 Wynn-Williams published details of his thyratron-based scale-of-two counter, which allowed particles to be counted at much higher rates than previously. His devices became crucial unifying elements in the hardware of the emergent discipline of nuclear physics, as they opened up new avenues of research. They were widely copied in laboratories in Europe and the United States of America, often with advice from Wynn-Williams.

In 1935 Wynn-Williams was appointed assistant lecturer in physics at Imperial College, London. Continuing his work on electronic instrumentation he contributed to the development of nuclear physics at Imperial under G. P. Thomson.

== Wartime ==
On the eve of the Second World War, Wynn-Williams, like many of his scientific contemporaries, was recruited to work on the developing discipline of radio detection and ranging (RADAR) at the Telecommunications Research Establishment, later the Royal Radar Establishment, Malvern.

On 1 February 1942, the Allied success in breaking Nazi German naval Enigma messages suffered a serious setback. This was due to the adoption, for the North Atlantic U-boat traffic, of an Enigma machine with an additional rotor — the four-wheel Enigma. This increased the time required of the Turing-designed Bombe machines by a factor of 26. Higher speed bombes were therefore needed and Wynn-Williams was called in to contribute to one of the streams of development of high-speed Bombes.

The Post Office team developed a Bombe attachment for a standard three-wheel Bombe containing high speed wheels and an electronic sensing unit. It was attached to the Bombe by a very thick cable and was dubbed the Cobra Bombe. Twelve were made at the Mawdsley engineering factory in Dursley, Gloucestershire, but turned out to be unreliable, so the other stream of development at the British Tabulating Machine Company at Letchworth was preferred. Both machines were subsequently overshadowed by the great success of the US Navy Bombes.

Towards the end of 1942 the previously experimental non-Morse transmissions from teleprinter cipher machines were being received in greater numbers by the British Signals Intelligence collection sites. The one using the Lorenz SZ 40/42, code-named Tunny at the Government Code and Cypher School at Bletchley Park, was used for high-level traffic between German High Command and field commanders. A young chemistry graduate, Bill Tutte worked out how it could in theory be broken. He took the idea to his boss, the mathematician Max Newman, who realised that the only feasible way to apply the method, was by automating it.

Knowing of Wynn-Williams' work on electronic counters at Cambridge, he called for his help. He worked with a team from the Post Office Research Station at Dollis Hill, which later included Tommy Flowers. They constructed a machine to do this that was dubbed Heath Robinson after the cartoonist who designed fantastical machines. The series of Robinson machines were forerunners of the ten Colossus machines, the world's first programmable digital electronic computers.

== Postwar ==
Returning to Imperial College after the war, Wynn-Williams devoted himself largely to the development of practical undergraduate teaching, where he was an accomplished and much liked instructor. He became lecturer and ultimately reader in physics at Imperial. In 1957 he received the Physical Society's Duddell medal in recognition of his work on the scale-of-two counter.

Like most who worked at Bletchley Park, Wynn-Williams did not receive official recognition for his wartime work, and he always observed the oath of secrecy surrounding it, although he retained an interest in codes and puzzles throughout his life. Professor R. V. Jones, UK Government Scientific Intelligence advisor in the second World War, wrote in Nature in 1981:

... the modern computer is only possible because of an invention made by a physicist, C. E.Wynn-Williams, in 1932 for counting nuclear particles: the scale-of-two counter, which may prove to be one of the most influential of all inventions.

On his retirement in 1970 Wynn-Williams and his wife moved to Dôl-y-Bont, near Borth, in Cardiganshire.

== Bibliography ==
- Budiansky, Stephen (2000), Battle of wits: The Complete Story of Codebreaking in World War II, Free Press, pp. 234–235, 241, 360, ISBN 978-0-684-85932-3
- Copeland, Jack (2004), "Enigma", in Copeland, B. Jack (ed.), The Essential Turing: Seminal Writings in Computing, Logic, Philosophy, Artificial Intelligence, and Artificial Life plus The Secrets of Enigma, Oxford: Oxford University Press, p. 208, ISBN 978-0-19-825080-7
- Copeland, B. Jack, ed. (2006). Colossus: The Secrets of Bletchley Park's Codebreaking Computers. Oxford: Oxford University Press. pp. 64, 65, 69, 72, 145–147, 299. ISBN 978-0-19-284055-4.
- Good, Jack (1993), "Enigma and Fish", in Hinsley, F.H.; Stripp, Alan (eds.), Codebreakers: The inside story of Bletchley Park, Oxford: Oxford University Press, p. 162, ISBN 978-0-19-280132-6
- Hodges, Andrew (1992), Alan Turing: The Enigma, London: Vintage, pp. 225–226, 262n, 267, ISBN 978-0-09-911641-7
- Hughes, Jeffrey A. (2004). "Oxford Dictionary of National Biography: Williams, Charles Eryl Wynn- (1903–1979)". Oxford Dictionary of National Biography (online ed.). Oxford University Press. doi:10.1093/ref:odnb/52479. (Subscription, Wikipedia Library access or UK public library membership required.)
- Jones, L H (21 September 2010), Firm's vital role in Enigma project is revealed at last
- Jones, R. V. (3 September 1981), "British Association 1831—1981: Some consequences of Physics", Nature, 293 (5827): 23–25, Bibcode:1981Natur.293...23J, doi:10.1038/293023a0, S2CID 118583316
- McKay, Sinclair (2010), The Secret life of Bletchley Park, London: Arum Press, pp. 261, 267, ISBN 978-1-84513-539-3
- Randell, Brian (1980), "The Colossus", A History of Computing in the Twentieth Century (PDF), archived from the original (PDF) on 22 July 2011
- Rutherford, Ernest; Wynn-Williams, C. E.; Lewis, W. B. (October 1931), "Analysis of the α-Particles Emitted from Thorium C and Actinium C", Proceedings of the Royal Society A, 133 (822): 351–366, Bibcode:1931RSPSA.133..351R, doi:10.1098/rspa.1931.0155
- Sale, Tony, The Colossus its purpose and operation: The machine age comes to Fish code breaking
- Turing, Alan M. (December 1942), Visit to National Cash Register Corporation of Dayton, Ohio (PDF), archived from the original (PDF) on 16 November 2010
- Ward, F. A. B. (3 January 1980), "Obituary: C. E. Wynn-Williams", Nature, 283 (5742): 117–118, Bibcode:1980Natur.283..117W, doi:10.1038/283117b0
- Welchman, Gordon (1984) [1982], The Hut Six story: Breaking the Enigma codes, Harmondsworth, England: Penguin Books, pp. 177–178, ISBN 0-14-005305-0
- Wynn-Williams, C. E. (2 July 1931), "The Use of Thyratrons for High Speed Automatic Counting of Physical Phenomena", Proceedings of the Royal Society A, 132 (819): 295–310, Bibcode:1931RSPSA.132..295W, doi:10.1098/rspa.1931.0102
- Wynn-Williams, C. E. (2 May 1932), "A Thyratron "Scale of Two" Automatic counter", Proceedings of the Royal Society A, 136 (829): 312–324, Bibcode:1932RSPSA.136..312W, doi:10.1098/rspa.1932.0083, JSTOR 95771
- Wynn-Williams, C E (1957), "The Scale-of-Two Counter", Physical Society Yearbook: 53–60
