= Dôl-y-bont =

Village in Ceredigion, Wales

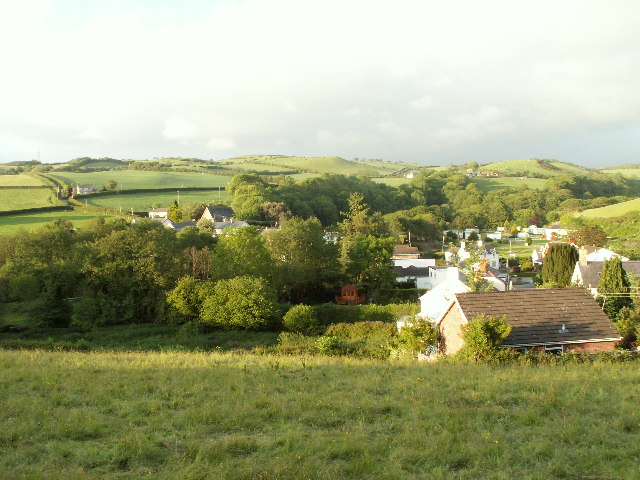
View of Dol-y-bont, Ceredigion

Dol-y-bont ("bridge meadow") is a village in Ceredigion, Wales; It lies near Borth, to the north of Llandre. Dôl is Welsh for "meadow", Pont is Welsh for "bridge".

The village was the birthplace of Welsh bard and scholar Dewi Teifi (1877–1971), and the retirement location of British physicist C. E. Wynn-Williams (1903–1979).

The area experienced extensive flooding in June 2012.

| Location | Locality | Coordinates (links to map & photo sources) | OS grid reference |
|---|---|---|---|
| Dôl-y-Bont | Ceredigion | 52.4729°N 04.0273°W | SN6288 |
