= Tom Macdonald (writer) =

Welsh journalist and novelist (1900–1980)

- Born: Thomas Macdonald; 22 November 1900; Llanfihangel Genau'r Glyn, Cardiganshire, Wales
- Died: 9 February 1980 (aged 79) 'Y Nyth', Capel Bangor, Dyfed, Wales
- Education: Rhydypennau Board School; Ardwyn Grammar School; University College of Wales, Aberystwyth
- Occupations: Journalist; novelist
- Spouse: Minnie Eileen Dainow (1904–1996)
- Children: Michael Macdonald (adopted, died in infancy); Gillian Macdonald (adopted) and Robin Macdonald (adopted)
- Parent(s): John Macdonald (1860–1938) and Ada Jones (1878–1946)

Tom Macdonald (22 November 1900 – 9 February 1980) was a Welsh journalist and novelist, whose most significant publication was his highly evocative account of growing up in the north of Cardiganshire (now Ceredigion) in the years before the Great War, which was published in 1975 as The White Lanes of Summer.

== Biography ==
Thomas Macdonald was born on 22 November 1900 at Llanfihangel Genau'r Glyn in Cardiganshire, the son of John Macdonald (1860–1938), a tinker of Irish descent, and his second wife Ada Jones (1878–1946). He spent his early childhood in a small cottage in the village, before moving with his family first to Pen-y-garn and then going on to live in nearby Bow Street. According to his father, the family name was actually MacDonnell, but had been inadvertently changed to Macdonald by the local registrar of births and deaths.

Although his background was Catholic, he was deeply influenced by the Welsh Calvinistic Methodism of the community in which he lived.

Tom Macdonald was initially educated at Rhydypennau Board School and then at Ardwyn Grammar School in Aberystwyth, before going on to study at the University College of Wales, Aberystwyth., but, before he could graduate, his mentor died. He then embarked on a forty-year career as a newspaper journalist, first at the Cambrian News, Aberystwyth, then the Western Mail and the Daily Express. He later worked in China and Australia, before returning to Wales during the Great Depression. In 1939, he and wife, Eileen, travelled to South Africa where he eventually became chief reporter and news editor at the Sunday Times in Johannesburg, South Africa, because childhood illnesses prevented him from joining up to take part in the Second World War.

Tom Macdonald's first book was entitled Henry and Songs of Nature (1920), and was written in memory of his younger brother who died aged seven in 1913. He later went on to publish six novels in English: Gareth the Ploughman (1939), The Peak (1941), Gate of Gold (1946), The Black Rabbit (1948), How Soon Hath Time (1950), and The Song of the Valley (1951) all set in Wales; together with two works dealing with South African current affairs and recent history: Ouma Smuts: The First Lady of South Africa (1946), Jan Hofmeyr: Heir to Smuts (1948), and The Transvaal Story, the last a compilation of articles written about his travels around the province and characters he had met (1961). He also wrote a number of short stories, which were published in several English language magazines, especially in Argosy.

His memoirs, written over a number of years while he was in South Africa, were first published in a Welsh translation with the title Y Tincer Tlawd (1971), before being finally published in English as The White Lanes of Summer (1975). He later claimed that this was "nearer to my heart than anything I have written". He went on to publish two other non-fiction works, one in English: Where Silver Salmon Leap (1976), and the other translated into Welsh: Gwanwyn Serch (1982), which contained more memories of his childhood and was a sequel to Y Tincer Tlawd. A further novel was published in Welsh with the title Y Nos Na Fu (1974), while his first English novel was also translated into Welsh as Croesi’r Bryniau (1980).

In 1962, Macdonald initially retired to the South Coast [Natal, South Africa], but spurred by ill health and hiraeth (nostalgia - Welsh), finally returned to Bow Street, Ceredigion, in 1965, briefly living at Plas Cwmcynfelyn before settling at ‘Y Nyth’ in Capel Bangor. He died at his home on 9 February 1980 aged 79 years.

== Bibliography ==
- Macdonald, Tom (1975). The White Lanes of Summer. Macmillan, London. ISBN 0-333-17975-7
