= Tirymynach =

Community in Ceredigion, Wales

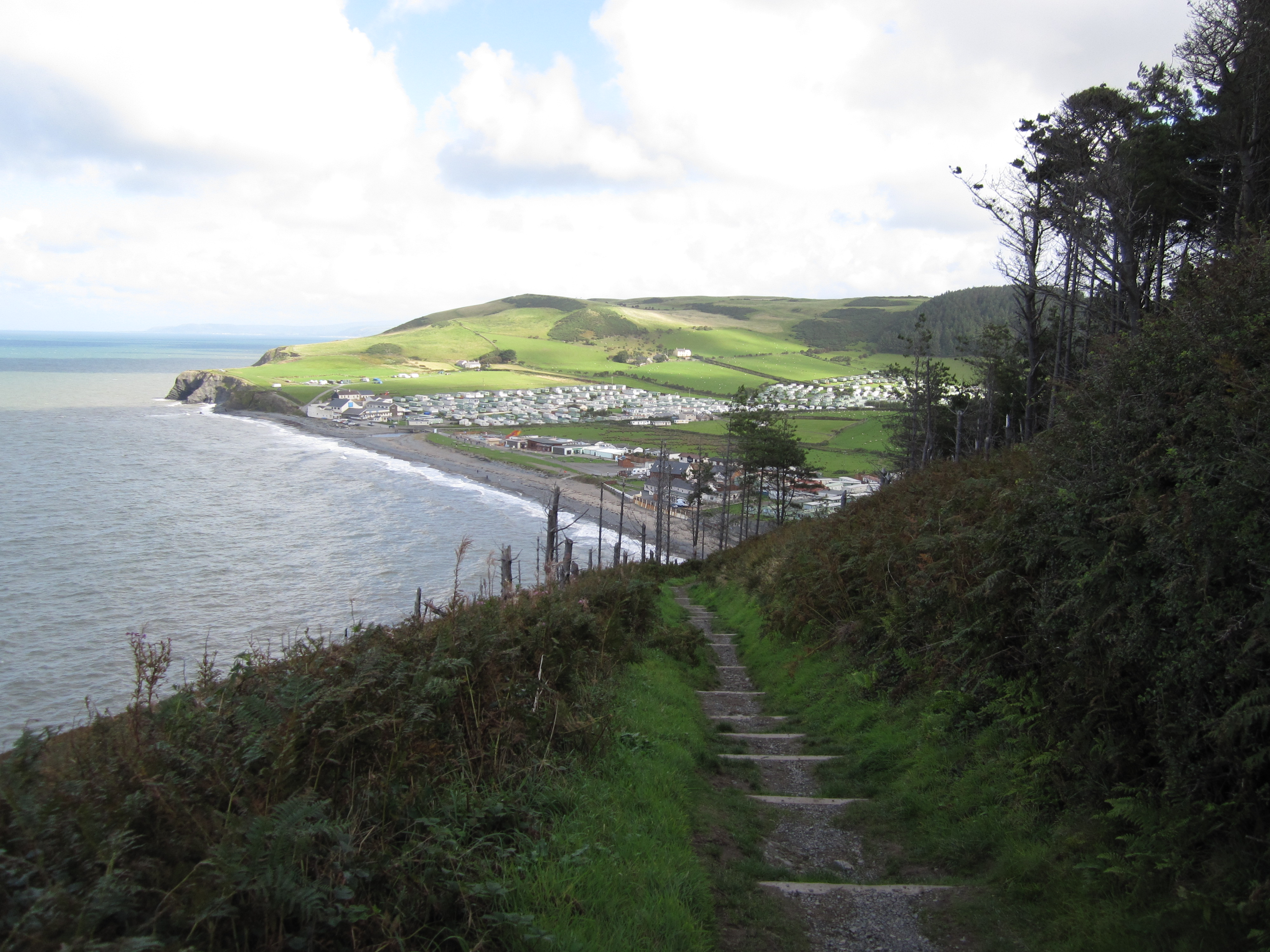

- Location within Ceredigion
- Area: 14.53 km^{2} (5.61 sq mi)
- Population: 1,901 (2011)
  - Density: 131/km^{2} (340/sq mi)
- OS grid reference: SN 616 850
  - Cardiff: 76.4 mi (123.0 km)
  - London: 179 mi (288 km)
- Community: Tirymynach
- Principal area: Ceredigion
- Country: Wales
- Sovereign state: United Kingdom
- Post town: Aberystwyth
- Postcode district: SY23
- Post town: Bow Street
- Postcode district: SY24
- Police: Dyfed-Powys
- Fire: Mid and West Wales
- Ambulance: Welsh
- UK Parliament: Ceredigion Preseli
- Senedd Cymru – Welsh Parliament: Ceredigion Penfro
- List of places UK Wales Ceredigion 52.445°N 4.037°W Community map: Map of the community

Tirymynach (Welsh pronunciation: [ˌtir ə ˈmənaχ]) is a community in Ceredigion, Wales, also an electoral ward, which lies immediately to the north of Aberystwyth.

== Surroundings ==
This community includes the villages of Bow Street, Clarach, Dole, Llangorwen, and Pen-y-garn. The area of the community is roughly 15 square km.

== Governance ==
Tirymynach is represented in the Senedd by Elin Jones (Plaid Cymru) and the Member of Parliament is Ben Lake (Plaid Cymru).

== See also ==
- List of localities in Wales by population
