= Rhydypennau, Ceredigion =

Village in Ceredigion, Wales

Coordinates: 52.453889°N 4.019722°W

Rhydypennau
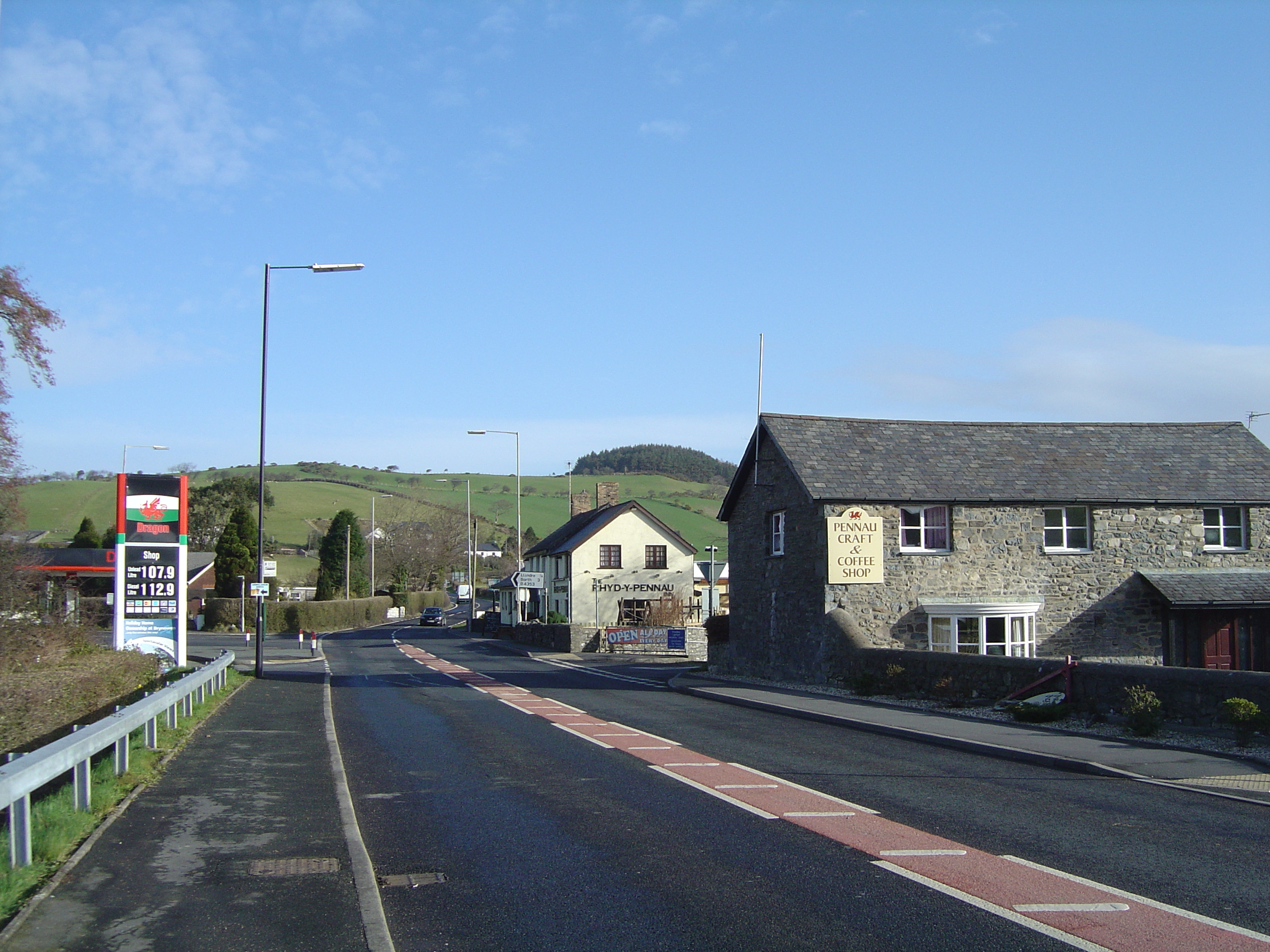
- Rhydypennau, taken from Rhiw Baker looking north towards Tal-y-bont

- Location within Ceredigion
- Population: 2,258
- OS grid reference: SN6285
- Principal area: Ceredigion
- Preserved county: Dyfed
- Country: Wales
- Sovereign state: United Kingdom
- Post town: BOW STREET
- Postcode district: SY24
- Dialling code: 01970
- Police: Dyfed-Powys
- Fire: Mid and West Wales
- Ambulance: Welsh
- UK Parliament: Ceredigion Preseli
- Senedd Cymru – Welsh Parliament: Ceredigion Penfro

Rhydypennau is a hamlet in the Genau'r-glyn district of Ceredigion, Wales, approximately 4 1/2 miles (7.2 km) north-east of Aberystwyth. Along with the village of Pen-y-garn, Rhydypennau is now often considered to be part of the neighbouring village of Bow Street. All three places stretch in a long narrow strip along the main Aberystwyth to Machynlleth road (A487).

== Toponymy ==
In his memoirs about growing up in Llanfihangel Geneu’r Glyn (Llandre), Pen-y-garn and Bow Street, Tom Macdonald (1900–80) recalls that the local pronunciation of Rhydypennau was ‘Rhypenne’.

== Archaeology ==
An early Bronze-age copper thin-butted flat axe was found to the north-east of Rhydypennau Bridge. The axe has one smooth face, which is slightly hammered along its edges, whilst the other is irregular and shows traces of tooling.

== Services ==
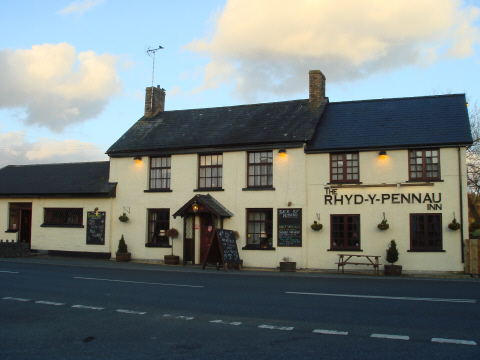
Rhyd-y-Pennau Inn

Rhydypennau is centred on the junction of the A487 with the road towards Llandre and Borth. As well as a few houses, there is the Rhyd-y-Pennau Inn, Rhydypennau Garage, the Pennau craft centre, and Rhydypennau Farm.

The old Rhydypennau School (which was closed in the late 1990s) overlooks the hamlet, whilst the present Rhydypennau school, Ysgol Rhydypennau, is located in Pen-y-garn. Bow Street Football Club's ground, Cae Piod, is also at Rhydypennau.

== Notable residents ==
- T. Ifor Rees (1890–1977), author of travel books and ambassador
