= John Rees (musician) =

Welsh musician and composer

John Thomas Rees

John Thomas Rees (14 November 1857 – 14 October 1949) was a Welsh musician and composer who was notable for winning a prize at the National Eisteddfod in 1895.

John Thomas Rees was born 14 November 1857 at Llwynbedw. The son of Thomas and Hannah (née Morgan) Rees, he began working as a mine pit boy at age nine. During the time he worked in the mines, Rees studied the Tonic-Solfa system, earning an advanced certificate. Rees also taught music while he was a colliery worker; one of his pupils was Daniel Protheroe.

Rees worked in the mines until the age of twenty-one; at that time, he gained some notability as the composer of a cantata he entered into a Treherbert eisteddfod competition. A small fund was established by Rees' friends for his studies at Aberystwyth with Joseph Parry. When these funds ran low, Rees was faced with the possibility of leaving the university until David Jenkins arranged for him to teach Solfa classes in Pen-y-garn. Rees travelled to Emporia, Kansas in 1882; he then entered the University of Toronto, where he received a Bachelor of Music degree in 1889. Rees later held a teaching position at the university while he again visited North America.

Rees settled in Pen-y-Garn; he married Elizabeth Davies there in 1881. (Note: The couple had eight children; Elizabeth Rees died in 1939.) He taught adult music classes, conducted local choirs, was a part-time music teacher in nearby Tregaron and a part-time lecturer at University of Wales, Aberystwyth. While teaching at Pen-y-garn, Rees continued composing. His composition for string quartet won the top prize at the national eisteddfod at Aberdare, with the judges declaring it to be the best composition ever submitted there. He again won first prize at a national competition for the best musical arrangement of a Psalm for orchestra, soli and chorus. Rees also edited various collections of hymns and songs. He died on 14 October 1949, aged 81.

== Works ==
- Duw sydd noddfa
- Y Teulu Dedwydd
- Crist yr Andes
- Hosannah
- Christos
- String Quartet
- Y Trwbadŵ
- Hillsides of Wales
