= Dole, Ceredigion =

Village in Ceredigion, Wales

Coordinates: 52.457007°N 4.009739°W

Dole
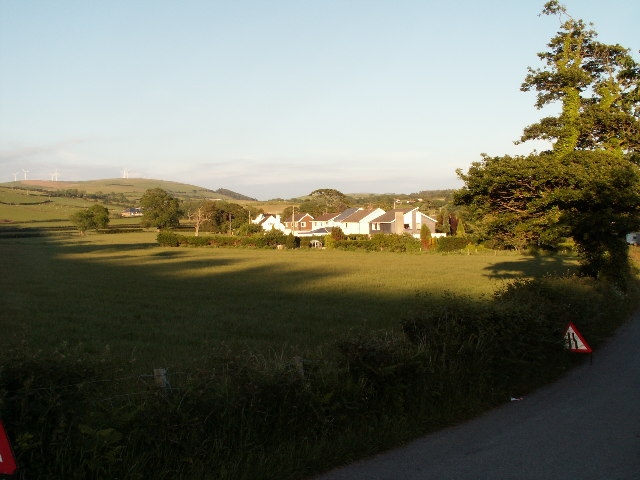
- Houses on the edge of the village

- Location within Ceredigion
- OS grid reference: SN 6354 8624
  - Cardiff: 76.3 mi (122.8 km)
  - London: 177.7 mi (286.0 km)
- Community: Tirymynach
- Principal area: Ceredigion
- Country: Wales
- Sovereign state: United Kingdom
- Post town: Borth
- Postcode district: SY24
- Police: Dyfed-Powys
- Fire: Mid and West Wales
- Ambulance: Welsh
- UK Parliament: Ceredigion Preseli
- Senedd Cymru – Welsh Parliament: Ceredigion

Dole is a small village in the community of Tirymynach, Ceredigion, Wales. Dole is represented in the Senedd by Elin Jones (Plaid Cymru) and the Member of Parliament is Ben Lake (Plaid Cymru). It was the home of Baron Elystan Morgan of Aberteifi until his death on 7 July 2021.

== See also ==
- List of localities in Wales by population
