= Llandre =

Village in Ceredigion, Wales

Llandre: Welsh: Llanfihangel Genau'r Glyn
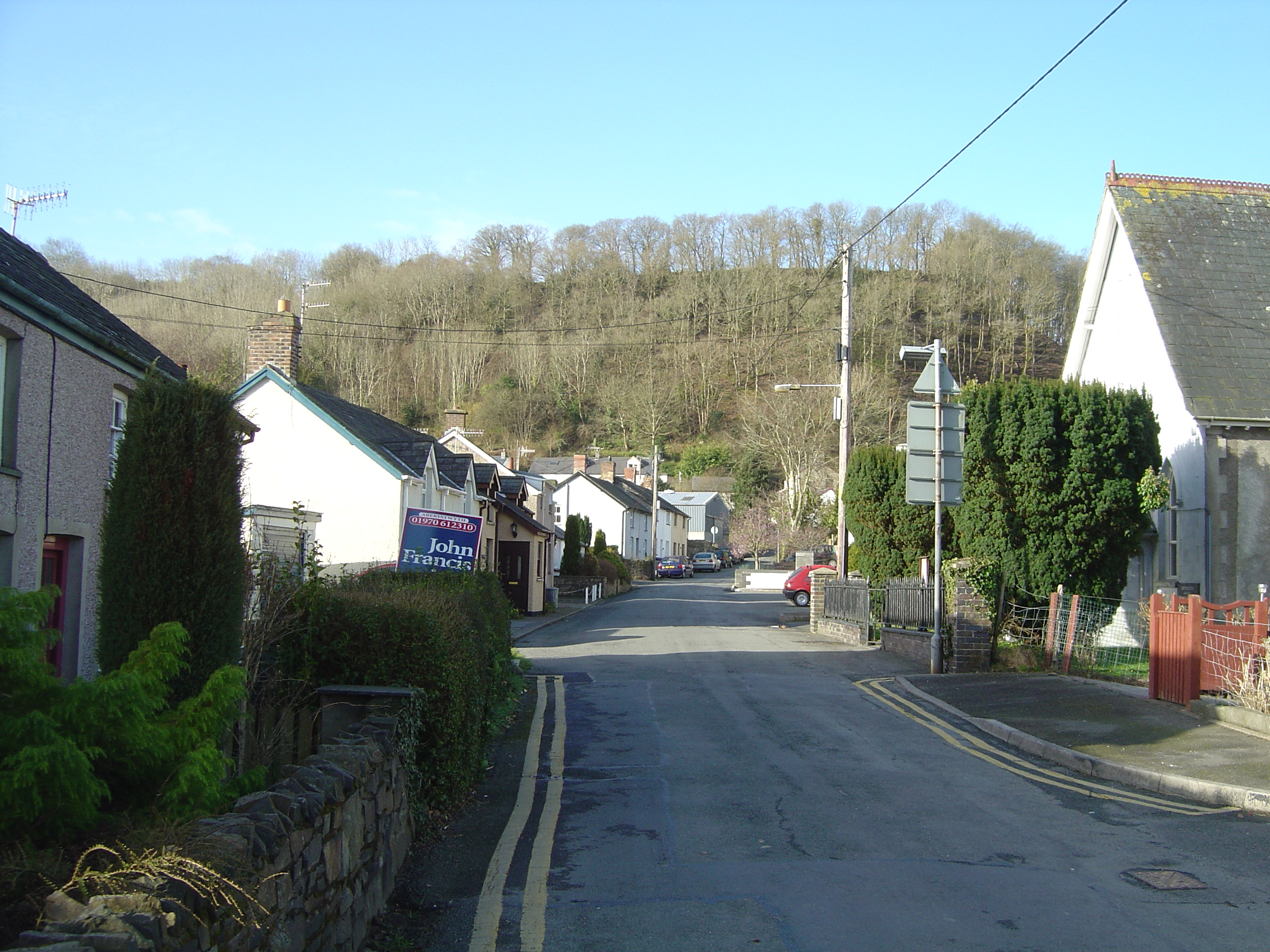

- Location within Ceredigion
- Population: 679 (2011)
- OS grid reference: SN625869
- Principal area: Ceredigion
- Preserved county: Dyfed
- Country: Wales
- Sovereign state: United Kingdom
- Post town: BOW STREET
- Postcode district: SY24
- Dialling code: 01970
- Police: Dyfed-Powys
- Fire: Mid and West Wales
- Ambulance: Welsh
- UK Parliament: Ceredigion Preseli
- Senedd Cymru – Welsh Parliament: Ceredigion Penfro
- List of places UK Wales Ceredigion 52.464°N 4.023°W Community map: Map of the Geneu'r Glyn community

Llandre (Welsh pronunciation: [ˈɬandrɛ]), or Llanfihangel Genau'r Glyn, is a village in Ceredigion, Wales. It lies 5 miles north of Aberystwyth in the north-west of the county, on the road from Rhydypennau to Borth. To the north of the community lies the village of Dôl-y-bont. The community is called Geneu'r Glyn.

== Toponymy ==
The traditional placename of the village was Llanfihangel Genau'r Glyn (English: St Michaels at the Mouth of the Valley), which derives from its location in the old cwmwd of Genau'r Glyn, part of the cantref of Penweddig. Before that, the name was Llanfihangel Castell Gwallter. The name changed to Llanfihangel Genau'r Glyn in the 16th century. When the railway station opened in 1864 the nameboards read simply "Llanfihangel", but in 1916, at the request of Cynnull Mawr Parish Council "as Llanfihangel is a very common place name in Wales and much confusion is causing considerable inconvenience", the name was changed to Llandre (English: Churchtown). The old name of Llanfihangel Genau'r Glyn still occurs frequently in books of Welsh history.

== Local sites ==
Among the antiquities of the district are Castell Gwallter (English: Walter's Castle), a motte-and-bailey castle built by the Normans in around 1110. This stood around half a mile to the west of the village. An Iron Age hill fort stood on the hill to the east of the village. St Michael's Church in the centre of the village is open every day and has useful information on the area for visitors. There is a holy well just below the lychgate and an ancient yew tree to the northeast of the church which has been estimated as being 1800 years old.

== Station ==
Llandre railway station, formerly named 'Llanfihangel', was opened on 23 June 1864 on the Cambrian Line between Machynlleth and Aberystwyth. It closed on 14 June 1965. Between 1897 and 1899 this was the interchange with the Plynlimon and Hafan Tramway.

== Notable residents ==
- Tom Macdonald (1900–1980), journalist and novelist
- Cynog Dafis (1938–present), politician and member of Plaid Cymru.
- Gwenan Jones (1889–1971), Welsh cultural historian and member of Plaid Cymru
- Wynne Melville Jones (1947–present), artist and entrepreneur
