= Plealey =

Village in Shropshire, England

Coordinates: 52.657°N 2.853°W

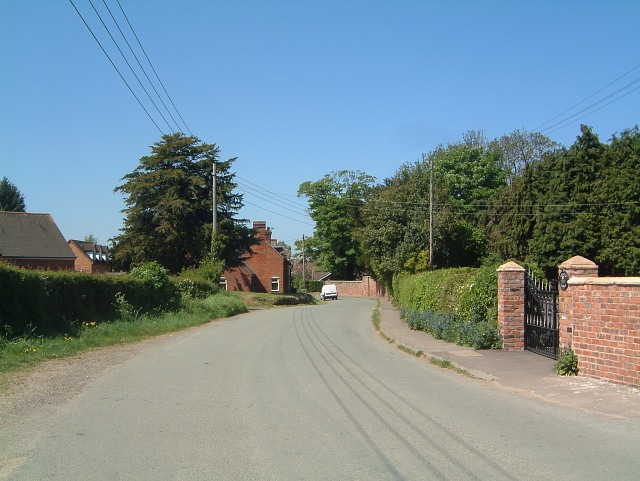
- Plealey

- Location within Shropshire
- OS grid reference: SJ423069
- Civil parish: Pontesbury
- Unitary authority: Shropshire
- Ceremonial county: Shropshire
- Region: West Midlands
- Country: England
- Sovereign state: United Kingdom
- Post town: SHREWSBURY
- Postcode district: SY5
- Dialling code: 01743
- Police: West Mercia
- Fire: Shropshire
- Ambulance: West Midlands
- UK Parliament: Shrewsbury

Plealey is a small village in Shropshire, England. It is located between Pontesford and Longden.

== Local governance ==
The village lies in the parish of Pontesbury, being represented within the Plealey Ward of its Parish Council (whose territory also includes the smaller hamlets of Little Plealey, Arscott, and Radleth, and has a population of 122 (2001 Census). In common with the rest of Pontesbury parish it is represented on the unitary Shropshire Council and in parliament in the Shrewsbury constituency.

== The village ==
Plealey was first documented in 1308 as Plealeye, in which year there were 27 tenants of the local manor resident. Now most of the village is a conservation area with 14 listed buildings, including the Methodist Chapel, and houses "Brookgate" (oldest parts 15th century) and "The Den" (17th century, built as a "worker's hovel").

Another house, Galliers Farm, was occupied as a summer residence by mathematician Edward Waring from about 1788 until his death in 1798. His family owned 215 acres of local land in 1797. His successor in residence, Richard France, believed to have added its three bay frontage, built the local Methodist Chapel.

A now-disused smithy has stood on its present site since 1698, and from 1797 to as late as 1968 was in continuous occupation of a Bromley family.

There is a post box and a Methodist Chapel. On Bank Holiday Saturday in August a street market is held, an unusual event for such a small village.

== Plealey Methodist Chapel ==
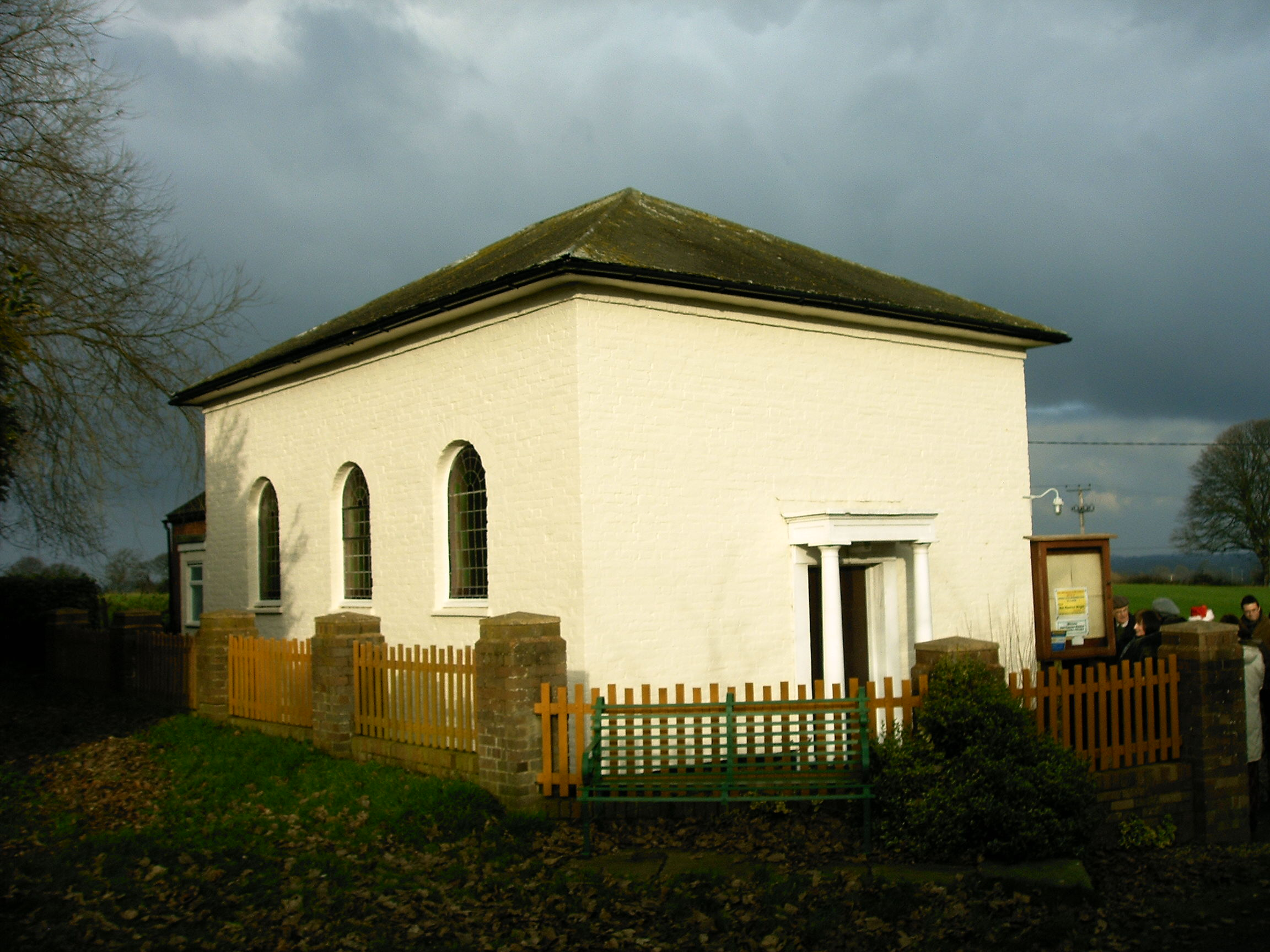
Plealey Methodist Chapel, front view

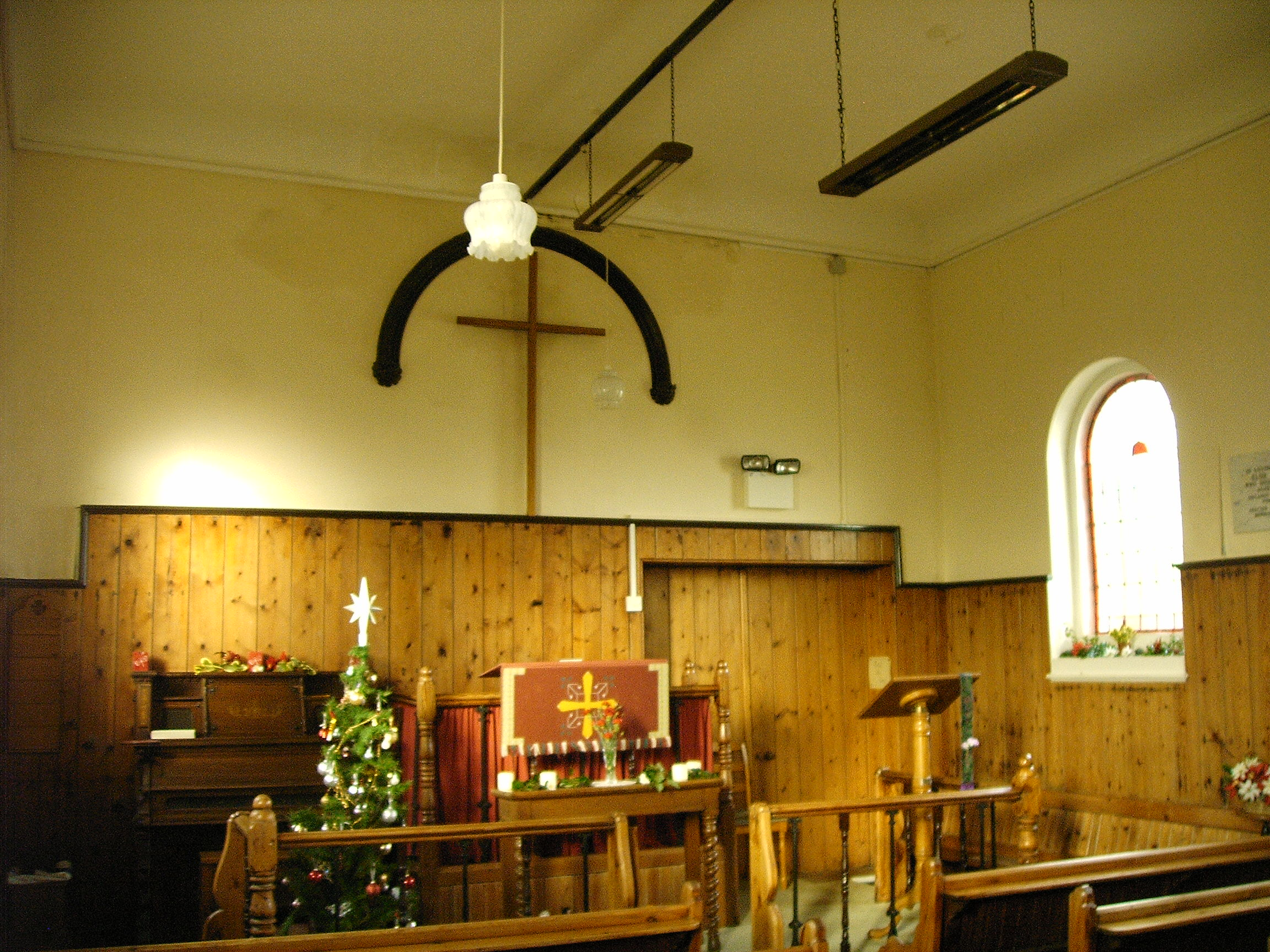
Plealey Methodist Chapel, interior (decorated for Christmas).

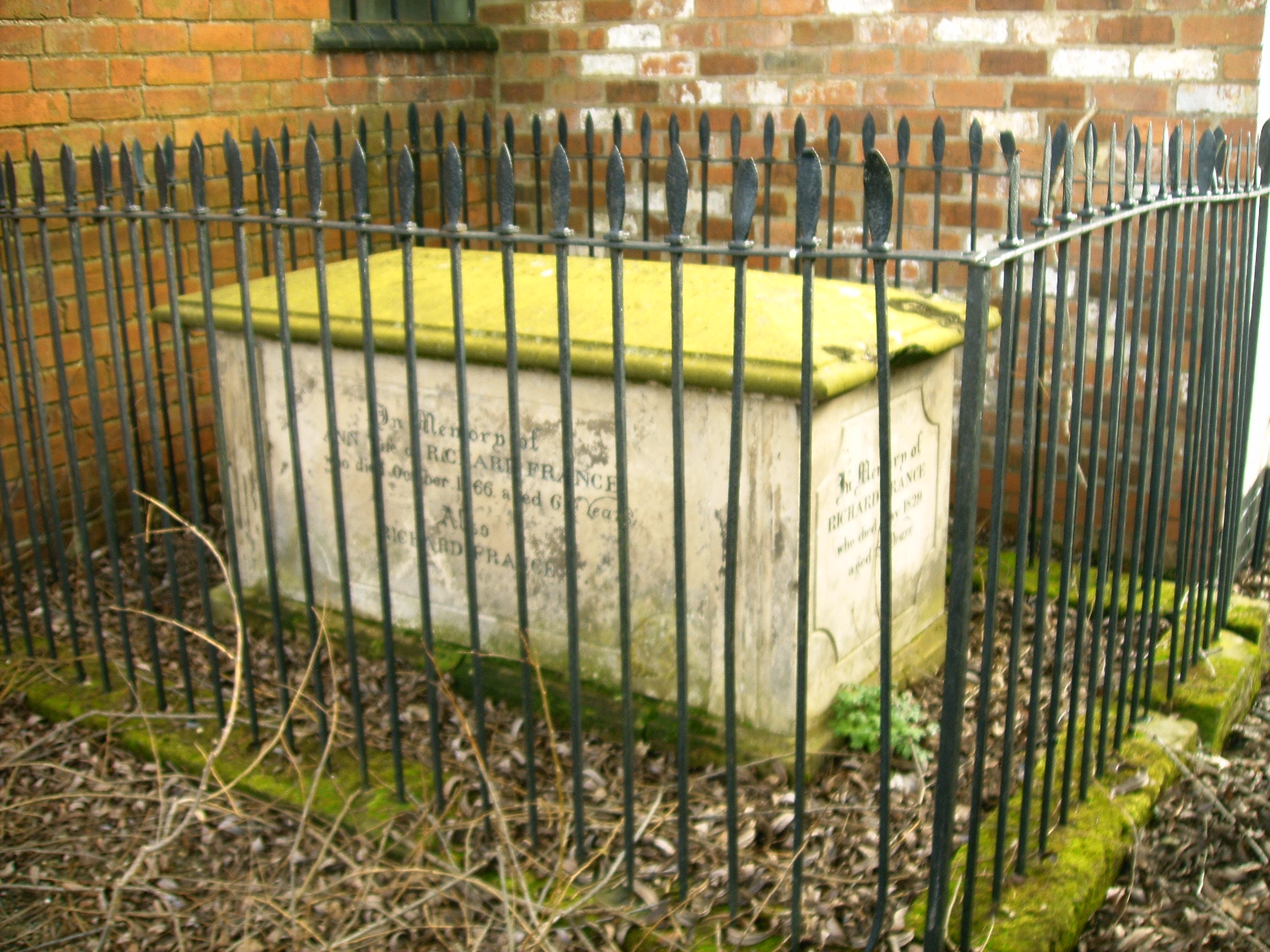
Tomb of Ann and Richard France at Plealey Methodist Chapel.

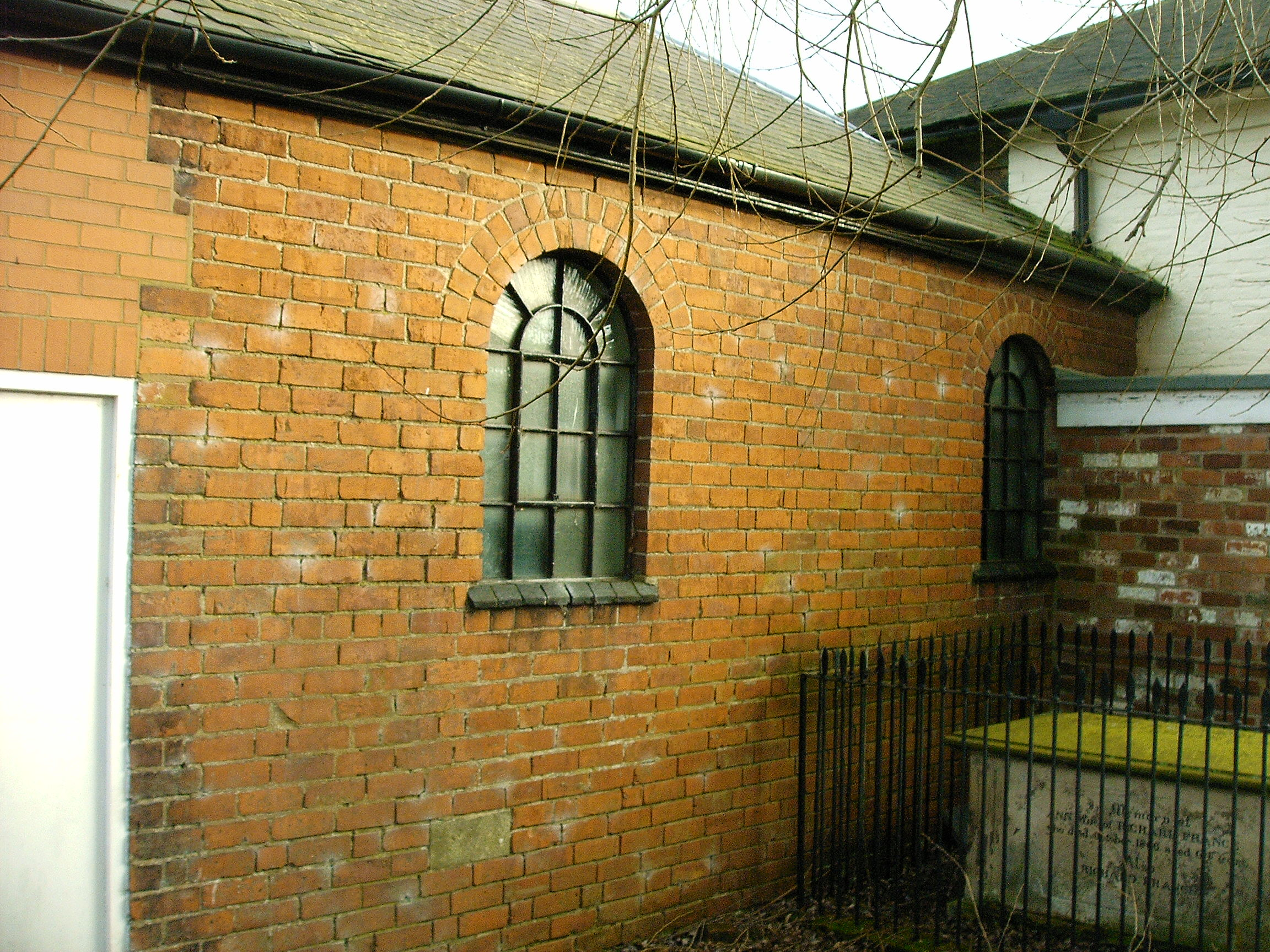
Plealey Methodist Chapel, rear view, showing location of tomb of Richard France, and later additions to the building.

=== History ===
The Methodist Chapel at Plealey is interesting in that it was built by Richard France, a resident of the village. Richard France, in 1825, and Edward Owen, in 1826, had licensed their houses as "dissenting meeting houses". By 1828, Richard France decided to build a chapel, and bought a piece of land opposite his house. He bought for five shillings, "the parcel of land known as Corfield's Yard" for the purpose of erecting a chapel "for the use of Preachers of the Methodist Conference as established by the late John Wesley". It was, however, originally licensed as a Congregational Chapel.

The practice of an individual building a chapel is not unique. For example, in 1801, John Lomas of Hollinsclough built a Methodist chapel in his garden. This chapel is still in use and a key part of village life.

In the 1830s, Richard France (who still owned the chapel) had arranged for the chapel to be used by the Baptists. It was finally handed over to the Wesleyan Methodists in 1851. The 1851 Religious Census records that 50 people attended morning services there.

In later years, some additions were made to the structure, to provide for toilets and a kitchen. The different brickwork on the photo of the rear of the building shows this. The outside of the main chapel is now painted white, and is of the same brick as the "Sunday School" at the rear. Modern brick gives away the later extensions. The porch also appears to be a later addition, not matching the simplicity of the original architecture, and having two layers of flashing over the join to the building.

=== Architectural riddle ===
This history answers the architectural riddle of a 19th-century Methodist chapel with no inscription, unless one is hidden by the porch. The style is more typical of Primitive Methodists, but the building was assigned to the Wesleyans. When the chapel was built, it was normal Methodist practice to display both the date and the branch of Methodism. The plain style, almost square plan, with no inscription, is explained if Richard France built it as a Congregational chapel. However, this description would have allowed France the freedom to invite those preachers of whom he approved, Methodist, Baptist or Independent. There is no doubt as to his non-conformist Christian conviction. The attendance in 1951 shows that a substantial number in the village were non-conformists. It is possible that a factor in his decision was the greater respectability of the Wesleyans coupled with their being the most capable to maintain the building as a place of worship.

=== Present day ===
The chapel is now a private residence and no longer used for religious purposes.

== See also ==
- Listed buildings in Pontesbury
