= Poles Coppice countryside site =

Woodland in Shropshire, England

Coordinates: 52°38′10″N 2°54′00″W

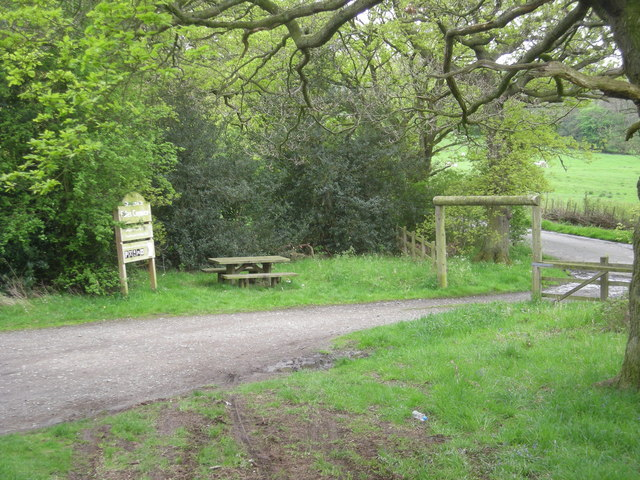
Entrance to Poles Coppice in Shropshire

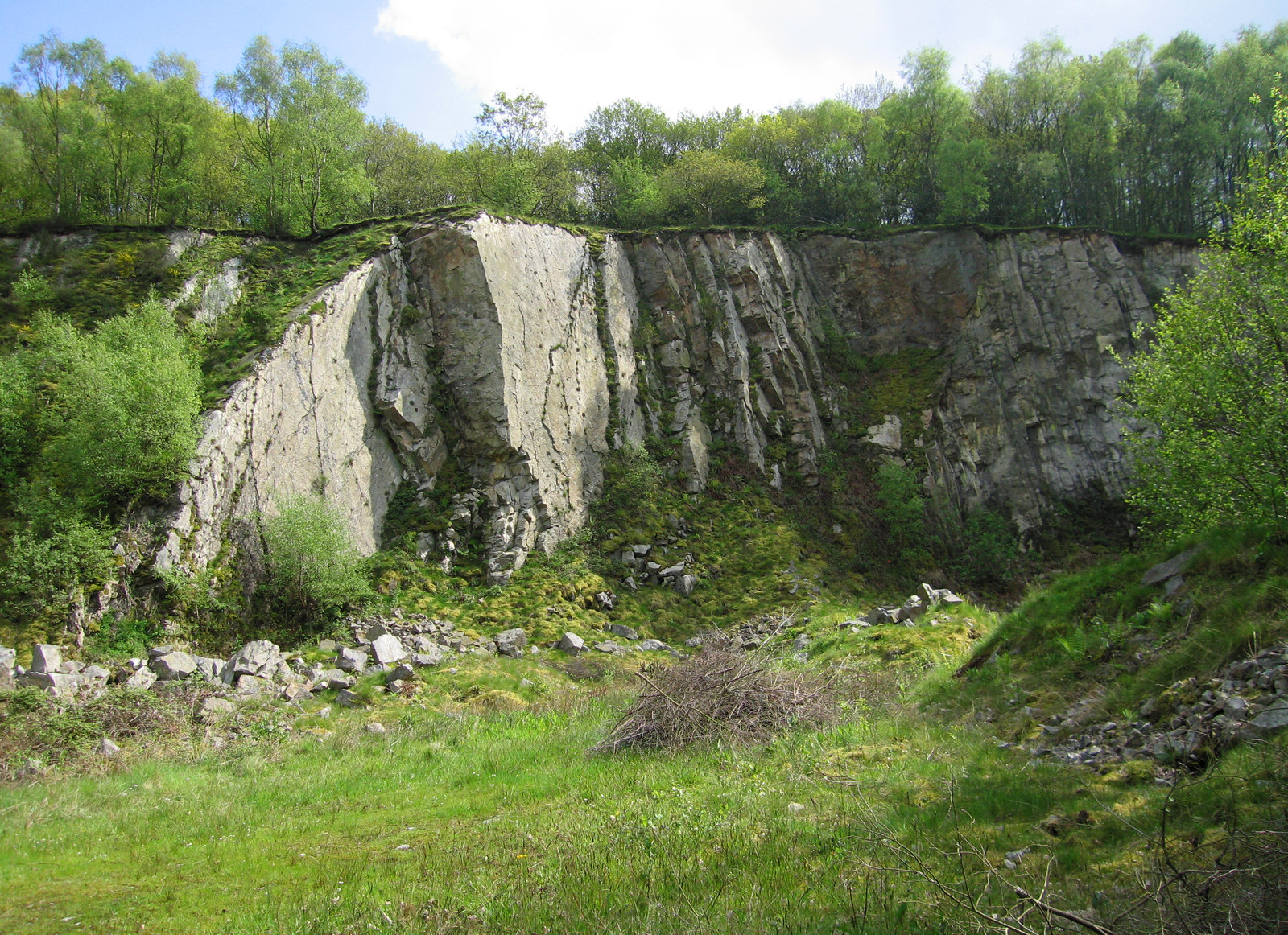
One of two disused quarries on the site

Poles Coppice countryside site is an area of ancient oak woodland with disused quarry workings, located around 0.5 miles (1 km) south of Pontesbury, Shropshire. It is managed by Shropshire Council as a picnic spot and area for walking and recreation activities.

== Location and wildlife ==
Extending to around 30 hectares (74 acres) at the northern end of the Stiperstones ridge, Poles Coppice consists of two historic hard rock quarries and ancient woodland. It has acid grassland and marshy areas within the quarries and further areas of wet woodland, which help to support a range of protected species, including bats, badgers and peregrine falcon. Further species recorded at the site in a Natural England survey include polecat, grayling butterfly and spotted flycatcher. Common spotted orchid has been found in the main quarry and other notable woodland plants in the area include bluebell, soft shield fern and a wide range of bryophytes.

== Management ==
The area is managed by Shropshire Council which aims to conserve the woodland as a habitat for bats and breeding birds, and to also improve the quarry areas to support notable flora and fauna. Other targets include improving the visibility of the geological aspects of the site around the quarry. Circular walks are present on site, and currently offer views of Pontesbury and the Rea Valley.

Wildlife work at Poles Coppice has been planned by the Countryside Service, and includes clearing geologically significant rock faces to improve conditions for ground flora and, potentially, adder populations.
