= Habberley =

Habberley may refer to:

- Habberley, Shropshire, England
- Habberley, Worcestershire, England
