= Shorthill, Shropshire =

Village in Shropshire, England

Coordinates: 52.669°N 2.850°W

Shorthill
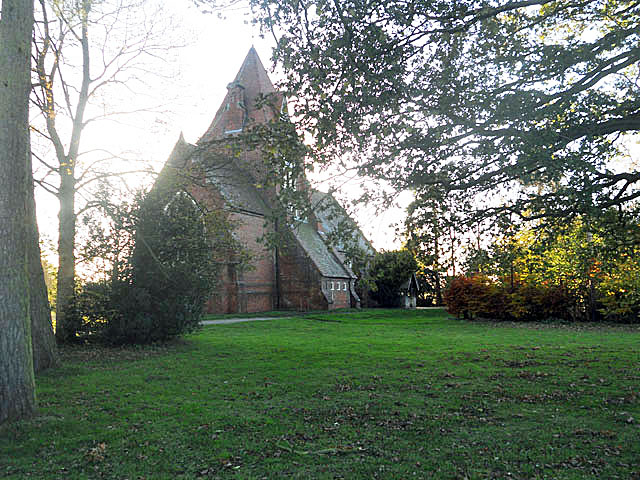
- Lea Cross church, Shorthill

- Location within Shropshire
- OS grid reference: SJ425082
- Civil parish: Pontesbury
- Unitary authority: Shropshire
- Ceremonial county: Shropshire
- Region: West Midlands
- Country: England
- Sovereign state: United Kingdom
- Post town: SHREWSBURY
- Postcode district: SY5
- Dialling code: 01743
- Police: West Mercia
- Fire: Shropshire
- Ambulance: West Midlands
- UK Parliament: Shrewsbury and Atcham

Shorthill is a small village in Shropshire, England. It is located just off the A488, near to Hanwood and Arscott, within Pontesbury civil parish. Shorthill contains a Victorian red-brick towered church, the Church of St Anne, now closed as place of worship, at Lea Cross.
