= Minsterley Motors =

Bus and coach operator based in Shropshire, England

Minsterley Motors Services Ltd

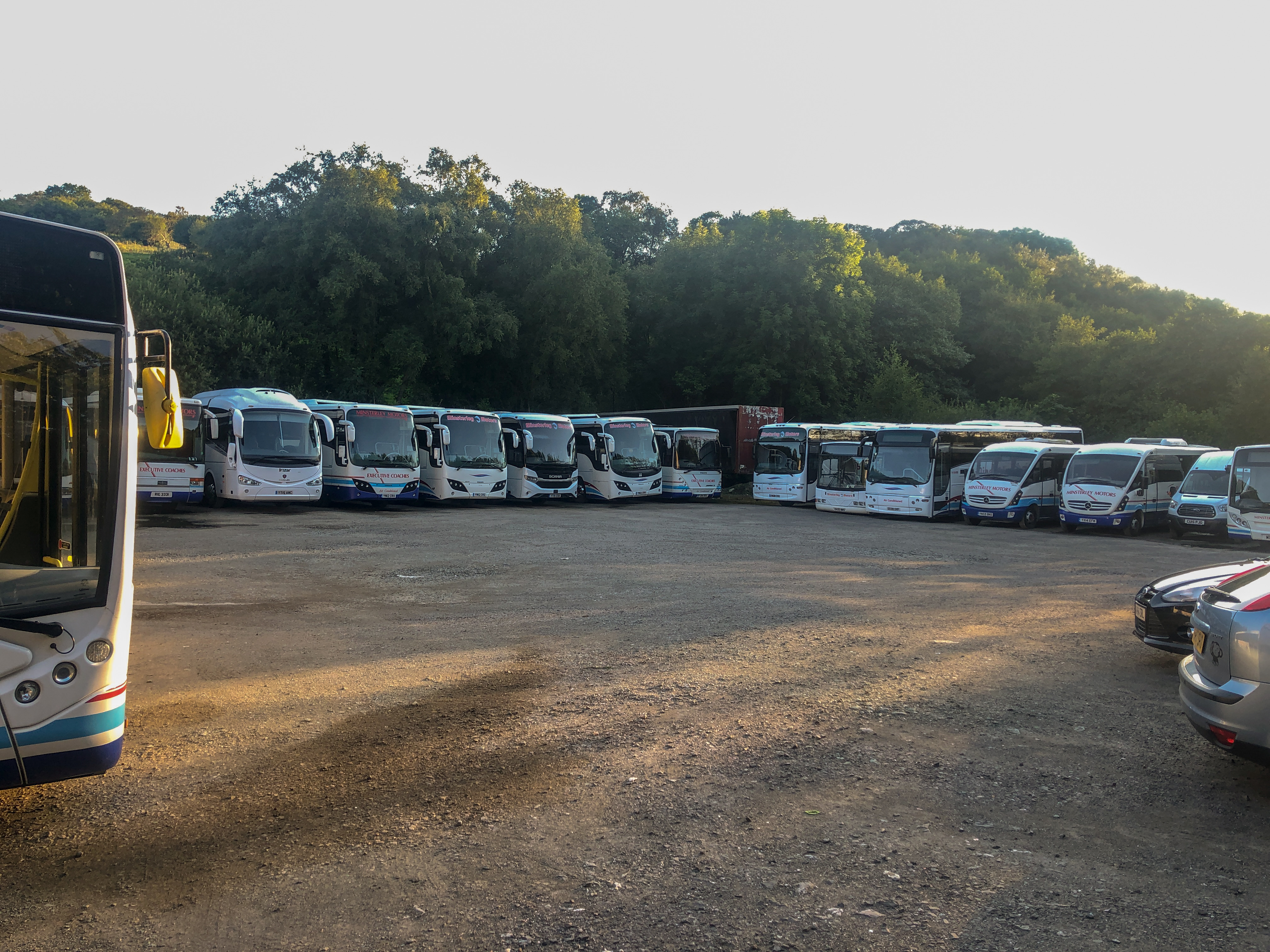
- Minsterley Motors main yard at Stiperstones, showing a variety of different vehicles from the Minsterley fleet.
- Founded: 1949; 77 years ago
- Headquarters: Annscroft, Shrewsbury
- Service area: Central and Southern Shropshire and Powys (Stage carriage operations); UK/Ireland (Coach operations)
- Service type: Bus operator Coach operator
- Routes: 8
- Destinations: Bishop’s Castle; Ludlow; Minsterley; Newtown; Plox Green; Pontesbury; Shrewsbury; Stiperstones
- Hubs: Shrewsbury; Ludlow; Bishop’s Castle
- Depots: Annscroft (Head Office); Stiperstones (Main yard); Ludlow (Stabling)
- Fleet: Optare MetroCity; Optare Solo/Solo SR; Optare Versa; ADL Enviro 200; VDL SB200
- Fuel type: Diesel
- Chief executive: John Jones (CEO); Lee Jones (COO)
- Website: www.minsterleymotors.co.uk

Minsterley Motors is a bus and coach operator in Shropshire, England.

The company's main operations concentrate on stage service and schools contract work for Shropshire Council. It also provides transport for the Shropshire Schools & Colleges Football Association.

The stage service work was concentrated on the routes 552/553 between Bishop's Castle and Shrewsbury, which was significantly improved in 2003. This was supplemented in 2007 when the company was awarded the tender to operate route 435 between Shrewsbury and Ludlow, via Church Stretton, a route which is now commercially operated. Two Plaxton Centro bodied Volvo B7RLEs joined the fleet to operate this route, and were followed by three more for routes 552/553 in May 2008.

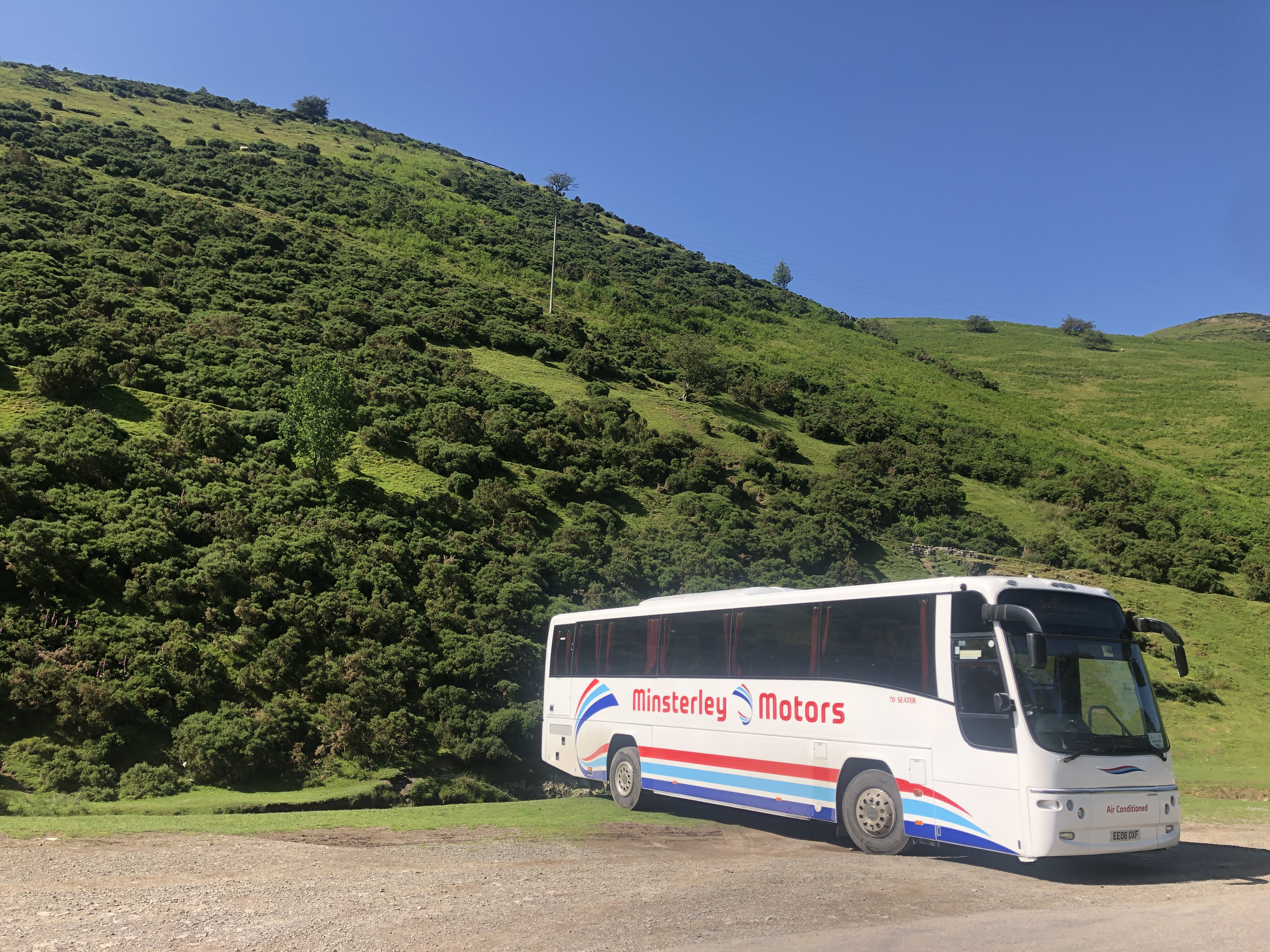
Minsterley Motors EE08OXF, a Plaxton Panther new to Oxford Bus Company, stands at the foot of the Long Mynd in Carding Mill Valley on a private hire working.

In 2012, six Wright Eclipse bodied Volvo B7RLEs were delivered to replace the Plaxton Centros on routes 435, 552 and 553. These were followed by three Plaxton Panther bodied Volvo B9Rs.

Since 27 January 2014, Minsterley Motors have operated the 701 Ludlow to East Hamlet and Sandpits using Optare Solo SRs. On 29 January 2014, they also started the 722 service which includes the Park and Ride service, to Rocksgreen and The Sheet.

As of 2022, Minsterley Motors now run the 738/740 service between Knighton, Powys, and Ludlow, this was previously run by Arriva Midlands.
