= Malehurst =

Coordinates: 52.651°N 2.912°W

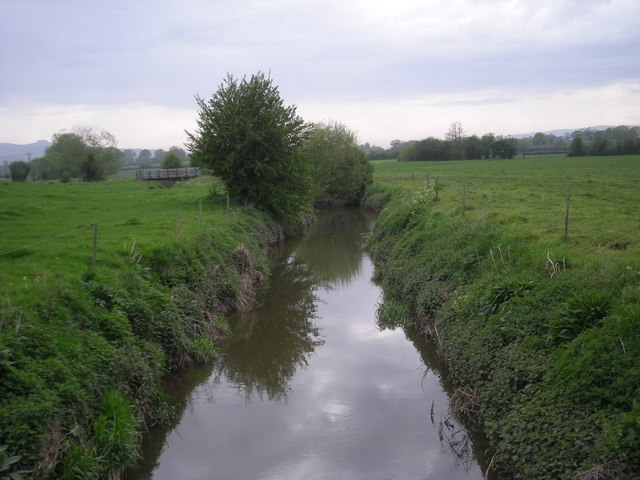
- Rea Brook near Malehurst Farm

- Location within Shropshire
- OS grid reference: SJ383063
- Civil parish: Pontesbury
- Unitary authority: Shropshire
- Ceremonial county: Shropshire
- Region: West Midlands
- Country: England
- Sovereign state: United Kingdom
- Post town: SHREWSBURY
- Postcode district: SY5
- Dialling code: 01743
- Police: West Mercia
- Fire: Shropshire
- Ambulance: West Midlands
- UK Parliament: Shrewsbury and Atcham

Malehurst is a hamlet in Shropshire, England between the large villages of Pontesbury and Minsterley and north of the small village of Asterley. It is within the civil parish of Pontesbury.

The Rea Brook flows around Malehurst and the Minsterley Brook flows into the Rea Brook here.

There is an industrial estate that accommodates a number of small businesses. There is also a highly successful dairy farm.

There was a lead smelting house at Malehurst, operated with a Boulton and Watt steam engine, between 1778 and it is going out of use by 1831. A barytes-processing plant was established at Malehurst Mill in c.1910, linked by an aerial ropeway to a mine at Huglith, until 1949 when the ropeway was taken down. The buildings became used to mill animal foodstuffs.

== See also ==
- Listed buildings in Pontesbury
