= Annscroft =

Village in Shropshire, England

Coordinates: 52.666°N 2.808°W

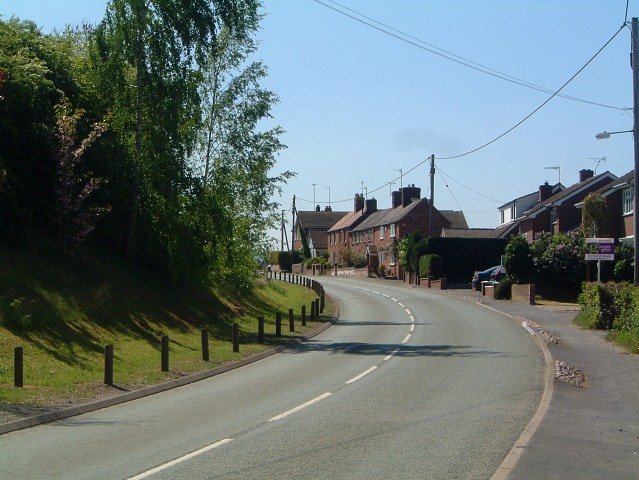
- Annscroft view to South-West

- Location within Shropshire
- OS grid reference: SJ453079
- Civil parish: Longden
- Unitary authority: Shropshire
- Ceremonial county: Shropshire
- Region: West Midlands
- Country: England
- Sovereign state: United Kingdom
- Post town: Shrewsbury
- Postcode district: SY5
- Dialling code: 01743
- Police: West Mercia
- Fire: Shropshire
- Ambulance: West Midlands
- UK Parliament: Shrewsbury and Atcham

Annscroft is a small village in Shropshire, England.

It is located on the Shrewsbury to Longden road, approximately 4 miles from Shrewsbury, with nearby hamlets Arscott and Hook-a-Gate. The village is a linear settlement, laid along the one road, and is in the civil parish of Longden. Many of the houses were 'squatter cottages' built in the 19th century to house miners working in the local collieries, which closed by 1940.

There is a church at the village's north-east end: Christ Church (C of E) was built in 1868–69, by Shrewsbury architect John Laurence Randall at a cost of £1,400, raised by subscription. It is of rubble-stone with sandstone dressings, in Early English style. The church contains three war memorials: a brass plaque on the south wall of the nave in memory of Trooper William Hulston who was killed in the Boer War of 1899-1902, a marble plaque in the chancel to 18 men who died through serving in World War I and an electric blower organ with plaque to 9 men who died as a result of World War II. The churchyard contains Commonwealth war graves of a Royal Welsh Fusiliers soldier of World War I and a Royal Air Force airman of World War II.

Half a mile north-west of the village is Moat Hall, a disguised timber-framed house built for the Berington family in about 1600, jetty underbuilt in brick. It gave its name to the Moat Hall Colliery, the largest mine in the vicinity, which was merged under one company with the colliery at Hanwood in 1921 and where coal ceased to be lifted in 1931.

The village is home to bus and coach operator Minsterley Motors, South Shropshire Hunt Kennels, Stoneyford Riding School and The Farriers Business Park.
