= Derwas Chitty =

English Anglican priest (1901–1971)

Derwas James Chitty (1901 – 1971) was an English Anglican priest and member of the Fellowship of Saint Alban and Saint Sergius. He was known as a writer on the spirituality of the Greek Orthodox tradition, as well as an archaeologist.

== Career ==
His parents were the Reverend James Charles Martin Chitty (1865–1938) and Gwen Ethlin Georgiana Chitty (née Jones; 1861–1933). Chitty's childhood was spent in the country rectory of Hanwood, Shropshire. His elder sister was Lily Chitty, who would also go on to take part in archaeology; He was educated at Winchester College where he and his brother were Scholars, and at New College, Oxford, followed by two years at the École Biblique in Jerusalem.

In 1929 he and his friend Michael Markoff excavated the Monastery of St. Euthymius in the Judaean wilderness. In 1931 he became Rector of Upton near Didcot, 15 miles from Oxford, in what was then Berkshire, where he remained until 1968. During the Second World War he was a chaplain in the Royal Navy, posted to Colombo and Bombay among other places.

== Personal life ==
During involvement in the 1929 excavations in Palestine, Chitty met his future wife Mary Kitson Clark (1905–2005); she was also an archaeologist. On 5 July 1943, they married. Together they had one child, a daughter.

After he retired from full-time ministry in 1968, they lived in Llangwnnadl, Caernarfonshire, Wales. Chitty died in 1971 after a "domestic accident".

== Works ==
He published a large number of articles and works on early Eastern Monasticism, including his magnum opus, The Desert a City.

- The Desert a City: a Study of Egyptian and Palestinian Monasticism under the Christian Empire, 1966.
- Orthodoxy and the Conversion of England: A paper read at the Conference of the Fellowship of St. Alban and St. Sergius, on 31st July, 1947
