= Listed buildings in Pontesbury =

Pontesbury is a civil parish in Shropshire, England. It contains 93 listed buildings that are recorded in the National Heritage List for England. Of these, five are listed at Grade II*, the middle of the three grades, and the others are at Grade II, the lowest grade. The parish is to the southwest of Shrewsbury. It contains a number of villages and smaller settlements, including Pontesbury, Pontesford, Plealey, Asterley, Cruckton, Cruckmeole, Arscott, Malehurst, and Habberley, and is otherwise rural. Most of the listed buildings are houses, cottages, farm houses and farm buildings, a high proportion of which are timber framed, or have timber framed cores, and the earliest of these have cruck construction. The other listed buildings include two small country houses, churches and chapels, items in the churchyards, and public houses.

== Key ==
Grade	Criteria
II*	Particularly important buildings of more than special interest
II	Buildings of national importance and special interest

== Buildings ==
Name and location	Photograph	Date	Notes	Grade
St Mary's Church, Habberley; 52.62661°N 2.88969°W		12th century	The church was restored and partly rebuilt in 1864, when the bellcote was added. It is built in limestone and quartzite, with dressings in limestone and sandstone, and it has a tile roof. The church consists of a nave and a chancel in one cell, and a northeast lean-to vestry. The north and south doorways in the nave date from the 12th century and have round-headed arches and plain tympani. At the west end is a Gothic-style bellcote.	II
St George's Church; 52.64919°N 2.88868°W		Early 14th century (probable)	The earliest surviving part of the church is the chancel. The rest of the church was damaged by the fall of the tower in 1825, and was rebuilt in 1829. The chancel is in sandstone with a tile roof, and the rest of the church is in limestone with a slate roof. The church consists of a nave with a clerestory, north and south aisles, a south porch, a chancel, and a southwest tower. The tower has four stages, angle buttresses, lancet windows and a roundel, a corbel table, a parapet, and a brass weathercock.	II*
Barn northeast of Edgegrove; 52.67452°N 2.88993°W	—	14th or 15th century (probable)	The barn, which was later extended, is timber framed with cruck construction, it is encased in red brick and corrugated iron, and has a roof of tile and corrugated iron. The barn originally had three bays, with two bays added later. Over part of it is a loft, and there is a wide entrance on the east side. Inside are three massive true cruck trusses.	II
Barn northeast of Galliers Farmhouse; 52.65754°N 2.85285°W	—	14th or 15th century (probable)	The barn, which was later extended, is timber framed with cruck construction, it is encased in red brick and limestone, and has a dentilled eaves cornice and a roof of tile and corrugated iron. The barn contains a wide entrance and four casement windows. Inside are three true cruck trusses.	II
Lea Farmhouse; 52.67112°N 2.86537°W	—	14th or 15th century (probable)	The farmhouse was remodelled in the 17th and 19th centuries. It is in brick and limestone, roughcast at the rear, with probably a timber framed core, and the roof is partly tiled and partly slated. The earliest part is a cross-wing to the left, the hall range was added in the 17th century, and an extension with two gables was added in the 19th century. The farmhouse has two storeys, a dentil eaves cornice, and a cellar under the cross-wing. The windows are casements, and the door in the cross-wing has a bracketed hood.	II
Barn, Upper Farm; 52.65741°N 2.92528°W	—	14th or 15th century (probable)	Originally an open hall, later used for other purposes, it was extensively altered in the late 20th century. The barn is timber framed with cruck construction, there is weatherboarding on the northeast gable end, and the rest is clad in corrugated iron. The roof is also in corrugated iron, there are five bays, a wide central doorway, five stable doors, and three eaves hatches. Inside are six massive true cruck trusses.	II
Barn, Woodhall Farm; 52.67124°N 2.82424°W	—	14th or 15th century (probable)	The barn is timber framed with weatherboarding, the west gable end was rebuilt in red brick in the 19th century, and the roof is in corrugated iron. It contains a wide threshing entrance and a doorway with an ogee head.	II
Pear Tree Cottage; 52.62737°N 2.89044°W	—	15th century (probable)	A farmhouse, later a private house, it was remodelled in the 17th century and altered later. It is timber framed with cruck construction, and has brick infill and a tile roof. The house consists of a hall range with one storey and an attic and two bays, and a flush cross-wing with two storeys. The windows are casements, and there are two prominent gabled dormers. Inside there are three true cruck trusses.	II
The Plough Inn and Garage; 52.64724°N 2.88783°W	—	15th century (probable)	A house, later a public house and a garage, it was extended in the 17th century and later. The building is timber framed with cruck construction, and in brick with a dentilled eaves cornice, it is mainly roughcast, and has a tile roof. The house originated as a hall with two unequal bays, and additions have been made to both ends. There are two storeys, and the windows are casements. Inside are parts of two true cruck trusses.	II
Upper Lake Farmhouse; 52.65565°N 2.93079°W	—	15th century (probable)	The farmhouse was partly rebuilt and extended in the 17th century, and altered in the 19th century. The original part is timber framed with cruck construction, it has rendered and brick infill and a red sandstone plinth, the extension is mainly pebbledashed, and the roof is slated, the roof of the extension being hipped. The original part has one storey and an attic, and the extension has two storeys and an attic. The windows are casements, there are gabled dormers in both parts, and in the original part are exposed full cruck trusses.	II
Boycott Hall Farmhouse; 52.66186°N 2.90488°W	—	Late 15th century (probable)	The farmhouse is timber framed, it was encased in red brick and remodelled in the 17th century, and later extended. It has a tile roof, and a roughly T-shaped plan consisting of a former hall with four bays, a cross-wing of four bays, a gabled range in the angle to the north, and a later lean-to. The cross-wing has two storeys and an attic, there is a gabled brick porch, and the windows are casements with segmental heads.	II*
Brookgate Farmhouse; 52.65686°N 2.85137°W	—	1490	A timber framed farmhouse with cruck construction, mainly encased in red brick, and with a tile roof. It originated as a single-bay cruck hall, a wing was added in the 16th century, followed by a larger range in 1612, and the house was restored in 1987–92. There are two storeys and attics, the left hand gable is crow-stepped, the windows are casements, and above the doorway is a hood on consoles. Inside are three true cruck trusses.	II*
Edgegrove; 52.67423°N 2.89039°W	—	Late 15th or early 16th century (probable)	A farmhouse that was remodelled in the 17th century and again in about 1800. It is timber framed, encased and extended in red brick and roughcast, and has tile roofs. There is a T-shaped plan, with a cross-wing at the west, and a later main range extending to the east. The farmhouse has three storeys, and the east front has three bays, a dentilled eaves cornice, sash windows, and a central paired Tuscan porch with a moulded entablature.	II
Home Farmhouse; 52.68740°N 2.84499°W	—	Late 15th or 16th century (probable)	The farmhouse was altered in the 17th century and remodelled in the 19th century. It is partly pebbledashed and partly in painted brick on a timber framed core, and has a tile roof. There are two storeys and an attic, and three gabled bays, the right two bays projecting, and the central gable smaller. All the gables have carved bargeboards and pointed finials. Projecting from the left is a gabled brick porch, and the windows are casements.	II
Cruckmeole Old Hall; 52.68066°N 2.84338°W	—	Late 16th century	A manor house that has been altered and extended, it is timber framed with plaster infill and has a tile roof. The house originally consisted of a hall range of 2½ bays, with a four-bay cross-wing on the left, and a two-storey porch in the angle. In the 17th century extensions were added to the rear. The house has two storeys and attics, and the windows are casements. The porch is gabled and its attic is jettied.	II*
Sibberscote Manor; 52.66338°N 2.84987°W	—	Late 16th century	A farmhouse, then a private house, that was later altered and extended, it is timber framed, largely clad in brick, and with roofs partly slated and partly tiled. There are two storeys and attics, and the house consists of a hall and service bay, and a cross-wing on the left. The attic of the cross-wing is jettied and the upper floor was also jettied, now underbuilt, with a moulded bressumer. On the front is a two-storey porch, the attic and upper floor jettied with moulded bressumers. The windows are casements, and there are gabled dormers.	II
Yew Tree Cottage; 52.64516°N 2.87742°W	—	Late 16th century	The cottage is timber framed with plaster infill on a rendered stone plinth, and has a corrugated iron roof. There is one storey and an attic, and a lean-to on the left gable end. Above the door is a rectangular fanlight, the windows are casements, and there are gabled eaves dormers.	II
Habberley Hall; 52.62697°N 2.89158°W	—	1593	A timber framed manor house with plaster infill on a plinth of stone and brick, it has tile roofs with ornamental cresting. There are two storeys and attics, and the house consists of a small hall range with two projecting cross-wings. The upper floor and attics are jettied, the upper floors with moulded bressumers and carved corner brackets. The gables have bargeboards, there are casement windows, oriel windows, and a gabled dormer. The doorway has carved corner posts and an inscription.	II*
Halston House; 52.66509°N 2.86541°W	—	Late 16th or early 17th century	A farmhouse, later a private house, that has been considerably altered and extended. The original part is timber framed, it has been encased and extended in brick, and has tile roofs. The earlier part is the south range that has two storeys and two bays, and a dentilled eaves cornice. To the north at right angles to the south range are two later parallel ranges with two storeys and attics. Most of the windows are casements, and the doorway has a pediment.	II
Barn northwest of Laburnum Cottage; 52.64928°N 2.89085°W	—	16th or 17th century (probable)	The barn is timber framed with cruck construction, largely clad in brick, with weatherboarding on the gable end, and a corrugated iron roof. There are three bays. it contains a wide entrance and two smaller doorways, and inside are three true cruck trusses.	II
The Old Rectory, Pontesbury; 52.64796°N 2.89012°W	—	Late 16th or 17th century (probable)	The rectory, later a private house, was remodelled in 1767 and later altered and extended. It has a timber framed core, it is encased in limestone with red brick dressings, and haa a roof of slate and tiles. There are two storeys, and the house consists of a hall range of probably 2½ bays, a flush cross-wing of one bay, and subsequent extensions, including a rear outshut. The windows are casements, and above the doorway is a bracketed hood.	II
Arscott House; 52.66494°N 2.83567°W	—	Early 17th century	A timber framed farmhouse with infill and cladding in red brick, and with a tile roof. It consists of a hall range with two storeys and an attic, and three bays, and a projecting cross-wing with two storeys, the upper floor jettied with a bressumer. The windows are casements, those in the ground floor with segmental heads, and there is a hip roofed porch.	II
Cruckmeole House; 52.68067°N 2.84340°W	—	Early 17th century	The house was extensively remodelled in the 18th century, and altered and extended in about 1850. It is in red brick, encasing the original timber framed core, and the roofs are tiled and slated, and hipped at the front. The original house has an L-shaped plan, with a hall and a cross-wing, and the extensions are to the south and the east. There are two storeys, the east front has five bays, the middle three bays projecting under a pediment, and a single-storey wing at each end. In the centre is a doorway with a fanlight and a pediment, and a wrought iron verandah. The windows are sashes, those in the outer bays of the ground floor are tripartite in round-arched recesses.	II
Hinton Farmhouse; 52.66666°N 2.87618°W	—	Early 17th century (probable)	The farmhouse was later considerably extended and altered. It is in red brick with yellow brick headers on a timber framed core, and has slate roofs. There are two storeys with attics in the gables. The farmhouse consists of a two-bay hall range, a projecting cross-wing to the north, and a later south wing and rear extensions. In the angle with the cross-wing is a lean-to porch and a doorway with a rectangular fanlight, and the windows are sashes.	II
Spencer Lodge; 52.65632°N 2.85324°W	—	Early 17th century	A farmhouse that was remodelled and extended in about 1700, and again in the 19th century. The earliest part is timber framed with red brick infill, the later parts are in red brick and limestone, and the roofs are tiled. The original part has one storey and an attic, and the later parts have two storeys. At first the house had an L-shaped plan, the 1700 extension added two bays at the front, and a further two bays were added to the left of this in the 19th century. In the right part of the front is a pedimented stone doorcase, and in both parts the windows are sashes, most with segmental heads.	II
Barn east of Spencer Lodge; 52.65620°N 2.85277°W	—	Early 17th century (probable)	The barn is timber framed, mostly clad in corrugated iron, and it has a tile roof. There are two levels, and the barn contains three eaves hatches, two doors, and a ventilated opening.	II
The Old Rectory, Habberley; 52.62632°N 2.88953°W	—	Early 17th century (probable)	The rectory, later a private house, is timber framed with brick infill on a rendered stone plinth, and has a tile roof. There is one storey and an attic, and the house consists of a hall range of 2½ bays and a two-bay cross-wing projecting on the right. The windows are casements, and in the hall range is a gabled eaves dormer above the entrance.	II
The Red House, Edge; 52.67473°N 2.89139°W	—	Early 17th century	A farmhouse, later a private house, it was considerably extended in about 1800. The original part is timber framed with brick infill. It has two storeys and an attic, and 1½ bays remain. The attic is jettied and has a carved bressumer, and the windows are casements. The roofs of both parts are slated. The later part is built at an angle, and is in red brick, with three storeys and three bays. The central doorway has a semicircular fanlight, and a pediment, and the windows are sashes.	II
Barn east of The Old Rectory; 52.62632°N 2.88919°W	—	Early to mid 17th century	The barn is timber framed with red brick infill and partly weatherboarded on a stone plinth, and it has a corrugated iron roof. There are lofts over the north and south bays, wide garage doors, stable doors, and eaves hatches.	II
Bank Farmhouse; 52.63047°N 2.90694°W	—	17th century	The farmhouse is timber framed with brick infill on a rendered stone plinth, and has a corrugated iron roof. There is one storey and an attic, and an L-shaped plan. On the front is a gabled brick porch.	II
Barn southwest of Bank Farmhouse; 52.63041°N 2.90747°W	—	17th century	The barn is timber framed with weatherboarding on a limestone plinth, it has corrugated iron sheeting on the gables, and a slate roof. The barn contains two doorways and casement windows.	II
Cowhouse northwest of Bank Farmhouse; 52.63058°N 2.90713°W	—	17th century	The cowhouse is timber framed with weatherboarding on a limestone plinth, and has a corrugated iron roof. It contains three ventilated openings.	II
Cowhouse west of Bank Farmhouse; 52.63053°N 2.90742°W	—	17th century	The cowhouse is timber framed on a limestone plinth, with cladding in corrugated iron, and it has a corrugated iron roof. There is an opening below the eaves to right on east side.	II
Brookside Farmhouse; 52.65176°N 2.87340°W	—	17th century (probable)	The farmhouse is in brick, partly rendered, probably with a timber framed core, and has a tile roof. There are two storeys, and an L-shaped plan consisting of a main range with two projecting gables, and a rear range on the right. The windows are casements, and there is a gabled full dormer. All the gables have carved bargeboards and pointed finials.	II
Barn north of Green Acres; 52.66904°N 2.85885°W	—	17th century	The barn is timber framed with weatherboarding on the south side and corrugated iron cladding on the north. The west gable end has been rebuilt in limestone, and the roof is in corrugated iron. There are four bays, with a loft above the eastern bay.	II
Two barns northeast of Hill Farmhouse; 52.64499°N 2.87860°W	—	17th century (probable)	Two adjoining barns, one probably dating from the early 18th century. They are timber framed with red brick infill and roofs of tile and asbestos sheet; the right half of the southern barn has been rebuilt in brick. There are various entrances and a ground floor hatch.	II
Plealey House and stables 52.65679°N 2.85392°W	—	17th century (probable)	A farmhouse that was later remodelled and divided into two dwellings, it is in rendered brick, probably with a timber framed core, and it has a slate roof. The house originally consisted of a hall range with a cross-wing to the northwest, later in the 17th century another cross-wing was added to the southeast, in the 19th century a gabled wing and stables were added to the north. There are two storeys, and the cross-wings also have attics. The windows are a mix of casements and sashes, and there are two gabled porches. The stable is timber framed with red brick infill on a tall red brick plinth.	II
South View Cottages; 52.64885°N 2.88780°W	—	17th century	A row of three timber framed cottages with painted brick infill, gable ends in stone and brick cladding, and a tile roof. There are two storeys and an attic, and four bays. The windows are casements, and there are three doors.	II
The Brook House; 52.65687°N 2.92821°W	—	17th century (probable)	A farmhouse, later a private house, it is in red brick probably with a timber framed core, and has a slate roof. There are two storeys and an attic, and an L-shaped plan. The windows are casements, and above the door is a bracketed hood.	II
The Old Farmhouse; 52.65601°N 2.85191°W	—	17th century (probable)	The farmhouse, later a private house, it was remodelled, especially in the 19th century. The house is in red brick, probably with a timber framed core, with a dentil eaves cornice, and a pantile roof. There are two storeys, originally it had an L-shaped plan, with a main range of six bays, and a twin-gabled projection at the rear, and an extension was added in about 1815. On the front is a Tuscan porch, and the windows are sashes, most with segmental heads.	II
The Old Malthouse; 52.65315°N 2.87341°W	—	17th century (probable)	Originally a barn, later converted into a malthouse, and then into domestic accommodation, it is timber framed, mostly clad in red brick, and has tile roofs. The building has a long range on two levels, paired two-storey gabled projections to the rear, and a single gabled projection at the southwest end. In the projections are round-headed cast iron casement windows with Gothic tracery, and there is a bracket for a former hoist.	II
8 and 9 Asterley; 52.65671°N 2.92903°W	—	1675	A farmhouse that has been considerably remodelled and divided into two dwellings. The building is timber framed with brick infill on a rendered plinth, and has a slate roof. There are two storeys and an attic, originally with three bays, and with a bay added later at each end. The windows are casements, there is a 20th-century dormer, and No. 9 has a pair of bow windows flanking the doorway.	II
1 Little Plealey; 52.65405°N 2.86628°W	—	Late 17th century	A farmhouse, later a private house, it is timber framed with plaster infill on a rendered stone plinth, and has a slate roof. There is one storey and an attic, and two bays. The windows are casements, there are two gabled eaves dormers, and a lean-to porch.	II
Asterley Hall; 52.65699°N 2.92980°W	—	Late 17th century (probable)	A farmhouse with considerable subsequent remodelling, it is in red brick with a dentilled eaves cornice, the rear wall roughcast, on a timber framed core, with a slate roof. There are three storeys, four bays, and a single-storey range to the left with a rounded corner. Most of the windows are casements, there is one sash window and a French window.	II
Barn west of Brookgate Farmhouse; 52.65683°N 2.85231°W	—	Late 17th century (probable)	The barn is timber framed with cladding in weatherboarding and corrugated iron, and a roof of slate, tile, and corrugated iron. The west bay has an inserted loft, and there is a former threshing entrance.	II
Mill House; 52.68036°N 2.84292°W	—	Late 17th century (probable)	A farmhouse, later extended and developed into a private house, it is in painted brick and limestone, with a wide band and a tile roof. There are two storeys and an attic, a main range of three bays, and a rear wing on the left with two storeys and a dentil eaves cornice. The windows are sashes, those in the ground floor with segmental heads, and the entrance is in the angle at the rear.	II
Gate pier northeast of Sibberscote Manor; 52.66348°N 2.84957°W	—	Late 17th century (probable)	The gate pier is in red sandstone, it has a square plan, and is about 1.8 metres (5 ft 11 in) high. The pier has a moulded plinth and capping, and the remains of a finial. The pier is in a railed enclosure.	II
The Den; 52.65589°N 2.85635°W	—	Late 17th or early 18th century (probable)	A former labourer's cottage, it is timber framed with red brick infill, partly rendered, and with a corrugated iron roof. There is one storey and two bays, a loft on the left, and a lean-to on the right. In the centre is a doorway with a casement window to the left and a fixed window to the right.	II
Newnham Hall Farmhouse; 52.68419°N 2.87187°W	—	1723	The farmhouse was remodelled and extended in the 19th century. It is in red brick with a stuccoed front, storey bands, and slate roofs. There are three storeys, originally with an L-shaped plan, and a later rear extension. The front has five bays, a central porch with two pairs of Tuscan columns, and a doorway with a rectangular fanlight. In the left return is a canted bay window, and in the right return is a datestone.	II
Barn north of Hinton Grange; 52.66759°N 2.87614°W	—	Early 18th century (probable)	The barn is timber framed with brick infill and some weatherboarding, on a stone and brick plinth, and has a tile roof. There are three bays, and the barn contains wide doorways and two eaves hatches.	II
Dovecote northeast of Newnham Hall Farmhouse; 52.68430°N 2.87115°W	—	Early 18th century	The dovecote is in red brick, and has a tile roof with raised verges and corbelled eaves. It has a square plan and two levels, with doorways in both levels, the upper doorway approached by external steps. In the loft are square nesting boxes.	II
Barn southeast of The Old Rectory; 52.64774°N 2.89009°W	—	Early 18th century (probable)	The former barn is timber framed with some weatherboarding and cladding in red brick, and has a corrugated iron roof. There are three bays, with a loft above the southern bay. On the west side is a wide entrance.	II
Woodhall Farmhouse; 52.67147°N 2.82461°W	—	Early 18th century	The farmhouse incorporates earlier material, and has been extended and altered. It is in red brick with floor bands, and has a parapet with stone coping and a hipped tile roof. There are three storeys and cellars, and the house consists of a south range and an L-shaped north range. The front has six bays and a doorway with a bracketed hood, and the windows are sashes.	II
Hinton Hall; 52.66635°N 2.87502°W	—	1749	A small country house that was remodelled in the 19th century and extended in about 1923. It is in red brick with hipped slate roofs. There are two storeys, a central block of three bays, flanked by projecting two-bay wings with gables painted to resemble pediments, and a lower and later service range on the right. In the centre is a Tuscan colonnade, and in the service range is a Classical-style portico.	II
Cruckmeole Farmhouse; 52.67926°N 2.84134°W	—	Mid 18th century	The farmhouse is in roughcast brick with bands, wide spreading eaves, and a slate roof. There are two storeys and an attic, and an L-shaped plan with a main range of three bays and a rear wing. The central doorway has a rectangular fanlight and the windows are sashes.	II
Lower Vessons; 52.61300°N 2.89958°W	—	Mid 18th century (probable)	The farmhouse, later a private house, it possibly contains earlier material, and is in red brick with a dentilled eaves cornice and a tile roof. There are two storeys and an attic, three bays, and a lower rear kitchen range. On the front is a gabled porch, and the windows are casements with segmental heads.	II
Barn, Nills Farm; 52.63893°N 2.89355°W	—	Mid to late 18th century (probable)	The barn is timber framed with red brick infill on a stone plinth, and has a tile roof. The left gable end has been rebuilt in red brick, and the right gable end is clad in limestone with weatherboarding above.	II
Cruckton Hall; 52.68614°N 2.84564°W	—	c. 1770	A small country house that was later altered and extended, particularly in the 19th century, and since used as a school. It is in red brick with stone dressings, bands, a stone parapet, and a slate roof. There are three storeys, and a symmetrical plan consisting of a five-bay central range, two-bay projecting cross-wings with open pediments, a later kitchen range to the right, and a single-storey billiard room to the left. The middle three bays project slightly under a pediment, and contain a sandstone Doric porch. The windows are sashes with segmental heads, and in the garden front is a two-storey canted bay window.	II
Arscott Hall; 52.66454°N 2.83423°W	—	Late 18th century	The farmhouse is in red brick with a dentil eaves cornice and slate roofs. It consists of a main block with two storeys and three bays, a two-bay lower range to the right with two storeys, and a two-storey gabled projection at its left corner. The windows are a mix of casements and sashes, and there are two doorways, one in the main range, and the other in an angle with a trellised verandah.	II
Outbuilding southwest of Asterley Hall; 52.65683°N 2.92998°W	—	Late 18th century (probable)	The outbuilding is in red brick with crow-step gables and a corrugated iron roof. It has two levels, and contains a stable door, an inserted hatch, and five rows of air vents.	II
Cowshed, Cruckton Hall; 52.68621°N 2.84475°W	—	Late 18th century (probable)	The cowshed is in red brick with a dentilled eaves cornice, and a tile roof with crow-stepped gables. There are two levels, and it contains two segmental-headed doorways, three eaves hatches, a cart entrance, air vents, and owl holes.	II
Stable block, Cruckton Hall; 52.68651°N 2.84582°W	—	Late 18th century (probable)	The former stable block is in red brick with a dentilled eaves cornice, and a hipped tile roof. There are two storeys, and six bays, the middle two bays projecting under a pediment. In the ground floor is an arcade of two elliptical arches, now blind and infilled with windows, and two blind doorways. Some windows are casements, others are fixed, and there is a roundel below the pediment. On the roof is an octagonal cupola with a lead cap.	II
Earlsdale Cottage; 52.64705°N 2.87421°W	—	Late 18th century (probable)	A pair of cottages later combined into one, it is in limestone with red brick dressings and a slate roof. There is one storey and an attic, the windows are casements with segmental heads, and there are two gabled eaves dormers.	II
The Oaklands; 52.64883°N 2.88611°W	—	Late 18th century (probable)	The house is mainly in limestone, with a painted brick front, a dentilled eaves cornice, and a double-span slate roof. There are two storeys and an attic, and three bays. The porch has Tuscan columns and a moulded entablature, the windows are sashes, and there are two later flat-roofed dormers.	II
White Hall; 52.64945°N 2.88651°W	—	Late 18th century	The house is in plastered brick with a tile roof. Originally it had an L-shaped plan, and additions were made in the angle at the rear. There are three storeys and a front of three bays. In the centre is a Doric porch with a moulded entablature and triglyphs, and a doorway with a rectangular fanlight, and the windows are sashes.	II
Little Halston; 52.65691°N 2.87121°W	—	1780	The farmhouse, which was later extended, is in red brick with a dentil eaves cornice and a tile roof. There are two storeys and an attic, a main range with three bays, an extension to the left, and at the rear is a long central wing with one storey and an attic incorporating stables and a loft, and a single-story wing to the right. The windows are casements with cambered arches, those in the ground floor also mullioned and transomed.	II
Stables attached to Newnham Hall Farmhouse; 52.68417°N 2.87205°W	—	1780	The stables, later used for other purposes, are in red brick with a dentilled eaves cornice, and a slate roof with a crow-stepped west gable end. There are two levels, and the building contains two segmental-headed stable doors and a hatched opening.	II
The Engine House; 52.65468°N 2.87420°W	—	c. 1790	The building originally housed a Newcomen engine for the coal industry. It was later converted into a private house, and is in limestone with patching in brick, and tile roof. There are three storeys, it has a square plan, and the windows are casements.	II
Cliffdale House; 52.64874°N 2.88435°W	—	c. 1800	The house is roughcast with wide spreading eaves and slate hipped roofs. There are three storeys, a main range of three bays, an additional bay to the right, and a recessed bay to the left. In the centre is a doorway with a rectangular fanlight, and the windows are sashes with segmental heads.	II
Horton Lodge; 52.69642°N 2.83021°W	—	c. 1800	A brick farmhouse with a moulded eaves parapet and a slate roof. There are three storeys, and three bays. In the centre is a Tuscan porch with a moulded entablature, the doorway has a rectangular fanlight, and the windows are sashes with segmental heads.	II
Mill Farmhouse; 52.67892°N 2.84563°W	—	c. 1800	Originally a mill and a house incorporating earlier material, later a farmhouse, it has tiled roofs. The house is in red brick with yellow brick headers, a dentilled eaves cornice, and an L-shaped plan. The front range has two storeys and the rear range has three. It has a cast iron trellised porch, a doorway with a fanlight, sash windows in the upper floor, and casement windows in the ground floor. The former mill is in red brick with grey voussoirs, dentilled eaves, three storeys, doors and windows with segmental heads, and a wooden projection for a former hoist.	II
The Middle House; 52.68011°N 2.84187°W	—	c. 1800	A red brick house with a dentilled eaves cornice and a slate roof. There are two storeys and an attic, three bays, and a lean-to on the left. The central doorway has a fanlight and a pediment, and the windows are sash windows with segmental heads.	II
Dovecote, Cruckton Hall; 52.68678°N 2.84512°W	—	Late 18th to early 19th century (probable)	The dovecote is in red brick with a dentilled eaves cornice, a tile roof, and an octagonal plan. It contains an entrance and windows, all with pointed arches. On the top is an octagonal wooden cupola with a ball finial.	II
Nichols memorial 52.64907°N 2.88867°W	—	c. 1820	The memorial is in the churchyard of St George's Church, and is to the memory of members of the Nichols family. It is a pedestal tomb in limestone, and has a square plan. The tomb has a moulded plinth, projecting capping, a scalloped urn finial, and moulded inscription panels.	II
Earlsdale; 52.64658°N 2.87051°W	—	1820–30	A small country house incorporating parts of a 17th-century stone farmhouse. It is in brick and has a hipped slate roof. There are two storeys, an embattled eaves parapet, and a front of four bays. On the front is a two-storey embattled porch with stepped buttresses, and an oriel window. The other windows are Gothick casements with hood moulds, and there are two canted bay windows with embattled parapets.	II
Wall and gateway, Earlsdale; 52.64667°N 2.87027°W	—	1820–30	The wall and gateway are in red brick with stone coping and are in Tudor Revival style. The wall is embattled and runs for about 30 metres (98 ft). In the centre is a round-headed entrance arch, above which is a lancet window.	II
Galliers Farmhouse; 52.65734°N 2.85335°W	—	Early 19th century	The farmhouse incorporates parts of an earlier house, and is in red brick with a slate roof. There are two storeys, a front of three bays, a short range at the rear on the left, and a lower L-shaped range on the right. The central doorway has a fanlight and a pediment, and the windows are sashes.	II
Barn southeast of Habberley Hall; 52.62665°N 2.89103°W	—	Early 19th century	The barn is in red brick with a dentilled eaves cornice and a tile roof. It has an L-shaped plan, with a gable on the left. There are two levels, with a loft in the gable. The openings include an eaves hatch, doors, two hatches in the gable end, and numerous air vents.	II
Heighway memorial 52.64898°N 2.88881°W	—	Early 19th century	The memorial is in the churchyard of St George's Church, and is to the memory of members of the Heighway family. It is a rectangular chest tomb in limestone and has a moulded plinth and capping, a chamfered top ledger and reeded corner pilasters. There are inscription panels on the sides and the top.	II
Polmere Farmhouse; 52.67901°N 2.87301°W	—	Early 19th century	The farmhouse is in reddish-brown brick, and has a slate roof. There are two storeys and an attic, three bays, and a single-storey rear kitchen range with a dentilled eaves cornice. In the centre is a doorway with a semicircular fanlight and a pediment, this is flanked by French windows, and in the upper floor are sash windows.	II
Sundial; 52.64903°N 2.88879°W	—	Early 19th century (probable)	The sundial is in the churchyard of St George's Church. It is in limestone, and consists of a bulbous vase-shaped baluster with a square base and cap. On the cap is a brass plate and a gnomon.	II
The Red House, Plealey; 52.65583°N 2.85237°W	—	Early 19th century	A farmhouse, later a private house, it is in red brick and has a hipped slate roof. There are two storeys and three bays, the middle bay slightly projecting. In the centre is a Tuscan doorcase, and a wreathed and radiating fanlight with imposts and a keystone. The windows are sashes.	II
The Dower House; 52.65289°N 2.87347°W	—	Early 19th century	The house is in limestone with a front of painted brick, a dentilled eaves cornice, and a slate roof. There are two storeys, three bays, a two-storey outshut at the rear, and a single-storey extension recessed to the left. On the front is a flat-roofed trellised porch, and the windows are sashes.	II
Plealey Methodist Church; 52.65739°N 2.85391°W		1828	Originally a Congregational chapel, then a Baptist chapel, and subsequently a Methodist chapel, it is in painted brick, and has a hipped roof with wide eaves. There are sides of three bays, on the front is a wooden Tuscan porch, and along the sides are round-arched multi-paned windows.	II
France memorial and enclosure 52.65740°N 2.85383°W	—	c. 1830	The memorial is in the churchyard of Plealey Methodist Church, and is to the memory of members of the France family, one of whom was the founder of the church. It is a chest tomb in limestone, and has a rectangular plan. The tomb has a moulded plinth and capping, a chamfered top ledger, and fluted corner pilasters. It is surrounded by an enclosure with cast iron railings.	II
Pontesford House Lodge; 52.65229°N 2.87378°W	—	c. 1830	The house, originally the lodge to Pontesford House, is in limestone and has a hipped slate roof. There is one storey and an attic, and a roughly rectangular plan. The eaves are wide and spreading and slope to form a verandah carried on wooden posts. The windows in the ground floor have three lights and segmental heads, and in the roof is a slate-hung gabled dormer on each of the four sides.	II
Gate piers and railings, Pontesford House; 52.65234°N 2.87367°W	—	c. 1830	The gate piers flank the entrance of the drive to the house. They are in limestone and have moulded pyramidal caps. To the right is a low stone wall with wrought iron railings extending for about 60 metres (200 ft), and at the end is another pair of gate piers and a wrought iron gate.	II
Dovecote House; 52.64807°N 2.90230°W	—	c. 1830–40	A farmhouse, later a private house, it is in red brick with a slate roof. There are two storeys and three bays. In the centre is a wrought iron trellised porch and a doorway with a semicircular fanlight and a pediment. The windows are sashes with plastered heads and stone cills.	II
Asterley Methodist Chapel and railings 52.65771°N 2.92604°W		1834	The chapel is in limestone with a dentil eaves cornice and a tile roof. On the front is a gabled porch, above it is a datestone, and the windows are round-headed and multi-paned. In front of the chapel is a small courtyard enclosed by railings.	II
Congregational Church and manse 52.65026°N 2.89248°W		1839	The church and manse are in stuccoed red brick with slate roofs. The church has round-headed multi-paned cast iron windows, and a gabled porch. The manse, which is attached at the west end, has a sash window in the upper floor, and a casement window below.	II
St Thomas' Church, Cruckton; 52.68592°N 2.84077°W		1839–40	The church, designed by Edward Haycock in Early English style, is now redundant, and has been converted for residential use. It is built in limestone with a tile roof, and consists of a nave, a west porch, a chancel, and a south vestry, and on the west gable is a gabled bellcote. All the windows are lancets.	II
Harrison memorial 52.64923°N 2.88807°W	—	Mid 19th century	The memorial is in the churchyard of St George's Church, and is to the memory of Revd. Hamlet Harrison, one-time rector of the church, and members of his family. It is a pedestal tomb in cast iron with a square plan. The tomb has moulded and chamfered capping on a stepped plinth, a flaming torch finial on the top, fluted columns in recesses at the corners, and an inscription panel on the south side.	II
St Anne's Church, Lea Cross; 52.66846°N 2.85347°W		1888	The church is in red brick with a tile roof, and consists of a nave, a west baptistry with a north porch and a south vestry, a central tower with a lean-to north transept, and a chancel. The tower has three stages, a modillioned and corbelled eaves cornice, and a tall pyramidal roof with gabled lucarnes. The baptistry has a projection with a conical roof, at the west end is a rose window, and the chancel has a five-light east window.	II
