= Listed buildings in Longden =

Longden is a civil parish in Shropshire, England. It contains 19 listed buildings that are recorded in the National Heritage List for England. All the listed buildings are designated at Grade II, the lowest of the three grades, which is applied to "buildings of national importance and special interest". The parish contains the village of Longden and smaller settlements, and is otherwise rural. Most of the listed buildings are farmhouses, farm buildings, houses, and cottages, the older buildings being timber framed. The other listed buildings include a church, a small country house, a milestone, and a gazebo.

== Buildings ==
Name and location	Photograph	Date	Notes
Lower Oaks; 52.63726°N 2.85300°W	—	15th century (probable)	The farmhouse was significantly extended twice. It was originally timber framed with cruck construction and brick infill, and has two bays. In about 1600 a two-bay timber-framed cross-wing was added at the west, and in 1873 a stone range with three gables was added at the east. The earlier parts have one storey and attics, the latest part has two storeys, and the roofs are tiled. The windows include casements, fixed windows, and two gabled dormers.
St Ruthen's Church; 52.65242°N 2.82710°W		16th century	The church has been partly rebuilt, and was extensively restored in 1877. It consists of a nave, a west porch and vestry, both gabled, a polygonal chancel, and a lean-to shed on the north. The north and south walls of the nave are in sandstone on a chamfered plinth, the west wall is in reddish-brown brick, the chancel is in red brick with stone dressings, and the roof is tiled. At the west end is a wooden bellcote.
Oaks Hall; 52.64544°N 2.85354°W	—	Late 16th century (probable)	The farmhouse has been considerably altered and extended. It is roughcast, probably basically timber framed, and has a tile roof. There are two storeys, and an H-shaped plan, consisting of a three-bay central range and flanking cross-wings. There is a lean-to porch, and the windows are casements.
Longden Hall Farmhouse; 52.65071°N 2.82433°W	—	c. 1600	The farmhouse was extended in the 17th century. It is in red brick with a hipped tile roof. There are two storeys, the original part was a hall range with four bays, and a cross-wing projecting to the rear was added, giving a front of seven bays. The windows are a mix of casements and sashes, those in the ground floor in round-arched recesses, and there is a gabled porch.
Cross House; 52.65293°N 2.82443°W	—	Early 17th century (probable)	A farmhouse, later a private house, it is timber framed with plastered infill on a red brick plinth, partly rebuilt in brick and partly roughcast, and has tile roofs. It has a T-shaped plan, consisting of a hall range of two storeys and 2½ bays, and a cross-wing facing the road of two storeys and an attic and two bays. There is a central doorway and the windows are sashes.
Moat Hall; 52.66897°N 2.81570°W	—	Early 17th century	A timber framed farmhouse, the ground floor is encased in brick, the upper floor is roughcast, and it has a tile roof. There are two storeys and an attic, and an L-shaped plan, consisting of a three-bay hall range, and a short and lower cross-wing. It has an open timber porch, mullioned and transomed windows, a French window, and gabled dormers.
Great Lyth Manor; 52.65926°N 2.80201°W		Mid 17th century	A small country house that has been altered, particularly in the 20th century. It is in red brick on a chamfered plinth with corbelled bands, and a tile roof. There are two storeys and attics, and an H-shaped plan, consisting of a three-bay central range and projecting two-bay cross-wings with shaped gables. Above the central entrance is a blind round-headed mullioned arch. The windows are cross-windows, and there is a central eaves dormer with a shaped gable.
Barns northwest of Whitley Grange; 52.67939°N 2.80778°W	—	Mid 17th century (probable)	The barns are timber framed, partly with brick infill and partly with weatherboarding, on a brick plinth, and have roofs partly with tiles and partly with corrugated iron. There are two ranges at an acute angle, containing barns and a threshing barn.
Whitley Grange; 52.67909°N 2.80685°W	—	c. 1667	A farmhouse that has been altered and extended, it is in red brick with a hipped slate roof. There are three storeys, an attic and a cellar, and a main block of three by two bays, with additions made in the mid-19th century and in about 1930. The windows have been replaced with casements and sashes. The original entrance is blocked, consisting of a stone arch with a hood mould, quoins, and a damaged armorial shield.
Outbuilding southeast of Oaks Hall; 52.64530°N 2.85336°W	—	Late 17th century	The building is timber framed with red brick infill on a brick plinth, and has a tile roof. The right gable end is clad in brick, and the front wall has been rebuilt in brick. The building contains doors, windows and eaves hatches.
Cherry Cottage; 52.67599°N 2.79426°W	—	Early to mid 18th century (probable)	The cottage is timber framed with roughcast infill and a tile roof. There is one storey and an attic, and one bay. It contains a casement window and a gabled eaves dormer.
Great Lyth Farmhouse; 52.65992°N 2.80250°W	—	Mid 18th century	The farmhouse was later extended. It is in brick with a tile roof. There are two storeys and an attic, and an L-shaped plan, consisting of a main range with three bays, and a lower extension at the rear on the right. In the centre is a gabled porch. The windows in the ground floor are casements, in the upper floor they are sashes with segmental heads, and there is a small gabled eaves dormer.
Longden Wood Farmhouse; 52.63999°N 2.81955°W	—	Late 18th century	The farmhouse is in red brick with a dentilled eaves cornice and a tile roof. There are two storeys and an attic, two bays, and a lower 19th-century extension on each side. The windows are sashes, and there is a gabled porch.
Welbatch Farmhouse; 52.67398°N 2.80076°W	—	c. 1800	The farmhouse is in red brick with a dentilled eaves cornice and a hipped tile roof. There are three storeys and three bays. In the centre is a Tuscan porch, and a doorway with a panelled surround and a semicircular fanlight. The windows are sashes, and there is an inserted French window.
Hall Farmhouse; 52.64962°N 2.82496°W	—	Late 18th or early 19th century	The farmhouse is in red brick with a dentilled eaves cornice and a tile roof. There are two storeys and an attic, and three bays, the left bay gabled. There is one sash window, and the other windows are casements, all with segmental heads.
Milestone; 52.64344°N 2.82936°W		Early 19th century (probable)	The milestone stands at the east side of the road, it is in limestone and has a rounded top. The milestone is inscribed "SALOP/6", indicating that it is 6 miles from Shrewsbury.
Plealey Villa; 52.65782°N 2.84245°W	—	Early 19th century	A brick farmhouse with a hipped tile roof, two storeys, and three bays. In the centre is a Doric porch with a wrought iron balcony, and a round-arched recess containing a doorway with a rectangular fanlight. The windows are sashes.
Farm buildings, Welbatch Farm; 52.67428°N 2.80063°W	—	Early 19th century (probable)	The farm buildings are in red brick with a dentilled eaves cornice and tile roofs. There are two ranges at right angles, forming an L-shaped plan, and two levels. The openings include doorways, windows with segmental heads, eaves hatches, and air vents.
The Summer House; 52.64984°N 2.82589°W		c. 1870	A gazebo in red brick with dressings in grey brick and stone, and a roof of red and grey tiles. It has a hexagonal plan, and two storeys with round-arched windows in the upper storey under small gables. There is a pyramidal roof with a decorative cast iron weathervane.
