= Cruckmeole =

Hamlet in Shropshire, England

Coordinates: 52.679°N 2.841°W

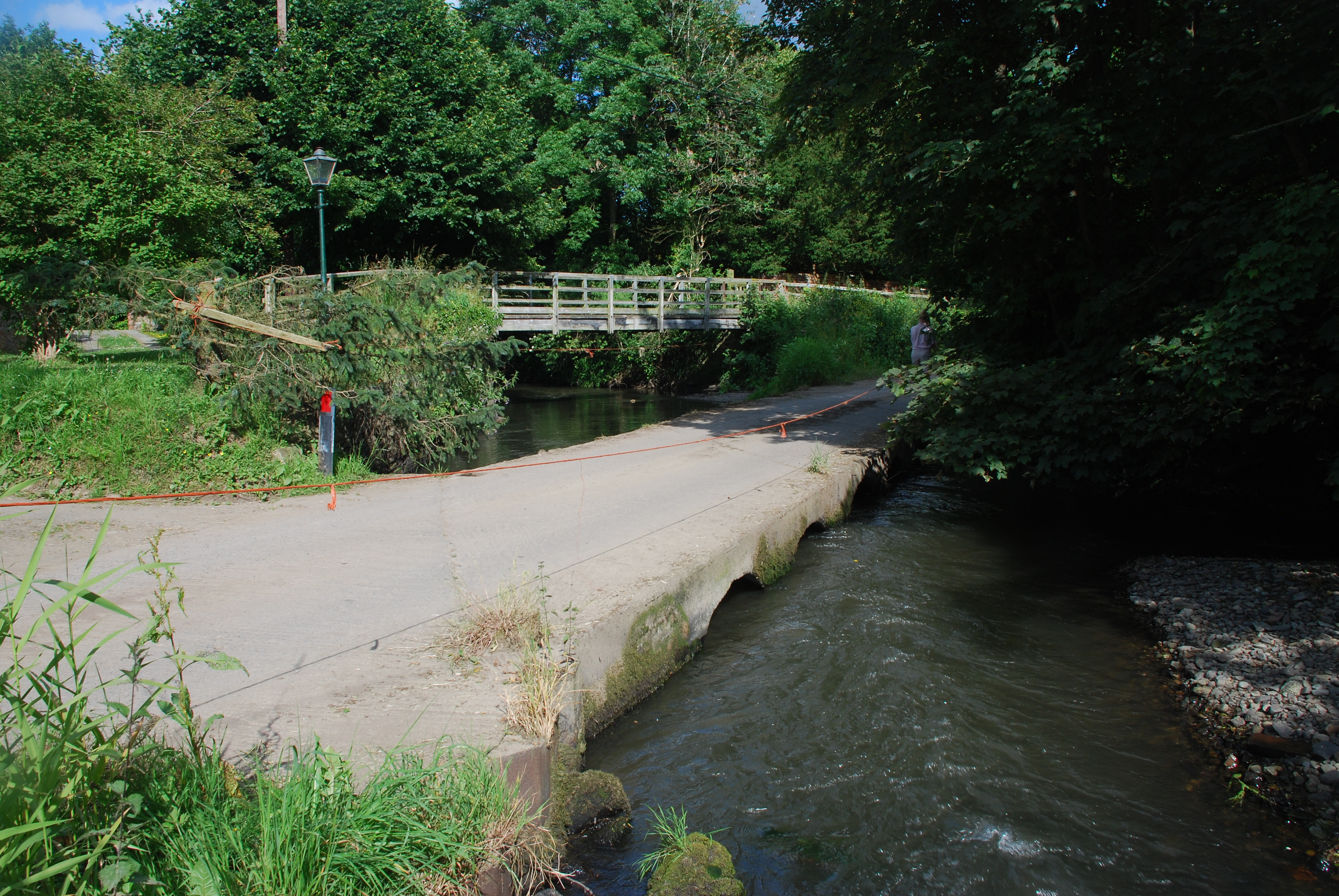
- The ford at Cruckmeole

- Location within Shropshire
- OS grid reference: SJ430094
- Civil parish: Pontesbury
- Unitary authority: Shropshire
- Ceremonial county: Shropshire
- Region: West Midlands
- Country: England
- Sovereign state: United Kingdom
- Post town: SHREWSBURY
- Postcode district: SY5
- Dialling code: 01743
- Police: West Mercia
- Fire: Shropshire
- Ambulance: West Midlands
- UK Parliament: Shrewsbury and Atcham

Cruckmeole is a small hamlet in Shropshire, England. It is located on the A488, where a lane which connects Cruckmeole to the B4386 crossroads at Cruckton forms a three way junction near to Hanwood. It is within the civil parish of Pontesbury.

== Etymology ==
Cruckmeole's name is first attested in 1291 or 1292, in the forms Crokmele and Crokemele. There are two competing etymologies. The first element, also found in nearby Cruckton, could be from the Old English word crōc ("cruck-framed building"). If so, the second part of the name comes from the Meole Brook, on which the settlement stands, and whose own name could come from Old English meolu ("meal, flour") on account of its putatively cloudy colour. Alternatively, the name could come from the Common Brittonic words found today in modern Welsh as crug ("hillock") and moel ("bare"). In this interpretation, the name of the settlement once meant "bare hillock". When the dominant language of the area became English, English-speakers, no longer understanding the name, imagined that the name of the settlement came from the brook, and called the brook Meole Brook accordingly by folk-etymology. Thus the name either once meant "building by the Meole Brook" or "bare hillock".

== Geography ==
The Cambrian Line railway passes close to the village on its way from Shrewsbury to the west Wales coast. There was a junction from which ran the Minsterley branch line, created in 1861, passing through Pontesbury and terminating in Minsterley but this closed, as a result of the Beeching Axe, in 1967.

A residential school, Cruckton Hall, is located near the village. The building of a former primary school within the village, built 1872 but closed in 1969, now serves as Cruckton Village Hall. A Royal Mail post box is in a wall at the Cruckmeole junction.

The Rea Brook, historically called the Meole Brook, flows through the village.

== Notable people ==
John Wood Warter (1806–1878), antiquarian and cleric, son-in-law and editor of the works of Robert Southey, was born at Cruckmeole.

== See also ==
- Listed buildings in Pontesbury
- Cruckton
