= Listed buildings in Great Hanwood =

Great Hanwood is a civil parish in Shropshire, England. The parish contains nine listed buildings that are recorded in the National Heritage List for England. All the listed buildings are designated at Grade II, the lowest of the three grades, which is applied to "buildings of national importance and special interest". The parish contains the village of Hanwood and the surrounding countryside. The listed buildings consist of a church and memorials in the churchyard, houses and associated structures, two farmhouses, and a bridge.

== Buildings ==
Name and location	Photograph	Date	Notes
The White House; 52.68131°N 2.82341°W	—	Early 17th century (probable)	Originally a farmhouse, it was later altered and extended. The building is timber framed with plaster and brick infill, and has a tile roof. There is one storey and an attic, and it consists of a hall range of 3½ bays and a projecting two-bay cross-wing to the left. There is a porch in the angle, some windows are fixed and others are casements, and there are two gabled dormers. Attached to the right end are former 19th-century stables in brick painted to resemble timber framing.
Upper Edgebold Farmhouse; 52.69599°N 2.80287°W	—	Early 17th century (probable)	The farmhouse, which was extended in the 19th century, is basically timber framed and encased in brick, and has a tile roof. It has two storeys, and consists of a hall range, a cross-wing, and a later extension to the rear of the cross-wing. There is a flat-roofed porch in the angle, and the windows are replacement casements.
Stables, The White House; 52.68176°N 2.82329°W	—	Late 17th century (probable)	The former stables are timber framed with weatherboarding on a stone plinth, the gables are partly rebuilt in red brick, and it has a corrugated iron roof. The building contains two doors and a ventilation opening.
St Thomas' Church; 52.68138°N 2.82433°W		1701	The church contains earlier material, possibly a medieval sandstone plinth, and it was rebuilt and extended in 1856. The church consists of a nave, a north porch, a polygonal chancel, a southeast vestry, and a northeast organ chamber. At the west end is a tile-hung belfry with a pyramidal roof.
Newton Farmhouse; 52.69079°N 2.79849°W	—	Late 18th century	The farmhouse is in red brick with a tile roof, and has a T-shaped plan. There are two storeys and an attic, and a front of five bays. On the front is a gabled brick porch, and the doorway has a rectangular fanlight. The windows are sashes with segmental heads, and there are three gabled eaves dormers.
The Old Rectory; 52.68143°N 2.82393°W		Late 18th century	The rectory, later a private house, is in red brick with a tile roof, three storeys, and five bays. In the centre is a gabled timber porch and a doorway with a rectangular fanlight. The windows are sashes with segmental heads, and in the top floor they are blind.
Whitehurst memorial 52.68132°N 2.82416°W	—	c. 1800	The memorial is in the churchyard of St Thomas' Church, it is to the memory of members of the Whitehurst family, and is a pedestal tomb with a square plan. The tomb has a moulded plinth and capping, and square corner pilasters.
Hanwood Bridge; 52.68008°N 2.82996°W	—	Early 19th century	The bridge carries the A488 road over a stream. It is in limestone and conglomerate, and consists of a single segmental arch. The bridge has a flat string course, parapet and rectangular corner piers.
Bromley memorial 52.68143°N 2.82428°W	—	c. 1836	The memorial is in the churchyard of St Thomas' Church, and is to the memory of members of the Bromley family. It is a chest tomb in limestone, and has a rectangular plan. The tomb has a moulded plinth and capping, with a chamfered top and fluted corner pilasters.
