= Hanwood =

Village in Shropshire, England

Coordinates: 52.681°N 2.824°W

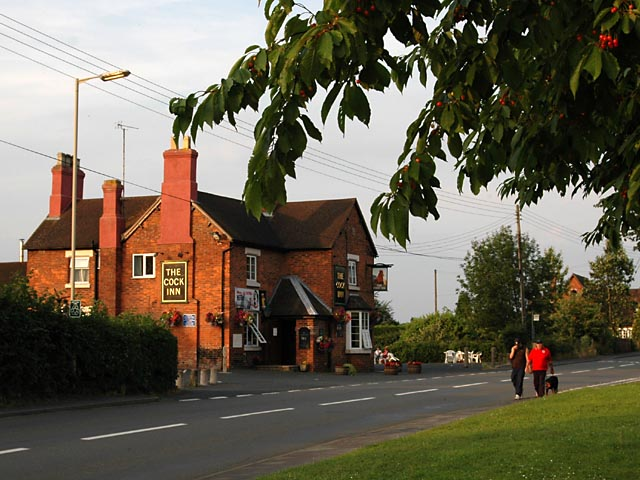
- The Cock Inn public house, Hanwood

- Location within Shropshire
- Population: 1,090 (2011)
- OS grid reference: SJ443096
- Civil parish: Great Hanwood
- Unitary authority: Shropshire
- Ceremonial county: Shropshire
- Region: West Midlands
- Country: England
- Sovereign state: United Kingdom
- Post town: SHREWSBURY
- Postcode district: SY5
- Dialling code: 01743
- Police: West Mercia
- Fire: Shropshire
- Ambulance: West Midlands
- UK Parliament: Shrewsbury

Hanwood is a large village in Shropshire, England.

It is located 3 miles (4.8 km) SW of Shrewsbury town centre, on the A488 road. The A5 is only a mile away. The Cambrian Line runs through the village but there is no longer a railway station here. It was closed in 1964, as a result of the Beeching Axe. The nearest working passenger station is at Shrewsbury.

The Rea Brook flows through the village and the village is laid along the floor of a small valley.

The village forms the main of the civil parish of Great Hanwood.

== Etymology ==
It is thought Hanwood derives its name from the Teutonic word "Han" or "Hane", meaning "cock", denoting a large number of woodcock living in what were then extensive woods of the vicinity. In the Domesday Book of 1086, it is named "Hanewde".

== Village facilities ==
Hanwood has a small combined post office and shop, a garage (but no longer a petrol station), a pub (The Cock Inn), and a primary school, named St. Thomas' & St. Anne's C. of E., which serves an area previously covered by schools at Cruckmeole and Lea Cross as well as Hanwood itself. There are three Royal Mail post boxes at different points along the A488 in the centre of the village.

Hanwood's Village hall was originally built in 1938 as the Pavilion for the social use of miners then working at the former Hanwood Colliery and it has been extended or refurbished a number of times since it was given to the Hanwood Parish Council.

== Parish church ==
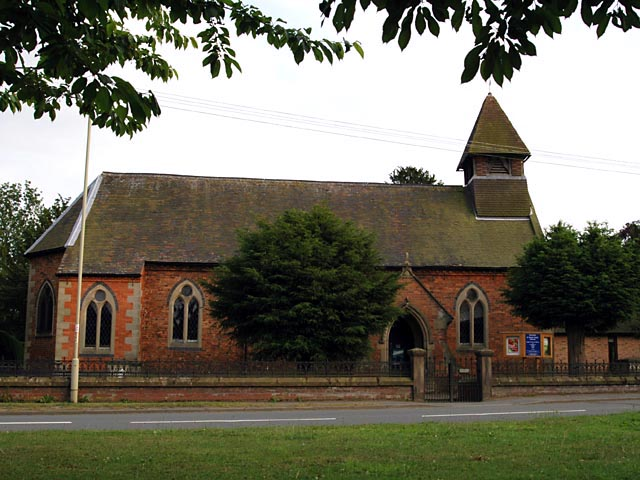

The oldest part of the Church of England parish church of St Thomas, a Grade II Listed Building, is a circular Norman font and a priest of Hanwood is recorded as early as 1277.

The chiefly red brick nave-and-chancel church was rebuilt in 1701, and reconstructed in 1856 by Shrewsbury architect John Laurence Randal, who rebuilt the south wall of the nave, extended the nave westwards, and added the north porch, vestry and tiled timber bellcote. There is stone masonry at the foundation level that may have come from the mediaeval church and the east window frame in the chancel apse has some 15th-century masonry. The stained glass windows in the chancel and one of the others in the nave, were installed in 1856 by Shrewsbury glass-stainers David and Charles Evans.

Besides a painted wooden war memorial plaque listing parish dead of both World Wars, the church contains a number of family war memorials in various forms. The stone pulpit was given by his parents in memory of Walter Atherton (killed in 1917), replacing a wooden pulpit that had been in the church since before its 1856 rebuild, and a brass eagle-shaped lectern in memory of his kinsman, Charles William Atherton (killed 1915), while a marble plaque lists five members of the De Grey-Warter family who died on active service in India, World War I and World War II.

A single-storey extension with meeting room, kitchen, toilet and other facilities was added at the south-west corner in 2003.

The churchyard contains one Commonwealth war grave, of an airman who died in 1943, in addition to two family tombs of the Whitehurst and Bromley families, which are Grade II Listed structures in their own right.

Hanwood was a single church benefice throughout the 20th century. Since the last Rector of Hanwood in its own right left in 1999 St Thomas' parish is now part of the Church of England Benefice of Hanwood, Longden and Annscroft with Pulverbatch, within the Diocese of Hereford.

== Local government ==
The village is the main settlement of the civil parish of Great Hanwood whose governing body is the unwarded Great Hanwood Parish Council, and has also been represented on the unitary Shropshire Council since 2009. Up to 2009 the civil parish was doubly represented, in both the Shrewsbury and Atcham Borough Council and the Shropshire County Council, which both ceased to exist that year with the creation of the unitary council. It is represented in Parliament within the Shrewsbury constituency.

== Hanwood Colliery and brickworks ==
From the 19th to the early 20th century the main industrial employer of Hanwood was coal mining, by the Hanwood Colliery, whose shaft was strictly outside the parish boundary to its west within the parish of Pontesbury near Cruckmeole. It was working in 1873, owned by Samuel Atherton of Cruckmeole who also owned another colliery nearby at Shorthill. It was sold in 1921 to Arthur Nicholas Fielden who linked it underground to a colliery already owned by him at Moat Hall near Annscroft. It continued, with an underground workforce that decreased from 248 in 1921 to 50 by 1941, until fully closing in 1942. The coal mined was in a seam known as Thin Coal, 25,000 tons a year being produced by the colliery in the last two decades it operated. The shaft was 468 feet deep, the seam was a half-yard (18 inches) thick and 900 feet underground at the furthest point from the shaft, and ultimately entailed a long walk of about two and a half miles of gradual slope to and from the coalface.

The area worked for coal extended between the Shrewsbury-Yockleton road in the north, Wood Hall and Moat Hall in the south, Cruckton and Shorthill in the west and Hanwood Bank to the east.

A by-product of the coal mining was clay which was utilized in brick-making, in addition to that from a claypit in Orchard Lane, Hanwood. The brickworks also being owned by the Athertons/Fieldens, and another employer of Hanwood men. It utilized the coal from the Hanwood pit, which was known for easily igniting and producing an intense heat, but ceased working by 1945. Hanwood bricks were in great demand as liners as they were cheaper than most other Shropshire-made bricks.

== Notable residents ==
- Clopton Lloyd-Jones (1858 at Hanwood–1918), sportsman noted for scoring the only goal of the 1880 FA Cup Final, was born at Hanwood House, which was demolished in 1971 and on whose site was laid out a private housing estate consisting of Woodlands Avenue, Chestnut Close and Beech Close. Hanwood Church contains a memorial plaque. In 1901 he inherited, but did not inhabit, the house called "The Glen" (previously "Hanwood Villa") beside the church.
- Lieutenant-General Sir Edwin Alderson (1859–1927) had his home at The Glen as a subtenant in the years 1914 to 1916, coinciding with his period commanding the Canadian Expeditionary Force in World War I. He unveiled the village's war memorial cross (north side of main road adjacent Cock Inn) in 1921, when he admitted he was living in the village when the war started and claimed to be the first resident called on for active service.
- John Strand Jones (1877–1958), former Wales Rugby Union football international, was a resident Rector of Hanwood from 1929 to 1934.
- Lily Chitty (1893–1979), archaeologist, grew up in Hanwood while her father was Rector there between 1899–1920. The rectory they lived in (now demolished) was on the site of the present Rectory Gardens housing estate.
- Derwas Chitty (1901 at Hanwood–1971), Anglican priest, writer and archaeologist, was born and grew up in Hanwood with his sister Lily.
- Bill Longmore (1938–2018 at Hanwood), Police and Crime Commissioner for West Mercia Police 2012–2016, lived in Hanwood where he was a parish councillor.

== Community media ==
There is a Hanwood Community Facebook page, launched in 2012, advertising community activities, at . The church has an associated website (), giving information on current church and community activities.

The parish is within the reporting and circulation area of two newspapers, the daily evening Shropshire Star and the weekly Shrewsbury Chronicle.

== Hanwood United ==
The first incarnation of Hanwood United F.C. came about in 1890. From 1906 to the 1930s they were known as Hanwood Rangers, from the 1930s to 1948 they operated under the name of Hanwood Colliery or Miners Welfare, and from 1948 to 1958 as Hanwood Athletic, reforming under their present name in 1965.

Its home pitch is on the recreation ground of Hanwood Village Hall. On 4 March 2022, the ground hosted a match by outside Sunday League teams Bull In The Barne United and Harlescott Rangers when Brazilian guest player for Bull In The Barne, Roberto Carlos scored a goal during a 4–3 defeat to Harlescott Rangers.

== See also ==
- Listed buildings in Great Hanwood
- Cruckmeole
- Pontesbury
- Edgebold
