= Cruckton =

Village in Shropshire, England

Coordinates: 52.687°N 2.844°W

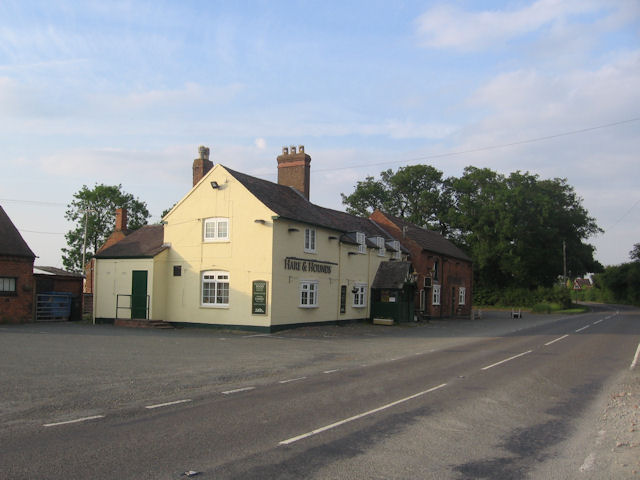
- The village pub at Cruckton, the Hare and Hounds, currently (2023) being converted into multiple houses/homes

- Location within Shropshire
- OS grid reference: SJ430103
- Civil parish: Pontesbury
- Unitary authority: Shropshire
- Ceremonial county: Shropshire
- Region: West Midlands
- Country: England
- Sovereign state: United Kingdom
- Post town: SHREWSBURY
- Postcode district: SY5
- Dialling code: 01743
- Police: West Mercia
- Fire: Shropshire
- Ambulance: West Midlands
- UK Parliament: Shrewsbury

Cruckton is a small village in Shropshire, England (grid reference SJ430103). Cruckton is situated approximately five miles from Shrewsbury town centre, off the B4386 road to Montgomery, Powys. The postcode begins SY5. It is within the civil parish of Pontesbury and the Shrewsbury and Atcham parliamentary constituency.

== Village ==
In 1870–72, John Marius Wilson's The Imperial Gazetteer of England and Wales described Cruckton like this:

"CRUCKTON, a chapelry, with a village, in Pontesbury parish, Salop; 3 miles WSW of Shrewsbury town and r[ailway]. station. Post town, Shrewsbury. Real property,[value] £4,981. Pop[ulation]., 155. The property is divided among a few. Cruckton Hall is the seat of the Harrieses. The living is a p[erpetual]. curacy, annexed to the second Pontesbury rectory, in the diocese of Hereford. The church is good."

The village has a crescent of council-built houses, called Church Close (originally Rural Cottages). They were built in 1949, close to St Thomas' Church. The latter was built (with Edward Haycock as architect) as a daughter church to the then parish church at Pontesbury in 1840 and closed by 1985, since when it has been a private home called Church House. At the time of the crescent's building the site of a Roman villa was found on the green.

== Fitzroy Academy ==
The publicly-funded Cruckton Hall School, opened in 1978, was a specialist boarding school for boys with special needs or behavioural challenges associated with autism spectrum disorders, including autism and Asperger syndrome.

Cruckton Hall School closed in the late 2010s, amid allegations of serious abuse. Several things had happened earlier in that decade that may have led to it - the retirement of its original headmaster, many other staff leaving, and a change of ownership from Young Options Group to Kisimul Group.

The site is now the Headquarters of the New Reflexions group, a specialist-school organisation, providing for children who have emotional behavioural difficulties. Their Fitzroy Academy was opened on the site in February 2022.

== Notable people ==
- Sir Thomas Harries, 1st Baronet (1550-1628), lawyer, was son of a Cruckton landed family.
- Sir Richard Jenkins, Chairman of the East India Company and M.P. for Shrewsbury 1837–41, was born at Cruckton, on 18 February 1785.
- Civil engineer Sir William Francis lived at Cruckton.
- In 2012, reality star Scott Disick purchased a Lord of the Manor title from Cruckton Ford.x.com

== See also ==
- Listed buildings in Pontesbury
- Cruckmeole
