= Lily Chitty =

British archaeologist and antiquarian

Lily Frances Chitty OBE FSA
- Born: 20 March 1893; Lewdown, Devon, England
- Died: 8 February 1979 (aged 85); Church Stretton, Shropshire, England

Academic background
- Education: Shrewsbury School of Art

Academic work
- Discipline: Archaeology
- Sub-discipline: Prehistoric archaeology; Archaeology of Wales; Archaeology of the west of England; Bronze Age Britain; Prehistoric Wales

Lily Frances "Lal" Chitty, OBE, FSA (20 March 1893 – 8 February 1979) was a British archaeologist and independent scholar, who specialised in the prehistoric archaeology of Wales and the west of England. She has been described as one of the "pioneers in the mapping of archaeological data".

== Early life and education ==
Chitty was born on 20 March 1893 at Lewdown, Devon, England. She was the eldest child of the Reverend James Charles Martin Chitty (1865–1938) and Gwen Ethlin Georgiana Chitty (née Jones; 1861–1933). One of her two younger brothers was the archaeologist and priest Derwas Chitty. In 1899, James Chitty was appointed Rector of Hanwood, and so the family moved to Shropshire. She was educated at home, before attending the Shrewsbury School of Art between 1910 and 1915.

== Career ==
Chitty had intended to continue her artistic studies, but chose instead to train as a secretary in order to contribute to the war effort during the First World War. She then worked at the General Post Office in London for a short period of time, before serving as a member of the Women's Land Army in her home county of Shropshire for the rest of the war. The Women's Land Army was a civilian organisation created so that women, nicknamed the "Land Girls", could replace men working on farms who had been called up to the military.

After the end of the war, Chitty returned to the family home. Her father was made Rector of Yockleton, also in Shropshire, in 1920. During this time she developed her interest in archaeology and particularly in prehistoric artefacts. In 1924, she was appointed the Ordnance Survey's honorary correspondent for archaeology in Shropshire. In 1926, she also became the local contact for the Ancient Monuments Board. Having met Harold Peake, during 1927 she was tasked with "drawing bronze implements for the British Association". Around this time, she began to create an analytical card index of "national and local archaeological periodicals and other literature"; this would become an important database for professional archaeologists and students. Her artistic training meant that she was asked by Cyril Fox to draw the maps for his book The personality of Britain (1935); however, these were not acknowledged as her work until the third edition which was published in 1938.

In 1938, Chitty's father died and she moved in with her brother, Derwas Chitty, who was the then Rector of Upton, Berkshire. She managed his household until he married fellow archaeologist Mary Kitson Clark in 1943. She then moved by herself, returning to the family's house in Pontesbury, Shropshire. She once more became the local archaeological expert, having been appointed the "Chief Correspondent for Shropshire Ancient Monuments Department". She "drew artefacts, researched and mapped find sites, published reports, and helped to improve local museum collections". She also turned once more to indexing and was asked by the Cambrian Archaeological Association to do so for its Archaeologia Cambrensis. Published in 1964, the index has been described as the "best index for this particular publication".

In addition to the indexes she produced, Chitty wrote and published 146 articles in scholarly journals. These were mainly artefact reports on single objects, but she also expanded upon incomplete or incorrect early publications concerning Bronze Age hoards.

== Later life ==
In old age, Chitty retained an interest in archaeology, and attended many of the activities (including lectures and excursions) of the learned societies of which she was a member. She became ill due to hypothermia in January 1979, and died on 8 February 1979 at the Hillside Rest Home, Church Stretton, Shropshire. She is buried in the Pontesbury Cemetery in Shropshire.

== Honours ==
In 1939, Chitty was elected a Fellow of the Society of Antiquaries of London (FSA). In 1957, she was awarded an honorary Master of Arts (MA) degree by the University of Wales. In the 1956 New Year Honours, she was appointed an Officer of the Order of the British Empire (OBE) in recognition of her work as "Chief Correspondent for Shropshire Ancient Monuments Department".

In 1972, a Festschrift was published in Chitty's honour. It was titled Prehistoric Man in Wales and the West: Essays in Honour of Lily F. Chitty and edited by Frances Lynch and Colin B. Burgess. Contributors included W. F. Grimes, F. W. Shotton, and Richard J. C. Atkinson.

== Selected works ==
- Chitty, L. F. (1925). "Three bronze implements from the Edgebold Brickyard, Meole Brace, Shropshire". The Antiquaries Journal, 5(04), 409–414.
- Chitty, L. F. (1936). "Single-faced Palstaves in Portugal and in Ireland". Proceedings of the Prehistoric Society (New Series), 2(1–2), 236–238.
- Varley, W. J., Jackson, J. W., & Chitty, L. F. (1940). Prehistoric Cheshire (No. 1). Cheshire rural community council.
- Chitty, L. F., & Lily, F. (1963). "The Clun-Clee Ridgeway: a prehistoric trackway across south Shropshire", in Culture and Environment: essays in hour of Sir Cyril Fox.
- Chitty, Lily F. (1964). Index to Archaeologia Cambrensis, 1846–1900. Cardiff: Cambrian Archaeological Association.
