= Arscott =

Hamlet in Shropshire, England

Coordinates: 52.664°N 2.836°W

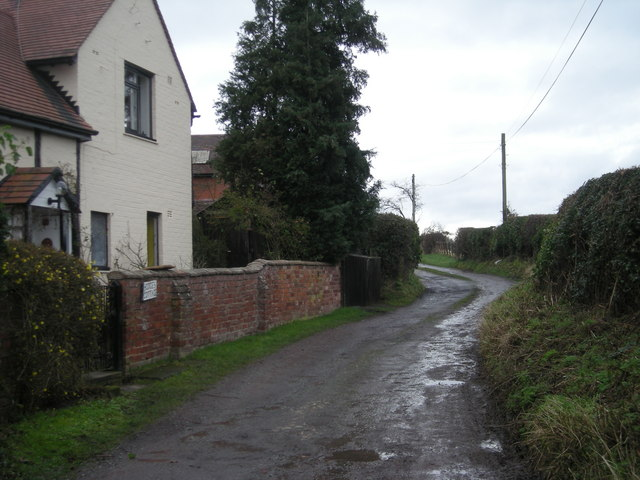
- Path to Coppice Farm

- Location within Shropshire
- OS grid reference: SJ434077
- Civil parish: Pontesbury
- Unitary authority: Shropshire
- Ceremonial county: Shropshire
- Region: West Midlands
- Country: England
- Sovereign state: United Kingdom
- Post town: SHREWSBURY
- Postcode district: SY5
- Dialling code: 01743
- Police: West Mercia
- Fire: Shropshire
- Ambulance: West Midlands
- UK Parliament: Shrewsbury and Atcham

Arscott is a small hamlet in Shropshire, England. It is near to Plealey, Shorthill and Annscroft and within the civil parish of Pontesbury.

The hamlet is spread out along Pound Lane and has a number of Victorian cottages associated with the local farms or coal mines working as early as 1838, the last closing in 1919.

Nearby is the hamlet of Arscott Villa, which adjoins Annscroft.

There is an 18-hole golf course at Arscott, which opened in 1992 and is the home of the Arscott Golf Club.

== See also ==
- Listed buildings in Pontesbury
