= Great Hanwood =

Civil parish in Shropshire, England

Coordinates: 52.682°N 2.827°W

Great Hanwood is a civil parish in Shropshire, England.

The population in 2001 was 1,023 and there were 457 households, rising to 1,090 at the 2011 Census in 494 households. Its main settlement is the village of Hanwood. Hanwood Bank is a smaller settlement adjoining Hanwood, further north-east on the A488 towards Shrewsbury.

== See also ==
- Listed buildings in Great Hanwood
