= Asterley =

Village in Shropshire, England

Coordinates: 52.657°N 2.926°W

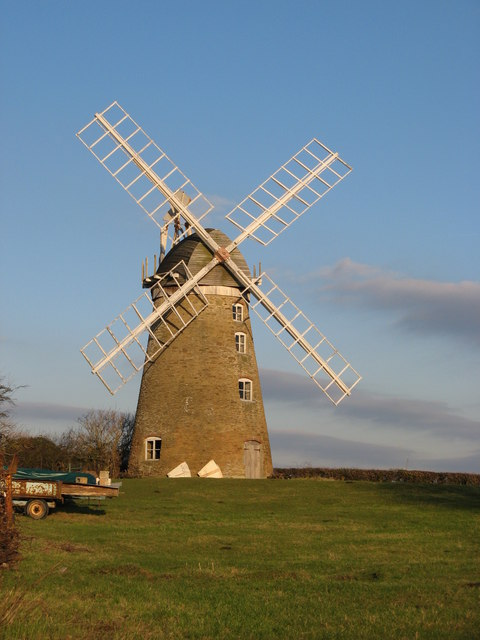
- Asterley windmill

- Location within Shropshire
- OS grid reference: SJ373070
- Civil parish: Pontesbury
- Unitary authority: Shropshire
- Ceremonial county: Shropshire
- Region: West Midlands
- Country: England
- Sovereign state: United Kingdom
- Post town: SHREWSBURY
- Postcode district: SY5
- Dialling code: 01743
- Police: West Mercia
- Fire: Shropshire
- Ambulance: West Midlands
- UK Parliament: Shrewsbury and Atcham

Asterley is a village in Shropshire, England. Its name, derived from Old English, means "the eastern clearing in the forest".

It was historically a township of the large parish of Pontesbury, and is still part of the civil parish of Pontesbury. It consists of some 50 houses, including some timber- and cruck-framed dwellings.

There are four farms operating within the village and an equestrian estate.

There is a brick former Church of England mission church in the village, built in 1869 but a private house since about 1990,. Its churchyard contains the graves of two World War II soldiers who both died in 1940, which are registered and maintained by the Commonwealth War Graves Commission.

There is a functioning Methodist chapel which is part of the Shropshire and Marches Methodist Circuit. Eight of the Methodist churches in the area voted on 15 July 2019 to become an amalgamation of chapels to be called Rea Valley Methodist Churches keeping each chapel operational as a cooperative. In this new Methodist Society, Asterley will become a Celebration Chapel and offer special worship services four to five times a year. The chapel was built in 1834. A stone World War I memorial tablet is next to its entrance door outside and indoors is a framed Roll of Honour to local men who died in World War II. The village had a small and possibly shortlived Latter Day Saints congregation in 1851.

The village has had two pubs, The Royal Oak and The Windmill Inn, a shop and a school house which are all now private houses.

In the 18th and 19th centuries the village was the centre of a small-scale coal mining and brick-making industry. It has a long established connection with farming with many established farmhouses being present in the village an immediate surroundings.

In 1944, a Republic P-47 Thunderbolt fighter crashed in what was a deep pond which was originally a marl pit. The pilot survived by jumping by parachute from the stricken aircraft. The aircraft remains buried in the now dried out and filled in pond.

Outside the village is a rare survival, a windmill built in 1809. It was restored in the 1980s.

== See also ==
- Listed buildings in Pontesbury
