= Rea Brook =

River in Shropshire, England

Rea Brook Meole Brook
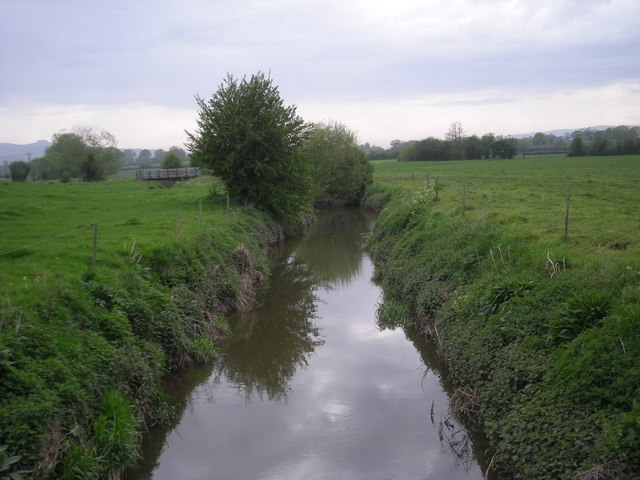
- Rea Brook near Malehurst

Location
- Country: England
- Counties: Shropshire

Physical characteristics
- Source: Marton Pool
  - coordinates: 52.618°N 3.040°W
  - elevation: 101 m (331 ft)
- Mouth: Confluence with River Severn
  - location: Shrewsbury, Shropshire
  - coordinates: 52.7058°N 2.7468°W
  - elevation: 47 m (154 ft)
- Length: 40 km (25 mi)

Basin features
- Tributaries
  - left: Weston Brook, Rowley/Brockton/Worthen Brook, Workhouse Brook, Aston Brook, Asterley Brook, Westbury Brook
  - right: Minsterley Brook, Pontesford Brook, Clan Brook, Bran Brook, Money Brook, Sutton Spa

The name Rea Brook can refer to either of two brooks in Shropshire, England.

One of the brooks, which eventually becomes the River Rea, is in southern Shropshire. It is to the east of Brown Clee Hill.

The other, described here, is a minor river that begins at Marton Pool, near the Wales-England border. This runs northeast for 40 kilometres (25 mi) past the villages of Minsterley, Pontesbury, Hanwood, Hook-a-Gate and Bayston Hill to Shrewsbury, where it joins the much larger River Severn at Coleham Head. It is noted in the county for its wildlife, such as otters and kingfishers.

== Names and etymology ==
The pronunciation of "Rea" varies between /riː/ REE and /reɪ/ RAY. The pronunciation most used by locals for the Shrewsbury river is /riː/; the /reɪ/ pronunciation may have been introduced by incomers from Birmingham, where a different River Rea is pronounced that way. The spelling of the brook's name also varies between Rea Brook and Reabrook. The former form is used by Natural England and on Ordnance Survey maps. The latter spelling is from Shropshire Council's own webpage about Rea Brook Valley.

Previously in history, the Rea Brook was known as the Meole Brook, and gives its name to two villages near Shrewsbury – Meole Brace and Cruckmeole. There are two competing etymologies for the name of the brook. One is that it is simply the Old English word meolu ("meal, flour"), supposedly given because of the brook's cloudy colour. In this interpretation, the brook then gave its name to Crucmeole, whose first element would be the Old English word crōc ("cruck-framed building"), and whose name would thus originally have meant "cruck-framed building on the Meole Brook". Alternatively, the name of Cruckmeole could come from the Common Brittonic words found today in modern Welsh as crug ("hillock") and moel ("bare"). In this interpretation, the name of the settlement once meant "bare hillock". When the dominant language of the area became English, English-speakers, no longer understanding the name, imagined that the name of the settlement came from the brook, and called the brook Meole Brook accordingly by folk-etymology.

== Characteristics ==
Rea Brook has changed dramatically since the start of the 21st century with a downturn in the recorded numbers of coarse fish. The Environment Agency put this down to the brook changing from a high capacity watercourse into a fast flowing one. It has been noted that the brook is still plentiful with salmonid type fish.

When the brook reaches Shrewsbury, it flows through a local nature reserve designated in 1994 as the Reabrook Valley Country Park. The valley is noted for its wildlife, specifically otters and orchids that are rare in that part of Shropshire. In its final reaches it curves westwards to its confluence with the River Severn just off Coleham Head in the town. The brook flooded extensively in 2000, 2007 and 2010.

After the flooding in 2000, it was suggested that a tunnel and culvert be created to divert water away from Rea Brook eastwards where it would enter the River Severn a point further downstream and out of the environs of Shrewsbury. As the cost of this work would have exhausted the funds put aside for flood defences in the town, it was discounted.

The 2007 flooding destroyed a bridge which was rebuilt in 2008 with additional archaeological excavations on the leat that ran alongside the Rea Brook in the valley at Shrewsbury. The leat (or mill race) had existed since the medieval period, and was disused at the time of the flooding. The bridge repairs necessitated diverting the Rea Brook into the former leat.
