= Pontesford =

Coordinates: 52.653°N 2.874°W

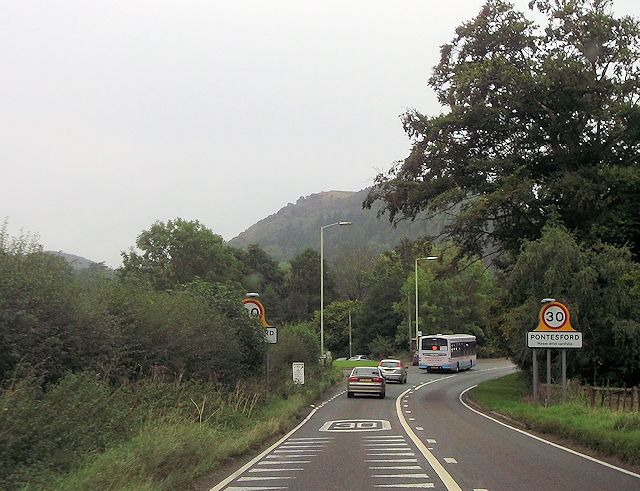
- Entering Pontesford on the A488

- Location within Shropshire
- OS grid reference: SJ408065
- Civil parish: Pontesbury
- Unitary authority: Shropshire
- Ceremonial county: Shropshire
- Region: West Midlands
- Country: England
- Sovereign state: United Kingdom
- Post town: SHREWSBURY
- Postcode district: SY5
- Dialling code: 01743
- Police: West Mercia
- Fire: Shropshire
- Ambulance: West Midlands
- UK Parliament: Shrewsbury and Atcham

Pontesford is a small village in Shropshire, England.

It is located on the A488 outside the large village of Pontesbury, southwest of Shrewsbury. The population as taken at the 2011 census can be found under Pontesbury.

It approximates to the northern extremity of the Pontesford-Linley geological fault, which trends approximately 11 miles to Linley near Bishops Castle. On 2 April 1990, the Pontesford-Linley Fault - registered an earthquake with a magnitude of 5.1 on the Richter scale, known as the Bishop's Castle earthquake. Coal was mined there in the 19th century.

== Pontesford Hill ==
To its south is Pontesford Hill, which adjoins the foot of Earl's Hill, the latter property of the Shropshire Wildlife Trust. Pontesford Hill was property of the Forestry Commission until it was sold to a private owner, Simon Hutchen, in 2010. Hutchen challenged a claim for two footpaths to be added to the definitive map as public rights of way, arguing that they were 'permissive' and not 'as of right'. The claim was referred to the Secretary of State and the subject of a Public Inquiry. Hutchen also applied for planning permission from Shropshire Council to build a replica Iron Age fort round house and amphitheatre and create a green burial ground. Both were voluntarily withdrawn by Hutchen and he agreed to sell the hill to a local campaign group. He sold the hill, which was bought in 2015 by the Shropshire Wildlife Trust with the help of more than £250,000 raised by the group called the Friends of Pontesford Hill to purchase the hill for public use.

== Pontesford Rocks ==
Pontesford Rocks, on the west flank of Earl's Hill, are composed of rhyolites which are Uriconian in age. The rocks have been used since the 1930s for traditional rock climbing and bouldering and are well suited for beginners. There are no sport climbing routes on the rocks. The length of the climbs range from 15 to 60 m (49 to 197 ft).

== See also ==
- Listed buildings in Pontesbury
