= Longden =

Village in Shropshire, England

Coordinates: 52.652°N 2.827°W

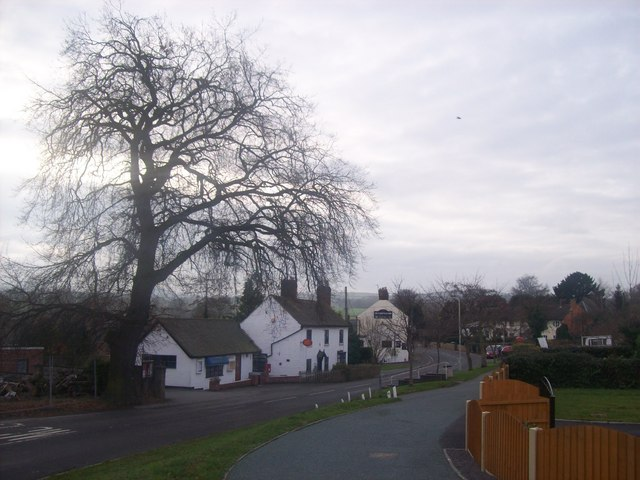
- Longden, Shropshire. Village post office foreground, Tankerville Arms pub centre. Across road from latter (right) gateway to village church.

- Location within Shropshire
- Population: 1,266 (2011)
- OS grid reference: SJ440063
- Civil parish: Longden
- Unitary authority: Shropshire
- Ceremonial county: Shropshire
- Region: West Midlands
- Country: England
- Sovereign state: United Kingdom
- Post town: SHREWSBURY
- Postcode district: SY5
- Dialling code: 01743
- Police: West Mercia
- Fire: Shropshire
- Ambulance: West Midlands
- UK Parliament: Shrewsbury

Longden is a village and civil parish in Shropshire, England. It is located 5 miles (8 km) southwest of Shrewsbury.

== Longden village ==
There is a public house (the Tankerville Arms) and a community-run shop, along with a church, and a primary school. The population of the civil parish at the 2011 census was 1,266. It also has a village hall with a recreational field, children's play park and a private tennis club. According to mid-2007 population estimates, the parish had a population of 1,325.

In the south end of the village is hexagonal brick gazebo, built about 1870, in the garden wall of Hall Farmhouse.

=== Church and chapel ===
The Church of England church of St Ruthen (name sometimes believed to be a corruption of Swithun) was originally built before 1569 as a chapel to the parish church at Pontesbury. (Longden was part of that parish until it became an ecclesiastical parish in its own right in 1935; in 1955 Longden benefice amalgamated with neighbouring Annscroft.) The nave, of mixed red and yellow sandstone rubble, has a moulded plinth believed to be of mediaeval origin, and a blocked south doorway probably early 17th century. A polygonal apse chancel was added in the 18th century, which was restored 1877 and given north and south windows in 1938, while the west porch and vestry were added in 1852-53. It contains a late 17th-century plain wooden pulpit and a marble baluster shaped font, originally made for Pontesbury parish church in 1829, brought here in 1864. The oak lych-gate of the churchyard is the village's war memorial, erected after World War I. The churchyard contains the war graves of two British Army soldiers of World War II.

There was formerly a Methodist chapel at the north end of the village, built in 1870, which closed in the 1990s and is now part of a private house.

== Longden Common ==
Longden Common lies to the south of the village. It had a Congregationalist chapel, built in 1836, which closed in 1967, when some of its pews were given to Longden Methodist chapel. The hamlet's main social focal point is a public house, The Red Lion.

== Governance ==
An electoral ward of Shropshire Council in the same name exists. This ward stretches north to Ford with a total ward population at the 2011 census of 3,967. Longden is represented within the Shrewsbury parliamentary constituency.

== See also ==
- Listed buildings in Longden
