= Habberley, Shropshire =

Village in Shropshire, England

Coordinates: 52.626°N 2.890°W

Habberley
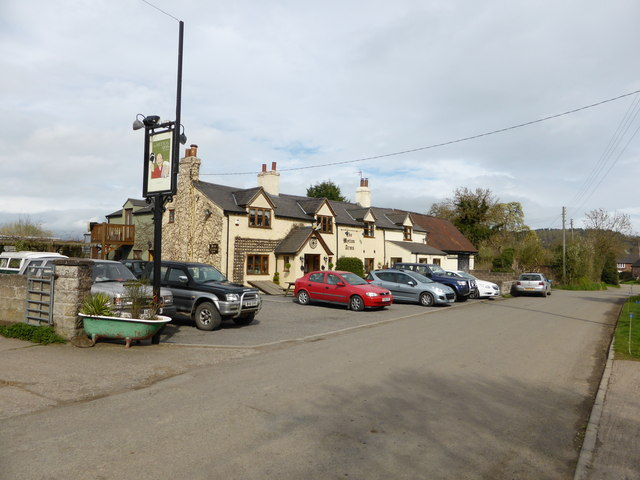
- The Mytton Arms public house, Habberley

- Location within Shropshire
- OS grid reference: SJ398035
- Civil parish: Pontesbury
- Unitary authority: Shropshire
- Ceremonial county: Shropshire
- Region: West Midlands
- Country: England
- Sovereign state: United Kingdom
- Post town: SHREWSBURY
- Postcode district: SY5
- Dialling code: 01743
- Police: West Mercia
- Fire: Shropshire
- Ambulance: West Midlands
- UK Parliament: Shrewsbury and Atcham

Habberley is a small village and former civil parish, now in the parish of Pontesbury, in the Shropshire district, in the ceremonial county of Shropshire, England.

Habberley lies near the Stiperstones southwest of the town of Shrewsbury.

Formerly a small (325 acres (132 ha)) civil parish in its own right Habberley was merged in to the Pontesbury civil parish on 1 April 1967. Its main amenities are a small Anglican church (St Mary's), a public house (The Mytton Arms), and village hall.

In 1824 its population was recorded as 151 - by 1961 this had declined to 66 but residential development such as the conversion of redundant farm buildings has seen it rise again to about 100 residents in 2012. Mary Webb, the romantic novelist, called the place and surrounding district 'Bitterley' in her 1916 novel The Golden Arrow.

== See also ==
- Listed buildings in Pontesbury
