= Pontesbury =

Village in Shropshire, England

Coordinates: 52.649°N 2.888°W

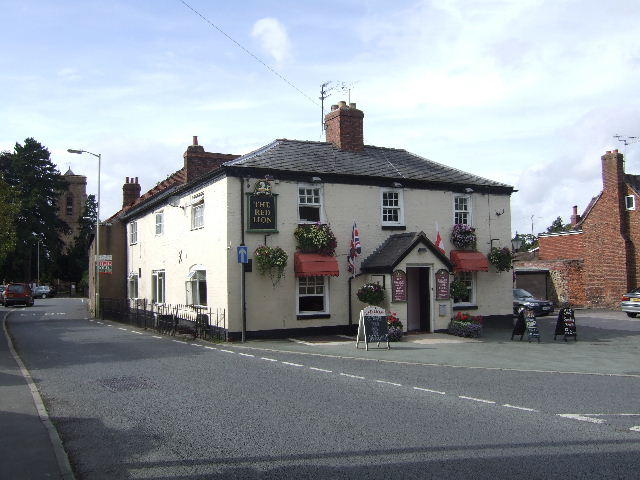
- The Red Lion Pub in 2007, before it became offices. In the background at left can be seen the tower of Pontesbury Parish Church.

- Location within Shropshire
- Population: 1,873 (2011)
- OS grid reference: SJ397061
- Civil parish: Pontesbury
- Unitary authority: Shropshire
- Ceremonial county: Shropshire
- Region: West Midlands
- Country: England
- Sovereign state: United Kingdom
- Post town: SHREWSBURY
- Postcode district: SY5
- Dialling code: 01743
- Police: West Mercia
- Fire: Shropshire
- Ambulance: West Midlands
- UK Parliament: Shrewsbury

Pontesbury (/pɒntsbəri/ PONTS-bər-ee) is a village and civil parish in Shropshire, and is approximately eight miles southwest of Shrewsbury. In the 2011 census, the village had a population of 1,873 and the parish had a population of 3,227. The village of Minsterley is just over a mile further southwest. The A488 road runs through the village, on its way from Shrewsbury to Bishop's Castle. The Rea Brook flows close by to the north with the village itself nestling on the northern edge of the Shropshire Hills AONB. Shropshire Council in their 2015 Place Plan detail the development strategy and refer to Pontesbury and neighbouring Minsterley as towns.

== Local government ==
The village is the seat of an extensive civil parish, with its own parish council grouped into five wards, representing the village and outlying areas such as the villages and hamlets of Pontesford, Plealey, Asterley, Cruckton, Cruckmeole, Arscott, Lea Cross, Malehurst etc., as well as Habberley (which was previously a civil parish in its own right until 1967). It hosts an official Pontesbury Parish website.

It is represented on the unitary Shropshire Council and in parliament in the Shrewsbury constituency.

== Housing development ==
Several housing developments are reshaping the village, with 86 new homes named Cricketer's Meadow, being added at Hall Bank, and 25 homes named Young's Piece, built on the site of a former lead smelting area on Minsterley Road. Soil samples taken at the site of Young's Piece during the planning application process (since removed) showed lead contamination was in excess of the applicable threshold level/critical concentration. The area was identified as requiring a £1.5M spend to remove lead and arsenic pollution from the ground. An application for outline planning permission has been granted for demolition of The Horseshoes Pub on Minsterley Road to make way for the erection of four houses. The pub occupies the site of an historic lead smelting works and according to the application was designated contaminated land in 2007. An application for 18 houses has been granted off Mount Close. A planning application was submitted in January 2021 for the development of 38 new houses on land opposite the Horseshoes Pub, to be known as Lawrence Park. This application has been granted, having previously been withdrawn and then resubmitted. An environmental geology report found lead concentrations, 'significantly in exceedance of the Generic Acceptance Criterion'. On 25 August 2022 workers on the Shropshire Homes development uncovered 24 World War II bombs that had previously been safely beneath the plough soil. Because fears that more bombs may remain, work on the site has been halted. The site is listed in the Defence of Britain archive as a defensive location for the 4th Salop Home Guard as a place to attack tanks. These strategic sites often had munitions associated with them. A further application has been made, referred to as phase two, to build an additional four houses on the land between Young's Piece and Lawrence Park. No provision will be made for affordable housing, 'due to significant costs associated with the remediation of contamination'. The land, along with Young's Piece and Lawrence Park, formed part of a nineteenth century lead smelting works, resulting in contamination.

== Climate Change ==
Pontesbury Climate Emergency Action Group was set up in 2020 with the aim of achieving net zero carbon by 2030. Areas currently being focused on include local food and community growing, increasing biodiversity, and encouraging people to use carbon footprint tools to raise awareness. The Parish Council has stated that one of the largest sources of carbon emissions for the council is the new community hub, which was built as part of the Hall Bank development by Shropshire Homes. The community hub relocated the library and police station from elsewhere in the village. The Parish Council are now exploring how to reduce its impact.

== Education ==
The village is home of a comprehensive school, the Mary Webb School and Science College, named after the local novelist Mary Webb, which serves most of the surrounding villages for pupils age 11–16, on whose premises is the Mary Webb Sports Centre, usable by the public out of school hours. There is also a primary school, on whose premises also meet a pre-school playgroup formed 1990. There is also a nursery school, for children aged 3 months to 4 years, called The Ark, on Hall Bank.

== Other public amenities and services ==
Pontesbury is one of the largest villages in Shropshire and so is host to a wide range of local services including independent local shops selling local produce and two public houses ('The Nag's Head' and 'The Plough')

The village also contains a medical practice, dental surgery, post office, police station (under F Division, West Mercia Police), public library, public hall and cemetery.

== Industries and trade ==
The village has a long mining history, once linked to Snailbeach and Hanwood via the Minsterley branch line and the Snailbeach District Railways, it supplied local industry with coal, lead, iron and stone. Although the railway tracks are no longer there, the route that it took can still be walked, where some former stations and sidings remain. Nearby Poles Coppice, around half-a-mile south of the village, contains two former quarries and is now a countryside recreation area.

== Churches ==
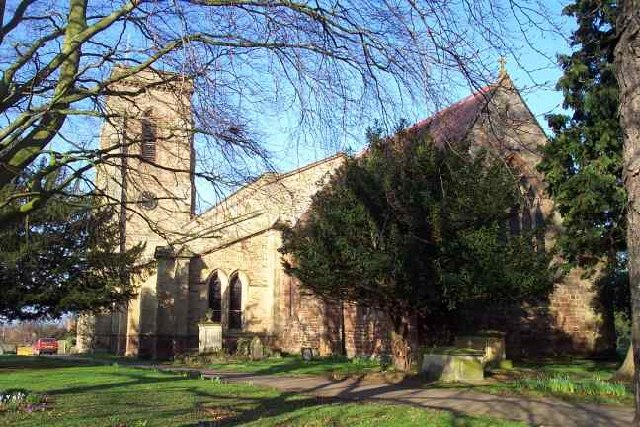
St. George's Church, Pontesbury.

In the centre of the village sits St George's Church of England parish church, the origins of which can be traced to about 1250 AD but due to the site's circular graveyard shape may indicate a much more ancient site of Anglo Saxon or even Celtic origin. The church itself however was largely restored in the 19th century, following the collapse of the mediaeval tower between 1820 and 1825.

The churchyard contains the outdoor parish war memorial. The present Portland stone cross, erected 1963, replaced an earlier elaborate cross by Temple Moore and unveiled in 1921, which bore a crucifix and images of the Virgin Mary, Mary Magdalene and St George and the Dragon but had become dilapidated and was dismantled in 1960.

There are also active Baptist, Methodist and Congregationalist Churches. The Salvation Army had a barracks in Pontesbury between about 1888–1894.

== Hill ==
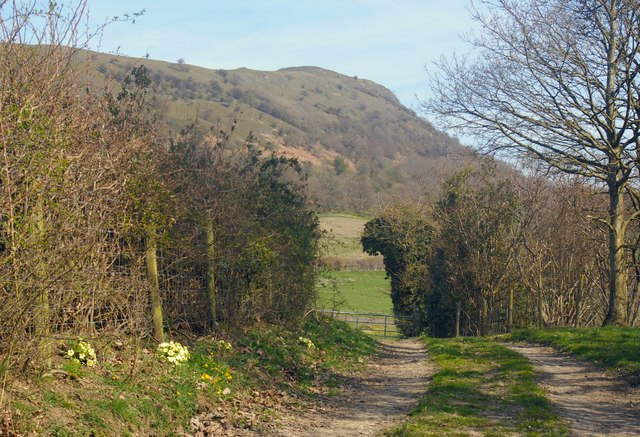
Earl's Hill

Nearby is Earl's Hill, which is the site of an Iron Age hillfort built around 600 B.C. and making it a Scheduled Ancient Monument and also designated an SSSI (Site of Special Scientific Interest) for its wildlife value. It was Shropshire Wildlife Trust's first nature reserve in 1964. Earl's Hill is PreCambrian in origin, being formed approximately 650 million years ago as a result of volcanic activity along the Pontesford-Linley fault.

== Sports ==
Local sports clubs include:

- Pontesbury Cricket Club, formed 1875; has 3 hardball teams in Shropshire County Cricket League and one in Shrewsbury Cricket League.
- Pontesbury Bowling Club, formed 1925, both crown green bowls (ground at Nag's Head: has 3 teams in Wem League and 5 teams in Tanners League) and short mat indoor bowling (meets at Pontesbury Public Hall).
- Pontesbury Football Club, reformed 1987 – plays in Premier Division of the Shrewsbury and District Sunday League.
- Pontesbury Badminton Club, formed 1990.

== Notable people ==
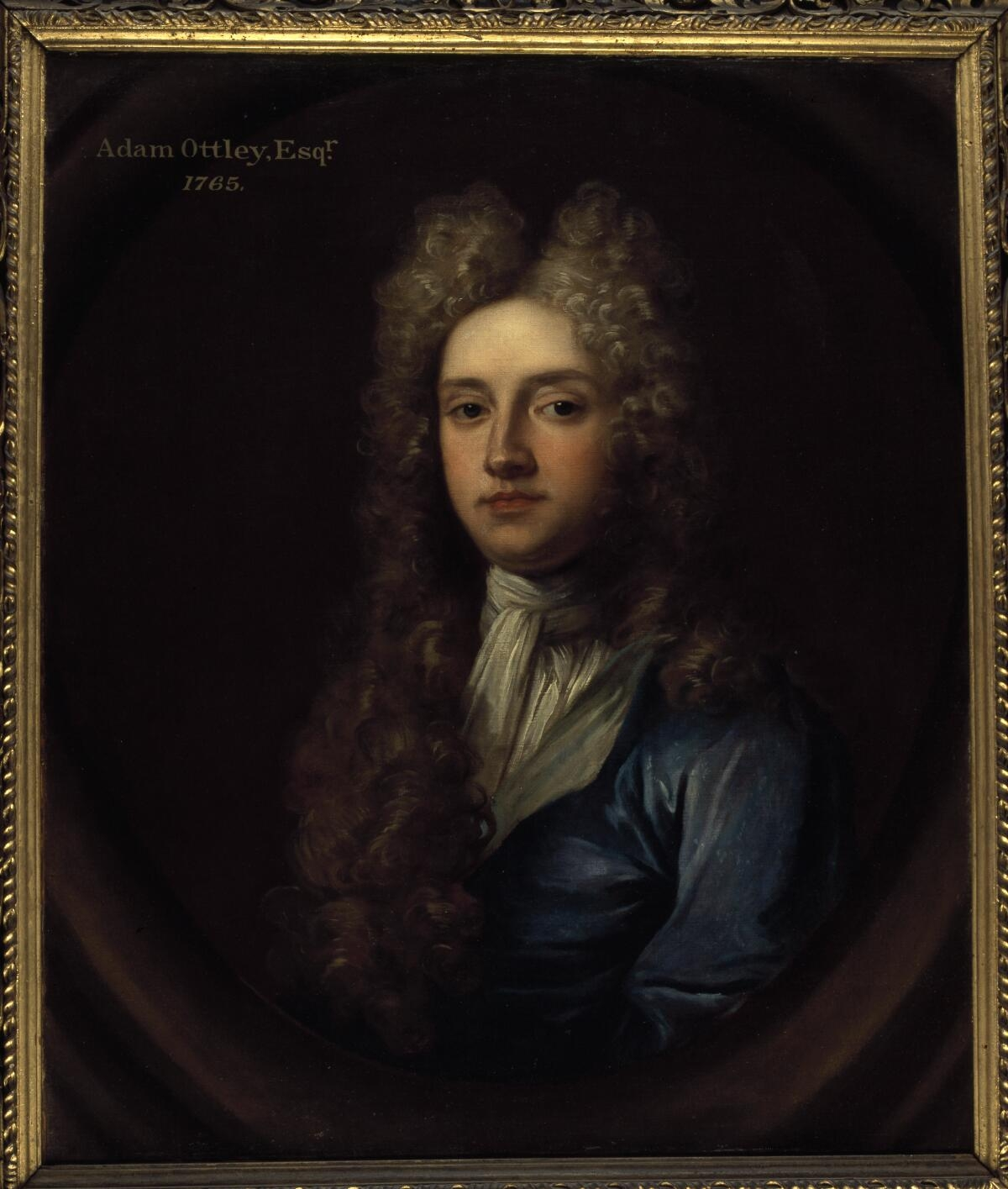
Adam Ottley, 1765

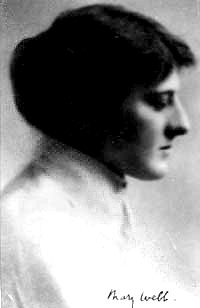
Mary Webb, ca.1915

- Richard Grey, 3rd Earl of Tankerville (1436–1466), 8th Lord of Powys born locally.
- Edward Corbet (ca. 1603-1658) English clergyman, born at Pontesbury; member of the Westminster Assembly.
- Adam Ottley (1655–1723) an English churchman, rector of Pontesbury, prebendary of Hereford Cathedral, Archdeacon of Shropshire and Bishop of St Davids from 1713.
- William J. Oliver (?1774-1827) also known as Oliver the Spy, was a police informer and supposed agent provocateur at a time of social unrest, immediately after the Napoleonic Wars; said to be from Pontesbury.
- John Esmonde (1862–1915), surgeon and later an Irish Nationalist politician, lived at Ingleside, Pontesbury.
- Mary Webb (1881–1927), poet and author of Precious Bane, The Golden Arrow and Gone to Earth, she lived in Pontesbury between 1914 and 1916 when The Golden Arrow was published.
- D. H. Lawrence (1885–1930) visited Pontesbury in 1924 and it later appeared in his novella St Mawr.
- Lily Chitty (1893–1979), archaeologist, lived locally from 1943 and is buried in the Pontesbury Cemetery.
- David Edwards (born 1986) footballer, played over 560 games, incl. 284 at Wolves and 43 for Wales; attended school in the village, and still lives there.

== See also ==
- Listed buildings in Pontesbury
- Snailbeach District Railways
- Snailbeach Countryside Site
- Pontesford
- Poles Coppice countryside site
- Geology of Shropshire
