= Edgebold =

Hamlet in Shropshire, England

Coordinates: 52.690°N 2.802°W

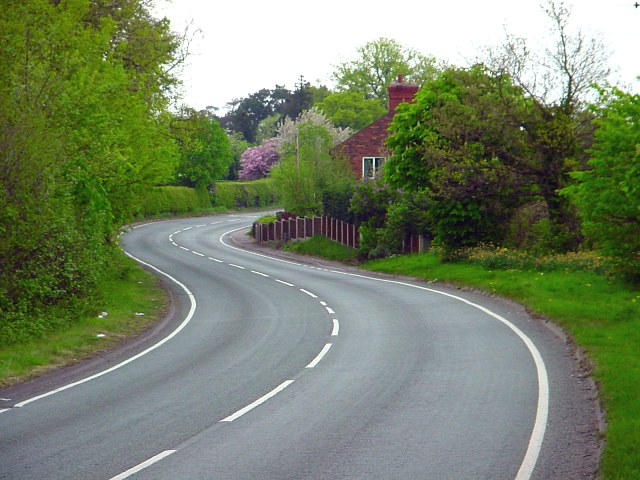
- A488 passing through Edgebold

- Location within Shropshire
- OS grid reference: SJ457105
- Civil parish: Great Hanwood
- Unitary authority: Shropshire
- Ceremonial county: Shropshire
- Region: West Midlands
- Country: England
- Sovereign state: United Kingdom
- Post town: SHREWSBURY
- Postcode district: SY5
- Dialling code: 01743
- Police: West Mercia
- Fire: Shropshire
- Ambulance: West Midlands
- UK Parliament: Shrewsbury and Atcham

Edgebold is a dispersed hamlet on the western edge of Shrewsbury in Shropshire, England. It is on the A488 Shrewsbury to Bishop's Castle road.

== History ==
It was described in 1897 as consisting chiefly of two farmhouses: Upper Edgebold and Lower Edgebold. Upper Edgebold is a grade II listed building, probably early seventeenth century with later additions, and moated to the north and west.

Edgebold appears in the Domesday Book as Edbaldinesham. This suggests the name of the original Saxon settler could have been 'Edbalding'; with 'ing' being a Saxon termina of descent, he may have been the son of an Edbald or Ethelbald.

Thieves' Lane, an ancient lane labelled on OS maps as a Roman road, ran through this area. Sections remain as footpaths, farm tracks and hedge-lines between Mousecroft Lane on the outskirts of Shrewsbury, through Edgebold and out to where it joins the modern day B4386 Shrewsbury to Montgomery road at Cruckton.

There was formerly a brick works at Edgebold, situated on the south side of the main road approximately 200m west from the junction with Nobold Lane. It appears as an active concern on the OS map of the early 1900s.

Edgebold had a railway station (named Edgebold) on the now-disused Shropshire and Montgomeryshire Railway. The station was located on the south side of the bridge by which the line crossed the main road, between Lower Edgebold and Hanwood Bank. The same station had previously been open under the name Hanwood Road, during the line's previous incarnation as the Potteries, Shrewsbury and North Wales Railway. On the site of that station, in 1938, was built the Hanwood Dairy plant that prepared and bottled milk for delivery until it closed in February 1990.

During the Second World War, two German landmines were dropped at Lower Edgebold on 20 November 1940.

== Geography ==
Upper Edgebold and Lower Edgebold are now divided by the A5 Shrewsbury by-pass, which opened on 11 August 1992 and which is connected to the A488 by the Edgebold roundabout. This roundabout underwent road widening in 2014; further alterations to the road layout were made shortly after to ease a congestion issue.

After Edgebold, the next settlement out of Shrewsbury along the A488 is Hanwood Bank at the north end of Hanwood.

== See also ==
- Nobold
