= Maesbrook =

Village in Shropshire, England

Coordinates: 52.786°N 3.029°W

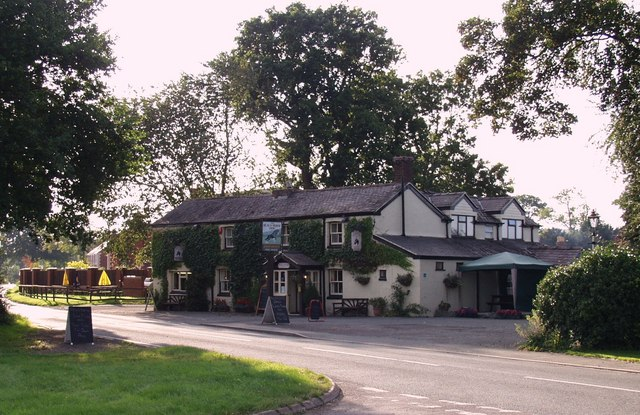
- The Black Horse Inn public house, Maesbrook

- Location within Shropshire
- Population: (See Kinnerley)
- OS grid reference: SJ305215
- Civil parish: Kinnerley
- Unitary authority: Shropshire
- Ceremonial county: Shropshire
- Region: West Midlands
- Country: England
- Sovereign state: United Kingdom
- Post town: Oswestry
- Postcode district: SY10
- Dialling code: 01691
- Police: West Mercia
- Fire: Shropshire
- Ambulance: West Midlands
- UK Parliament: North Shropshire

Maesbrook /ˈmeɪsbrʊk/ is a village in Shropshire, England. Maesbury and Maesbury Marsh are about a mile north of Maesbrook. Pant is also nearby, just north of Llanymynech.

It lies between the villages of Llanymynech and Knockin, south of the town of Oswestry. The A5 road is nearby, as is the border with Wales.

== History ==
=== Railway ===
Maesbrook railway station was on the defunct Shropshire and Montgomeryshire Railway, a branch line running from Shrewsbury, England to Llanymynech, Wales. It opened in 1911, becoming one of the Colonel Stephens Railways.

In 1933 passenger services were suspended. The railway was taken over by the War Department at the outbreak of World War II when a top-secret armaments storage centre was built at Kinnerley. The line remained in military ownership until it was closed in 1960. Notes on wartime role

=== Osbaston House killings ===
In August 2008 the village came to national prominence after multi-millionaire businessman Christopher Foster shot dead his family before killing himself in a fire at their £1.2 million home. A two-day inquest held in April 2009 heard that Foster had given no indication of what he was going to do. His 15-year-old daughter Kirstie had chatted with friends via social media until around midnight before she said her father had told her to go to bed. At some point, Foster used his legally-owned rifle to kill his wife, Jill, and daughter. CCTV footage captured him outside shooting the family's horses and dogs, as well as the tyres on his vehicles; he blocked the entrance to his property with a horse transporter. Foster then set alight the house, garage and stables with heating oil. He returned to his wife's body in an apparent act of self-immolation.

Earlier that evening, the family had attended a friend's barbecue party. Guests told police that there was nothing suspicious in Foster's manner or behaviour to suggest what he planned. An expert witness believed Foster killed his family because his businesses were in severe financial trouble and he wanted to "protect" them from poverty.
