= Llandrinio Road railway station =

Former railway station in Wales

Llandrinio Road

General information
- Location: Northeast of Criggion, Powys; Wales
- Coordinates: 52.7348°N 3.0263°W
- Grid reference: SJ307157
- Platforms: 1

Other information
- Status: Disused

History
- Original company: Potteries, Shrewsbury and North Wales Railway
- Pre-grouping: Shropshire and Montgomeryshire Railway
- Post-grouping: Shropshire and Montgomeryshire Railway

Key dates
- 21 June 1871: Opened
- 3 October 1932: Closed
Location

Llandrinio Road railway station was a station to the northeast of Criggion, Powys, Wales. The station opened in 1871 and closed in 1932. The station was sited a mile to the south east of Llandrinio at Criggion Bridge on the road to Crew Green hence the "Road" suffix. There was a single brick platform on the west side of the road level crossing with a goods siding on the north side of the line.

Preceding station	Disused railways	Following station
Criggion; Line and station closed	Shropshire and Montgomeryshire Railway; Potteries, Shrewsbury and North Wales Railway	Crew Green; Line and station closed
