= Chapel Lane railway station =

Former railway station in Shropshire, England

Chapel Lane

General information
- Location: North of Melverley, Shropshire; England
- Coordinates: 52.7579°N 2.9924°W
- Grid reference: SJ332182

Other information
- Status: Disused

History
- Original company: Shropshire and Montgomeryshire Railway
- Post-grouping: Shropshire and Montgomeryshire Railway

Key dates
- 1920: Opened
- 6 November 1933: Closed
Location

Chapel Lane railway station was a station to the north of Melverley, Shropshire, England. The station was opened in 1920 and closed in 1933.

Preceding station	Disused railways	Following station
Kinnerley Junction; Line and station closed	Shropshire and Montgomeryshire Railway; Potteries, Shrewsbury and North Wales Railway	Melverley; Line and station closed
