= Redhill =

Redhill may refer to:

== Places ==
=== United Kingdom ===
- Redhill, Aberdeenshire, Scotland
- Redhill, Bournemouth, Dorset
- Redhill, Herefordshire
- Redhill, Nottinghamshire
- Redhill, Hook-a-Gate, Shropshire
- Redhill, Shropshire
- Redhill, Somerset
- Redhill, Staffordshire
- Redhill, Surrey
- Red Hill, Worcester

=== Other places ===
- Redhill, South Australia, Australia
- Hundred of Redhill, Australia
- Red Hill, New Zealand
- Bukit Merah, Singapore (also known as Redhill)
- Red Hill, North Carolina, United States

== Other uses ==
- Redhill Aerodrome
- Redhill F.C., an English football club
- Redhill MRT station
- Redhill railway station
- Michael Redhill (born 1966), Canadian poet, playwright and novelist

== See also ==
- Red Hill (disambiguation)
- Red Hills (disambiguation)
- Redhills (disambiguation)
- Redhill School (disambiguation)
- Redhill station (disambiguation)
