= Criggion railway station =

Former railway station in Wales

Criggion

General information
- Location: Criggion, Powys; Wales
- Coordinates: 52.7287°N 3.0439°W
- Grid reference: SJ295151

Other information
- Status: Disused

History
- Original company: Potteries, Shrewsbury and North Wales Railway
- Pre-grouping: Shropshire and Montgomeryshire Railway
- Post-grouping: Shropshire and Montgomeryshire Railway

Key dates
- 21 June 1871: Opened
- 3 October 1932: Closed
Location

Criggion railway station was a station in Criggion, Powys, Wales. The station opened in 1871 and closed in 1932. The station house now forms two private residences.

Preceding station	Disused railways	Following station
Terminus	Shropshire and Montgomeryshire Railway; Potteries, Shrewsbury and North Wales Railway	Llandrinio Road; Line and station closed
