= Nobold =

Hamlet in Shropshire, England

Coordinates: 52.687°N 2.779°W

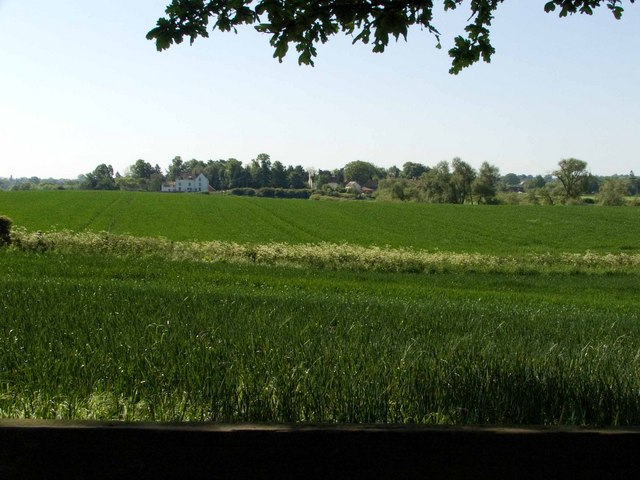
- Nobold

- Location within Shropshire
- OS grid reference: SJ473102
- Civil parish: Great Hanwood; Shrewsbury
- Unitary authority: Shropshire
- Ceremonial county: Shropshire
- Region: West Midlands
- Country: England
- Sovereign state: United Kingdom
- Post town: SHREWSBURY
- Postcode district: SY5
- Dialling code: 01743
- Police: West Mercia
- Fire: Shropshire
- Ambulance: West Midlands
- UK Parliament: Shrewsbury and Atcham

Nobold is a hamlet on the south-western edge of Shrewsbury in Shropshire, England. It is located on the Shrewsbury to Longden road. Nobold boasts Shropshire's oldest natural water well.

Nearby are Meole Brace and Hook-a-Gate villages.

== See also ==
- Edgebold
