= Crew Green railway station =

Disused railway station in Wales

Crew Green

General information
- Location: East of Criggion, Powys; Wales
- Coordinates: 52.7352°N 2.9993°W
- Grid reference: SJ325157

Other information
- Status: Disused

History
- Original company: Potteries, Shrewsbury and North Wales Railway
- Pre-grouping: Shropshire and Montgomeryshire Railway
- Post-grouping: Shropshire and Montgomeryshire Railway

Key dates
- 21 June 1871: Opened as Crewe Green
- 1920: Name changed to Crew Green
- 3 October 1932: Closed
Location

Crew Green railway station was a station to the east of Criggion, Powys, Wales. The station opened in 1871 and closed in 1932.

Preceding station	Disused railways	Following station
Llandrinio Road; Line and station closed	Shropshire and Montgomeryshire Railway; Potteries, Shrewsbury and North Wales Railway	Melverley; Line and station closed
