= Maesbrook railway station =

Former railway station in England

Maesbrook

General information
- Location: Maesbrook, Shropshire; England
- Coordinates: 52.7800°N 3.0373°W
- Grid reference: SJ302207

Other information
- Status: Disused

History
- Original company: Potteries, Shrewsbury and North Wales Railway
- Pre-grouping: Shropshire and Montgomeryshire Railway
- Post-grouping: Shropshire and Montgomeryshire Railway

Key dates
- 13 August 1866: Station opened
- 21 December 1866: Closed
- December 1868: Reopened
- 22 June 1880: Closed
- 14 April 1911: Reopened by S&MR
- 6 November 1933: Closed for public services
Location

Maesbrook railway station was a station in Maesbrook, Shropshire, England. The station was opened in 1866 and closed in 1933.

Preceding station	Disused railways	Following station
Llanymynech; Line and station closed	Shropshire and Montgomeryshire Railway; Potteries, Shrewsbury and North Wales Railway	Wern Las; Line and station closed
