= Shrawardine railway station =

Former railway station in Shropshire, England

Shrawardine

General information
- Location: Shrawardine, Shropshire; England
- Coordinates: 52.7364°N 2.9062°W
- Grid reference: SJ390158
- Platforms: 1

Other information
- Status: Disused

History
- Original company: Potteries, Shrewsbury and North Wales Railway
- Pre-grouping: Shropshire and Montgomeryshire Railway
- Post-grouping: Shropshire and Montgomeryshire Railway

Key dates
- 13 August 1866: Station opened
- 21 December 1866: Closed
- December 1868: Reopened
- 22 June 1880: Closed
- 14 April 1911: Reopened by S&MR
- 6 November 1933: Closed for public services
Location

Shrawardine railway station was a station in Shrawardine, Shropshire, England. The station was opened in 1866 and closed in 1933.

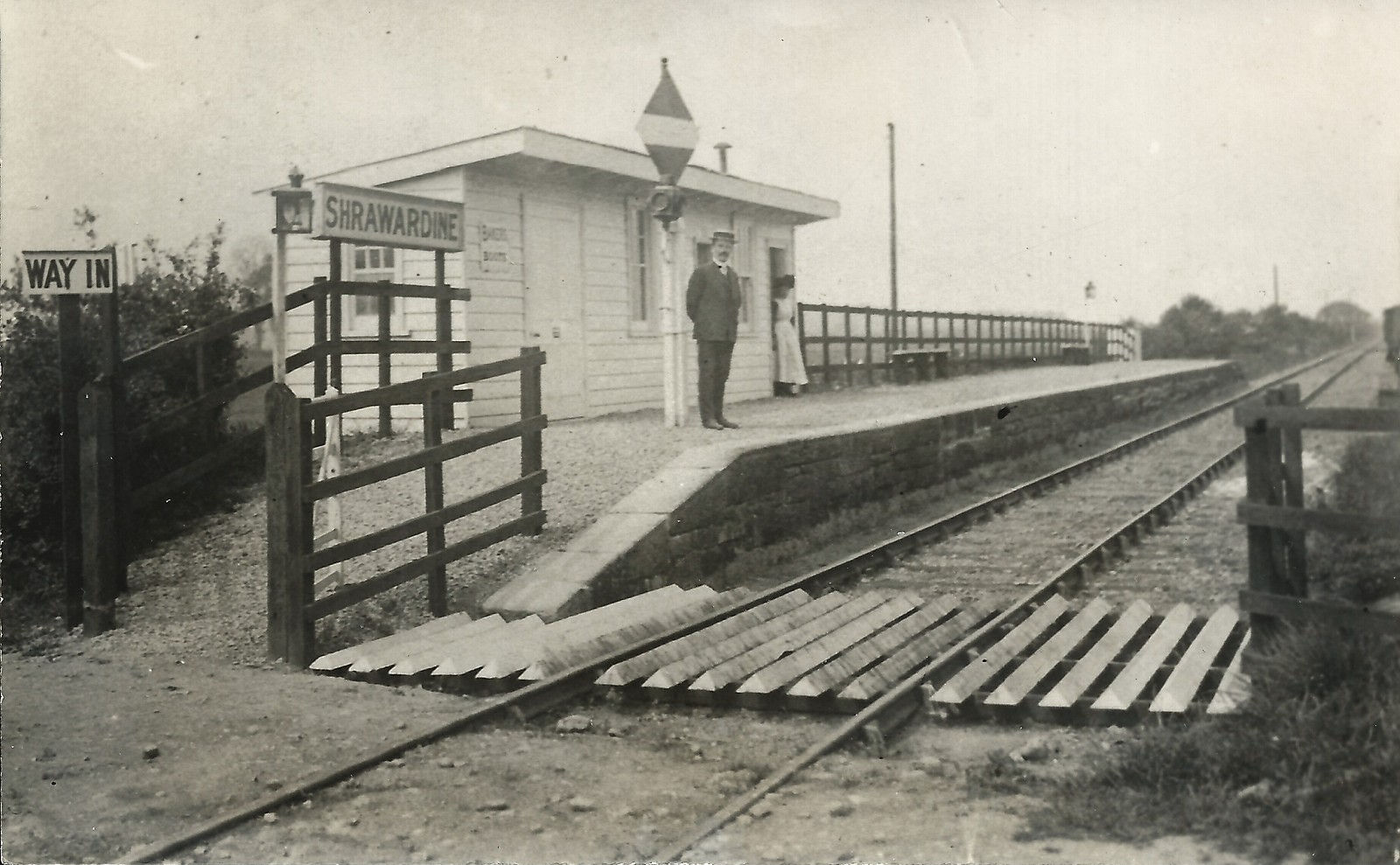
Shrawardine station, as it appeared in 1911

Preceding station	Disused railways	Following station
Nesscliffe and Pentre; Line and station closed	Shropshire and Montgomeryshire Railway; Potteries, Shrewsbury and North Wales Railway	Ford and Crossgates; Line and station closed
