= Nantmawr =

Village in Shropshire, England

Coordinates: 52.811°N 3.117°W

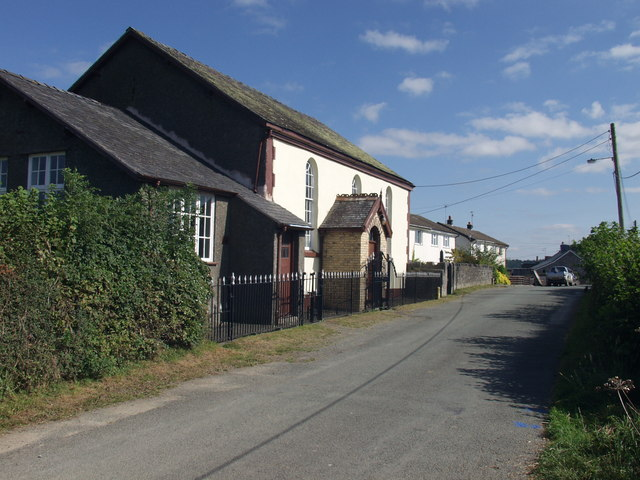
- Wesleyan Chapel, Nantmawr This is not Nantmawr Chapel but Cefnblodwel (approx. 1 mile away)

- Location within Shropshire
- OS grid reference: SJ248244
- Civil parish: Oswestry Rural
- Unitary authority: Shropshire
- Ceremonial county: Shropshire
- Region: West Midlands
- Country: England
- Sovereign state: United Kingdom
- Post town: OSWESTRY
- Postcode district: SY10
- Dialling code: 01691
- Police: West Mercia
- Fire: Shropshire
- Ambulance: West Midlands
- UK Parliament: North Shropshire

Nantmawr is a village in Shropshire, England. It is located about five miles southwest of Oswestry and close to the Welsh border. The Offa's Dyke Path runs through the village.

Like many of the towns in the Welsh Marches, the area was formerly Welsh speaking, and its name means "big stream".

The village also forms the terminus of the surviving stub of the former Potteries, Shrewsbury & North Wales Railway, better known as the 'Potts Line', which is currently being re-opened as a heritage railway by the Tanat Valley Light Railway Company.

Nantmawr has a nature reserve known as "Jones' Rough" managed by Shropshire Wildlife Trust. It is a breeding place for the pearl-bordered fritillary butterfly.
