= Shrewsbury Abbey railway station =

Former railway station in Shropshire, England

Shrewsbury Abbey
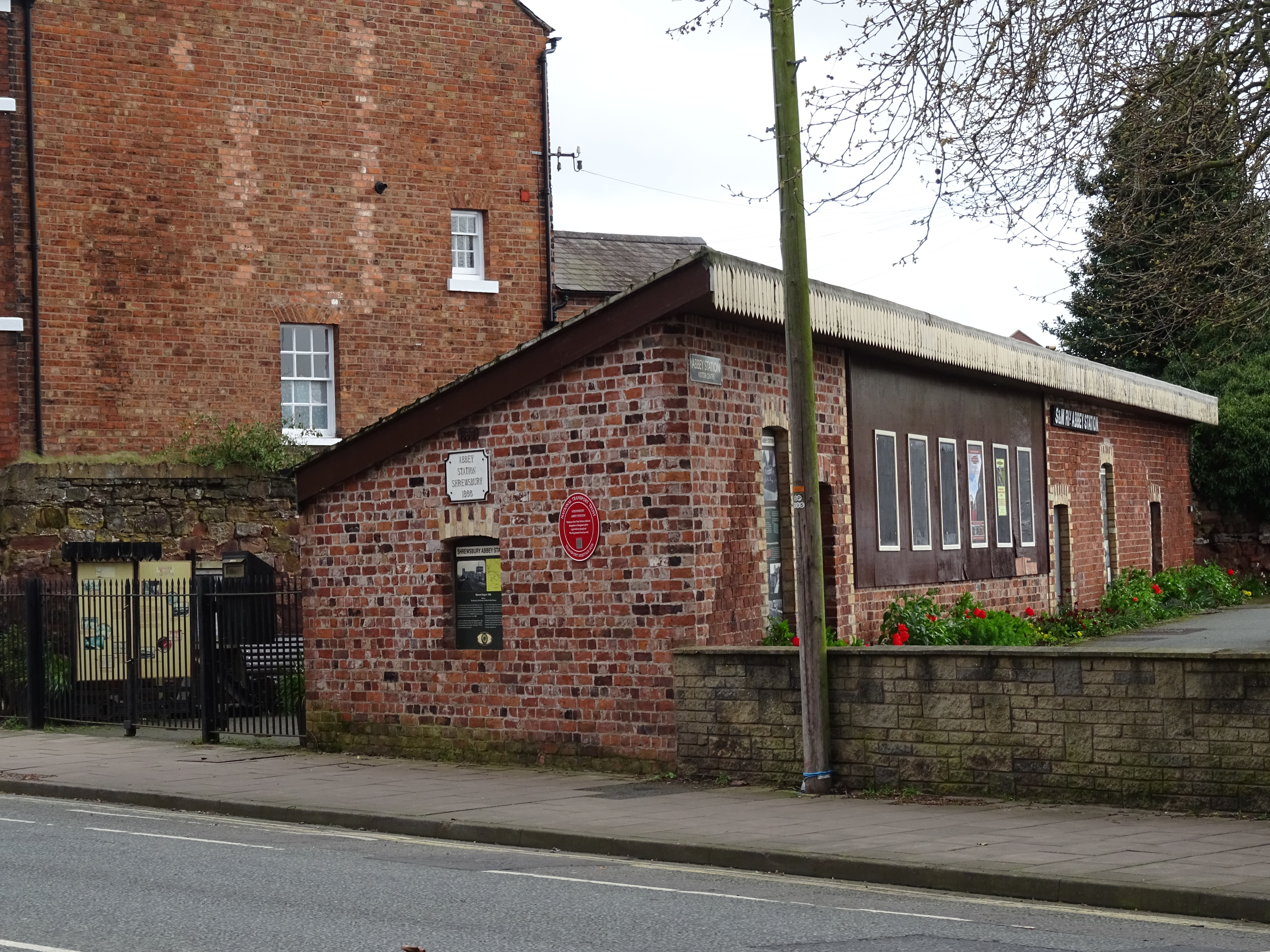
- The station building in April 2024 following restoration

General information
- Location: Shrewsbury, Shropshire; England
- Coordinates: 52.7069°N 2.7435°W
- Grid reference: SJ498123
- Platforms: 1

Other information
- Status: Disused

History
- Original company: Potteries, Shrewsbury and North Wales Railway
- Pre-grouping: Shropshire and Montgomeryshire Railway
- Post-grouping: Shropshire and Montgomeryshire Railway

Key dates
- 13 August 1866: Station opened
- 21 December 1866: Closed
- December 1868: Reopened
- 22 June 1880: Closed
- 14 April 1911: Reopened by S&MR
- 6 November 1933: Closed for public services
- 1941: Reopened (for restricted service) by War Department
- 29 February 1960: Closed completely
Location

Shrewsbury Abbey was a railway station in Shrewsbury, Shropshire, England. It was part of the Shropshire and Montgomeryshire Railway. It was named after Shrewsbury Abbey, to which was virtually adjacent. The station had an adjacent goods yard and wagon building works.

Shrewsbury Abbey was originally planned to be just one station on a railway from Llanymynech to Market Drayton, but when financial problems halted the project, it became the permanent terminus. It was very close to the English Bridge over the River Severn that leads into the centre of Shrewsbury. However, it was never connected to Shrewsbury Station, which had its own links with North Wales, just nine miles to the east, as well as the West Midlands and North West England. All passenger services had to change at the Abbey station. This was because access to the mainline station was rejected on financial grounds and due to the obstruction of Shrewsbury station's joint operators, the Great Western Railway (GWR) and the London and North Western Railway.

== History ==
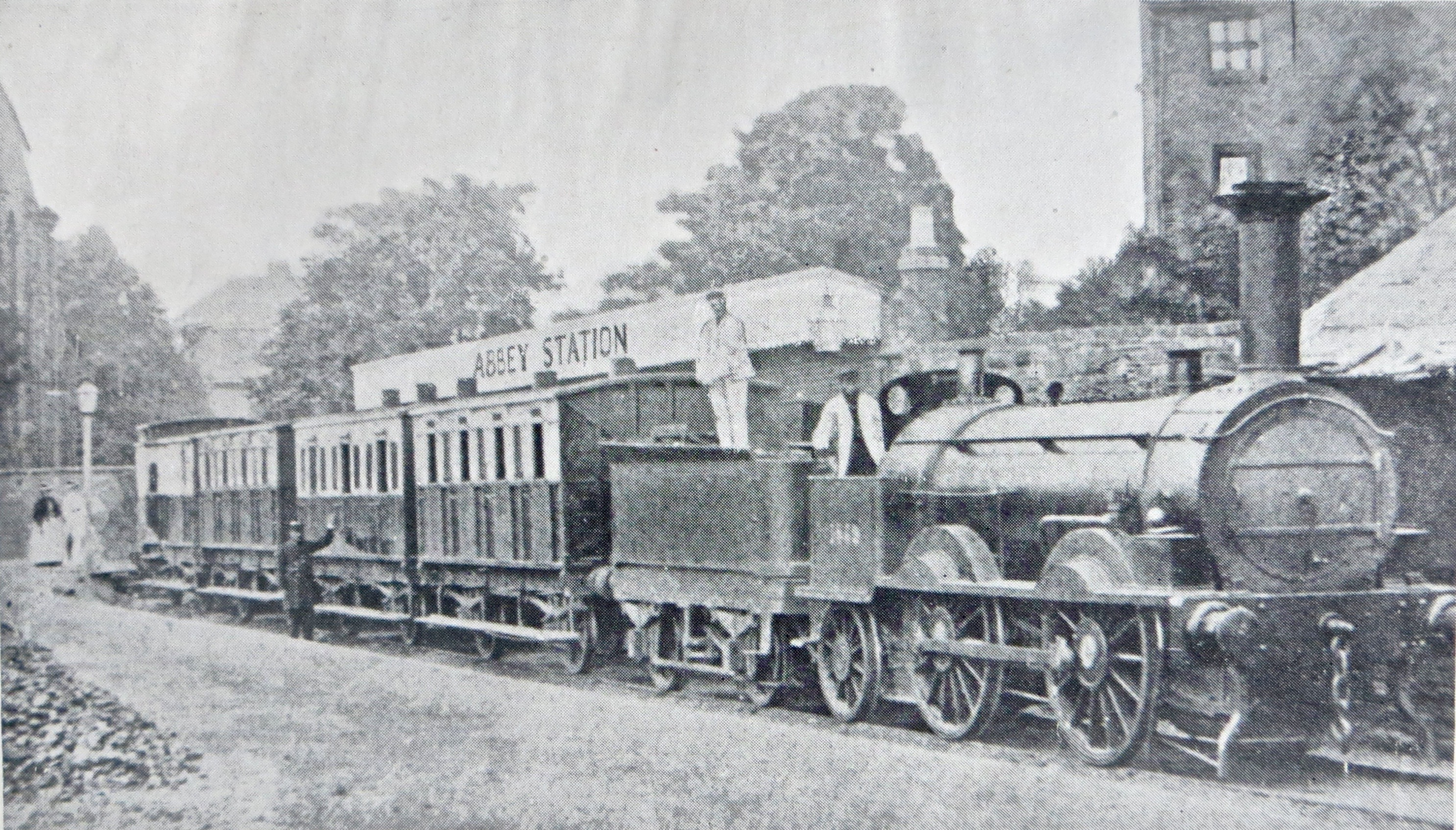
1872-74 'Potts' train at Abbey Station behind a Bury, Curtis and Kennedy 0-4-2 locomotive

Shrewsbury Abbey station opened on 13 August 1866 as the temporary end of the Potteries, Shrewsbury and North Wales Railway (known locally as 'The Potts'). It was built on part of a monastery that had been destroyed during the Reformation. In 1876, a railway carriage and wagon building works of the Midland Wagon Company operated next to the station. It closed in 1912.

When the station became the permanent terminus after financial difficulties caused the abandonment of the planned extension to Market Drayton, it struggled to make money. On 22 June 1880, Shrewsbury Abbey closed for the first time when the railway could no longer continue services; this was a rare example of a railway closure in Britain in the 19th century.

Several attempts were made to reopen the railway. In 1890–91, a start was made on remodelling the station before financial problems again caused work to cease. The station was finally reopened on 13 April 1911 with a rebuilt line now known as the Shropshire and Montgomeryshire Railway. It finally closed to all passengers (except specials) on 6 November 1933.

=== Wartime role ===
At the outbreak of World War II, the Shropshire and Montgomeryshire Light Railway was taken over by the War Department. Shrewsbury Abbey station reopened for military personnel in 1941. The Royal Engineers reconstructed the railway and built a top secret storage explosives depot at Kinnerley. The site was not declassified until the 1950s. The entire railway was closed by the military in 1960. Official closure was on 29 February, connection to the system being maintained by a new link to the Severn Valley Railway.

=== Later use ===
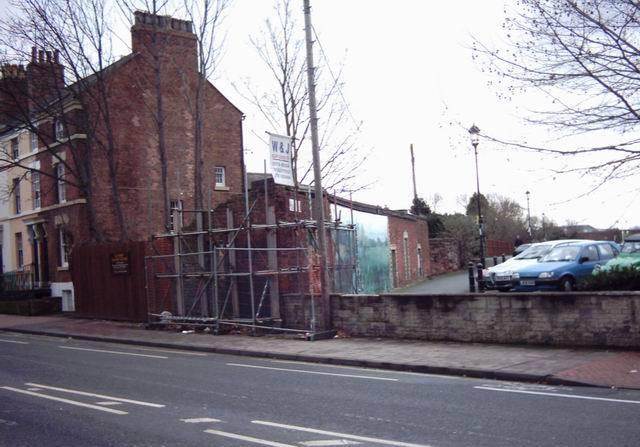
The site of the station in 2005 before restoration

After Shrewsbury Abbey station closed, the goods yard was occupied by an oil depot until its closure on 5 July 1988. The site is now occupied by a surface car park, and the original station building and platform built for the Shropshire and Montgomeryshire were restored in 2005–06. The building now serves as the headquarters of the Shrewsbury Railway Heritage Trust, who open it to the public, hosting an exhibition on Shrewsbury's railway history, on certain days. In 2023, the station received a red wheel plaque from the National Transport Trust commemorating its history as a railway terminus.

== See also ==
- Abbey Foregate railway station - another station, not on Abbey Foregate itself

Preceding station	Disused railways	Following station
Shrewsbury West; Line and station closed	Shropshire and Montgomeryshire Railway; Potteries, Shrewsbury and North Wales Railway	Terminus
