= Potteries, Shrewsbury and North Wales Railway =

United Kingdom railway

The Potteries, Shrewsbury and North Wales Railway, (known informally as the 'Potts'), was a railway built between Shrewsbury, England, and quarry locations at Nantmawr in England and Criggion in Wales. It was initially opened in 1866; despite the extensive title it never reached further than those extremities. It had cost about £1.5 million to construct, but its financial performance was extremely poor, and economies resulted in near-suspension of maintenance, leading to dangerous conditions. The line rapidly became very run down as a result of low revenues and poor maintenance, and was closed at the instigation of the Board of Trade for safety reasons in June 1880. It lay derelict for 30 years but was revived when the Shropshire and Montgomeryshire Railway re-opened it as a light railway in 1911.

== Background ==
By the early 1860s Shrewsbury had become an important railway centre, dominated together by the Great Western Railway and the London and North Western Railway, and the main station was approached by trunk lines controlled by those companies, separately and jointly.

Shrewsbury itself was an important county town, but its hinterland was rural, agricultural and sparsely populated. Nevertheless, it had a strategic importance, in being the gateway to a large tract of land in mid-Wales. Earlier aspirations to form a direct railway route from London through Shrewsbury to a North Wales harbour, enabling a direct packet boat route to Dublin, had been superseded by the Chester and Holyhead Railway, and the development of Holyhead as a ferry port.

== West Shropshire Railway ==
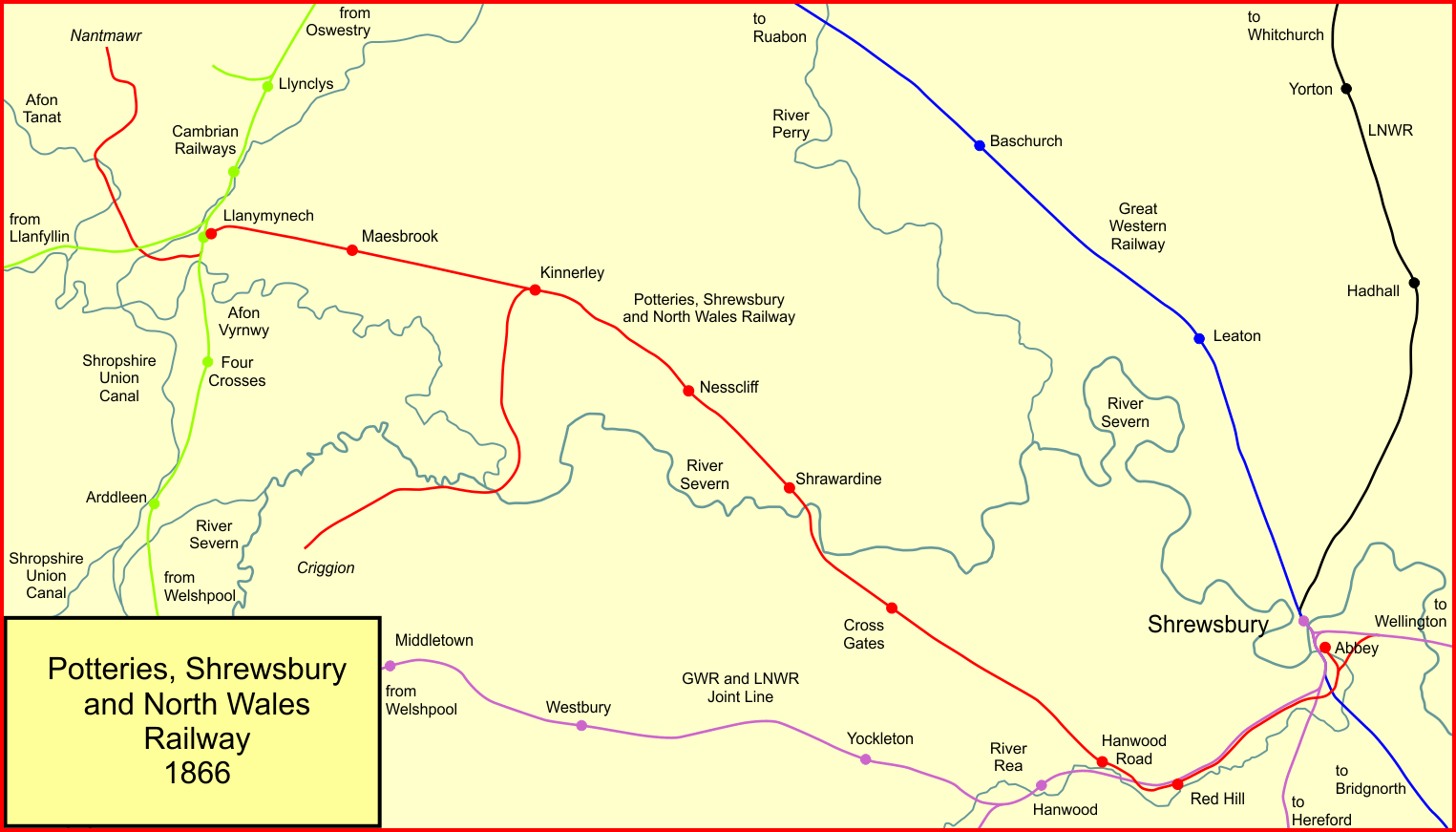
The Potteries, Shrewsbury and North Wales Railway in 1866

West Shropshire Mineral Railway Act 1862
- Act of Parliament
- Parliament of the United Kingdom
- Long title: An Act for making a Railway in the County of Salop, to be called "The West Shropshire Mineral Railway;" and for other Purposes.
- Citation: 25 & 26 Vict. c. clxxxv

Dates
- Royal assent: 29 July 1862

Text of statute as originally enacted

Richard Samuel France was the owner of extensive limestone quarries; limestone is a heavy mineral and conveying it to market was expensive and difficult. France proposed a railway linking his quarries at Llanymynech through Kinnerley to Westbury (Salop), a place on the Shrewsbury and Welshpool Railway about 11 miles west of Shrewsbury. France succeeded in getting the West Shropshire Mineral Railway authorised, by an act of Parliament, West Shropshire Mineral Railway Act 1862 (25 & 26 Vict. c. clxxxv), of 29 July 1862.

West Shropshire Mineral Railway Act 1863
- Act of Parliament
- Parliament of the United Kingdom
- Long title: An Act to enable the West Shropshire Mineral Railway Company to make a Deviation and a new Railway, and to make Agreements with other Companies; and for other Purposes.
- Citation: 26 & 27 Vict. c. cxlv

Dates
- Royal assent: 13 July 1863

Text of statute as originally enacted

France's objective was to get the limestone to a main line railway station for onward consignment, and he was the prime mover in promoting the railway. The old idea of reaching a Welsh ferryport for Dublin remained, and a route involving a two-mile tunnel had been thought about. There was evidently some difficulty about the choice of Westbury, for the following year he obtained a modifying act of Parliament, the West Shropshire Mineral Railway Act 1863 (26 & 27 Vict. c. cxlv), on 13 July 1863; now his line would run from Llanymynech to Red Hill, much nearer Shrewsbury.

West Shropshire Mineral Railway (New Lines) Act 1864
- Act of Parliament
- Parliament of the United Kingdom
- Long title: An Act to enable the West Shropshire Mineral Railway Company to make certain new Lines of Railway, and to use a Portion of the Oswestry and Newtown Railway and the Llanymynech Station of that Railway; and for other Purposes.
- Citation: 27 & 28 Vict. c. cxxviii

Dates
- Royal assent: 30 June 1864

Text of statute as originally enacted

Shrewsbury and North Wales Railway Act 1864
- Act of Parliament
- Parliament of the United Kingdom
- Long title: An Act to change the Name of the West Shropshire Mineral Railway Company, and to enable them to make Branch Railways and a Deviation, and to alter the Line and Levels of their Railway; and to confer upon the said Company further Powers for making, crossing, and altering public Roads, and for the Purchase of additional Lands; and for other Purposes.
- Citation: 27 & 28 Vict. c. clvi

Dates
- Royal assent: 30 June 1864

Text of statute as originally enacted

No doubt reflecting on the impossibility of raising subscription capital for a railway with only one potential customer, France now extended the vision, and the scope of his proposed railway network, to include limekilns at Nantmawr and granite quarries at Criggion, and a branch to Great Ness. Moreover, the line would now carry passengers, and the company would be reincorporated as the Shrewsbury and North Wales Railway (S&NWR). An application was made for running powers into the main Shrewsbury station, but the running powers were opposed during the parliamentary process, so that the S&NWR would have to build its own line alongside the Welshpool line, and construct its own station at Shrewsbury. This act of Parliament, the Shrewsbury and North Wales Railway Act 1864 (27 & 28 Vict. c. clvi), was passed on 30 June 1864.

== Potteries, Shrewsbury and North Wales Railway ==
Shrewsbury and Potteries Junction Railway Act 1865
- Act of Parliament
- Parliament of the United Kingdom
- Long title: An Act to authorize the Construction of Railways in the County of Salop, to be called "The Shrewsbury and Potteries Junction Railway;" and for other Purposes.
- Citation: 28 & 29 Vict. c. cccxli

Dates
- Royal assent: 5 July 1865

Shrewsbury and Potteries Junction Railway (Deviations) Act 1866
- Act of Parliament
- Parliament of the United Kingdom
- Long title: Junction Railway Company to deviate from and alter Parts of their authorized Works, and to make new Branch and Junction Railways and Diversions of Roads in connexion with their authorised Works; and to amend "The Shrewsbury and Potteries Junction Railway Act, 1865;" and to authorize the Admission of the said Company to participate in the Ownership of the Wellington and Drayton Railway; and for other Purposes.
- Citation: 29 & 30 Vict. c. ccxi

Dates
- Royal assent: 16 July 1866

Text of statute as originally enacted

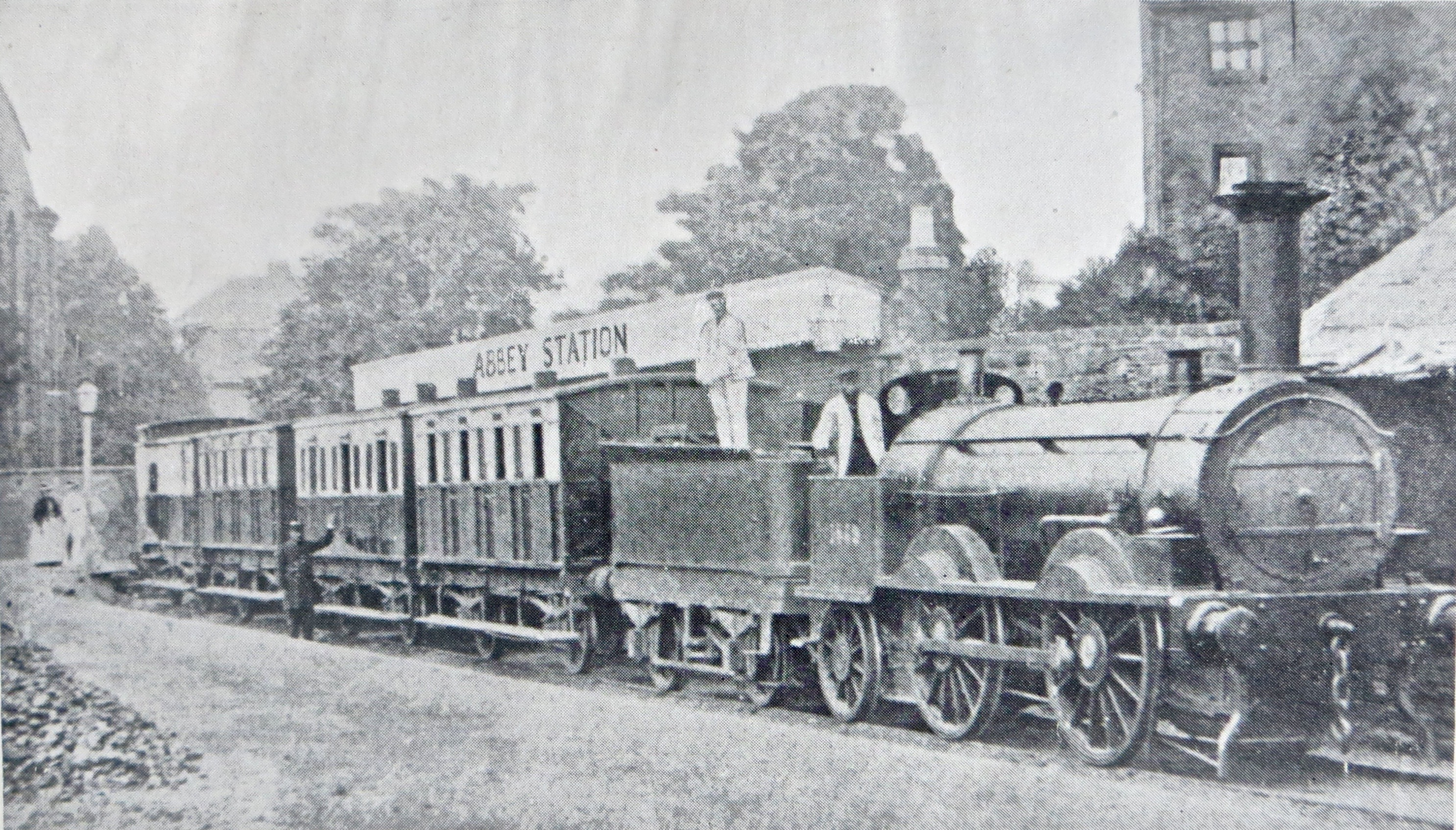
Potteries, Shrewsbury and North Wales train at Shrewsbury station, with a Bury, Curtis and Kennedy 0-4-2 locomotive, 1872-1874

The North Staffordshire Railway observed these developments and encouraged the projection of a subsidiary, the Shrewsbury and Potteries Junction Railway; this line got its authorising act, the Shrewsbury and Potteries Junction Railway Act 1865 (28 & 29 Vict. c. cccxli), on 5 July. The Potteries district around Stoke-on-Trent was the NSR's home, and a long line westward through Shrewsbury into north west Wales appeared attractive. The Shrewsbury and North Wales Railway would, it seemed, make an ideal partner in this venture that might stretch from Market Drayton.

Potteries, Shrewsbury and North Wales Act 1866
- Act of Parliament
- Parliament of the United Kingdom
- Long title: An Act to amalgamate the Shrewsbury and North Wales and Shrewsbury and Potteries Junction Railway Companies.
- Citation: 29 & 30 Vict. c. cci

Dates
- Royal assent: 16 July 1866

Text of statute as originally enacted

The alliance was agreed and progressed through Parliament, gaining authorisation in the Potteries, Shrewsbury and North Wales Act 1866 (29 & 30 Vict. c. cci) on 16 July, and the result was the Potteries, Shrewsbury and North Wales Railway (PS&NWR), commonly abbreviated to "the Potts". The new company now contemplated extending to Porthmadog.

The first part of the line, from Shrewsbury to Llanymynech, was opened without ceremony on 13 August 1866; there were four trains each way except Sunday, when there were two. The line was double track. The line had its own terminus in the grounds of the Shrewsbury Abbey; trains leaving faced a stiff climb at 1 in 47 to get out of the station, to gain sufficient height to pass over the existing main lines, but after that the line was generally level or nearly so. There was a connecting spur from the joint line from Wellington. The main line of the railway ran parallel to and alongside the Welshpool line on its south side as far as Redhill, where it crossed over the other route and struck northwest.

The Abbey Foregate spur was opened at the same time, joining the Shrewsbury and Wellington Joint Railway to Wellington east of Shrewsbury, the only connection at Shrewsbury with other lines. At Llanymynech the line terminated in a junction with the Cambrian Railways; the PS&NWR had its own platforms there. The main line was double track at first, singled later, and there were fourteen stations. The total length of the network was now 28 miles.

The company's finances were in a desperate state from the outset, and a debenture holder, dissatisfied with the treatment of his claim for payment, obtained a writ against the company. On 3 December 1866 bailiffs arrived at Shrewsbury station to take possession of the station and the line, and of arriving trains.

Subsequently, train operation took place only by consent of bailiffs who travelled with the trains. This state of affairs could hardly continue, and the company decided to sell some assets to realise ready cash. Auctioneers were appointed, but the sale of locomotives and other assets produced poor returns and the railway ceased operation from 21 December 1866.

Public services were resumed in December 1868 at a much reduced level. The double track section of the line was singled, probably during this closure period, and cash generated from the sale of rails was used to buy wagons that were urgently necessary for traffic purposes. Despite stringent cost saving measures, the line made only the smallest of profits, on capital expenditure of £1.5 million.

When the line reopened in 1868, there were five trains each way daily except Sundays when there were two. Co-operative arrangements with the Cambrian Railways had been established so that connections at Llanymynech were good, and through fares for certain journeys were available.

In 1871 the Criggion branch was opened, diverging at Kinnerley station. This was followed in 1872 by the Nantmawr extension from the Llanymynech former terminus; PS&NWR trains had running powers for a few yards there over the Cambrian Railways before diverging northwards towards Nantmawr.

== Closure ==
By the mid-1870s the company was losing money heavily; from 1874 a loss of over £2,000 annually was recorded for three successive years. As Perkins delicately puts it, "the stern pressure of liabilities caused a corresponding scarcity of funds for working", and maintenance of track and structures was hardly carried out.

In 1880 a 25 mph speed restriction was imposed on the whole line because of the poor standard of permanent way maintenance. This was insisted on by Col. Rich of the Board of Trade. The deterioration continued, and this culminated in an enforced closure of the line on 22 June 1880. This was the end of the Potteries, Shrewsbury and North Wales Railway and the core of its infrastructure network.

== After the suspension ==
R. S. France was still the proprietor of quarries at Nantmawr, and he still needed to get his product to market. The Nantmawr branch of the Potts line crossed the Cambrian Railways line at Llanymynech. If a connection was made, the Nantmawr line could become a branch of the Cambrian Railways and operate as a mineral line. France negotiated with the Cambrian Railways and with the receiver of the Potts line, and a deal was done. From 1 June 1881 the Cambrian would carry the traffic, and pay the PS&NWR 3d a ton for the use of the branch. It evidently took some time to implement the agreement, for the traffic started on 1 January 1886.

In time the Cambrian saw that this was potentially a permanent arrangement, and altered its lines at Llanymynech so that the continuation of its line to Llanfyllin branched from the Nantmawr branch; previously the two branches had crossed one another, and this arrangement simplified operations. The new system was opened on The Nantmawr branch reopened on 1 January 1896 and the Cambrian deviation was commissioned on 27 January 1896.

The Tanat Valley Light Railway was later opened, on 5 January 1904; on an east – west trajectory it crossed the Nantmawr branch at Blodwell Junction, actually using a short section of the branch. In fact from this time the Nantmawr terminus was reached from Blodwell Junction, and the section of the earlier Shropshire Railway to Blodwell from the junction on the Cambrian Railways west of Llanymynech was closed down.

Shropshire Railways Act 1888
- Act of Parliament
- Parliament of the United Kingdom
- Long title: An Act to incorporate the Shropshire Railways Company to empower them to acquire the Potteries Shrewsbury and North Wales Railway and to construct further railways and for other purposes.
- Citation: 51 & 52 Vict. c. cxcii

Dates
- Royal assent: 7 August 1888

Text of statute as originally enacted

Meanwhile, a new railway scheme was created, reviving earlier aspirations to connect the Potteries district. The Potts shareholders agreed on 14 March 1888 to accept £350,000 as the value of their shares, to be transferred to shares in a new Shropshire Railways Company, which was to build a connecting line to Hodnet on the Great Western Railway's Wellington to Market Drayton line. The line was authorised by an act of Parliament, the Shropshire Railways Act 1888 (51 & 52 Vict. c. cxcii) of 7 August 1888 but never built. On 24 August the Potts company's rolling stock and other moveable assets were sold by public auction.

== Revival ==
The major part of the Potteries Railway network was thus inactive and unmaintained. It appeared that there might never be any retrieval of its capability of a railway. However, in 1907 Holman Fred Stephens, later Colonel Stephens, who already had several light railways in his control, took an interest in the dormant line. He decided that the Potts Line could be revived as a light railway. He obtained the Shropshire and Montgomeryshire Light Railway Order 1909 on 17 January 1908, authorising the operation of all the Shropshire Railways system except the Nantmawr branch as a light railway. The new company was called the Shropshire and Montgomeryshire Light Railway.

The formal re-opening of the line took place on 13 April 1911, this time with invited guests. Opening to the general public took place the following day.

The financial performance of the new company was extremely poor, and maintenance and operations were reduced to the minimum.

The decline resulting in closure of all passenger operation, except for occasional excursions, was discontinued on 6 November 1933. The Criggion quarry train ran weekly, and occasional ordinary goods traffic served the intermediate stations.

== Military use ==
In 1941 the entire line except the Criggion branch was requisitioned by the War Department and established to serve an ammunition store. Extensive track renewal took place. Army steam engines were brought in, to service numerous storage depots that were set up. A new exchange location with the main line was established at Hookagate. From 1 June 1941 the War Department operated all trains on the line, military and civilian.

In 1947 the line was returned to civilian status, and the company was nationalised (along with most other main line railways in Great Britain) in 1948. The War Department usage continued, until in 1959 that came to an end, and in December 1959 the Criggion stone traffic ceased to operate as well. The final scheduled train ran on 26 February 1960 and on 29 February the line was closed. Abbey goods yard at Shrewsbury was retained.

The Nantmawr branch too continued as part of British Railways. The former Tanat Valley line had closed to passengers on 15 January 1951, and from December 1960 goods operation west of Blodwell Junction ceased. Nantmawr continued to be served by mineral trains from Oswestry.

== Locations down to 1880 ==
During the Potteries, Shrewsbury and North Wales Railway period, passenger train operation ceased during the suspension 1866 – 1868, and from 1880.

=== Main line ===
- Shrewsbury Abbey; opened 13 August 1866;
- Red Hill; opened 13 August 1866;
- Hanwood Road; opened 13 August 1871;
- Crossgates; opened 13 August 1866;
- Shrawardine; opened 13 August 1866;
- Nesscliff; opened 13 August 1866;
- Kinnerley; opened 13 August 1866;
- Maesbrook; opened 13 August 1866;
- Llanymynech; opened 13 August 1866;
- Llanyblodwell; opened 18 April 1870.

=== Criggion branch ===
- Kinnerley; above;
- Melverley; opened 21 June 1871;
- Crewe Green; opened 21 June 1871;
- Llandrinio Road; opened 21 June 1871;
- Criggion; opened 21 June 1871.

== Locomotives ==
Little is known about the locomotives. According to Woodcock one of them, named Black Tom, was a 0-4-2 tender locomotive built by Bury, Curtis, and Kennedy in 1848 and acquired from the London and North Western Railway in 1866.
