= Shoot Hill railway station =

Former railway station in Shropshire, England

Shoot Hill
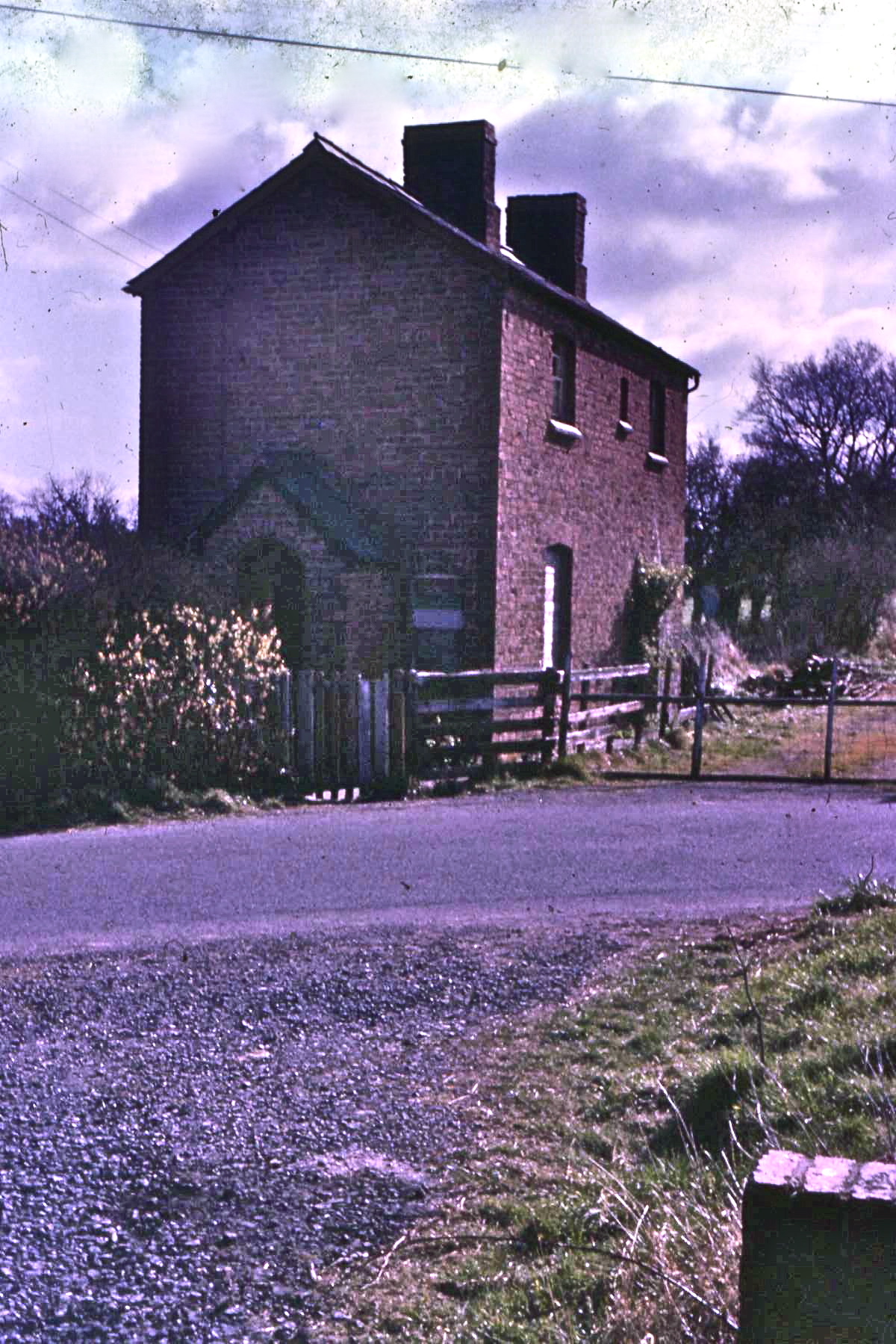
- Shoot Hill Halt in 1967

General information
- Location: South of Ford, Shropshire; England
- Coordinates: 52.7087°N 2.8617°W
- Grid reference: SJ419126
- Platforms: 1

Other information
- Status: Disused

History
- Pre-grouping: Shropshire and Montgomeryshire Railway
- Post-grouping: Shropshire and Montgomeryshire Railway

Key dates
- 1921: opened
- 6 November 1933: Closed for public services
Location

Shoot Hill railway station was a station to the south of Ford, Shropshire, England. The station was opened in 1921 and closed in 1933. Although its official closure was on 29 February 1960, a 2-coach Stephenson Locomotive Society train ran through on 20 March.

Crossing Cottage is now on the site of the station.

Preceding station	Disused railways	Following station
Ford and Crossgates; Line and station closed	Shropshire and Montgomeryshire Railway	Cruckton; Line and station closed
