= W. H. Austen =

British engineer (1878–1956)

William Henry Austen (8 May 1878 – 26 February 1956) was a British railway engineer who took over the running of Colonel Stephens' light railways on the latter's death in 1931 until his own retirement in 1948, by which time the lines had either closed due to competition from motor bus and lorry, or became part of British Railways.
