= Shrewsbury West railway station =

Former railway station in Shropshire, England

Shrewsbury West

General information
- Location: Shrewsbury, Shropshire; England
- Coordinates: 52.6973°N 2.7500°W
- Grid reference: SJ493113
- Platforms: 1

Other information
- Status: Disused

History
- Pre-grouping: Shropshire and Montgomeryshire Railway
- Post-grouping: Shropshire and Montgomeryshire Railway

Key dates
- 14 April 1911: opened
- 6 November 1933: Closed for public services
Location

Shrewsbury West railway station was a station located in Belle Vue, Shrewsbury, Shrewsbury, Shropshire, England that opened in 1911 and closed in 1933. It was demolished without trace after closing.

Preceding station	Disused railways	Following station
Meole Brace; Line closed, station closed	Shropshire and Montgomeryshire Railway	Shrewsbury Abbey; Line and station closed
