= Meole Brace railway station =

Former railway station in Shropshire, England

Meole Brace

General information
- Location: Meole Brace, Shropshire; England
- Coordinates: 52.6912°N 2.7667°W
- Grid reference: SJ482106
- Platforms: 1

Other information
- Status: Disused

History
- Original company: Shropshire and Montgomeryshire Railway
- Pre-grouping: Shropshire and Montgomeryshire Railway
- Post-grouping: Shropshire and Montgomeryshire Railway

Key dates
- 14 April 1911: Opened
- 6 November 1933: Closed to passengers
Location

Meole Brace railway station was a station in Meole Brace, Shropshire, England. It was opened in 1911 and closed to passengers in 1933. The station was demolished after closure, leaving no trace of its existence, except that the road leading to the station site is, as of 2025, still called Station Road.

Preceding station	Disused railways	Following station
Hookagate and Redhill; Line and station closed	Shropshire and Montgomeryshire Railway	Shrewsbury West; Line and station closed
