= Hookagate and Redhill railway station =

Former railway station in Shropshire, England

Hookagate and Redhill
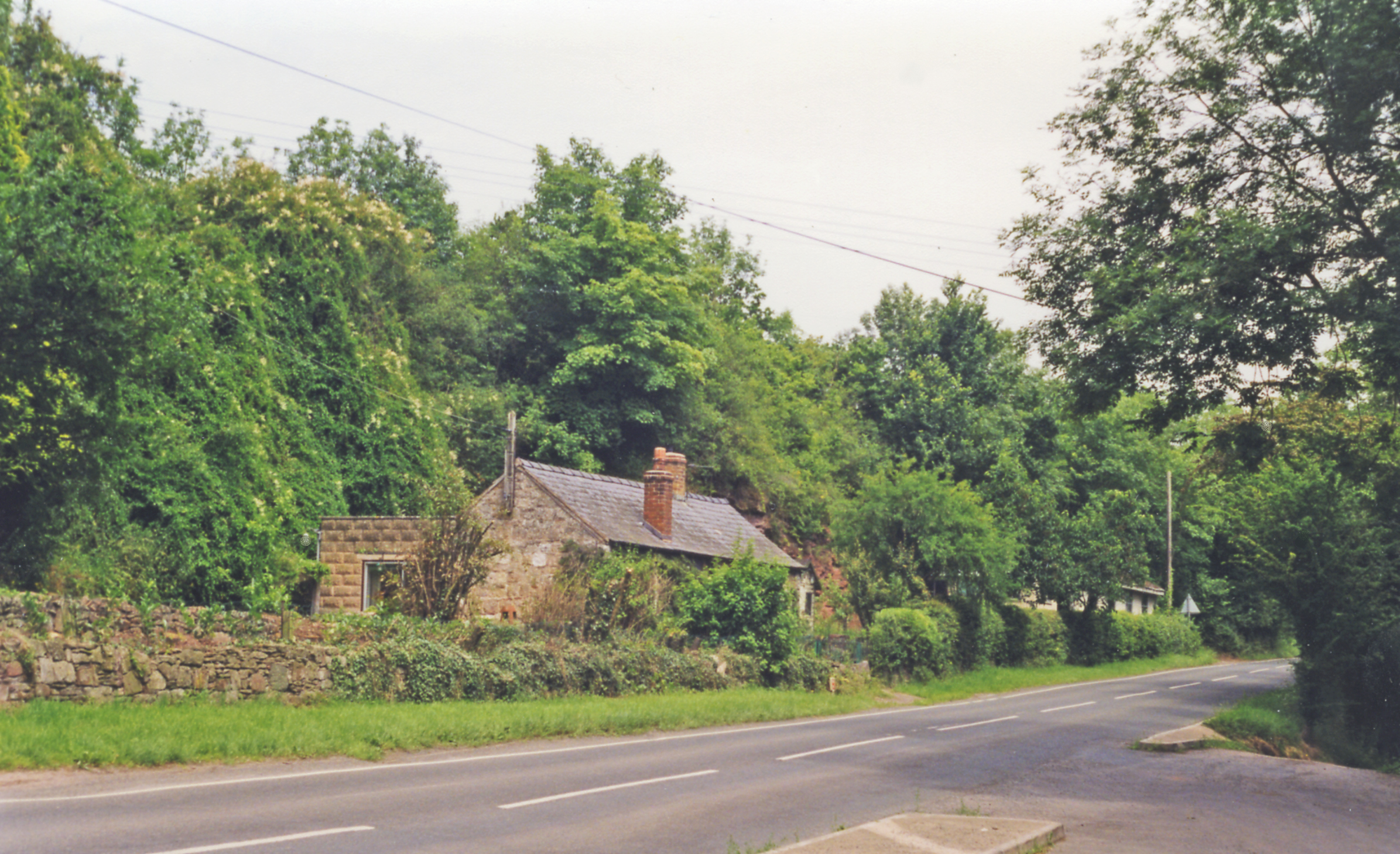
- The site of the station in 1998

General information
- Location: Hook-a-Gate, Shropshire; England
- Coordinates: 52.6829°N 2.7864°W
- Grid reference: SJ470097
- Platforms: 1

Other information
- Status: Disused

History
- Pre-grouping: Shropshire and Montgomeryshire Railway
- Post-grouping: Shropshire and Montgomeryshire Railway

Key dates
- 14 April 1911: Opened as Red Hill
- May 1921: Name changed to Hookagate
- 1927: Name changed to Hookagate and Redhill
- 6 November 1933: Closed for public services
Location

Hookagate and Redhill railway station was a station in Hook-a-Gate, Shropshire, England. The station was opened in 1911 and closed in 1933.

Preceding station	Disused railways	Following station
Hanwood Road; Line and station closed	Shropshire and Montgomeryshire Railway	Meole Brace; Line and station closed
