= Criggion Radio Station =

Transmitter site in Powys, Wales

Criggion
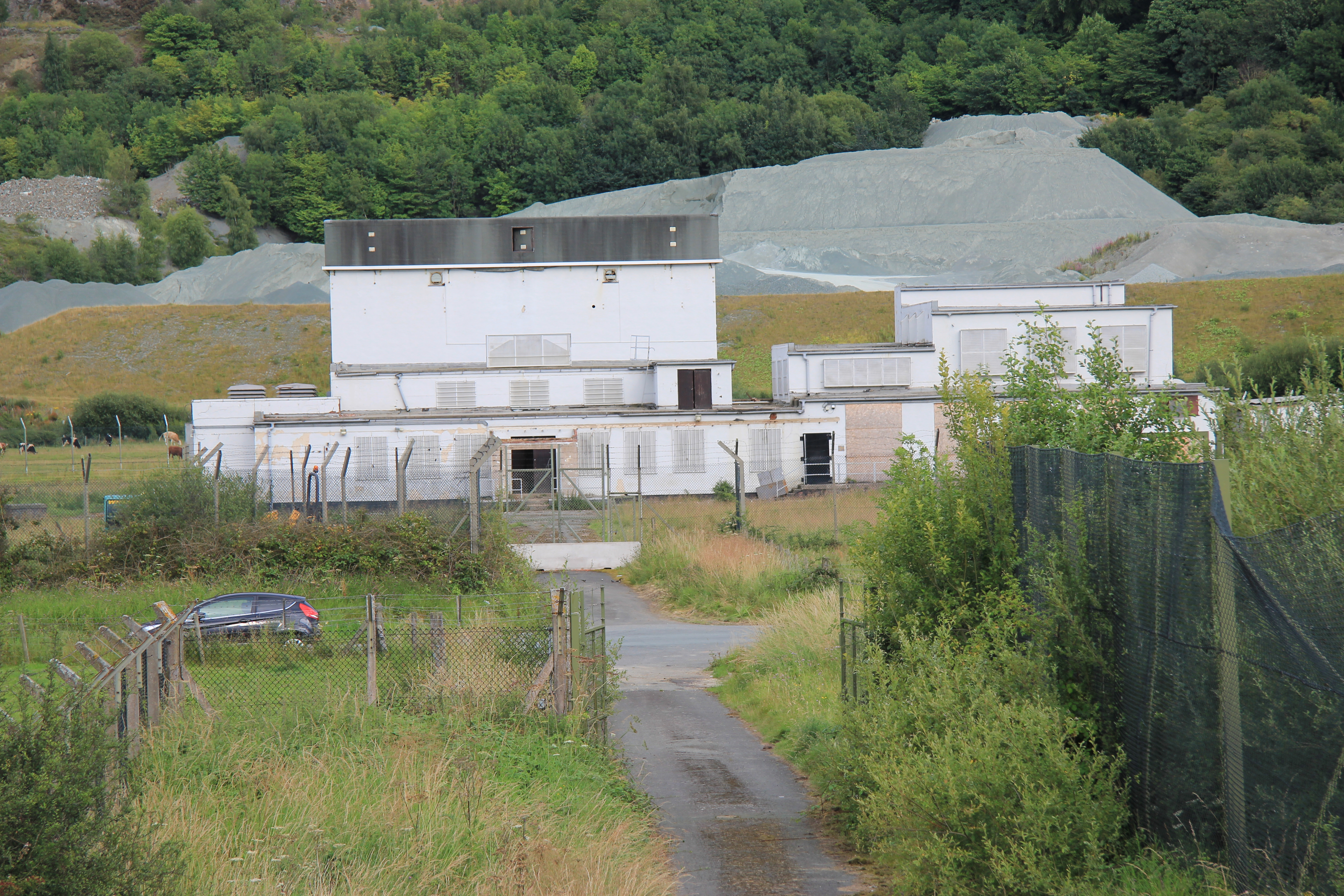
- Criggion Radio Station in 2011

- Location within Powys
- Location: Criggion, Powys
- Mast height: 213.4 metres (700 ft)
- Tower height: 182.9 metres (600 ft)
- Coordinates: 52.72246°N 3.06295°W
- Grid reference: SJ2821614435
- Built: 1940s
- Demolished: 2003

Criggion Radio Station was a transmitter site latterly operated by BT on behalf of the UK Ministry of Defence. It was located near the village of Criggion in the parish of Bausley with Criggion, which lies in the county of Powys, Wales.

It was established in World War II as a back-up unit for Rugby Radio Station and took over the latter's traffic for a short period in 1943 following a fire at Rugby. Operating on 19.6 kHz with the callsign GBZ, the station was used until its shutdown on 1 April 2003 for sending messages to submarines. This task (and that of Rugby) is now carried out by the Anthorn radio station. Criggion's VLF antenna was hung from three free-standing steel lattice towers at 182.9 metres (600 ft) tall, three guyed masts at 213.4 metres (700 ft) tall and a rock anchor. The towers and masts were demolished in August 2003 but, although there is now less obvious visible evidence that a large radio station existed on the site, the derelict main transmitting building still survived in 2011 and the foundation sites of the former masts can be still be located on satellite and aerial photographs.

As of May 2013 the remaining parts of the station were reported to be in a state of disrepair.

== Gallery ==
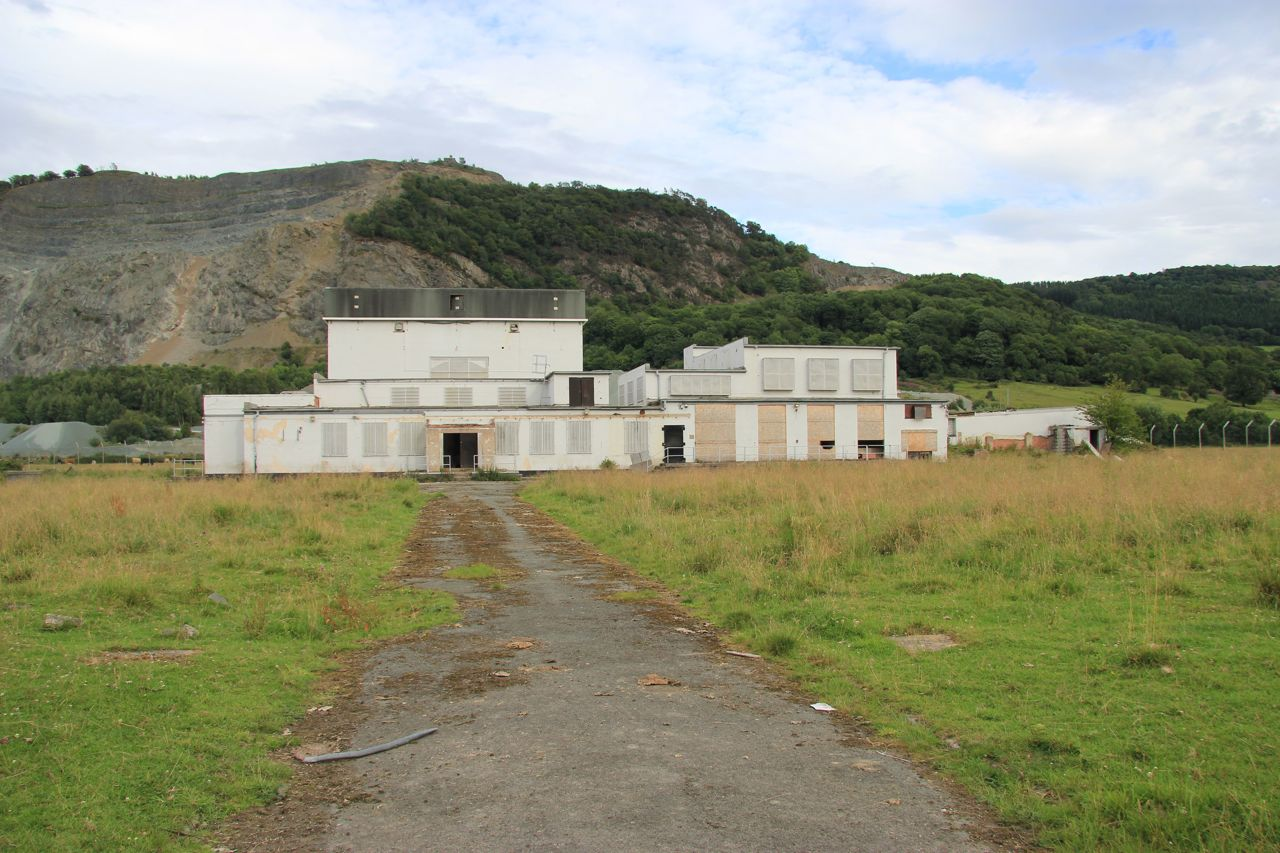

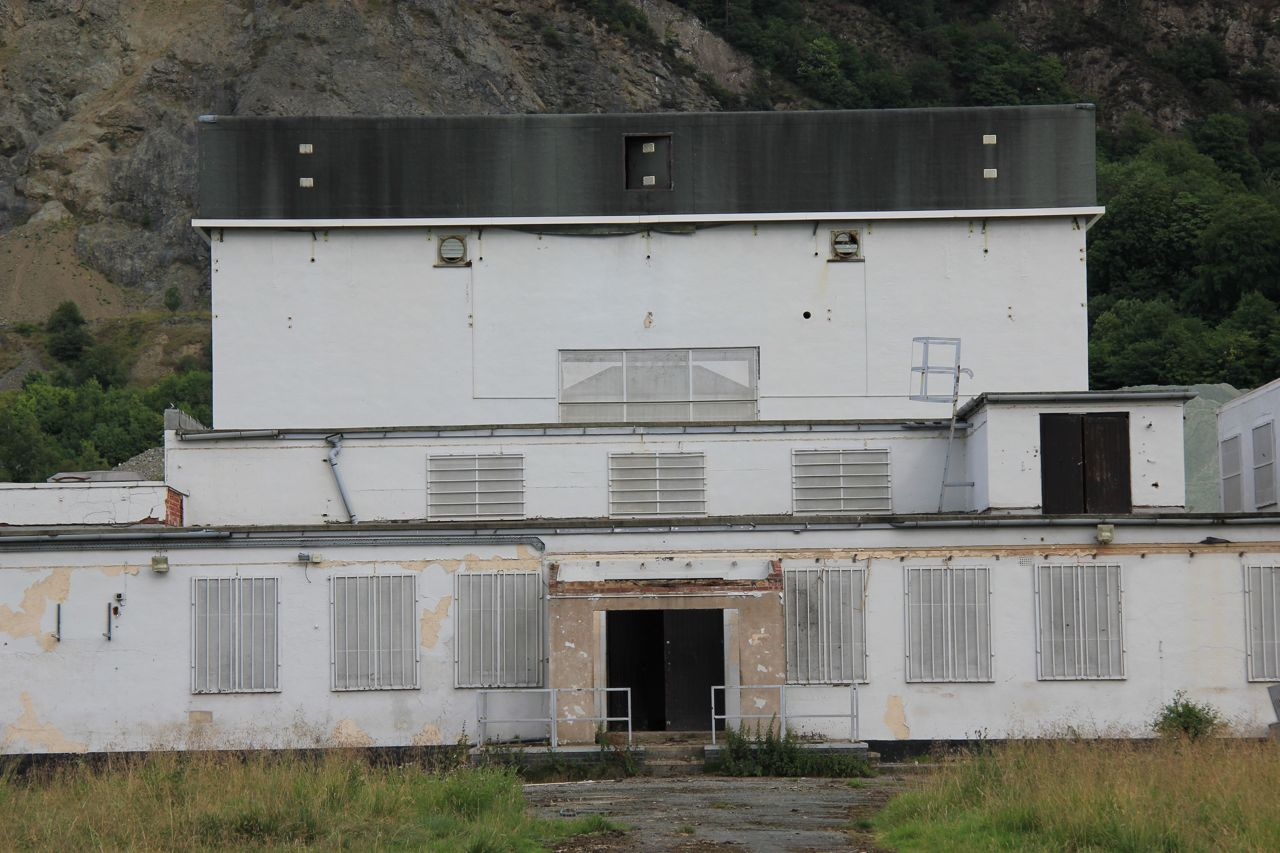

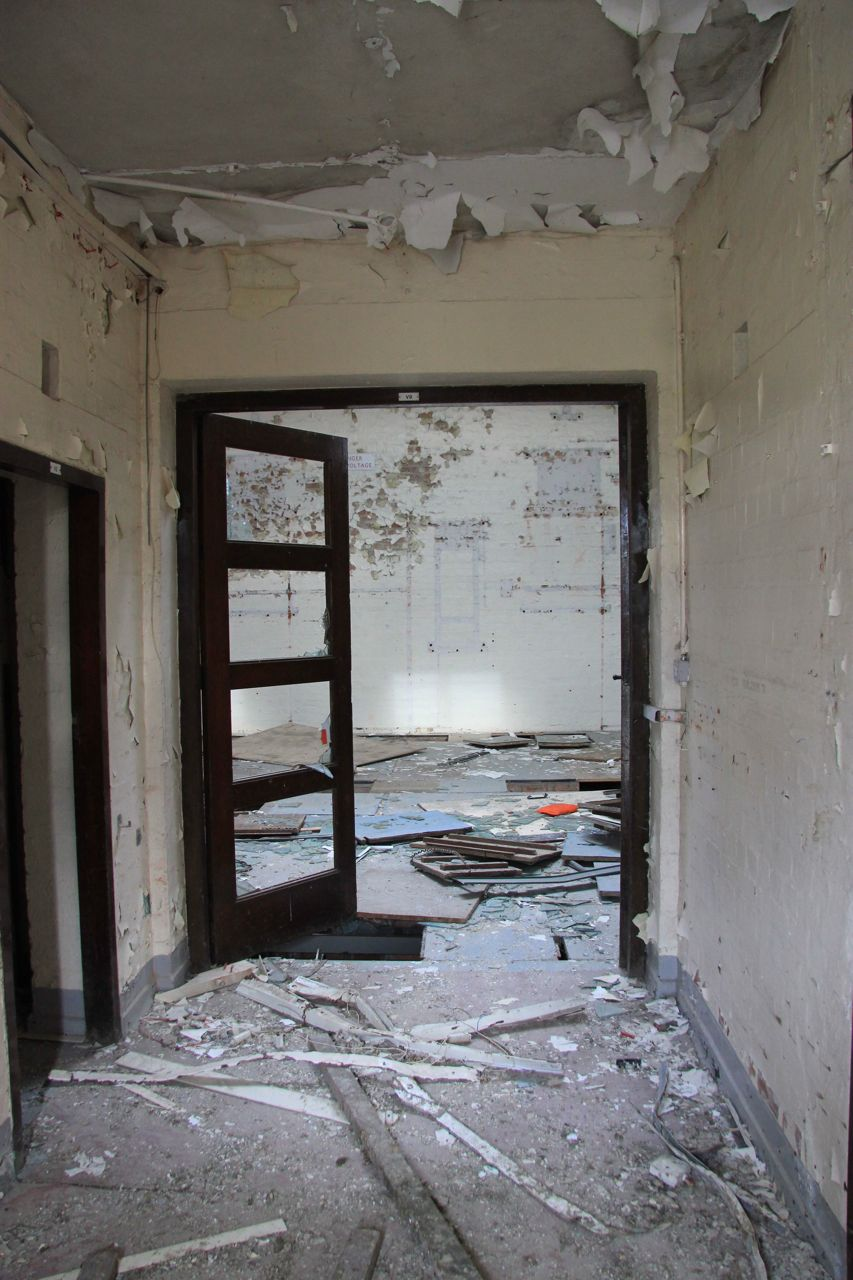

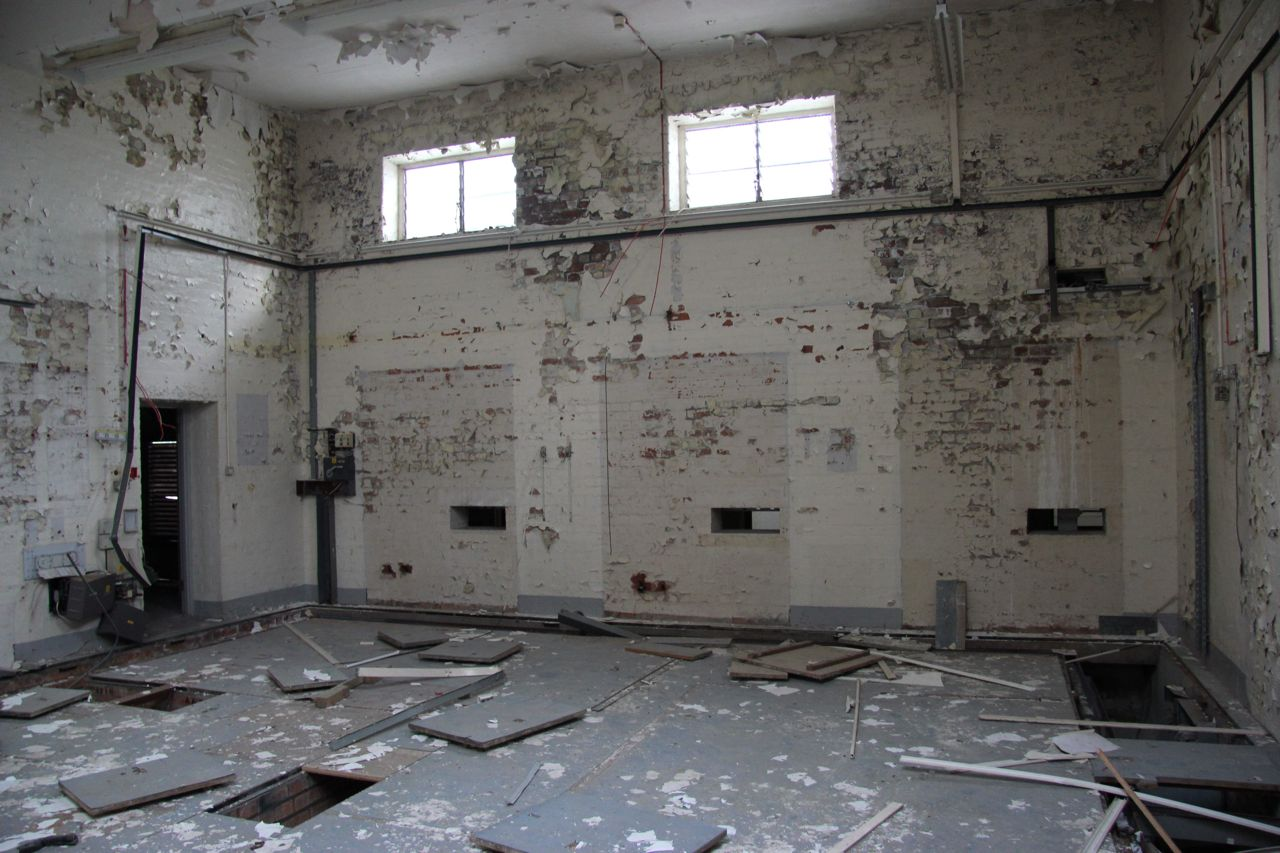

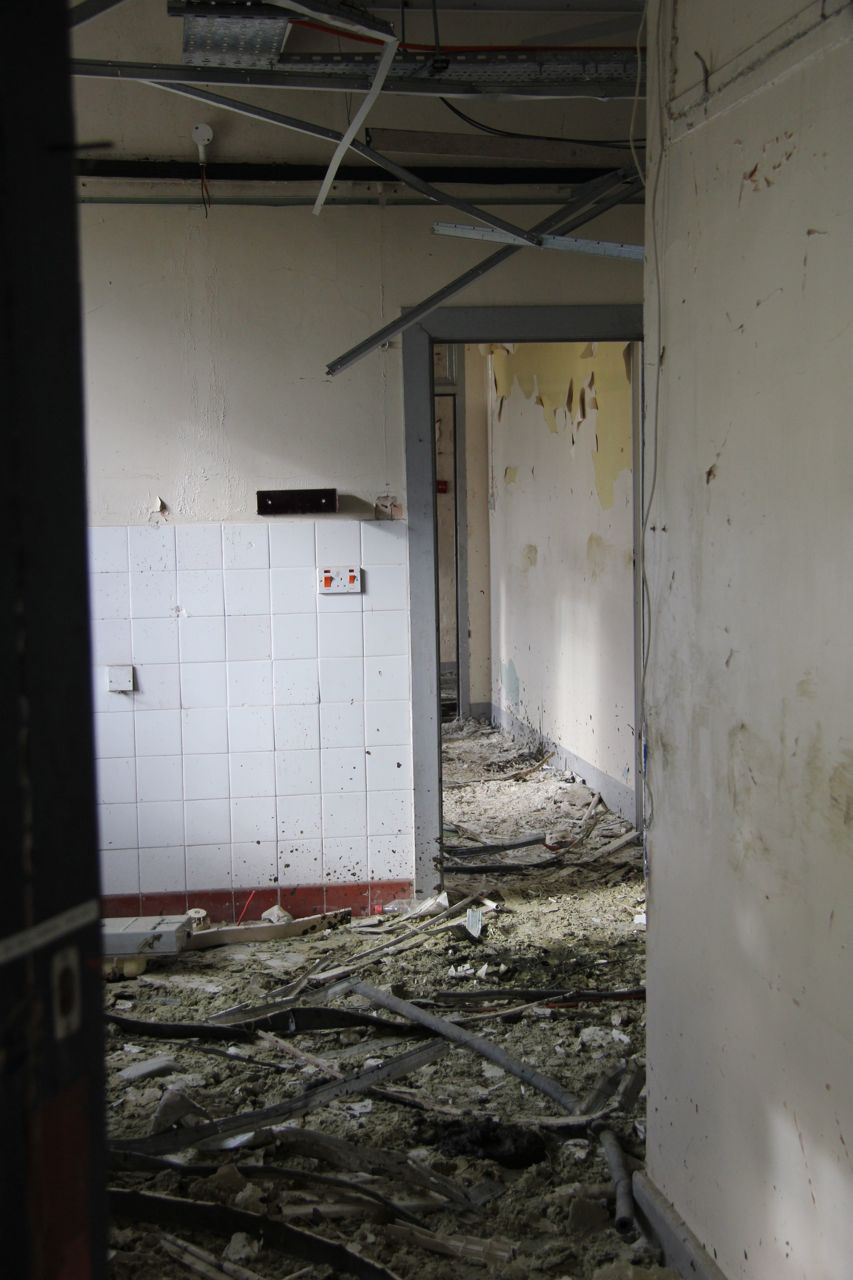

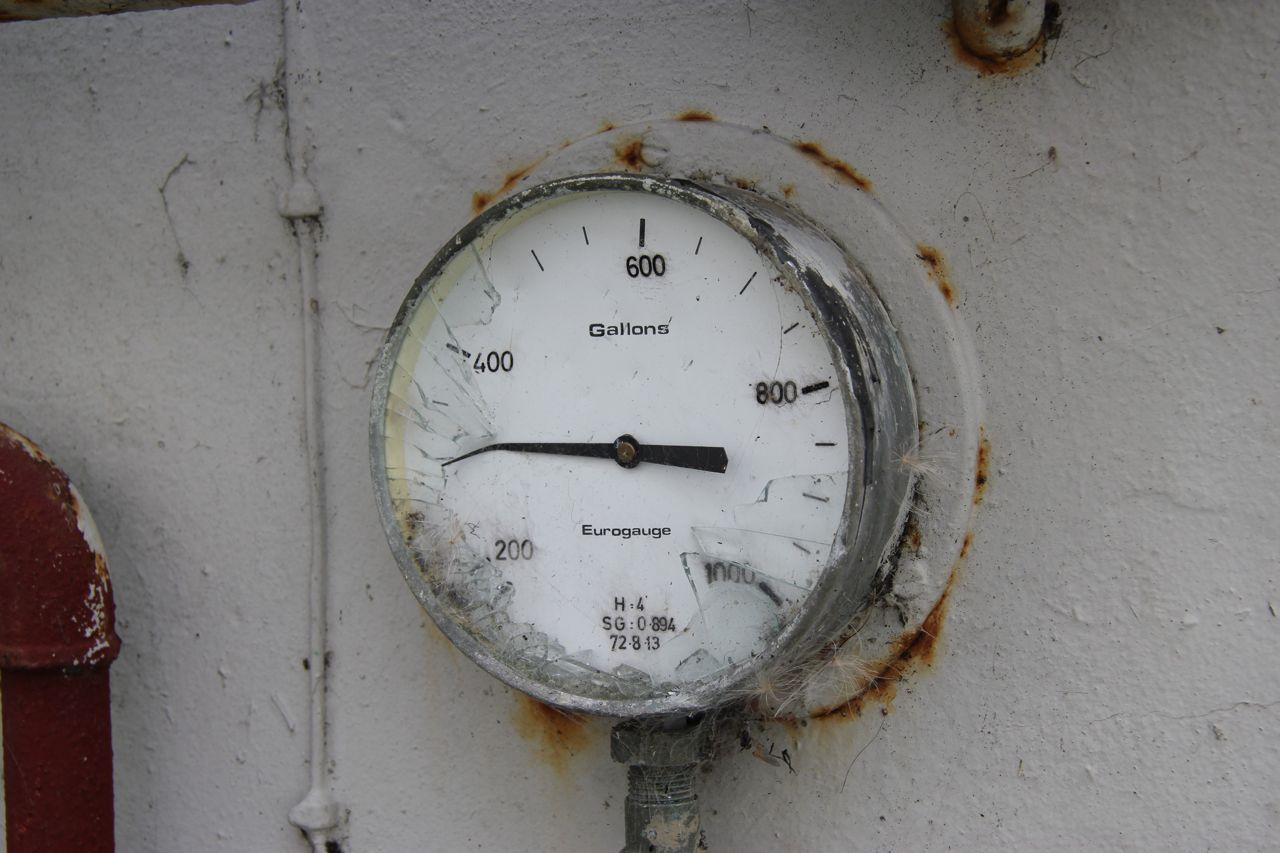

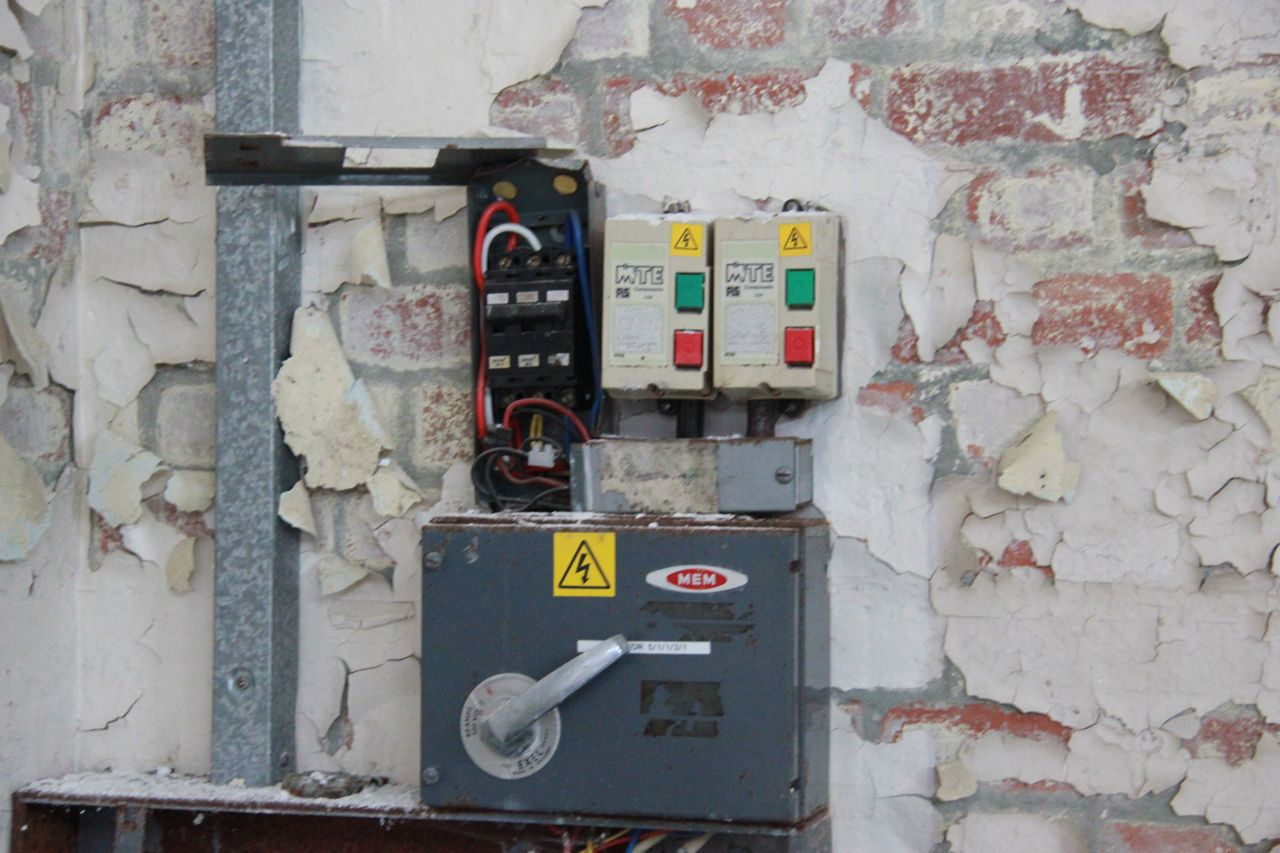

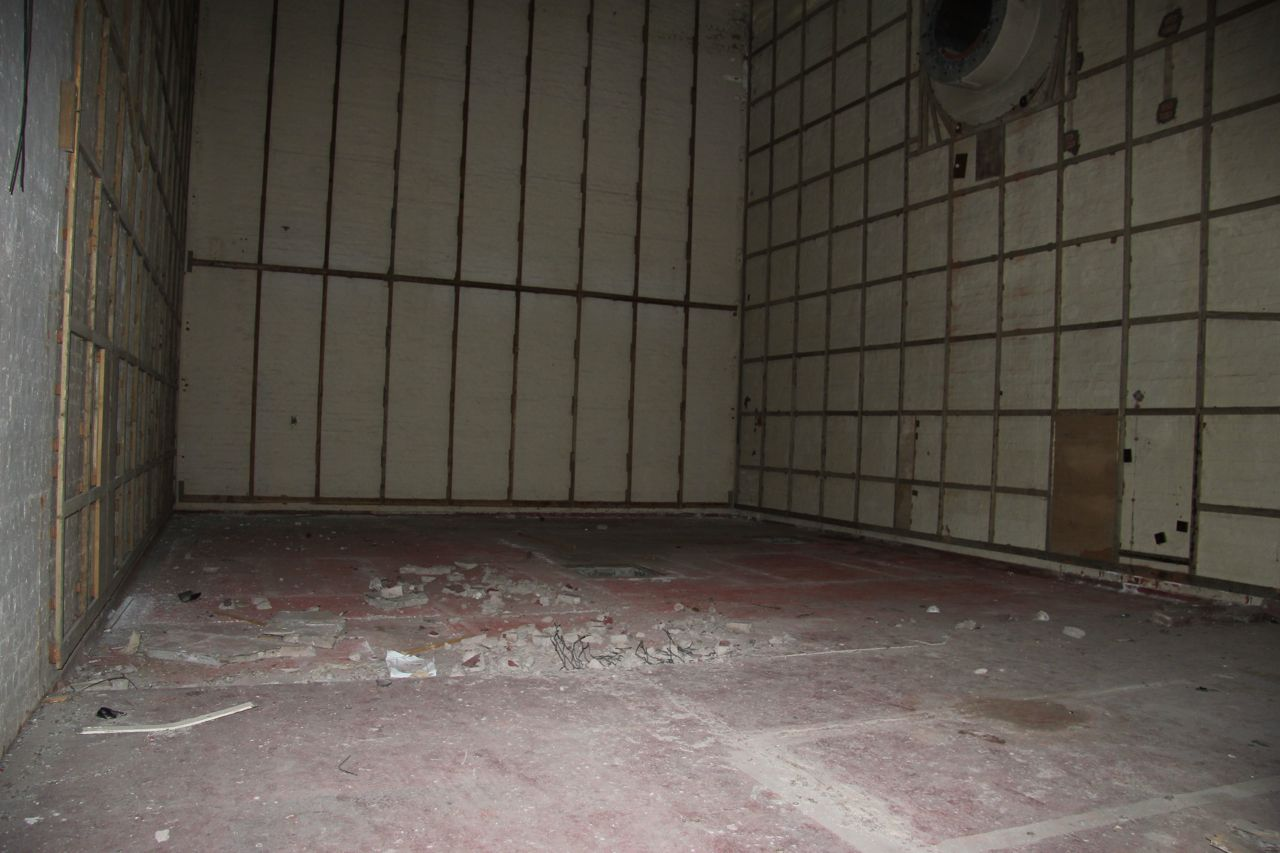

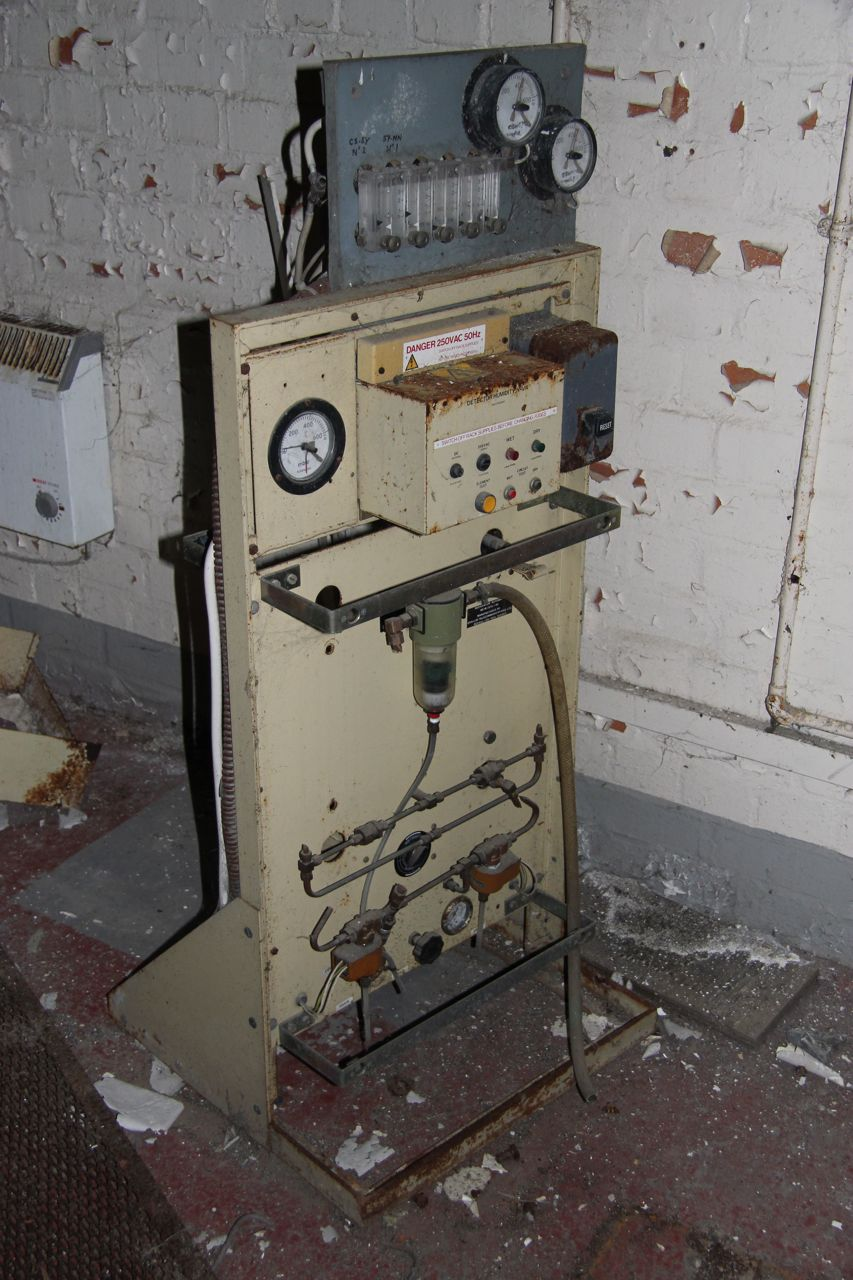

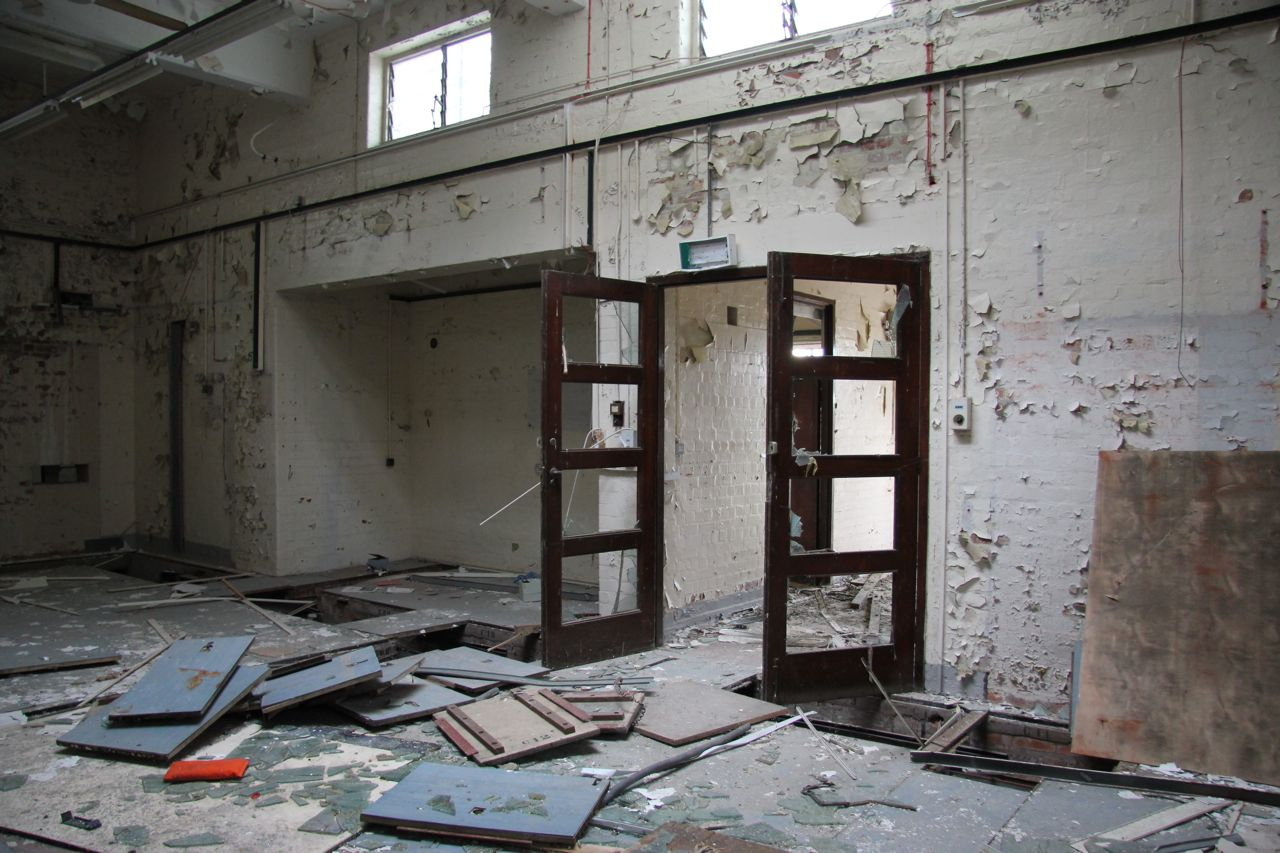
