= Redhill station =

Redhill station may refer to:

- Redhill railway station, Redhill, Surrey, England
- Redhill MRT station in Singapore

== See also ==
- Redhill (disambiguation)
