= Edgerley Halt railway station =

Former railway station in Shropshire, England

Edgerley Halt

General information
- Location: Southeast of Kinnerley, Shropshire; England
- Coordinates: 52.769°N 2.971°W
- Grid reference: SJ349194
- Platforms: 1

Other information
- Status: Disused

History
- Original company: Shropshire and Montgomeryshire Railway
- Post-grouping: Shropshire and Montgomeryshire Railway

Key dates
- 16 June 1927: opened
- 6 November 1933: Closed for public services
Location

Edgerley Halt railway station was a station to the southeast of Kinnerley, Shropshire, England. The station was opened in 1927 and closed in 1933.

Preceding station	Disused railways	Following station
Kinnerley Junction; Line and station closed	Shropshire and Montgomeryshire Railway	Nesscliffe and Pentre; Line and station closed
