= Hanwood Road railway station =

Former railway station in Shropshire, England

Hanwood Road

General information
- Location: Edgebold, Shropshire; England
- Coordinates: 52.6864°N 2.8123°W
- Grid reference: SJ453102
- Platforms: 1

Other information
- Status: Disused

History
- Original company: Potteries, Shrewsbury and North Wales Railway
- Pre-grouping: Shropshire and Montgomeryshire Railway
- Post-grouping: Shropshire and Montgomeryshire Railway

Key dates
- 13 August 1866: Station opened as Edgebold
- 21 December 1866: Closed
- December 1868: Reopened
- 22 June 1880: Closed
- 14 April 1911: Reopened by S&MR
- 1 April 1921: renamed
- 6 November 1933: Closed for public services
Location

Hanwood Road railway station was a station in Edgebold, Shropshire, England. The station opened as Edgebold railway station, first opened in 1866 and closed for the last time in 1933.

Edgebold station stood on what became the Shropshire and Montgomeryshire Railway. The station was located on the south side of the bridge by which the line crossed the main road, between Lower Edgebold and Hanwood Bank. The same station was initially open under the name Hanwood Road, during the line's first incarnation as the Potteries, Shrewsbury and North Wales Railway.

On the site of that station, in 1938, was built a plant that prepared and bottled milk for delivery until it closed in 1990.

| Preceding station | Disused railways | Following station |
|---|---|---|
| Cruckton; Line and station closed | Shropshire and Montgomeryshire Railway; Potteries, Shrewsbury and North Wales Railway | Hookagate and Redhill; Line and station closed |
