= Red Hills =

Red Hills may refer to:

== Places ==
=== United States ===
- Red Hills (San Luis Obispo County), a mountain range in California
- Red Hills (Tuolumne County), a mountain range in California
- Red Hills (Kansas), a physiographic region
- Red Hills (Charlottesville, Virginia), a historic home and farm complex
- Red Hills Lake County AVA, California
- Red Hills Region, in Georgia and Florida
- Red Hills State Park, in Illinois
- Red Hills Wind Farm, in Oklahoma
- Red Hills of Dundee, in Oregon

=== Elsewhere ===
- Red Hills, Tasmania, Australia
- Red Hills, Chennai, or Sengundram, India
  - Red Hills Lake, or Puzhal aeri, Chennai
- Red Hills, Hyderabad, India
- Maibam Lokpa Ching or Red Hills, World War II historical site in Manipur, India
- Red Hills Fissure, Jamaica
- Red Hills or Red Cuillin, a range of hills on Skye, Scotland

== See also ==
- Red Hill (disambiguation)
- Redhill (disambiguation)
- Redhills (disambiguation)
- Red Hills salamander
