= Redhill School =

Redhill School may refer to:

- Redhill School (Johannesburg), in Morningside, Johannesburg, Gauteng, South Africa
- Redhill School, Stourbridge, in Stourbridge, West Midlands, England
- Redhill Academy, in Arnold, Nottinghamshire, England
- Red Hill School, in Red Hill, Canberra, Australia
- A primary school in Red Hill, New Zealand

== See also ==
- Redhill (disambiguation)
