= Melverley railway station =

Former railway station in England

Melverley

General information
- Location: Melverley, Shropshire; England
- Coordinates: 52.7468°N 2.9890°W
- Grid reference: SJ334169

Other information
- Status: Disused

History
- Original company: Potteries, Shrewsbury and North Wales Railway
- Pre-grouping: Shropshire and Montgomeryshire Railway
- Post-grouping: Shropshire and Montgomeryshire Railway

Key dates
- 21 June 1871: Opened
- 6 November 1933: Closed
Location

Melverley railway station was a station in Melverley, Shropshire, England. The station was opened in 1871 and closed in 1933.

Preceding station	Disused railways	Following station
Chapel Lane; Line and station closed	Shropshire and Montgomeryshire Railway; Potteries, Shrewsbury and North Wales Railway	Crew Green; Line and station closed
