= Kinnerley Junction railway station =

Former railway station in Shropshire, England

Kinnerley Junction

General information
- Location: Kinnerley, Shropshire; England
- Coordinates: 52.7727°N 2.9831°W
- Grid reference: SJ338199
- Platforms: 3

Other information
- Status: Disused

History
- Original company: Potteries, Shrewsbury and North Wales Railway
- Pre-grouping: Shropshire and Montgomeryshire Railway
- Post-grouping: Shropshire and Montgomeryshire Railway

Key dates
- 13 August 1866: Station opened
- 21 December 1866: Closed
- December 1868: Reopened
- 22 June 1880: Closed
- 14 April 1911: Reopened by S&MR
- 6 November 1933: Closed for public services
Location

Kinnerley Junction railway station was a station to the south of Kinnerley, Shropshire, England. The station was opened in 1866 and closed in 1933.

Preceding station	Disused railways	Following station
Wern Las; Line and station closed	Shropshire and Montgomeryshire Railway; Potteries, Shrewsbury and North Wales Railway	Edgerley Halt; Line and station closed
Chapel Lane; Line and station closed	Shropshire and Montgomeryshire Railway; Potteries, Shrewsbury and North Wales Railway	Edgerley Halt; Line and station closed
