= Ford and Crossgates railway station =

Former railway station in Shropshire, England

Ford and Crossgates

General information
- Location: Ford, Shropshire; England
- Coordinates: 52.7145°N 2.8746°W
- Grid reference: SJ411132
- Platforms: 1

Other information
- Status: Disused

History
- Original company: Potteries, Shrewsbury and North Wales Railway
- Pre-grouping: Shropshire and Montgomeryshire Railway
- Post-grouping: Shropshire and Montgomeryshire Railway

Key dates
- 13 August 1866: Station opened
- 21 December 1866: Closed
- December 1868: Reopened
- 22 June 1880: Closed
- 14 April 1911: Reopened by S&MR
- 6 November 1933: Closed for public services
Location

Ford and Crossgates railway station was a station in Ford, Shropshire, England. The station was opened in 1866 and closed in 1933.

Preceding station	Disused railways	Following station
Shrawardine; Line and station closed	Shropshire and Montgomeryshire Railway; Potteries, Shrewsbury and North Wales Railway	Shoot Hill; Line and station closed
