= Wern Las railway station =

Disused railway station in England

Wern Las

General information
- Location: West of Kinnerley, Shropshire; England
- Coordinates: 52.7766°N 3.0146°W
- Grid reference: SJ317204

Other information
- Status: Disused

History
- Pre-grouping: Shropshire and Montgomeryshire Railway
- Post-grouping: Shropshire and Montgomeryshire Railway

Key dates
- December 1919: opened
- 6 November 1933: Closed for public services
Location

Wern Las railway station was a station to the west of Kinnerley, Shropshire, England. The station was opened in 1919 and closed in 1933.

Preceding station	Disused railways	Following station
Maesbrook; Line and station closed	Shropshire and Montgomeryshire Railway	Kinnerley Junction; Line and station closed
