= Cruckton railway station =

Former railway station in Shropshire, England

Cruckton
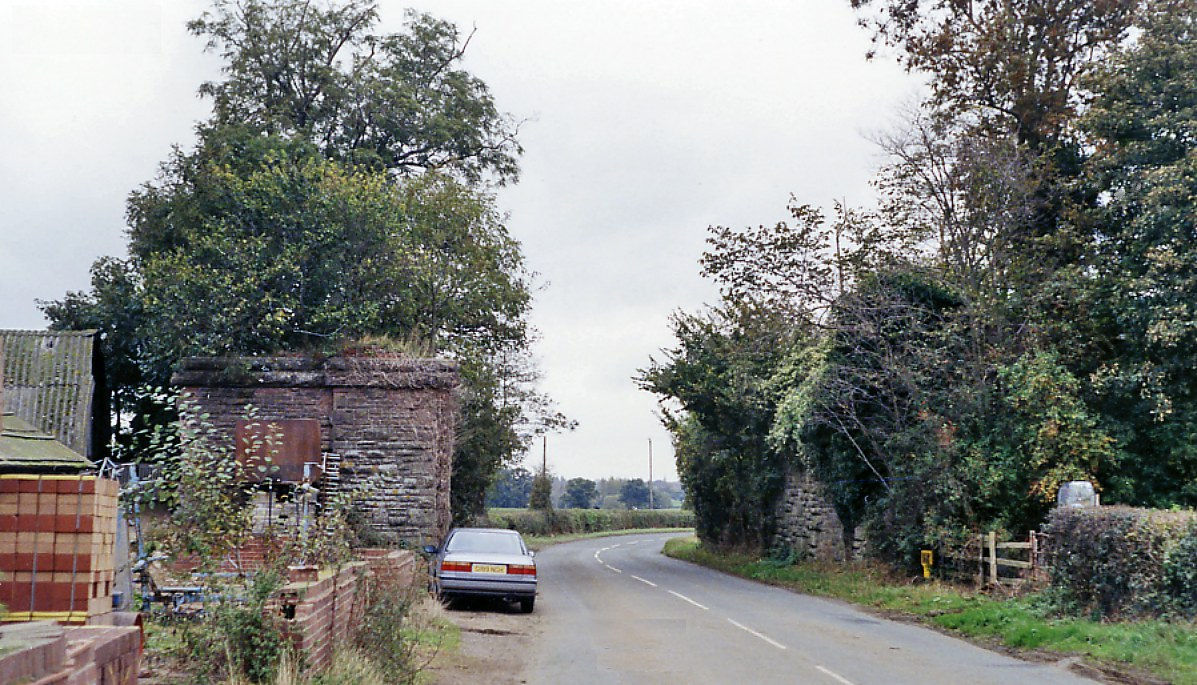
- The remains of the railway bridge near the site of the station in 1991

General information
- Location: Cruckton, Shropshire; England
- Coordinates: 52.6977°N 2.8314°W
- Grid reference: SJ440113
- Platforms: 1

Other information
- Status: Disused

History
- Pre-grouping: Shropshire and Montgomeryshire Railway
- Post-grouping: Shropshire and Montgomeryshire Railway

Key dates
- 1913: Opened
- 6 November 1933: Closed for public services
Location

Cruckton railway station was a station in Cruckton, Shropshire, England. The station was opened in 1913 and closed in 1933.

Preceding station	Disused railways	Following station
Shoot Hill; Line and station closed	Shropshire and Montgomeryshire Railway	Hanwood Road; Line and station closed
