= Redhills =

Redhills may refer to:

- Redhills, Cumbria, a hamlet in England
- Redhills, County Cavan, a village in Ireland
  - Redhills railway station (closed)
  - Redhills GFC, a Gaelic football club
- Redhills, Devon, a suburb in Exeter, England
- Redhills, Durham, headquarters of the Durham Miners' Association
- Sengundram, a suburb of Chennai

== See also ==
- Redhill (disambiguation)
- Red Hills (disambiguation)
