= H. F. Stephens =

British railway engineer (1868–1931)

Colonel Holman Fred Stephens (31 October 1868 – 23 October 1931) was a British light railway civil engineer and manager. He was engaged in engineering and building, and later managing, 16 light railways in England and Wales.

== Biography ==
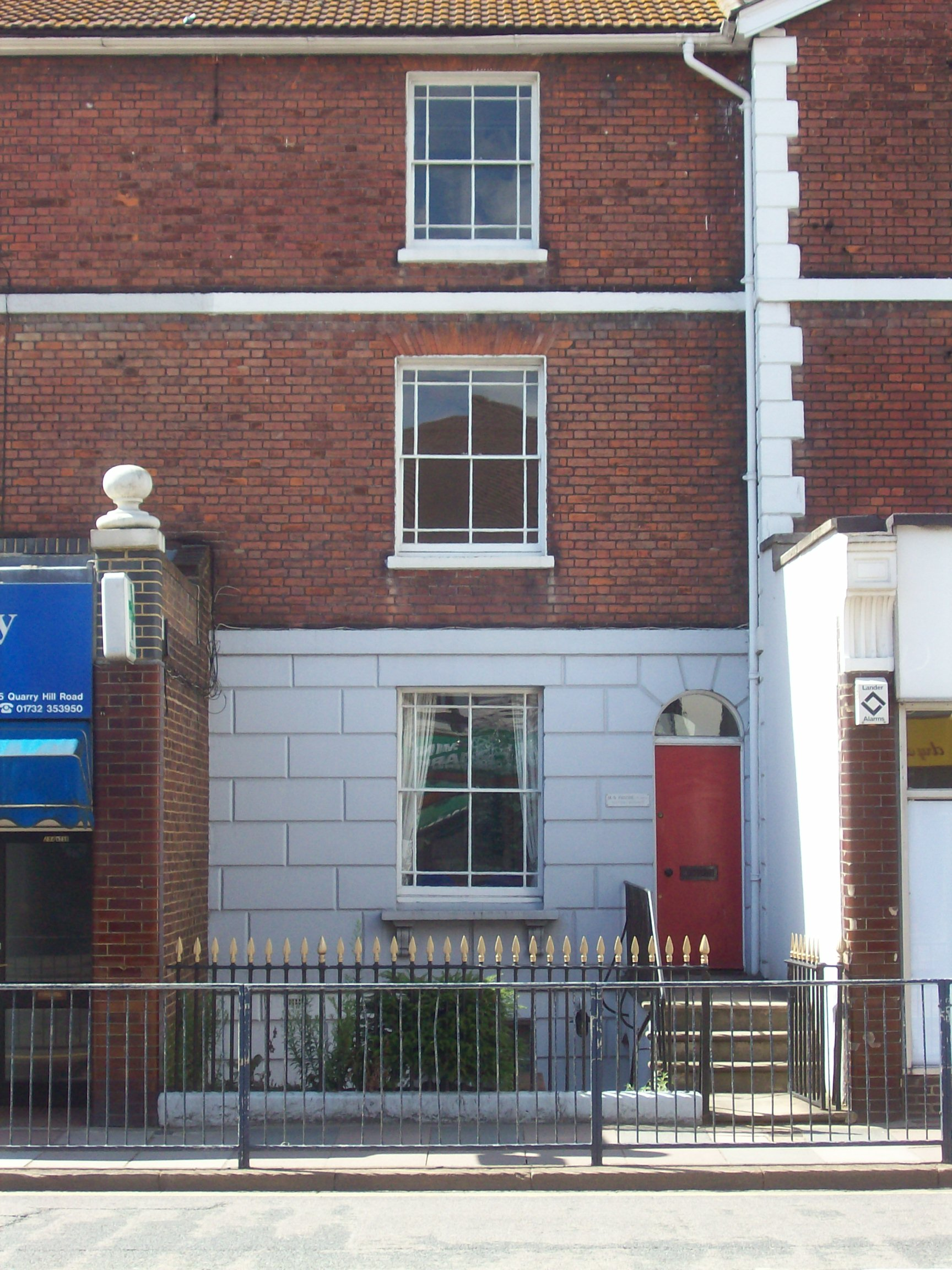
23 Salford Terrace, Tonbridge

Stephens was the son of Frederic George Stephens, Pre-Raphaelite artist and art critic, and his wife the artist Rebecca Clara (née Dalton). He was named after his father's friend and former tutor, the painter Holman Hunt, although the two later fell out. He was a great nephew of the naturalist, explorer and biologist, Charles Darwin.

Stephens was apprenticed in the workshops of the Metropolitan Railway in 1881. He was an assistant engineer during the building of the Cranbrook and Paddock Wood Railway, which opened in 1892. In 1894 he became an associate member of the Institution of Civil Engineers, which allowed him to design and build railways in his own right.

He immediately set about his lifetime's project of operating light railways for rural areas, mostly planned and built under the Light Railways Act 1896 (59 & 60 Vict. c. 48). His first two railways, the Rye and Camber Tramway and the Hundred of Manhood and Selsey Tramway, predated this, but he built the first railway under the act, the Rother Valley Railway (later the Kent and East Sussex Railway).

The railways were planned, and some later run, from an office at 23 Salford Terrace in Tonbridge, Kent, which Stephens had rented in 1900 and purchased in 1927.

Many of his railways stayed independent of the larger systems created in the Grouping under the Railways Act 1921.

Stephens had no close relatives and never married. He had few interests outside of railways other than voluntary military service and Liberal Party politics, having befriended MP for Caernarfon David Lloyd George during Stephens' period as Manager of the Welsh Highland Railway and Ffestiniog Railway between 1925 and 1931. In 1916, during World War I, Stephens attained the rank of Lieutenant-Colonel in the Territorial Army (TA) with which he had been associated since the 1890s. He continued to support the TA throughout most of the 1920s.

When he died in 1931 aged 62, the management of his railways was taken over by his assistant and life partner W. H. Austen, who ran them until they closed or were incorporated into the national system in 1948.

A museum devoted to his life and achievements is at Tenterden Station in Kent.

== The railways ==
There are several books about Col. Stephens's railways. The railways in which Stephens was involved were:

Name	Year opened	Year closed	Passenger services start	Passenger services end	Gauge	Notes
Ashover Light Railway	1924	1950	1925	1936	1 ft 11 1/2 in (597 mm)	Built primarily to carry stone
Burry Port and Gwendraeth Valley Railway	1859	1996	1913	1953	4 ft 8 1/2 in (1,435 mm) standard gauge	Originally coal-carrying, adapted for passenger traffic by Stephens; absorbed by Great Western Railway 1923
Cranbrook and Paddock Wood Railway	1892	1961			4 ft 8 1/2 in	Worked by, and absorbed by the South Eastern Railway in 1900. Stephen's first assignment following his training. Also known as the Hawkhurst Branch Line
East Kent Light Railway	1911	1980s	1916	1948	4 ft 8 1/2 in	Built to serve the Kent Coalfield; branch to Richborough; part now a heritage railway
Edge Hill Light Railway	1919	1925	none	none	4 ft 8 1/2 in	Ironstone-carrying; included a 1 in 6 cable-worked incline; never formally opened
Festiniog Railway	1832	Open			1 ft 11 1/2 in	Managed by Stephens c1923-1931, now a heritage railway
Isle of Wight Central Railway	1887	1966			4 ft 8 1/2 in	Stephens was Engineer and Locomotive Superintendent for a brief period in 1911.
Kent and East Sussex Railway and Rother Valley Railway	1900	1961	1900	1954	4 ft 8 1/2 in	Now a heritage railway
North Devon and Cornwall Junction Light Railway	1925	1982	1925	1965	4 ft 8 1/2 in	Originally a 3 ft (914 mm) china-clay carrier; Stephens engineered its reconstruction and extension; operated by Southern Railway at outset, remaining an independent company until nationalisation
Plymouth, Devonport and South Western Junction Railway	1890	1966 (part)			4 ft 8 1/2 in	Built by an independent company but operated by the London and South Western Railway as part of its main line The branch from Bere Alston to Callington was engineered by Stephens and opened in 1908 section to Gunnislake is still operating
Rye and Camber Tramway	1895	1939			3 ft (914 mm)	Used intermittently by military during World War II and never reopened
Sheppey Light Railway	1896	1950			4 ft 8 1/2 in (1,435 mm)	Engineered by Stephens but operated by the South Eastern and Chatham Railway, which took ownership in 1905
Shropshire and Montgomeryshire Railway (S&MR)	1866	1960		1933	4 ft 8 1/2 in	Reconstructed from the long-closed Potteries, Shrewsbury and North Wales Railway in 1911. Regular passenger services ceased 1933. Taken over for military use during World War II and remained under military control until closure.
Snailbeach District Railways	1877	1962			2 ft 3 3/4 in (705 mm)	Lead- and later stone-carrying railway
Welsh Highland Railway	1923	1936			1 ft 11 1/2 in	Incorporating the North Wales Narrow Gauge Railway (opened 1877). Rebuilt 1997 – 2011 as a heritage line.
West Sussex Railway	1897	1935			4 ft 8 1/2 in	The "Hundred of Manhood and Selsey Tramway"
Weston, Clevedon and Portishead Railway	1897	1940			4 ft 8 1/2 in	Extension opened 1907

== Other projects ==
Stephens was involved in many projects that did not come to fruition, 18 of which reached the early, light railway order, stage. Many were extensions to existing railways; one was the 1920s 'Southern Heights Light Railway', a single-track electrified railway from Orpington to Sanderstead.

He was involved in:

- Central Essex Railway
- East Kent Light Railway Extensions
- East Sussex Railway
- Gower Railway
- Hadlow Railway
- Headcorn and Faversham Junction Railway
- Headcorn and Maidstone Junction Railway
- Hedingham and Long Melford Railway
- Kelvedon, Coggeshall and Halstead Railway
- Lands End, St Just and Great Western Junction Railway
- Long Melford and Hadleigh Railway
- Maidstone and Faversham Junction Railway
- Maidstone and Sittingbourne Railway
- Newport and Four Ashes Railway
- Orpington, Cudham and Tatsfield Railway
- Shropshire Railways (Shrewsbury and Market Drayton Extension)
- Southern Heights Light Railway
- Surrey and Sussex Railway
- Worcester and Broom Railway

== Locomotives ==
The majority of the locomotives were second-hand, but a few were bought new from Hawthorn Leslie and Company including:

Railway	No.	Loco name	HL Works No.	Build date	Wheels	Disposal	BR number
KESR	1	Tenterden	2420	1899	2-4-0T	Scrapped 1941	—
KESR	2	Rolvenden	2421	1899	2-4-0T	Scrapped 1941	—
KESR	4	Hecate	2587	1904	0-8-0T	to SR and BR	30949
PDSWJR		A. S. Harris		1907	0-6-0T	to SR and BR	30756
PDSWJR		Earl of Mount Edgcumbe		1907	0-6-2T	to SR and BR	30757
PDSWJR		Lord St. Levan		1907	0-6-2T	to SR and BR	30758
SMR		Pyramus		1911	0-6-2T	sold c.1916	—
SMR		Thisbe		1911	0-6-2T	sold c.1916	—

None of these has been preserved.
