= Hook-a-Gate =

Village in Shropshire, England

Coordinates: 52.676°N 2.794°W

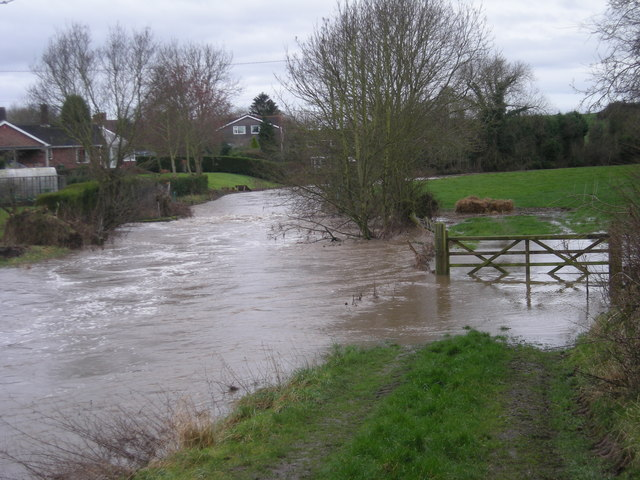
- The Rea Brook in flood at Hook-a-Gate

- Location within Shropshire
- OS grid reference: SJ463090
- Civil parish: Longden
- Unitary authority: Shropshire
- Ceremonial county: Shropshire
- Region: West Midlands
- Country: England
- Sovereign state: United Kingdom
- Post town: SHREWSBURY
- Postcode district: SY5
- Dialling code: 01743
- Police: West Mercia
- Fire: Shropshire
- Ambulance: West Midlands
- UK Parliament: Shrewsbury and Atcham

Hook-a-Gate is a village in Shropshire, England. It is located on the Shrewsbury to Longden road, a little to the south of the A5 Shrewsbury bypass from Shrewsbury itself. Bayston Hill is nearby, though there is no direct vehicular road connecting the two villages, only a track. It was formerly a stop on the now defunct Shropshire and Montgomeryshire Railway.

The Rea brook flows through the village. The hamlet of Redhill adjoins the village, on the north side of the Rea Brook.

The village is served by one public house - the New Inn. Until 2014, the Mucky Duck (formerly Cygnets) also served as a public house in the village.
