= Shropshire and Montgomeryshire Light Railway =

Railway line in England and Wales

The Shropshire and Montgomeryshire Light Railway (S&MLR) was a railway running from Shrewsbury, England to Llanymynech, Wales, with a branch to Criggion. It was promoted by Holman Fred Stephens, better known as Colonel Stephens, proprietor of several ultra-low budget light railways. It adopted the track network of the defunct Potteries, Shrewsbury and North Wales Railway that had closed in 1880; the S&MLR opened in 1911. Running through sparsely inhabited terrain, it struggled to achieve financial stability, and following a serious deterioration of maintenance conditions, it closed to passengers in 1933, continuing with a basic goods and mineral service.

During World War II, the line was taken over by the War Department in 1941, and extensively reconstructed to serve Central Ammunition Depot Nesscliffe. It was finally closed in 1960.

== First railway ==
Richard Samuel France was the proprietor of important limestone quarries at Nantmawr and elsewhere in Powys, then Montgomeryshire. He needed to get the quarry output to a railway terminal for onward transit, and he promoted a railway to achieve this. The idea developed and became a public concern, the Potteries, Shrewsbury and North Wales Railway. The title indicated the far-reaching ambitions of the company, but in fact it only stretched from Shrewsbury to Llanymynech, Nantmawr and Criggion, a network of 28 miles. The line opened in 1866. It was informally known as the Potts Line.

The line never attracted enough business to make a profit, and basic maintenance was cut back due to the lack of cash. The system became dangerous and was closed down in 1880 on safety grounds. An attempt at financial reconstruction was made in 1888, and a new company titled The Shropshire Railways was created. Shareholders in the Potts Company transferred their holding into the Shropshire Railway Company, and it took possession of the dormant assets on 19 September 1890, but it too failed to achieve anything; an official receiver was appointed in 1891, and no further railway activity took place.

== Revival: Shropshire and Montgomeryshire Railway ==
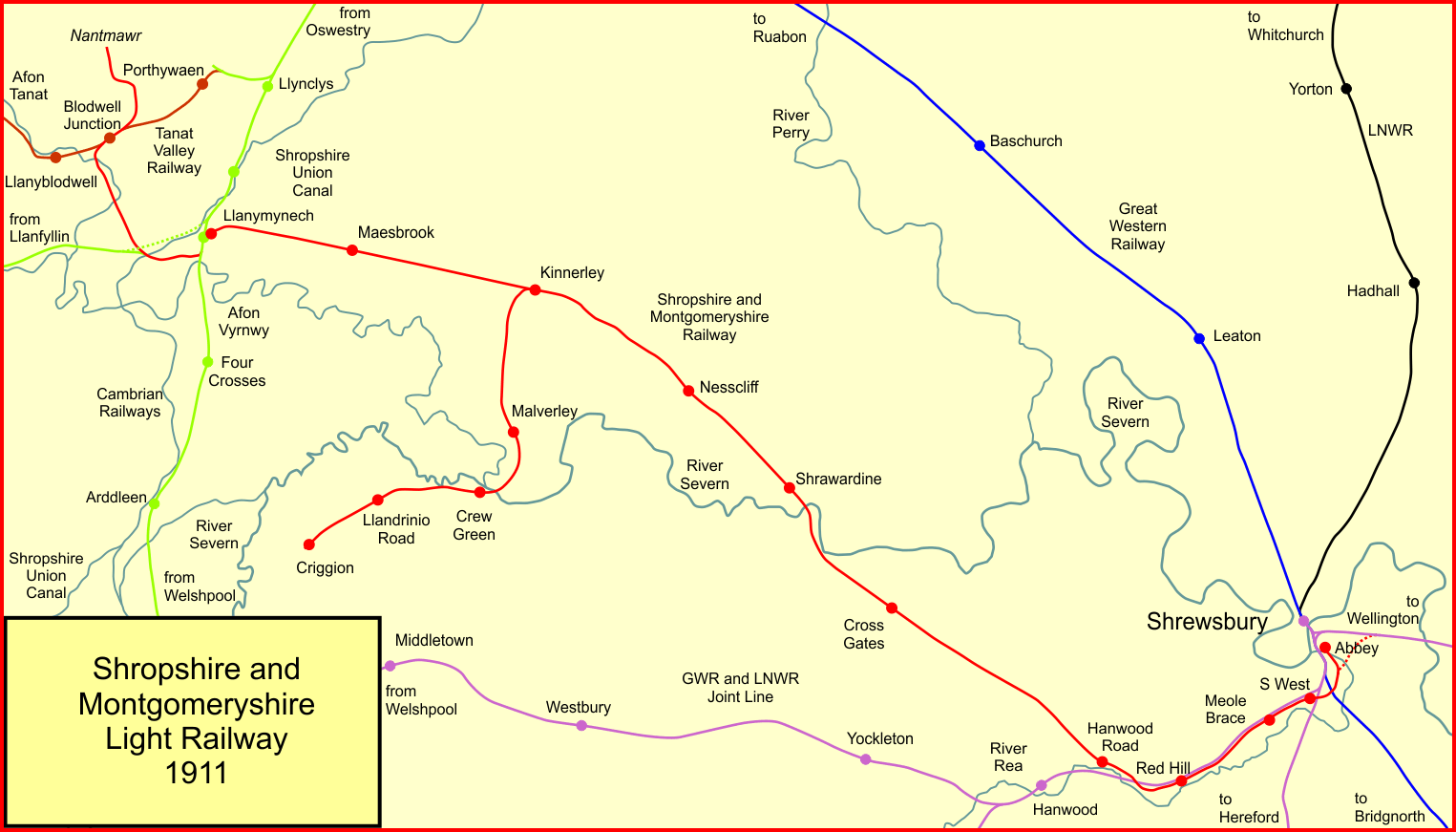
The Shropshire and Montgomeryshire Light Railway system in 1911

The Potts network other than the Nantmawr branch had been dormant since 1880. In 1907 Holman Fred Stephens, later Colonel Stephens, already had several light railways in his control. All of them were only marginally profitable, and that by the most stringent economy. Stephens decided that the Potteries Line could be revived as a light railway. He obtained the Shropshire and Montgomeryshire Light Railway Order 1909 on 17 January 1908, authorising the operation of all the Shropshire Railways system except the Nantmawr branch as a light railway. The new company was to be called the Shropshire and Montgomeryshire Light Railway. Several local authorities (the county and some rural district councils) made 40-year loans. The Shropshire Railways company continued in existence as owner of the land.

The formal re-opening of the line took place on 13 April 1911, this time with invited guests. Opening to the general public took place the following day.

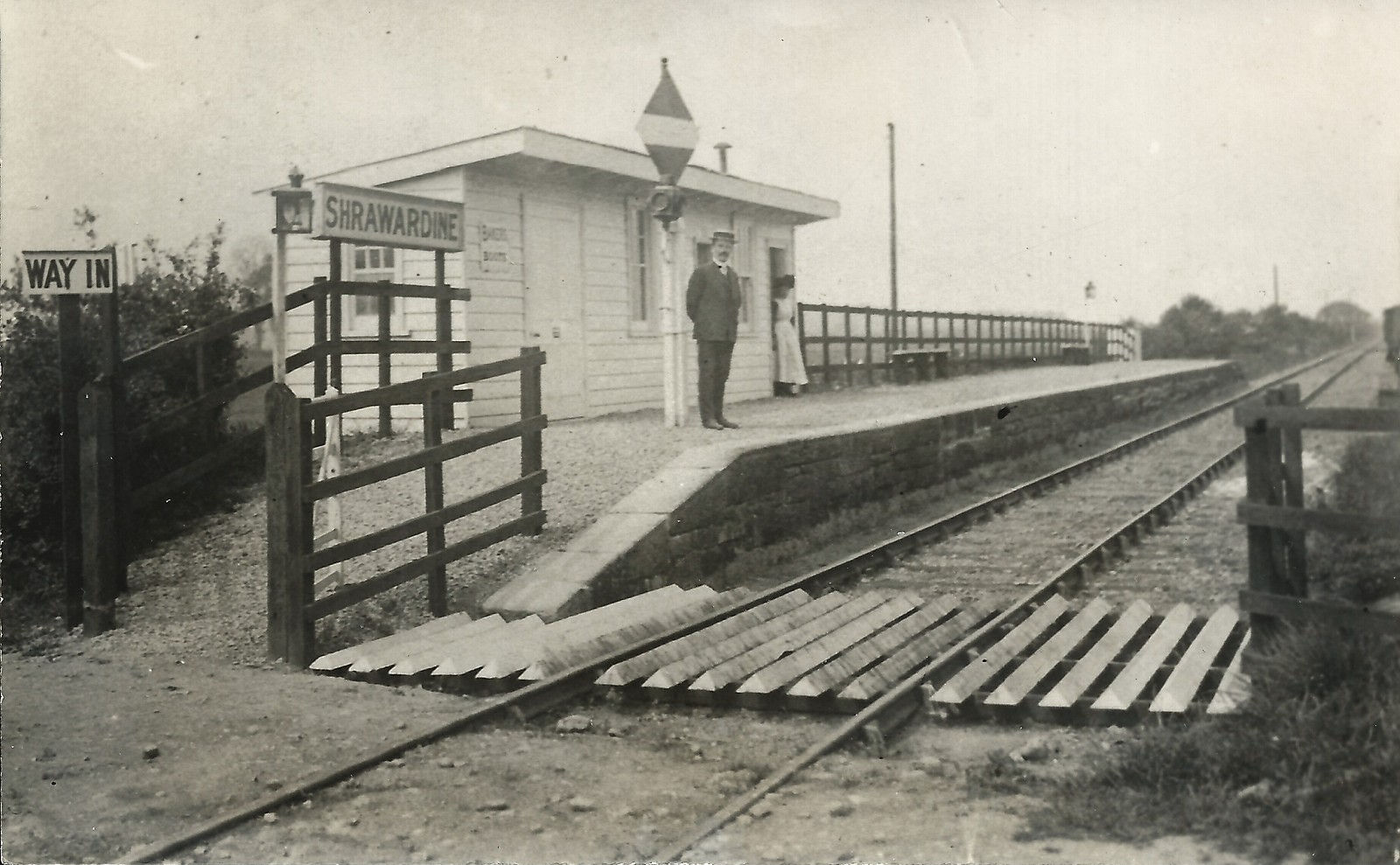
Shrawardine station in 1911

In the first six months of operation, an operating profit of £404 was made, but after payment of debenture holders a net surplus of less than £1 remained.

The Criggion branch opened for goods and mineral traffic on 21 February 1912, and for passengers in August 1912.

== Decline ==
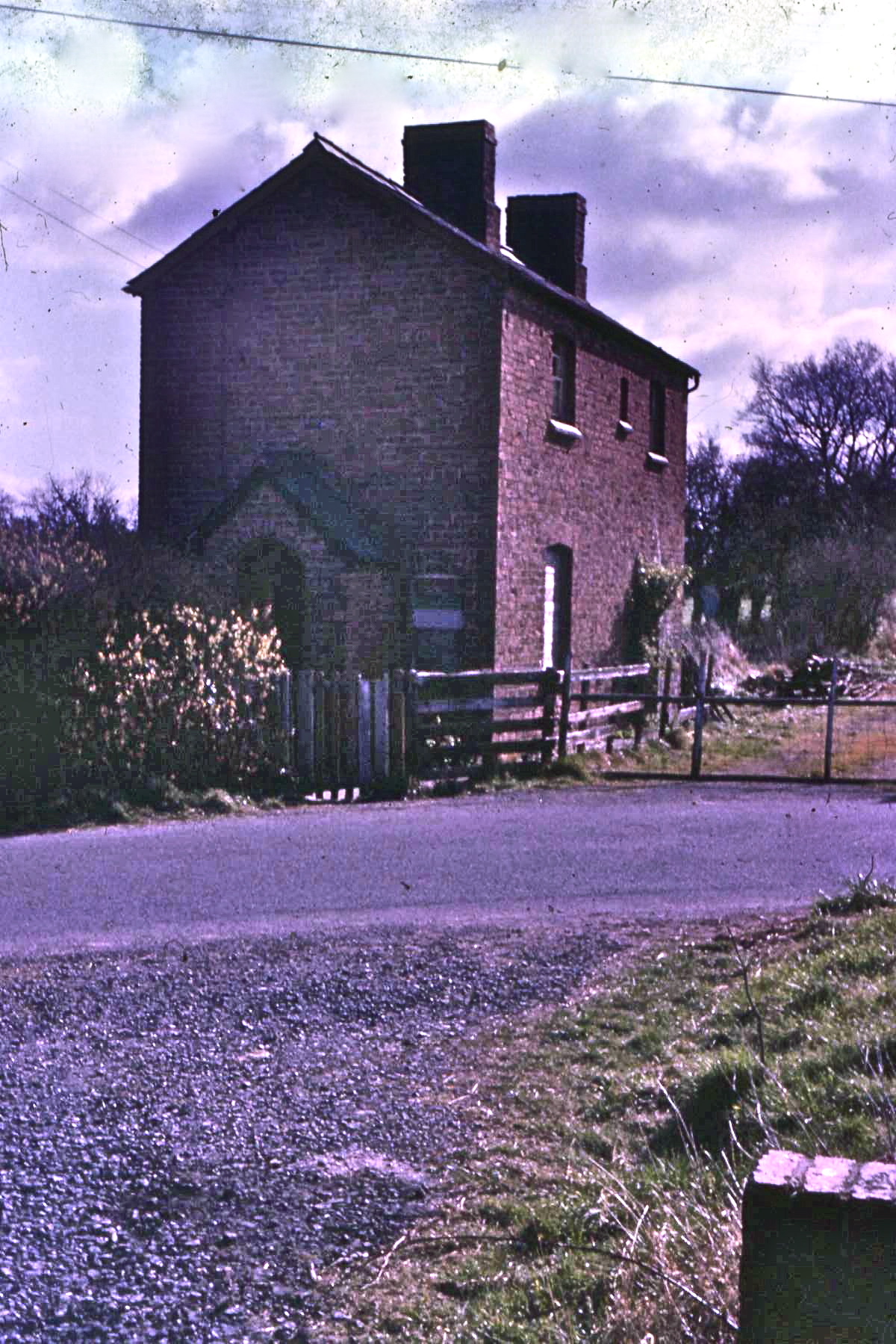
Shoot Hill in 1967

In the early 1920s Stephens introduced two back to back railcar sets, a Ford pair and a Wolseley-Siddeley pair, reducing costs considerably. However they were not successful, and they were withdrawn after a short period in service.

Passenger operation beyond Melverley ceased in October 1932, due to the unsafe state of the bridge over the River Severn. As there was no run-round facility at Melverley, now a terminus, the train from Kinnerley propelled a single coach on the outward trip.

All passenger operation, except for occasional excursions, was discontinued on 6 November 1933. The Criggion quarry train ran weekly, and occasional ordinary goods traffic served the intermediate stations.

It appears that the Shropshire Railways Company continued in existence as owner of the former Potts system, suggesting that the S&MLR was a tenant. The Shropshire Railways received the rental for the Nantmawr branch from the Cambrian Railways, and later from the Great Western Railway. Neither the Shropshire Railways nor the Shropshire and Montgomeryshire Light Railway were subject to the "Grouping" process in 1923 (following the Railways Act 1921).

== Military use ==
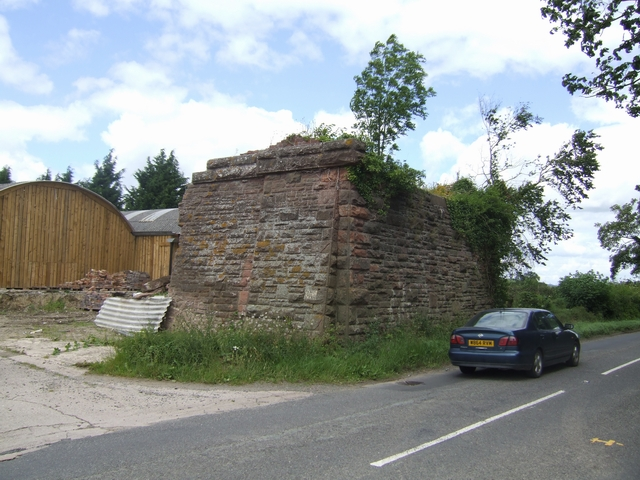
The remains of the bridge abutments at Cruckton which carried the Nesscliffe line from Redhill Junction on the Shropshire and Montgomeryshire Line.

In 1941, the entire line except the Criggion branch was requisitioned by the War Department and established as an ammunition store. Extensive track renewal took place. Army steam engines were brought in to service numerous storage depots that were set up. A new exchange location with the main line was established at Hookagate.

From 1 June 1941, the War Department operated all trains on the line, military and civilian.

However the Criggion branch remained outside the scope of War Department control; there was a daily train conveying granite from the Breidden quarries. In 1945 Melverley viaduct showed obvious signs of weakness and imminent collapse. At first the wagons were pushed up to and over the bridge by the quarry company's vertical-boilered Sentinel locomotive, to be collected on the Kinnerley side by the S&MLR engine. Later the Sentinel engine was allowed to cross the bridge at walking pace and take the train all the way to Kinnerley.

In 1947, the line was returned to civilian status, and the company was nationalised in 1948. The War Department usage continued, until in 1959 that came to an end, and in December 1959 the Criggion stone traffic ceased to operate as well. The final scheduled train ran on 26 February 1960 and on 29 February the line was closed. Abbey goods yard at Shrewsbury was retained.

The Nantmawr branch too continued as part of British Railways, served from Oswestry via Blodwell Junction.

== Station list from 1911 ==
=== Main line ===
- Shrewsbury Abbey; closed 6 November 1933;
- Shrewsbury West; closed 6 November 1933;
- Meole Brace; closed 6 November 1933;
- Red Hill; renamed Hookagate 1 April 1921; renamed Hookagate and Redhill 1927; closed 6 November 1933;
- Hanwood Road; renamed Edgebold 1 April 1921; closed 6 November 1933;
- Cruckton; opened July 1913; closed 6 November 1933;
- Shoot Hill; opened November 1921; closed 6 November 1933;
- Ford and Crossgates; closed 6 November 1933;
- Shrawardine; closed 6 November 1933;
- Nesscliff; renamed Nesscliff & Pentre 1 June 1913; closed 6 November 1933;
- Edgerley; opened 16 June 1927; closed 6 November 1933;
- Kinnerley Junction; closed 6 November 1933;
- Wern Las; opened December 1919; closed 6 November 1933;
- Maesbrook; closed 6 November 1933;
- Llanymynech Junction; closed 6 November 1933.

=== Criggion branch ===
- Kinnerley Junction; above;
- Chapel Lane; opened August 1920; closed 6 November 1933;
- Melverley; closed 6 November 1933;
- Crewe Green; renamed Crew Green 1920; closed 3 October 1932;
- Llandrinio Road; closed 3 October 1932;
- Criggion; closed 3 October 1932.
