= Criggion =

Village in Powys, Wales

Coordinates: 52.72710°N 3.04832°W

Criggion (Welsh: Crugion) is a village in Powys, Wales. Criggion Radio Station was located nearby. A branch of the now defunct Shropshire and Montgomeryshire Railway terminated at Criggion.

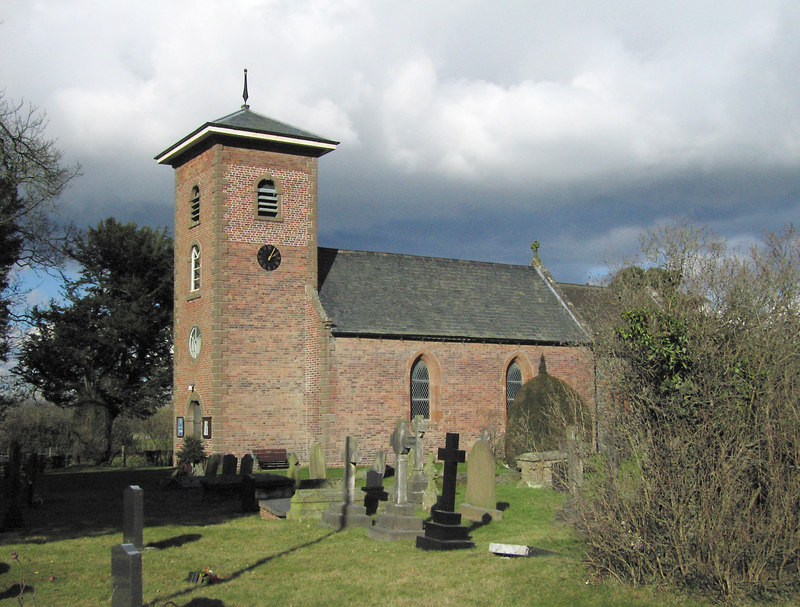
St Michael and All Angel's church

St Michael and All Angels's church was built in red brick in 1770 and a stone-built chancel added in the mid-19th century. It is a grade II* listed building.
