= Baldwin Class 10-12-D =

Type of steam locomotive

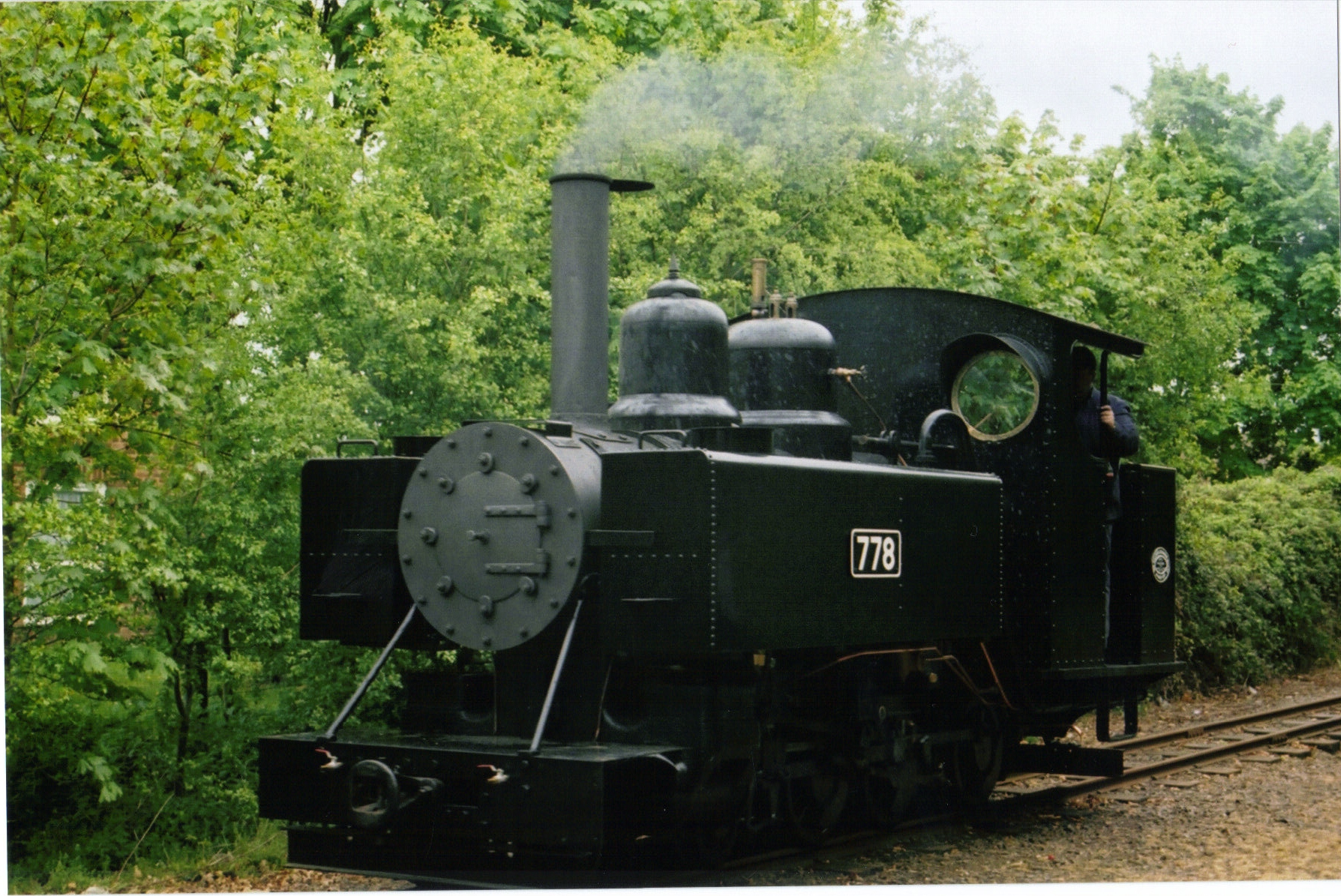
- No. 778, preserved at the Leighton Buzzard Light Railway
Type and origin
- Power type: Steam
- Builder: Baldwin Locomotive Works
- Build date: 1916–1917
Specifications
- Configuration
  - Whyte: 4-6-0PT
  - UIC: 2′C n2t
- Gauge: 600 mm (1 ft 11 5/8 in)
- Leading dia.: 1 ft 4 in (0.406 m)
- Driver dia.: 1 ft 11 1/2 in (0.597 m)
- Wheelbase: Coupled: 5 ft 8 in (1.73 m)
- Loco weight: 14.5 long tons (14.7 t) (see text)
- Fuel type: Coal
- Fuel capacity: 0.75 long tons (0.76 t) (see text)
- Water cap.: 476 US gal (1,800 L; 396 imp gal)
- Boiler pressure: 178 psi (1.23 MPa)
- Cylinders: Two, outside
- Cylinder size: 9 in × 12 in (229 mm × 305 mm)
- Valve gear: Walschaerts (slide valves)
Performance figures
- Tractive effort: 6,328 lbf (28.15 kN)
Career
- Operators: War Department Light Railways, North Western Railway, Welsh Highland Railway, Glyn Valley Tramway, Snailbeach District Railways, Ashover Light Railway
- Class: 10-12-D
- Nicknames: 'Yankee'
- Preserved: Nos. 608, 633 (Australia), 778, 779, 794,
- Current owner: Ffestiniog Railway (608); Dreamworld (633); Leighton Buzzard Light Railway (778); Statfold Barn Railway (779); Welsh Highland Heritage Railway (794)
- Disposition: 4 known preserved. 1 Preserved in rebuilt form. More known to exist abandoned.

The Baldwin Class 10-12-D is a class of narrow gauge 4-6-0PT steam locomotives built by the Baldwin Locomotive Works (USA) for the British War Department Light Railways for service in France during World War I. They were built in 1916–1917 to 600 mm (1 ft 11 5/8 in) gauge.

== Origins of the type ==
The Belgians had designed 600 mm gauge 4-6-2T locomotives as early as in 1900–1901 for Chemins de fer du Calvados. The prototype was Tubize factory type 73. Weidknecht used these drawings and built similar 11-ton locomotives with subcontracted boilers, presumably built by S.A.Energie, Marcinelle.

The French military circles became interested in this 4-6-2T locomotive type for their Decauville Light Military Railways in Morocco. An enlarged 14-ton type was designed and an order was placed for Weidknecht to produce these locomotives for the 600 mm gauge lines in Morocco.

Weidknecht delivered 10 more in 1913 for Chemins de fer Militaires du Maroc numbered (W1-W5 and 1-5).

== Baldwin built locomotives ==
=== For the French Government ===
When the Great War broke out in August 1914 the French lost most of their locomotive building capacity in Northern France to the German-occupied area. Therefore, the French Army demanded fast replacement of the locomotive building capacity for their useful 2′C n2t type which had proved to be a reliable locomotive type for the lightly laid military railways.

Three steam locomotive type drawings were sent to Baldwin Works (finance guaranteed by the French Government) for production of C n2t, 2′C n2t, and light Mallet B′B n4v for 600 mm (1 ft 11 5/8 in) gauge lines. With the usual American liberty, Baldwin Drawing Office produced their "version Americaine" of these locomotive types. The first C n2t (based to Decauville design) came out in November 1914 and the first batch of 2′C n2t in January 1915. Only two more batches were built for the French.

=== For the British War Office ===
The British War Office decided to adopt the type as its principal military steam locomotive, and Baldwin started production in 1916, building 495 locomotives between October 1916 and April 1917. All were delivered except for nine which were lost at sea.

== Use outside Europe ==
Some of the class found during war their way to other theatres of war than Europe. Baldwin 45163–45222 from batch No 1001–1104 were renumbered by the British War Office to War Department Light Railways, Middle East No 581–640 and were shipped to Egypt to be used in Sinai and Palestine during the British 1917 offensive against the Turks. After the war most of them remained in Middle East.

== Peacetime service ==
After the war many of these locomotives were sold and went on to work in France, Britain and India. Indian North Western Railway received fifty locomotives, numbered NWR No 1–50, many of which later operated at sugar mills in various parts of the country. British narrow-gauge railways which used them included:

- Welsh Highland Railway
- Glyn Valley Tramway
- Snailbeach District Railways
- Ashover Light Railway
- Rainham Cement Works in Kent

== Preservation ==
Four Baldwin Class 10-12-D locomotives have been preserved in the UK, all of which had been imported from India:

- No. 608, (Works No.45190 of 1917) repatriated along with No.779 in 2013, currently at the Ffestiniog Railway
- No. 778, (Works No.44656 of 1917) Leighton Buzzard Light Railway
- No. 779, (Works No.44657 of 1917), repatriated in March 2013, at Workshop X - Killamarsh Dec 2020
- No. 794, (Works No.44699 of 1917) Welsh Highland Heritage Railway

No. 778 is operational at its home base, No.794 has been restored at the Vale of Rheidol Railway for the WHHR as Baldwin 590, works No. 45190 (WDLR 608) is currently at the Ffestiniog and Welsh Highland Railways (having been restored in 2018), and works No. 44657 is undergoing restoration at the SBR.

No. 633 (Baldwin 45215 of 1917), is preserved on the Dreamworld Railway in Coomera, Queensland, Australia. This locomotive worked on a sugar mill in Mackay and prior to the opening of Dreamworld in 1981 after purchase was heavily modified, adding a tender and a Wild-West style chimney, as well as being converted into an oil-firing locomotive. The locomotive was retired from active service in 2013 and is now on display outside the Central Park Station.

One other locomotive, No. 973 (Baldwin 45010 of 1917) is currently located in Volos, Greece.

Three class 10-12-D locomotives were rebuilt as diesel locomotives in France in 1954. One of these was preserved and now resides at Tacot des Lacs.

== Models ==
Bachmann Branchline have produced the Baldwin Class 10-12-D in 009 gauge in 10 liveries with liveries including War department livery, Ashover Light Railway, Glyn Valley Tramway, Snailbeach District Railways, Southern Railway and Welsh Highland Railway liveries. Minitrains also produce models of the similar Baldwin War Department 2-6-2PTs in 009.

== See also ==
- British narrow-gauge railways
- Trench railway
