= Narrow gauge railways in the United Kingdom =

Narrow-gauge railways in the United Kingdom could refer to:

- British narrow-gauge railways
  - Category:Narrow-gauge railways in England
  - Category:Narrow-gauge railways in Scotland
  - Category:Narrow-gauge railways in Wales
- Category:Narrow-gauge railways in Northern Ireland

== See also ==
- Category:Narrow-gauge railways in the Isle of Man
