= Duchal Moor Railway =

Estate railway in Inverclyde, Scotland

The Duchal Moor Railway was a 2 ft (610 mm) narrow-gauge railway built in the 1920s to carry shooting parties to the grouse moors of Duchal Moor and the Muirshiel Hills, within the Clyde Muirshiel Regional Park, 3 miles (5 km) west-southwest of Kilmacolm in Scotland. It closed in the late 1970s.

Location of the Duchal Moors Railway

== History and infrastructure ==
This narrow-gauge railway, known locally as the Grouse Moor line, was built for the transport of grouse-shooting parties and their equipment by Sir James Lithgow, 1st Baronet, of shipbuilding fame. The project was undertaken to keep men employed after a drop in ship orders following World War I. The line was used to take grouse-shooting parties into the hills across hundreds of acres of boggy moorland. The Duchal Moor is associated with the old Duchal Castle and the Lyle and Porterfield families.

The Grouse Railway, following the contours of the hills, was designed to convey the shooting parties around the grouse moor to the various groups of shooting butts; the grouse-shooting season starts on the Glorious Twelfth (12 August) and continues through to December. It was completed around 1922 and extends for 7 miles (11 km). It is clearly marked on the appropriate OS maps.

The 2 ft (610 mm) narrow-gauge tracks were a combination of ex-First World War and former colliery light railway track, supported on wooden sleepers made from dismantled warships. The line started at Hardridge Farm, where the engines and passenger carriages were kept, and had three branches – one northwards to the Laverock Stone, another westwards to the Laird's Seat and the third southwards to Smeath Hill.

== Locomotives ==
Two 20 hp (15 kW) wheeled, 2 ft (610 mm) narrow-gauge petrol-driven locomotives were purchased in 1922 from the Motor Rail & Tramcar Company of Bedford – Works Numbers 2097 and 2171. The company had already equipped the similar Dalmunzie Railway 'grouse railway' in 1920 for Sir Archie Birkmyre of Dalmunzie near Glenshee.

King Edward VIII was among guests to make use of the railway.

In September 1969 a further four-wheeled 20/28 HP diesel locomotive (Works No 8700 of 1941) was purchased second-hand from Joseph Arnold Ltd's sand quarries in Leighton Buzzard.

== Remains ==
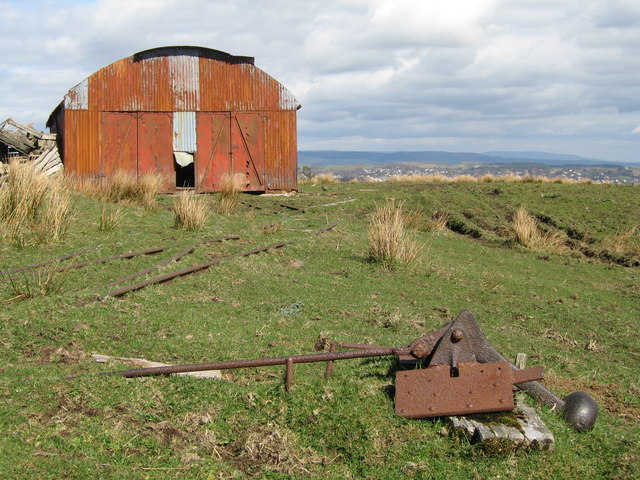
The engine shed and a point lever in 2007

The railway closed in the late 1970s and is now derelict. The engine shed is still present (2021), as are parts of the station platform and many of the rails are still in situ; most, however, are buried in the peat.

The route to the north of Hardridge Hill has been lifted; the rest of the route is largely intact, although the track itself is obscured by moor growth and can only be detected in places as a depression in the peat. The eastern triangular junction is largely complete and crossed by a recent dirt road. The points remain at all three corners, with the weighted point lever. The line to the south crosses a small viaduct, the largest such structure on the railway. The western triangular junction is more overgrown than the eastern one. The western points here are overgrown completely, but the western and southern points can be found. The southern points still work. There is a siding at Lairds Seat.

== See also ==
- British narrow gauge railways
