= Snailbeach District Railways =

British narrow gauge railway in Shropshire

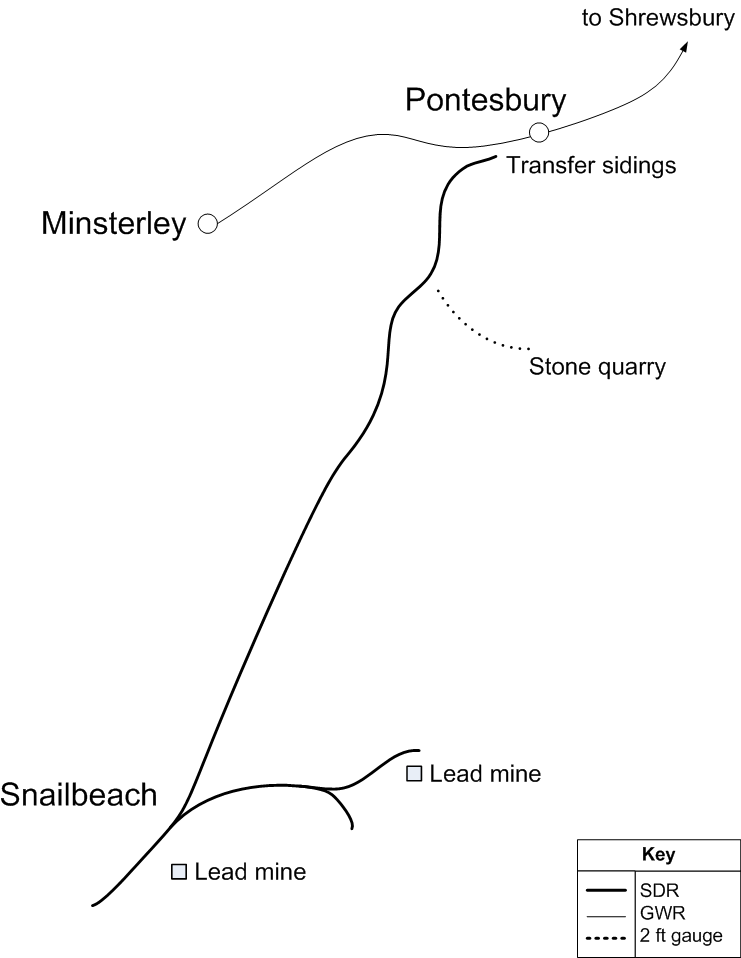
- Map of the Snailbeach District Railways

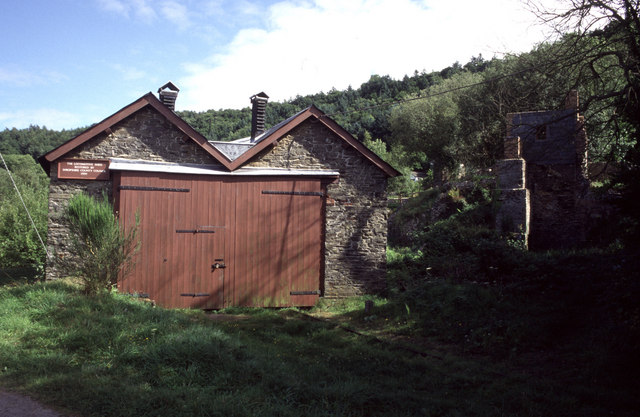
- The locomotive shed at Snailbeach

Overview
- Headquarters: Tonbridge until 1948
- Locale: England
- Dates of operation: 1877–1959 (rail operation)
- Successor: abandoned

Technical
- Track gauge: 2 ft 4 in (711 mm) ^{[a]}
- Length: 3 1/2 miles (5.63 km)

The Snailbeach District Railways was a British narrow gauge railway in Shropshire. It was constructed to transport lead ore from mines in the Stiperstones to Pontesbury, where the ore was transshipped to the Great Western Railway's Minsterley branch line. Coal from the Pontesford coal mines travelled in the opposite direction. The line ended at Snailbeach, home to Shropshire's largest and richest lead mine. Although there were plans to extend it further, which would have brought it closer to more lead mines, the extension was never completed.

== History ==
Snailbeach District Railways Act 1873
- Act of Parliament
- Parliament of the United Kingdom
- Long title: An Act for making a Railway from Pontesbury to Snailbeach and Tankerville in the county of Salop.
- Citation: 36 & 37 Vict. c. ccxxxi

Dates
- Royal assent: 5 August 1873

Text of statute as originally enacted

The railway was incorporated by an act of Parliament, the Snailbeach District Railways Act 1873 (36 & 37 Vict. c. ccxxxi), on 5 August 1873 and opened in 1877. It was built with an unusual gauge of 2 ft 4 in (711 mm). The line was prosperous at first, carrying 14,000 long tons (14,225 t; 15,680 short tons) annually and paying a 3% dividend. However, in 1884, the Tankerville Great Consols Company mine, the largest user of the railway, closed, and tonnage fell to 5,500 long tons (5,588 t; 6,160 short tons).

In 1905, the Ceirog Granite Company opened a quarry near Habberley, and a branch was built to serve this. An extra locomotive was required, and 0-4-2T Sir Theodore was borrowed from the 2 ft 4 1/2 in (724 mm) gauge Glyn Valley Tramway. However, the slight difference in gauge made this locomotive too wide for the track, and it was returned unused. Instead, a new locomotive, Dennis, was bought.

Freight reached a peak in 1909 when 38,000 long tons (38,610 t; 42,560 short tons) were carried, but this proved to be a short-term change in fortune for the railway, and demand dwindled again during World War I. In 1923 it was taken over and re-equipped by Colonel Stephens. Stephens bought two new Baldwin locomotives from the War Department Light Railways.

When the mines closed, the line lost much of its traffic but was rescued by a new traffic flow of stone from Callow Hill Quarry. There was virtually no traffic on the upper part of the line but it remained open as the locomotive shed was at Snailbeach.

In 1947 all three remaining steam locomotives were unusable and the railway was moribund. The locomotives were cut up at Snailbeach in 1950. The lower section was leased by Shropshire County Council who used it to transport road-building materials from Callow Hill Quarry to Pontesbury. When the last steam locomotive failed, loaded wagons were run from the quarry to Pontesbury by gravity, and then, when enough were ready, hauled back using a Fordson tractor straddling the rails. The railway finally closed in 1959, the last railway equipment being scrapped in 1961. The Talyllyn Railway purchased the remaining track.

The quarry remained open but the railway was lifted and, between Callow Hill and the road bridge at Pontesbury, converted into a road. Shropshire County Council ran their lorries along this road and paid rent to the railway company. As lorries became larger the long single-track road from Callow Lane to the quarry became impractical and was closed. A new access road was built in 1998 from the A488 in Pontesbury to the quarry at Callow Hill, when the quarry was extended and deepened. Shropshire County Council sold the quarry to Tarmac plc, in 2003. Quarrying permission existed until 2013. As at late 2006 there was no active work at the quarry and most heavy machinery had been removed.

== Line preservation ==
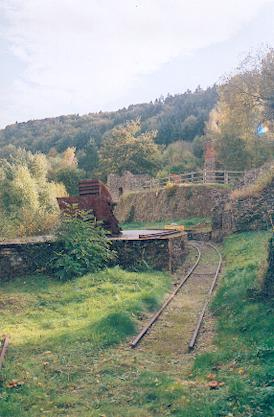
A short section of the track still in situ in 2005

The railway company was still in existence in 1984 when it was put up for sale (offers in the region of £25,000). The sale included the company records as well as the land. The only parts that were sold were the Callow Hill quarry and the trackbed from the exchange sidings at Pontesbury through to Callow Lane near Minsterley. A small section of land was sold to private purchasers at Snailbeach (near Prospect House and Cottages) and the Crowsnest terminal. A small section near the Plox Green road bridge is owned by Shropshire Council and is said to be lead contaminated due to drainage from the spoil piles. A small parcel of land covering the trackbed on the other side of this bridge is used as a playing field and the Snailbeach Village Hall.

Income was expected from the lease to the county council (lasting until 1997) and from wayleaves for services laid along the old trackbed.

Callow Hill Quarry (2006) is owned by Tarmac plc and largely mothballed. Occasional quarry products are transported only a short distance along the route of the old railway to a public road (A488) leading to Pontesbury.

Some remnants of the railway can still be seen, notably in Snailbeach, where the engine shed has been restored and rails remain in place on the lines leading to the old mines, and a reconstructed hopper wagon is available for inspection.

== Locomotives ==
Number	Name	Builder	Type	Works Number	Built	Bought	Notes
	Belmont	Hughes Falcon Works	0-4-2ST		1874 (?)	1877	Scrapped c.1912
	Fernhill	Lennox Lange	0-6-0ST		1881	1881	Scrapped c.1906
1	Dennis	W.G. Bagnall	0-6-0T	1797	1906	1906	Scrapped 1937
2		Kerr Stuart	0-4-2T "Skylark" class	802	1902	1923	Scrapped 1950
3		Baldwin Locomotive Works	4-6-0PT class 10-12-D	44383	1916	1923	Scrapped 1950
4		Baldwin Locomotive Works	4-6-0PT class 10-12-D	44522	1917	1923	Scrapped 1950

== See also ==
- British narrow gauge railways
- Baldwin Class 10-12-D

== Notes ==
^{a} At least one source lists the gauge as 2 ft 3 3/4 in (705 mm).
