= Dalmunzie Railway =

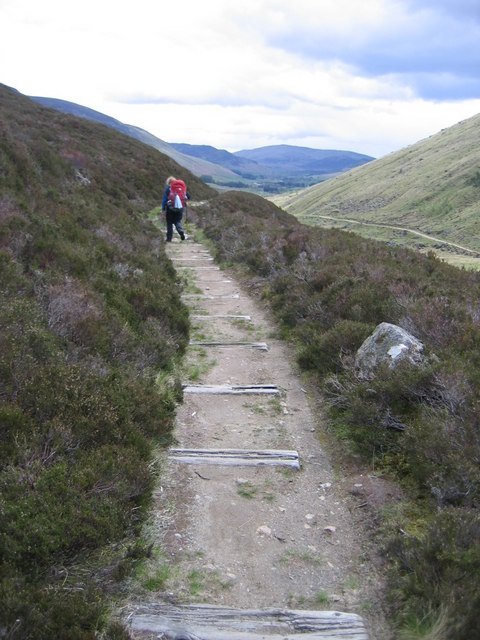
Remains of tramway to Glenlochsie Lodge

The Dalmunzie Railway was a narrow-gauge railway in Glen Shee, in the UK.

== History ==
The railway was built to allow grouse shooters to easily access grouse moors from the Dalmunzie Hotel; it ran to the Glenlochsie shooting lodge. It was inaugurated in 1920, and it was closed in 1978 or 1979.

== Details ==
The railway gauge was 2 feet 6 inches, and the line was 2 1/2 miles (4.0 km) long. Journeys took about 25 minutes, and the oil-fired locomotive was driven by ghillies.

== See also ==
- Duchal Moor Railway
- British narrow gauge railways
