= Glyn Valley Tramway =

Welsh railway in use 1873–1935

Coordinates: 52.9301°N 3.1589°W

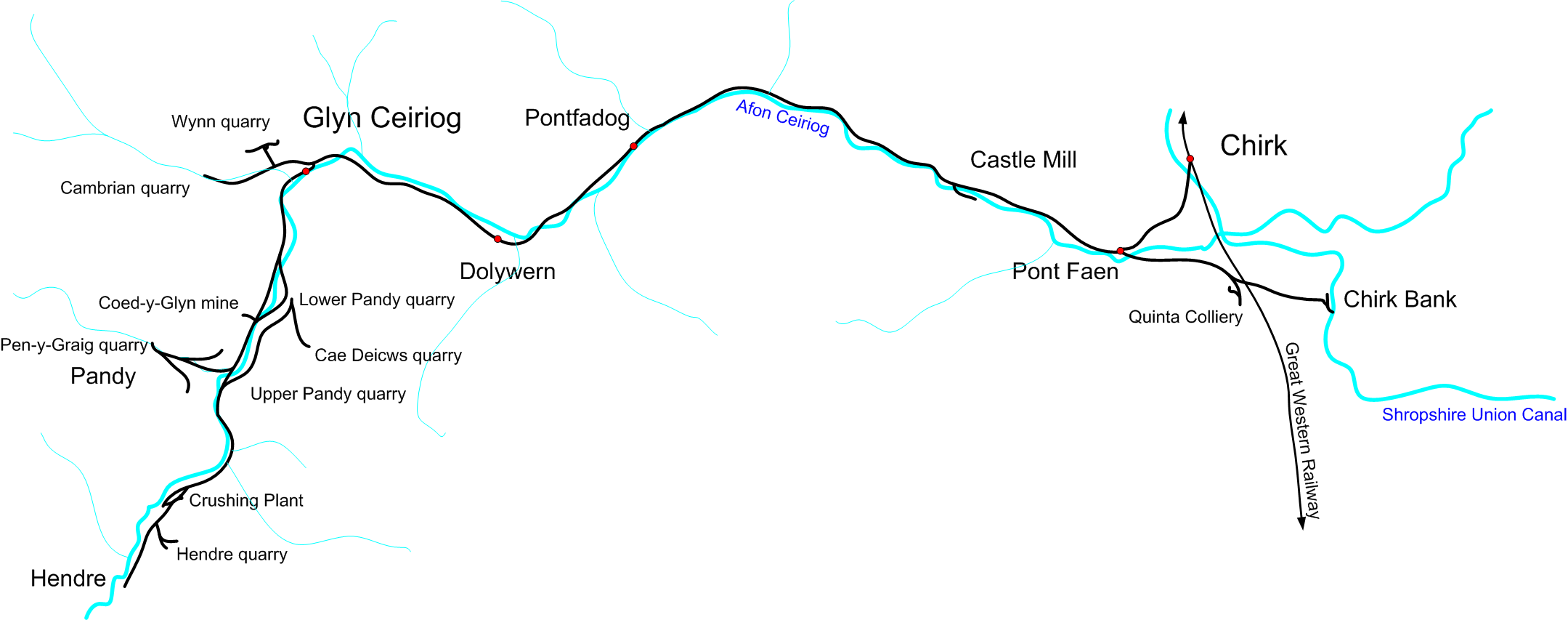
- Route of the Glyn Valley Tramway

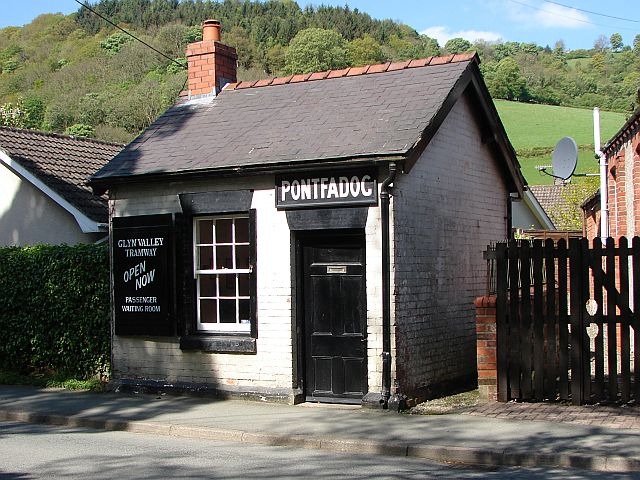
- The original waiting room still stands at Pontfadog

Overview
- Headquarters: Chirk
- Locale: Wales
- Dates of operation: 1873–1935
- Successor: abandoned

Technical
- Track gauge: 2 ft 4 1/2 in (724 mm)
- Length: 8 1/4 miles (13.28 km)

The Glyn Valley Tramway was a narrow-gauge railway that ran through the Ceiriog Valley in north-east Wales, connecting Chirk with Glyn Ceiriog in Denbighshire (now Wrexham County Borough). The gauge of the line was 2 feet 4 1/4 inches (718 mm) while it was horse-drawn, which was unofficially increased to 2 ft 4 1/2 in (724 mm) when steam locomotives were introduced. The total length of the line was 8 1/4 miles (13.3 km), 6 1/2 miles (10.5 km) of which were worked by passenger trains, the remainder serving a large granite quarry and several minor slate quarries.

Tar, Coal and Wood was transported as well along the line using specialised wagons.

== History ==
=== Construction ===
Ellesmere and Glyn Valley Railway Act 1866
- Act of Parliament
- Parliament of the United Kingdom
- Long title: An Act for making a Railway from Ellesmere to Llansaintffraid Glyn Ceiriog; and for other Purposes.
- Citation: 29 & 30 Vict. c. cccxxxv

Dates
- Royal assent: 6 August 1866
Other legislation
Repealed by	Glyn Valley Tramway Act 1870

Status: Repealed

Ellesmere and Glyn Valley Railway Act 1869
- Act of Parliament
- Parliament of the United Kingdom
- Long title: An Act to authorize the abandonment of a certain portion of the railways authorized by The Ellesmere and Glyn Valley Railway Act, 1866, and an extension of time for the compulsory purchase of lands and the completion of other portions of the said railways; and for other purposes.
- Citation: 32 & 33 Vict. c. cli

Dates
- Royal assent: 9 August 1869
Other legislation
Repealed by	Glyn Valley Tramway Act 1870

Status: Repealed

Text of statute as originally enacted

Glyn Valley Tramway Act 1870
- Act of Parliament
- Parliament of the United Kingdom
- Long title: An Act for dissolving the Ellesmere and Glyn Valley Railway Company and reincorporating the same as "The Glyn Valley Tramway Company," with power to construct Tramways; and for other purposes,
- Citation: 33 & 34 Vict. c. clxvi

Dates
- Royal assent: 10 August 1870

Text of statute as originally enacted

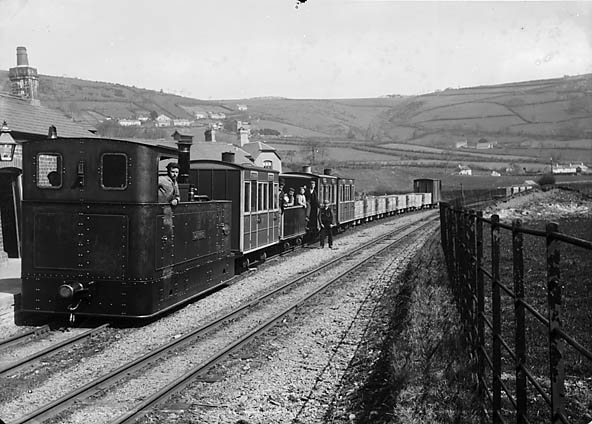
Dennis with a mixed train arriving at Glyn Ceriog in 1890s

The railway was built to connect the quarries at Glyn Ceriog with the Shropshire Union Canal at Chirk. A standard gauge "Ellesmere & Glyn Valley Railway" was authorised by the Ellesmere and Glyn Valley Railway Act 1866 (29 & 30 Vict. c. cccxxxv) of 6 August to run from the Cambrian Railway at Ellesmere to the GWR at Chirk and thence to follow the Glyn Ceiriog road to the quarries. No construction took place and by the Ellesmere and Glyn Valley Railway Act 1869 (32 & 33 Vict. c. cli), the Ellesmere to Chirk portion was abandoned. A further act of Parliament, the Glyn Valley Tramway Act 1870 (33 & 34 Vict. c. clxvi), obtained on 10 August 1870, allowed the original company to be dissolved, and the Glyn Valley Tramway to be incorporated to take over the rights, assets and goodwill of the previous company. The company believed it could not raise the £120,000 capital required to build the standard gauge line. Henry Dennis suggested a narrow gauge line instead, which would only require £25,000. The line would run from the canal at Chirk Bank to the Cambrian Slate Quarries. This initial line, at 6.5 miles (10.5 km) long, was opened in 1873, and was worked by horse and gravity traction carrying passengers and freight.

The 1874 timetable shows three passenger journeys each way per day, originating at "New Inn, Glyn" at 8am, reaching "Pontvaen (Chirk)" at 8.45. The return journey took an hour. The terminus at Pontfaen was on the South side of the bridge as an account of an accident in December 1874 stated that "near the Chirk terminus there is a sharp curve, almost at a right angle, to cross the River Ceriog by a wooden bridge". The tram reached this curve at too great a speed and the trucks were shot over the side throwing some of the passengers down the steep rocky bank into the river, fortunately without any fatalities.

=== Expansion ===
Glyn Valley Tramway Act 1885
- Act of Parliament
- Parliament of the United Kingdom
- Long title: An Act to confer further Powers on the Glyn Valley Tramway Company; and for other purposes.
- Citation: 48 & 49 Vict. c. cxl

Dates
- Royal assent: 31 July 1885

Text of statute as originally enacted

In 1885, additional legal powers were obtained in the Glyn Valley Tramway Act 1885 (48 & 49 Vict. c. cxl) to abandon the Quinta Tramway section between Pontfaen and Chirk Bank, replacing it with a new line from Pontfaen to the Great Western Railway's Chirk station. Under the 1885 act access to canal wharfage was obtained by extending the tramway further North from Chirk Station to the redundant Black Park Collieries Dock Basin. A two-mile extension was also authorised from Glyn to the quarries around Pandy. While the modified route was opened for mineral traffic promptly, there was a substantial delay in opening for passenger traffic arising from a dispute about the erection of a fence between the railway and the road on the new section into Chirk. The tramway eventually re-opened for passengers on Monday 16 March 1891.

The re-opened passenger service had three intermediate stations, Castle Mill, Pontfadoc and Dolywern, with no provision for stopping between stations. The journey time was 50 minutes, with 5 up trains from Chirk and 4 return trains. There was a new 12 person passenger carriage at the opening made by the Midland Carriage Co. of Shrewsbury and there was no distinction between classes of seating. Tickets were bought from the Brake van at the rear of the train, obviating the need for booking clerks and station masters. The locomotives used on this service were "Sir Theodore" and "Dennis". The 1905 timetable shows Pontfaen introduced as a request stop, and journey times reduced to 40 minutes. There were 4 trains each way with extra trains on Wednesday and Saturday.

Sir Theodore bringing a rake of 4 ton Granite wagons

=== Quarries ===
Name	Product	Start year	End year	Notes
Hendre quarry	Granite		1935	Internal railway system worked by a Lilleshall Company 0-4-0T locomotive
Upper Pandy quarry	Granite	1900	1908	
Cae-Deicws quarry	Chinastone	1885	1905	
Lower Pandy quarry	Chinastone	1885	1905	
Pen-y-Graig quarry	Silica	1911	1920	
Coed-y-Glyn mine	Granite			
Cambrian quarry	Slate	1873		Internal quarry railway was laid to 2 ft (610 mm) gauge and used a W.G. Bagnall 0-4-0ST (later replaced by a Simplex 20 HP No.2102 petrol locomotive which was preserved in the 1970s near Glyn Ceriog but its current whereabouts are unknown).
Wynne quarry	Slate	1884		
Quinta colliery	Coal			

=== Decline and closure ===
After the First World War costs started to rise significantly, while revenues did not. The railway's financial situation declined steadily during the 1920s. The railway needed to carry approximately 45,000 tons of traffic per year to break even. In 1929 it carried 64,857 tons, but by 1932 this had dropped to 21,400 tons. Increased use of road haulage and a change in the ownership of the remaining quarries was the cause of this downturn in traffic.

In 1932, a bus service was started in the valley, for the first time offering passengers a serious competition to travelling on the tramway. Passenger receipts declined steeply that year, and passenger services were abandoned at the beginning of 1933. Freight traffic continued to decline and the losses to mount on the railway and all services ceased in July 1935 as the company went into voluntary liquidation. In 1936 the track was removed and all the locomotives were scrapped.

The final train to run on the tramway was Sir Theodore and a single brake van to Chirk from Glyn Ceriog.

== Locomotives ==
At the time of the expansion, Henry Dennis was a director and also the tramway's Engineer. He was also the Engineer for the Snailbeach District Railways, near Shrewsbury. When rebuilding of the line began in 1887, Dennis offered to loan the two steam locomotives from Snailbeach, as the carriage of lead ore on that railway had plummeted. They were of the slightly narrower gauge of 2 ft 4 in (711 mm), and the difference meant that they derailed very easily. The Act of Parliament did not allow the gauge to be changed as part of the rebuilding, but in practice, it was increased to 2 ft 4 1/2 in (724 mm). Davies suggests that the two locomotives, Belmont and Fernhill, (Fernhill at Pontfaen and Belmont at Chirk) normally worked on relatively straight track, but the Glyn Valley Tramway followed the course of the road, with numerous sharp bends, where the wheel flanges may have distorted the track, opening out the gauge, and this is the most likely reason for the change of gauge.

The new line was opened for freight traffic in 1888 and to passengers in 1891. Two locomotives, Sir Theodore and Dennis were in use when passenger services resumed, and were joined by a third Beyer Peacock tram locomotive Glyn in 1892. In 1921, an ex-War Department Light Railways Baldwin Class 10-12-D was purchased; it was regauged by Beyer Peacock from its original 1 ft 11 1/2 in (597 mm) gauge. All 3 tram locomotives were modified in the 1920s to remove their condensing gear and speed regulator mechanisms.

When the line closed in 1936, buyers were found for the locomotives and rolling stock for scrapping and disposal (the unusual gauge may have been a factor for none of the stock being used on other railways), and so they were all scrapped on site or local companies.

Various components of the original locomotives still survive such as one of Glyn's original nameplates, pipework from one of the 3 trams and a singular firebar from the Baldwin. The Nameplate can be seen at the Narrow Gauge Railway Museum in Tywyn and the other components at the Museum of the New Glyn Valley Tramway and Industrial Heritage Trust.

Number	Name	Builder	Type	Works Number	Built	Notes
1	Dennis	Beyer, Peacock & Company	0-4-2T	2970	1888	Scrapped 1936
2	Sir Theodore	Beyer, Peacock & Company	0-4-2T	2969	1888	Loaned to the Snailbeach District Railways around 1905. Scrapped 1936
3	Glyn	Beyer, Peacock & Company	0-4-2T	3500	1892	Scrapped 1936
4		Baldwin	4-6-0PT	45211	1917	Acquired by the GVT in 1921; mainly worked freight trains. Scrapped 1937 at Chirk

== Passenger Stock ==
The first coach from the Horse Tramway era was the horse drawn 'Toast Rack' built by the Ashbury Railway Carriage & Wagon Company Ltd of Manchester, It resembled a horse drawn road carriage and featured side curtains to protect passengers from rain.

The first proper coaches to be bought for the tramway were a pair of closed carriages bought from Messrs Ashbury and were similar in design to coaches proposed to the Ffestiniog Railway. These lasted until 1923 when they were taken out of service.

Glyn Valley Tramway Coaches at Chirk Station in 1932

Two 3rd Class center door saloon coaches from the Midland Railway Carriage and Wagon Co of Shrewsbury were purchased with one having a top clerestory and the other having a plain roof.

A singular balcony third class open carriage (similar to an American style passenger coach) was delivered in 1891, built by the Midland Carriage and Wagon Co. This coach was much narrower in comparison to the other coaches as it had no doors, it was semi retired and used as a standby coach in the latter years.

All other coaches used on the line were built by the Midland Railway carriage and Wagon Co and shared a distinct box like appearance with panelled ends and 2 doors on each side, the coaches were either closed or open with oil lamps depending on the design. A singular first class closed coach was used which was identical to the other third class coaches except for its GVT crest centrally applied on each side instead of the 'G.V.T.' lettering on all the other coaches. In total 14 coaches (including the two Messrs coaches but not the initial 'Toast Rack') were used on the line throughout the tramway's existence.

== Goods & General Purpose Stock ==
During the GVT's lifetime a plethora of rolling stock was used on the network to transport all sorts of goods offered to the company.

- Granite Wagons: The Granite wagons were the most numerous wagons to be used on the network with 205 of them being ordered and delivered by the Midland Carriage & Wagon Co in batches between 1890 and 1895. These wagons transported the granite loads from the quarries at Glyn Ceriog down to the canals and exchange sidings at Chirk. Around 20 wagons were in private owner livery for The Ceriog Granite Co Ltd Quarry Proprietors and ran on the main tramway, These differed to the standard wagons as they were built by the Cambrian Wagon Company.
- Slate Wagons: 40 slate wagons based on the 1 ton chassis were built for the GVT during the tramway era and were used to mainly transport slate down to Chirk (at first by gravity or horse) and passengers before any coaches were delivered. Slate traffic ceased in 1935
- Bolster Wagons: 8 Bolster wagons were built for the tramway on the same 1t chassis as the slate wagons and were used to transport long timber loads, These were replaced by bigger bolsters with the same chassis as the granite wagons with Runner wagons inbetween.
- Goods Vans: 2 Covered goods vans were built for the tramway in 1893 on the same 4t granite wagon chassis and were used to transport loads such as beer to the hotels in the Ceriog Valley. One van was privately bought for preservation but was destroyed eventually.
- Brake Vans: 2 brake vans were delivered to Chirk in 1890 from the Birmingham Railway Carriage & Wagon Co and were used on both goods and passenger trains, they always faced towards Chirk and were never turned around. The brakes had coke fired stoves and lamps along with a plethora of tools to ensure reliable running. The vans doubled as ticket offices (similar to practice on the Talyllyn Railway) to save the needs of Station Masters or porters at stations. A third brake was being developed at Chirk at the time the tramway closed.

== Preservation ==
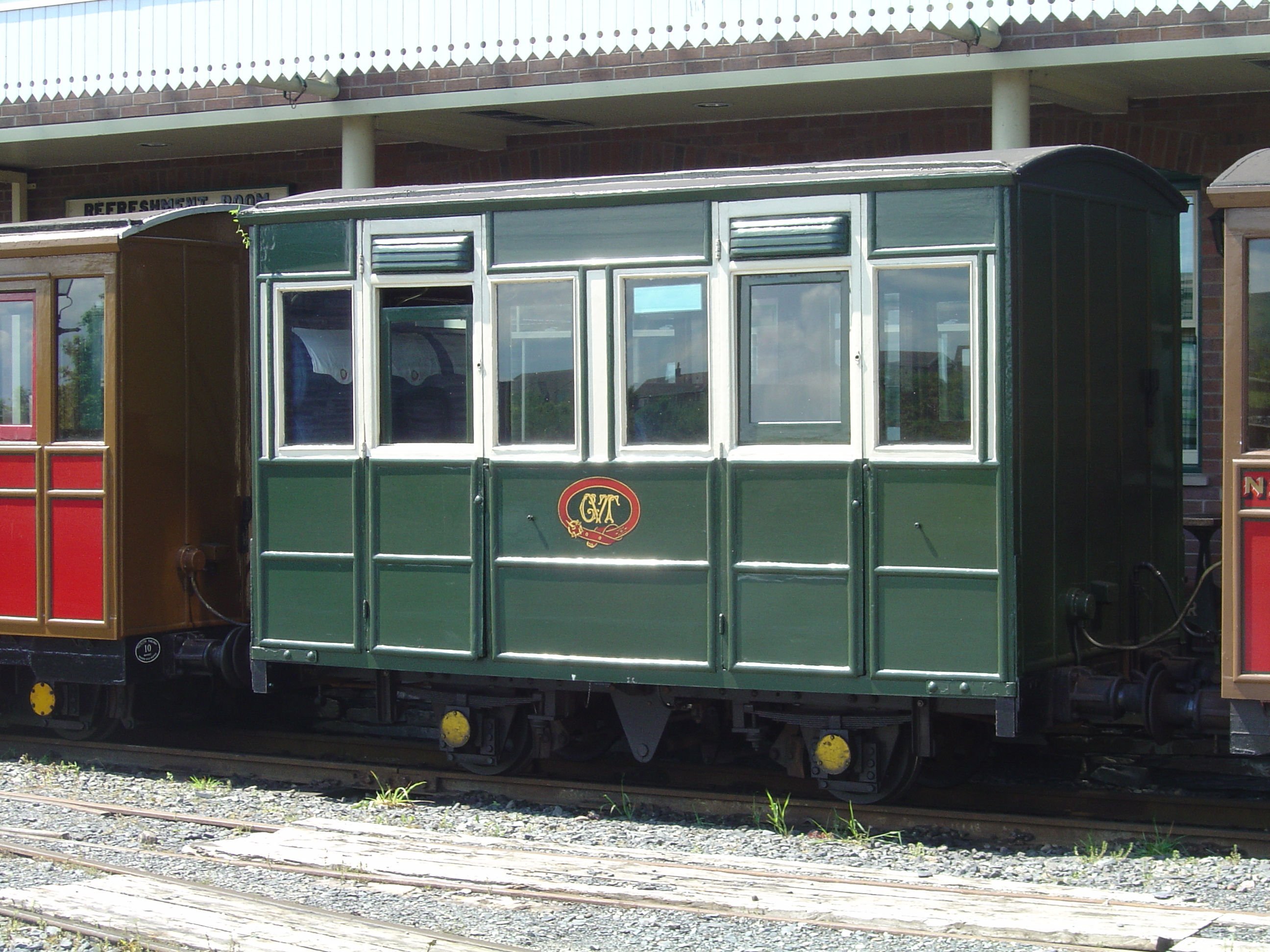
Glyn Valley carriage, now preserved on the Talyllyn Railway

Most of the railway's stock and track were removed and scrapped in the 1930s. However, some carriage bodies were sold to local farmers as animal coops or storage sheds. Two of these bodies (a Third class standard coach and the lone First class coach) survived long enough to be rescued by the Talyllyn Railway in 1957 where they were restored cosmetic and operational order. A quantity of original Glyn Valley track also found its way to the Talyllyn.

The waiting rooms in Pontfadog and Dolywern survive in their original locations. In 1950 the council officer used Pontfadog waiting room to collect rates and the locals nicknamed it ‘Pontfadog Town Hall’. It was later bought by the public house and it was also used as a craft shop.

=== Glyn Valley Tramway Trust ===
In October 2007, the Glyn Valley Tramway Trust was formed with the aim of restoring part of the tramway. They plan to recreate its appearance in the 1920s era and provide a visitor centre and workshops with educational facilities to display and interpret the history and development of the Tramway through artefacts and audio-visual media. The Glyn Valley Tramway Trust are to carry out a Design and Evaluation study of the entire route from Chirk to Glyn Ceiriog and beyond, and as a first phase intends to re-instate a 1-kilometre (0.6 mi) section as an operational steam heritage railway from the original Chirk GVT station to Baddy's Wood near Pontfaen.

In 2019, the Glyn Valley Tramway Trust started to clear trees and spoil from the station site at Chirk, adjacent to the Network Rail station. In August 2022, the platform and trackbed had been cleared. The Trust intends to rebuild the platform, and lay track in the station area.

On 31 October 2022, the trust announced that they intend to rebuild the section of the tramway between Chirk and Pontfaen to a gauge of 2 ft 3 in (686 mm)—matching the Talyllyn Railway and Corris Railway—rather than the original Glyn Valley gauge of 2 ft 4 1/2 in (724 mm). The first section of track was laid at Chirk station in December 2022.

The Trust has been donated the frames of a new build Kerr Stuart Tattoo-class 0-4-2ST locomotive, to be numbered five and called Christopher.

The Trust (21/2/26) has bought some rolling stock (including a Hunslet diesel) from a site in Somerset, all 2'6" gauge, awaiting re-gauging to 2'3".

=== New Glyn Valley Tramway & Industrial Heritage Trust ===
The New Glyn Valley Tramway & Industrial Heritage Trust, formed in 1985, has opened an Industrial Heritage Museum and Center in Glyn Ceiriog on the original site of the station entrance. The museum currently uses the original track gauge of 2ft 4 1/2 in as the site is built on the original surviving trackbed although some sections will be laid to standard 2ft gauge in order to accommodate some of the future projects of the museum such as a replica Brake van built on a RNAD standard chassis, Hudson chassis to create replica wagons and a quarry rubbish wagon.

Original tanks, boiler and smokebox of a Baldwin 10-12-D Steam Locomotive repatriated from India are currently at the museum awaiting restoration to create a static exhibit that teaches about the original locomotive that ran freight traffic on the line.

The museum currently reside in the former Locomotive shed (Grade II listed building) at Glyn Ceriog with a portion of the original platform preserved with appropriate decorations.

Ruston & Hornsby LBT, Work's No 371932 was acquired by the trust in 2020 from the Netherlands and assists in moving rolling stock around the site.

One of the original 15 tipper wagons from Hendre quarry is preserved in the Locomotive Shed (owned by Stephen Milner and the Milner Family) alongside a replica 1 ton Horse tramway era Slate wagon constructed by Mike Rowan and his colleagues in Essex.

== See also ==
- British narrow gauge railways
- Tram engine
