= British narrow-gauge railways =

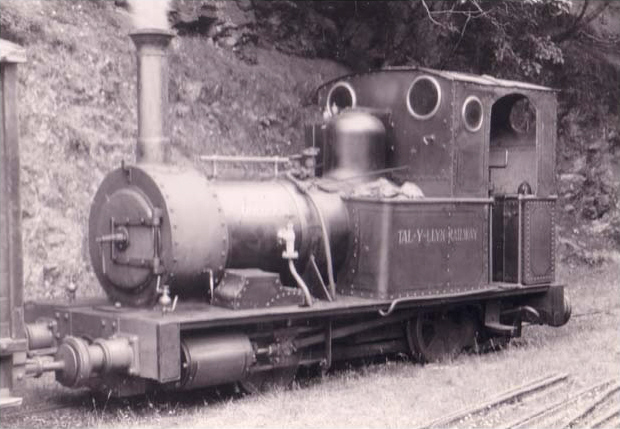
Steam locomotive Dolgoch in its first year of preservation service on the Talyllyn Railway, the first volunteer-run heritage railway in the world

There were more than a thousand British narrow-gauge railways ranging from large, historically significant common carriers to small, short-lived industrial railways. Many notable events in British railway history happened on narrow-gauge railways including the first use of steam locomotives, the first public railway and the first preserved railway.

== History ==
=== Early railways: before 1865 ===
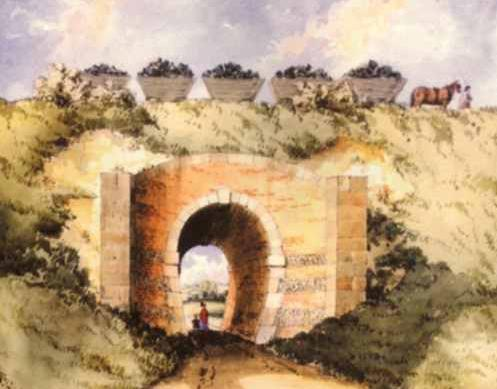
The Surrey Iron Railway, one of the earliest public railways

The earliest railways were crude wooden trackways used in coal mines to guide wooden tubs. Because of the restricted loading gauge of the tunnels and the need for loaded tubs to be light enough to be pushed by one man, these railways were almost all narrow-gauge. These underground lines often had short above-ground sections as well.

After the start of the Industrial Revolution it became possible to create railways with iron tracks and wheels, which reduced the friction involved in moving wagons, and made longer horse-hauled trains possible. These could move more material over longer distances, allowing the construction of railways from mines and quarries to transshipment points on rivers, canals and the coast. The earliest narrow-gauge railways that were more than internal mine or quarry systems were all horse-drawn industrial railways. Prominent examples include: the 3 ft 6 in (1,067 mm) gauge Little Eaton Gangway of 1793; the 3 ft 4 3/4 in (1,035 mm) gauge Lake Lock Rail Road of 1796; the 2 ft 1/2 in (622 mm) gauge Penrhyn Railroad of 1801; and the 4 ft 2 in (1,270 mm) gauge Surrey Iron Railway of 1803. The Lake Lock Rail Road is recognized as the world's first public railway.

By the start of the 19th century, steam engine technology had developed to the point where steam locomotives were being proposed. In 1804, Richard Trevithick demonstrated the first locomotive-hauled railway in the world: the 4 ft (1,219 mm) gauge Penydarren Tramway in south Wales. This first use of locomotives was a short-lived experiment, but in 1812, the 4 ft 1 in (1,245 mm) gauge Middleton Railway in Leeds became the first in the world to make commercial use of steam locomotives.

By the start of the 19th century, steam technology developed rapidly in the early 19th century, allowing smaller locomotives to haul more goods. The horse-drawn Ffestiniog Railway opened in 1836 to connect the slate quarries at Blaenau Ffestiniog with the coastal port of Porthmadog. The traffic on the line quickly grew to the point where the horses could no longer haul the empty slate wagons back to the quarries quickly enough to meet demand. In 1863, steam locomotives were introduced on the 1 ft 11 1/2 in (597 mm) gauge railway, with passenger services following in 1865. This was the first steam operated railway providing both freight and passenger services on such a small gauge and it proved the model for the introduction of narrow-gauge railways across the world.

In 1846, the British Parliament passed the Gauges Act that established 4 ft 8 1/2 in (1,435 mm) as the standard gauge for Britain. After the Gauges Act, most of the railway track laid in Great Britain was to standard gauge. However many minor railways, both public and industrial, were built to narrower gauges. These lines either followed local traditions or were built in locations where the smaller size of the railway proved more economical.

=== The boom years: 1865–1914 ===
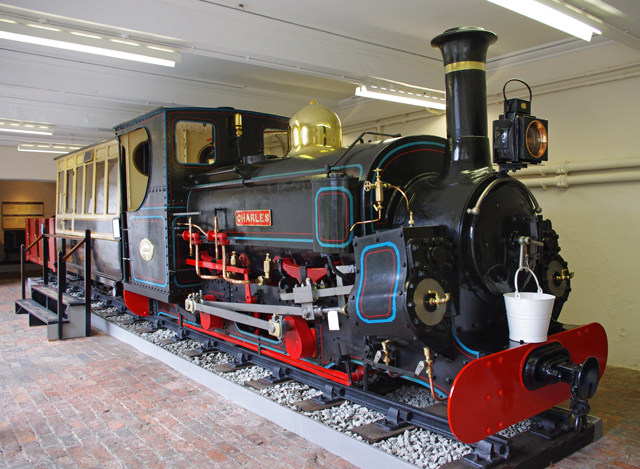
Locomotive Charles of the Penrhyn Quarry Railway, seen preserved at Penrhyn Castle Museum

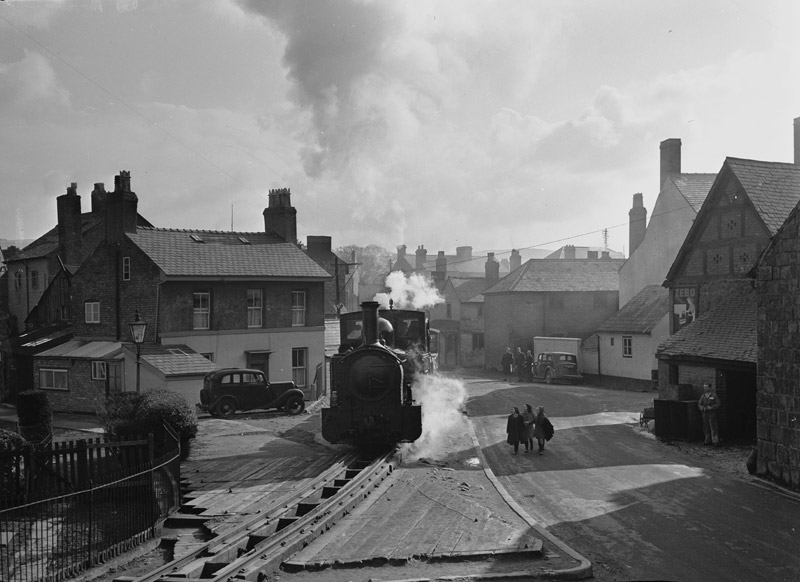
The Welshpool and Llanfair Light Railway opened in 1903. It included this section running through Welshpool town

Comparison of common British narrow track gauges (not shown is the 3 ft gauge used on the Isle of Man)

The success of the Ffestiniog Railway triggered a boom in the construction of narrow-gauge railways, not just in Britain but around the world. In the United Kingdom, the centre of narrow-gauge construction was North Wales. The mountains of the north held large quantities of slate and their narrow valleys and steep hillsides meant that the smaller narrow-gauge railways were cost effective. The major slate mining regions at Bethesda, Llanberis, Blaenau Ffestiniog and Corris all developed multiple railways to serve the quarries. Some of these lines, like the Ffestiniog Railway, the Corris Railway and the Talyllyn Railway were common carriers, while others like the Penrhyn Quarry Railway and the Padarn Railway were industrial lines.

Outside Wales, other industries started to use narrow-gauge railways to move freight, notably ironstone, limestone, china clay, brick clay and metals. Many common carrier lines were built: most of the railways on the Isle of Man were narrow-gauge – mostly 3 ft (914 mm) gauge. A number of railways were built to connect standard-gauge railways with smaller towns, including the Southwold Railway, the Wolverton and Stony Stratford Tramway and the famous Lynton and Barnstaple Railway in Devon. These lines allowed communities that did not merit a full railway service to connect to the mainline network at low cost.

The 1880s were the high point of British narrow-gauge railways as traffic on many of these lines reached its peak volume and new lines were built across the country.

In 1896, the Light Railways Act was passed which allowed the construction of railways to less stringent standards than had previously been allowed. This led to a short resurgence in the building of narrow-gauge railways, especially in rural locations. In Wales, the Welshpool and Llanfair Light Railway was built to serve farming communities and the Vale of Rheidol Light Railway was a tourist line that also served lead mines; in England the Leek and Manifold Valley Light Railway served similar purposes in the Staffordshire Moorlands.

The 1904 Railway Clearing House Railway Atlas showed the major narrow-gauge railways:

| Railway | Gauge |
|---|---|
| East Cornwall Mineral Railway | 3 ft 6 in (1,067 mm) (later converted to 4 ft 8 1/2 in (1,435 mm) standard gauge) |
| Southwold Railway | 3 ft (914 mm) |
| Pentewan Railway | 2 ft 6 in (762 mm) |
| Welshpool & Llanfair Light Railway | 2 ft 6 in (762 mm) |
| Corris Railway | 2 ft 3 in (686 mm) |
| Talyllyn Railway | 2 ft 3 in (686 mm) |
| Croesor Tramway | 2 ft (610 mm) |
| Ffestiniog Railway | 1 ft 11 1/2 in (597 mm) |
| Lynton and Barnstaple Railway | 1 ft 11 1/2 in (597 mm) |
| Vale of Rheidol Railway | 1 ft 11 1/2 in (597 mm) |
| Welsh Highland Railway | 1 ft 11 1/2 in (597 mm) |

=== Decline of the narrow gauge: 1914–1950 ===
After the First World War, rail traffic declined with the widespread adoption of motor vehicles and public narrow-gauge lines in Britain began to struggle financially. Most of these railways were built to serve marginal traffic that would not support a larger line. As road competition increased, many existing lines fell into decline and fewer new railways were built.

The 1920s saw a brief resurgence of the narrow gauge as surplus equipment from the War Department Light Railways (WDLR) became available. Several industrial railways were built using second-hand WDLR equipment, notably the Leighton Buzzard Light Railway. Other lines such as the Glyn Valley Tramway and the Snailbeach District Railways were able to replace ageing locomotives relatively cheaply and continue to operate on shoestring budgets. Even the famed Ffestiniog Railway acquired a Baldwin locomotive to shore up the fleet working the Welsh Highland Railway which it now owned.

The last narrow-gauge commercial carrier in Britain was the Ashover Light Railway, opened in 1925 using surplus war equipment. This was the epitome of cheaply constructed light railways and was one of several minor railways owned by Colonel Stephens.

Meanwhile, the use of narrow-gauge railways in industry continued to flourish. Many small railways were built to serve sand and gravel pits, cement works and the peat and timber extraction industries, often using ex-WDLR equipment.

The continued development of road transport and the economic crises of the 1930s saw a slow decline in the use of narrow-gauge railways across the country. The Second World War pushed many struggling enterprises into bankruptcy as labour and materials were diverted to the war effort. During and immediately after the war, the majority of the remaining lines closed: between 1946 and 1950 the Ffestiniog, Corris, Ashover Light, Rye and Camber and Eaton Hall railways all closed. Many industrial lines did not survive the war years.

=== The narrow gauge after 1950 ===
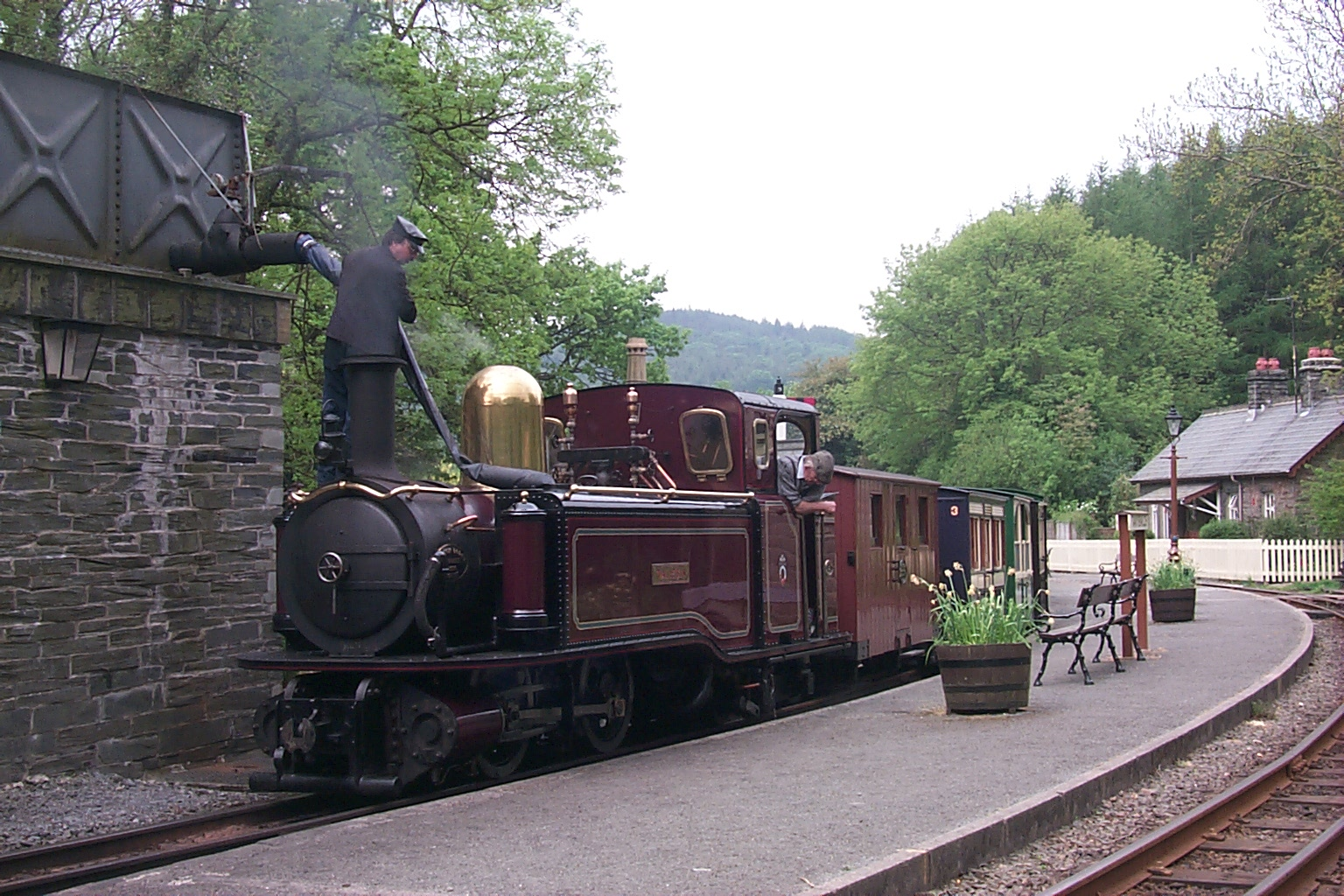
Locomotive Taliesin on the revived Ffestiniog Railway, one of the Great Little Trains of Wales

The use of narrow-gauge railways in Britain declined throughout the first half of the 20th century. This decline accelerated after the Second World War as improved road transport displaced railways in industry and for passenger service.

In 1951 however, a group of railway enthusiasts, alarmed at the loss of this part of British industrial heritage, stepped in to save the failing Talyllyn Railway. This became the first railway to be run entirely by volunteers and sparked a movement to preserve many railways, both narrow- and standard-gauge as tourist attractions. Since then many lines have been preserved as working museums, and new narrow-gauge railways are being constructed for the tourist industry.

In the 21st century a very few industrial and common carrier lines survive. Notable among the latter are the Glasgow Subway, an underground metro line that operates on a 4 ft (1,219 mm) gauge, and the Manx Electric Railway on the Isle of Man.

== Significant lines ==
Amongst the most well-known narrow-gauge lines in Britain are the Ffestiniog, the oldest independent railway company in the world, the Talyllyn, the world's first preserved railway of any gauge, and the Welshpool & Llanfair in Wales; and the Lynton & Barnstaple in England. Unique among British railways is the rack-and-pinion Snowdon Mountain Railway which climbs to just below the summit of Wales' highest peak.

Several significant lines operate on the Isle of Man. The 3 ft (914 mm) gauge Isle of Man Steam Railway operates as a tourist attraction. The 3 ft (914 mm) Manx Electric Railway has the two oldest operating electric trams in the world. The 3 ft 6 in (1,067 mm) gauge Snaefell Mountain Railway climbs the island's main peak and is the sole operating Fell system railway in the world.

== The narrow-gauge railways of Britain and the Isle of Man ==
=== Public railways ===
These are narrow-gauge railways that ran public passenger trains for a significant portion of their existence. In 1951 the Talyllyn Railway was the first railway in the world to be taken over and preserved by volunteers. This was the start of the heritage railway movement, which has flourished in Britain and around the world in the years since. As a result, many of these lines passed from being common carriers and were preserved as heritage railways after their demise. Where this has happened their heritage existence is included as a second row.

| Name | Years of operation | Gauge | Length | Location | Image | Notes |
|---|---|---|---|---|---|---|
| Abbey Light Railway | 1978–2012 | 2 ft (610 mm) | 0.75 mi (1.21 km) | Kirkstall Abbey, Leeds, England | | From opposite the shopping zone into the Abbey grounds. Industrial diesels, used to run most Sundays in summer. Dismantled in 2013 after death of owner. |
| Alford and Sutton Tramway | 1884–1889 | 2 ft 6 in (762 mm) | 7 miles (11.3 km) | Alford, England | | Steam-hauled street tramway |
| Alford Valley Railway | 1979–present | 2 ft (610 mm) | 0.84 miles (1.4 km) | Alford, Scotland | | Built on the old standard-gauge branch from Upper Donside to Kintore Junction |
| Almond Valley Light Railway | 1993–present | 2 ft 6 in (762 mm) | 0.25 miles (0.4 km) | Livingston, Scotland | | Short line at a heritage museum featuring diesel locomotives from armaments factories |
| Ashover Light Railway | 1925–1950 | 2 ft (610 mm) | 7.5 miles (12.1 km) | Clay Cross, England | | Mineral and passenger line owned by the Clay Cross Company built using ex-WDLR equipment |
| Bala Lake Railway | 1972–present | 1 ft 11 1/2 in (597 mm) | 4.5 miles (7.2 km) | Llanuwchllyn, Wales | | Steam-hauled tourist railway built on the trackbed of the standard-gauge Ruabon–Barmouth line |
| Birmingham Corporation Tramways | 1872–1953 | 3 ft 6 in (1,067 mm) | 80.5 miles (129.6 km) | Birmingham | | A large network of tramways running through Birmingham and the Black Country. Originally steam- and horse- hauled, converted to electricity from 1901. |
| Brecon Mountain Railway | 1980–present | 1 ft 11 3/4 in (603 mm) | 5 miles (8 km) | Merthyr Tydfil, Wales | | Steam-hauled tourist railway built on the trackbed of the standard-gauge Brecon & Merthyr Railway |
| Bredgar and Wormshill Light Railway | 1975–present | 2 ft (610 mm) | 0.5 miles (0.8 km) | Hollingbourne, England | | A one-half-mile (0.8 km) long private steam railway that holds regular open days |
| Camborne and Redruth Tramways | 1902–1934 | 3 ft 6 in (1,067 mm) | 3.5 miles (5.6 km) | Redruth, England | | Cornwall's only electric tramway. As well as a passenger service, mineral traffic was carried behind electric locomotives. |
| Campbeltown and Machrihanish Light Railway | 1877–1932 | 2 ft 3 in (686 mm) | 6 miles (9.7 km) | Mull of Kintyre, Scotland | | Remote line serving coal mines and passengers on the Kintyre peninsula |
| Corris Railway | 1859–1948 | 2 ft 3 in (686 mm) | 12.25 miles (19.7 km) | Machynlleth, Wales | | Built to carry slate from the Corris district. Closed after flooding of the Afon Dyfi. |
| Corris Railway | 1967–present | 2 ft 3 in (686 mm) | 1.170 miles (1.9 km) | Corris, Wales | | Heritage railway revival of the Corris Railway. Reopened in 2002. |
| Devon Railway Centre | 1997–present | 2 ft (610 mm) | Unknown | Bickleigh, England | | A tourist railway and locomotive collection |
| Eastbourne Electric Tramway | 1953-1969 | 2 ft (610 mm) | approx 800 yards | Eastbourne, Sussex | | An electric tramway upon closure moved to Seaton,Devon |
| Fairbourne Railway | 1895–1916 | 2 ft (610 mm) | 2 miles (3.2 km) | Fairbourne, Wales | | A horse-drawn tramway carrying building materials for Fairbourne village |
| Fairbourne Railway | 1916–1986 | 15 in (381 mm) | 2 miles (3.2 km) | Fairbourne, Wales | | A minimum-gauge railway replacing the horse-drawn tramway, for carrying tourists |
| Fairbourne Railway | 1986–present | 12 1/4 in (311 mm) | 2 miles (3.2 km) | Fairbourne, Wales | | Passenger carrying miniature railway running from Fairbourne village to Penrhyn Point. From 2012 onwards, some 15 in (381 mm) track has been reinstated. |
| Festiniog and Blaenau Railway | 1868–1883 | 1 ft 11 1/2 in (597 mm) | 3.5 miles (5.6 km) | Blaenau Ffestiniog, Wales | | Independent line feeding the Ffestiniog Railway to which it was connected. Converted to a standard-gauge branch of the Great Western Railway in 1883 |
| Ffestiniog Railway | 1836 −1946 | 1 ft 11 1/2 in (597 mm) | 13.5 miles (21.7 km) | Porthmadog, Wales | | Built to carry slate from the Blaenau Ffestiniog district to the coast |
| Ffestiniog Railway | 1954–present | 1 ft 11 1/2 in (597 mm) | 13.625 miles (21.9 km) | Porthmadog, Wales | | Heritage revival of the original company. Longer route due to the spiral. |
| Foxdale Railway | 1886–1940 | 3 ft (914 mm) | 2.5 miles (4.0 km) | Foxdale, Isle of Man | | Carried lead and silver ore from mines at Foxdale to St John's for onward transport to Ramsey via the Manx Northern Railway who operated the line |
| Gartell Light Railway | 1990–present | 2 ft (610 mm) | 0.75 miles (1.2 km) | Yenston, Somerset, England | | Built partly along the track of the old Somerset and Dorset Joint Railway |
| Glasgow Subway | 1896–present | 4 ft (1,219 mm) | 6.5 miles (10.5 km) | Glasgow, Scotland | | Underground cable-hauled metro line, converted to three-rail operation in 1935 and modernised 1977–1980. Still in operation as a common carrier. |
| Glyn Valley Tramway | 1873–1935 | 2 ft 4 1/2 in (724 mm) | 8.75 miles (14.1 km) | Chirk, Wales | | Carried granite and passengers along the Ceriog Valley, much of the length as a roadside tramway |
| Glyn Valley Tramway | 2007–present | 2 ft 3 in (686 mm) | 0.1 miles (0.2 km) | Chirk, Wales | | Glyn Valley Tramway Trust based at Chirk Station. Has planning permission for a one-mile running line. |
| Glyn Valley Tramway | 1989–present | 2 ft 4 1/2 in (724 mm) | 0.1 miles (0.2 km) | Chirk, Wales | | New Glyn Valley Tramway & Industrial Heritage Trust based at Glyn Ceriiog station |
| Great Laxey Mine Railway | 2004–present | 19 in (483 mm) | 0.25 miles (0.4 km) | Laxey, Isle of Man | | Replica locomotives running passenger trains on the original trackbed of the Laxey mines railway |
| Great Orme Tramway | 1902–present | 3 ft 6 in (1,067 mm) | 1.25 miles (2 km) | Llandudno, Wales | | Cable-hauled tourist railway carrying passengers to the top of the Great Orme headland |
| Groudle Glen Railway | 1896–1962 | 2 ft (610 mm) | 0.75 miles (1.2 km) | Isle of Man | | Tourist railway along the clifftops at Groudle Glen |
| Groudle Glen Railway | 1986–present | 2 ft (610 mm) | 0.75 miles (1.2 km) | Isle of Man | | Tourist railway along the clifftops at Groudle Glen Restored by the Isle of Man Steam Railway Supporters' Association |
| Hampton & Kempton Waterworks Railway | 1916–1945 | 2 ft (610 mm) | 2 miles (3.2 km) | Hampton, London | | A short line near the site of the original industrial railway serving Hampton Waterworks |
| Hampton & Kempton Waterworks Railway | 2013–present | 2 ft (610 mm) | 0.18 miles (0.3 km) | Hampton, London | | A short line near the site of the original industrial railway serving Hampton Waterworks |
| Hayling Seaside Railway | 2003–present | 2 ft (610 mm) | 1.1 miles (1.8 km) | Hayling Island | | Runs along Hayling Island sea front |
| Herne Bay Pier Railway | 1896–1939 | 3 ft 4 1/2 in (1,029 mm) | 0.75 miles (1.2 km) | Herne Bay, England | | Pier construction railway that was retained for passenger use |
| Hythe Pier Railway | 1879–present | 2 ft (610 mm) | 0.33 miles (0.53 km) | Hythe, England | | Originally hand-operated. Relaid and converted to third-rail electric operation in 1922. Forms part of an integrated rail-and-ferry transport link from Hythe to Southampton. |
| Isle of Man Steam Railway | 1873–present | 3 ft (914 mm) | 46 miles (74 km) | Douglas, Isle of Man | | An extensive network of lines covering the island. Now reduced to one main line that is principally a steam-hauled tourist railway. |
| Jersey Railway | 1870–1936 | 3 ft 6 in (1,067 mm) | 8.5 miles (13.7 km) | Saint Helier, Jersey | | Passenger and goods services in the island of Jersey |
| Lake Lock Rail Road | 1798–1846 | 3 ft 4 3/4 in (1,035 mm) | | Stanley, England | | Early narrow-gauge railway serving collieries and stone quarries near Wakefield |
| Launceston Steam Railway | 1983–present | 1 ft 11 1/2 in (597 mm) | 2.5 miles (4.0 km) | Launceston, England | | Steam-hauled tourist railway built on the trackbed of the standard-gauge North Cornwall Railway |
| Leadhills and Wanlockhead Railway | 1986–present | 2 ft (610 mm) | 0.75 miles (1.2 km) | Leadhills, Scotland | | Passenger-carrying tourist line built on a standard-gauge trackbed |
| Leek and Manifold Valley Light Railway | 1904–1934 | 2 ft 6 in (762 mm) | 8.5 miles (13.7 km) | Hulme End, England | | Agricultural and passenger service for the Manifold valley in the Staffordshire Moorlands |
| Leighton Buzzard Light Railway | 1968–present | 2 ft (610 mm) | 3 miles (4.8 km) | Leighton Buzzard, England | | Heritage railway operating over the tracks of the Leighton Buzzard Light Railway |
| Lincolnshire Coast Light Railway | 1958–1985, 2009–present | 600 mm (1 ft 11 5/8 in) | 1 mile | Humberston, England later Skegness Water Leisure Park, England | | Tourist line built using ex–Nocton Potato Estate railway equipment at Humberstone. The rolling stock and track were moved to Skegness Water Park, and the railway was reopened in 2009 on the new site. |
| Little Braxted Bakery Railway | | 2 ft (610 mm) | 0.4 miles | Witham, England | | The Little Braxted Railway at The Braxted Bakery near Witham in Essex. |
| Little Eaton Gangway | 1795–1908 | 3 ft 6 in (1,067 mm) and 4 ft (1,219 mm) | 5 miles | Little Eaton, England | | One of the earliest iron railways in the world, this narrow-gauge wagonway was built by Benjamin Outram and survived over 100 years hauling coal from Denby to the Erewash Canal. |
| Llanberis Lake Railway | 1972–present | 1 ft 11 1/2 in (597 mm) | 2.5 miles (4 km) | Llanberis, Wales | | Tourist railway running along part of the trackbed of the Padarn Railway using equipment from the Dinorwic quarry railway. |
| Lynton and Barnstaple Railway | 1898–1935 | 1 ft 11 1/2 in (597 mm) | 19.25 miles (31.0 km) | Barnstaple, England | | Carried passengers and general freight for 20 miles (32 km) of rugged countryside around Exmoor, Devon. Part of the line is now being restored as a heritage railway, and reopened to passengers in 2004. The line was extended to just over 1-mile (1.6 km) in May 2006. |
| Lynton and Barnstaple Railway | 2003–present | 1 ft 11 5/8 in (600 mm) | 1 mile (1.6 km) | Woody Bay, England | | Restoration of the Lynton and Barnstaple railway, on the trackbed of the original line |
| Manx Electric Railway | 1893 -present | 3 ft (914 mm) | 17 miles (27 km) | Douglas, Isle of Man | | An electric tramway running from Douglas to Ramsey along the east coast of the Isle of Man |
| Manx Northern Railway | 1879–1905 | 3 ft (914 mm) | 16.75 miles (27.0 km) | Ramsey, Isle of Man | | Steam railway from St John's to Ramsey on the Isle of Man. Incorporated into the Isle of Man Railway in 1905. |
| Margam Park Railway | 2002–present | 2 ft (610 mm) | 1.04 miles (1.7 km) | Margam Country Park | | Operates in Margam Country Park, not open in winter |
| Middleton Railway | 1758–1881 | 4 ft 1 in (1,245 mm) | 0.96 miles (1.5 km) | Middleton, England | | Early railway, that ran the first successful steam locomotives starting in 1812. Converted to standard gauge in 1881, it exists in 2016 as a preserved railway. |
| North Bay Railway | 1931-Present | 20 in (508 mm) | 0.9 miles (1.4 km) | Scarborough, England | | |
| North Gloucestershire Railway | 1985–present | 2 ft (610 mm) | 0.2 miles (0.32 km) | Toddington, England | | A short railway laid beside the Gloucestershire and Warwickshire Railway, replacing the Dowty Railway Society |
| North Wales Narrow Gauge Railways | 1877–1916 | 1 ft 11 1/2 in (597 mm) | 12.25 miles (19.7 km) | Dinas, Wales | | One of the precursors to the WHR. Carried passengers, slate and general freight. |
| Perrygrove Railway | 1995–present | 15 in (381 mm) | 1 1/2 miles (2.4 km) | Royal Forest of Dean, England | | A steam hauled tourist railway |
| Plynlimon and Hafan Tramway | 1897–1899 | 2 ft 3 in (686 mm) | 7 miles (11.3 km) | Talybont, Wales | | Short-lived line serving the Hafan stone quarry and Talybont village with a rail link at Llanfihangel (now Llandre) |
| Portmadoc, Beddgelert and South Snowdon Railway | 1901–1908 | 1 ft 11 1/2 in (597 mm) | Unknown | Porthmadog, Wales | | An attempt to connect Porthmadog to Beddgelert and the NWNGR. Although it never opened to traffic, much of the trackbed was built and formed part of the WHR. |
| Ravenglass and Eskdale Railway | 1875–1913 | 3 ft (914 mm) | 6.75 miles (10.9 km) | Ravenglass, England | | A line serving the iron ore mines and local passengers in the western Lake District. Closed to passengers in 1908, but freight continued until 1913. |
| Ravenglass and Eskdale Railway | 1915–present | 15 in (381 mm) | 6.75 miles (10.9 km) | Ravenglass, England | | A 15 in (381 mm) minimum-gauge railway which is still in operation, with a mixture of steam and diesel locomotives |
| Romney, Hythe and Dymchurch Railway | 1927–present | 15 in (381 mm) | 13.75 miles (22.1 km) | Kent, England | | Running a mixture of steam and diesel trains, mainly operates as a tourist attraction but has also provided local services including secondary school transport, shoppers trains, and freight services including fish and commercial ballast transportation |
| Rothesay and Ettrick Bay Light Railway | 1879–1936 | 4 ft (1,219 mm), converted to 3 ft 6 in (1,067 mm) in 1902 | 4.75 miles (7.6 km) | Rothesay, Scotland | | A horse tramway, converted to an electric tramway in 1902 |
| Rye and Camber Tramway | 1895–1946 | 3 ft (914 mm) | 2.5 miles (4.0 km) | Rye, England | | Passenger railway serving the seaside resorts and golf courses around Rye |
| Seaton Tramway | 1969–present | 2 ft 9 in (838 mm) | 3 miles (4.8 km) | Seaton, Devon, England | | Operates over a former axed British Rail branch line |
| Shipley Glen Tramway | 1895–present | 20 in (508 mm) | 0.2 miles (0.3 km) | Saltaire, England | | Rope-hauled inclined tourist railway |
| Sittingbourne & Kemsley Light Railway | 1969–present | 2 ft 6 in (762 mm) | 3.5 miles (5.6 km) | Sittingbourne, England | | Heritage railway founded by the Locomotive Club of Great Britain, operating over part of the Bowater Light Railway |
| Snaefell Mountain Railway | 1895–present | 3 ft 6 in (1,067 mm) | 5 miles (8 km) | Laxey, Isle of Man | | Steeply-graded electric-powered Fell railway climbing to the summit of Snaefell, the Isle of Man's highest peak |
| Snowdon Mountain Railway | 1896–present | 800 mm (2 ft 7 1/2 in) | 5 miles (8 km) | Llanberis, Wales | | Britain's only rack railway, built to carry passengers to the top of Wales' highest mountain |
| Steep Grade Railway | 1897–1909 | 3 ft (914 mm) | Unknown | Brighton, England | | A tourist funicular railway climbing the South Downs |
| South Tynedale Railway | 1983–present | 2 ft (610 mm) | 5 miles (8.0 km) | Alston, England | | Steam-hauled line running on part of the trackbed of the standard-gauge Newcastle and Carlisle Railway's Haltwhistle to Alston Branch |
| Southend Pier Railway | 1830–1978 | 3 ft 6 in (1,067 mm) | 1.34 miles (2.2 km) | Southend, England | | Pier construction railway later used for passenger haulage, firstly horse-drawn, then electric |
| Southend Pier Railway | 1986–present | 3 ft (914 mm) | 1.34 miles (2.2 km) | Southend, England | | Pier railway later using modern battery electric stock |
| Southport Pier Tramway | 1863–2015 | 3 ft 6 in (1,067 mm) (1 ft 11 1/2 in / 597 mm between 1950 and 2002) | 0.68 miles (1.1 km) | Southport, England | | Pier tramway, originally built for baggage and later used for passenger haulage. Variously operated by cable, (external) electric, diesel and (currently) battery–electric traction. |
| Southwold Railway | 1879–1929 | 3 ft (914 mm) | 8.75 miles (14.1 km) | Southwold, England | | Steam-hauled line connecting Southwold with Halesworth along the Suffolk coast. There are ongoing plans to relay part of the line. |
| Steeple Grange Light Railway | 1988–present | 18 in (457 mm) | 0.5 miles (0.8 km) | Wirksworth, England | | Passenger-hauling minimum-gauge railway running on the trackbed of the Killer's Branch of the standard-gauge Cromford and High Peak Railway |
| Surrey Iron Railway | 1802–1846 | 4 ft 2 in (1,270 mm) | 9 miles (14.5 km) | Coulsdon, England | | A horse-drawn plateway that linked Wandsworth and Croydon via Mitcham, the Surrey Iron Railway was the first public railway in the world, being established by Act of Parliament in 1801. |
| Talyllyn Railway | 1865–present | 2 ft 3 in (686 mm) | 7.25 miles (11.7 km) | Tywyn, Wales | | Built to carry slate from Bryneglwys quarry to the coast. First heritage railway in the world to be preserved and run by volunteers. |
| Teifi Valley Railway | 1986–present | 2 ft (610 mm) | 1.20 miles (1.9 km) | Henllan, Wales | | A steam-hauled tourist railway on the trackbed of a standard-gauge GWR branch to Carmarthen |
| Torrington and Marland Railway | 1880–1971 | 3 ft (914 mm) | 6.25 miles (10.1 km) | Torrington, England | | Built to carry clay from the pits at Marland. |
| Tunnel Railway | 1936–1965 | 2 ft (610 mm) | 0.82 miles (1.3 km) | Ramsgate, England | | Steeply graded tourist line running mainly in a tunnel under Ramsgate |
| Twyford Waterworks | Unknown-present | 2 ft (610 mm) | Unknown | Twyford, England | | Short industrial narrow-gauge railway line |
| Vale of Rheidol Railway | 1902–present | 1 ft 11 3/4 in (603 mm) | 11.75 miles (18.9 km) | Aberystwyth, Wales | | Originally built to serve the lead mines of the Vale of Rheidol and the tourist trade, now a purely heritage line Between 1948 and 1989 the line was operated by British Rail |
| Volks Electric Railway | 1883–present | 2 ft 8.5 in (826 mm) | 1.25 miles (2 km) | Brighton, England | | Britain's first electric railway, running along the beachfront at Brighton |
| Welsh Highland Railway | 1922–1937 | 1 ft 11 1/2 in (597 mm) | 22 miles (35 km) | Porthmadog, Wales | | An ambitious but short-lived project to create Britain's longest narrow-gauge railway. Now rebuilt. |
| Welsh Highland Railway | 1997–present | 1 ft 11 1/2 in (597 mm) | 25 miles (40.2 km) | Caernarfon, Wales | | Restoration of the main line of the Welsh Highland Railway |
| Welsh Highland Heritage Railway | 1964–present | 1 ft 11 5/8 in (600 mm) | 0.75 miles (1.2 km) | Porthmadog, Wales | | Concentrating on the heritage aspects of the Welsh Highland Railway, including a museum and miniature railway. Uses a section of the original trackbed that the WHR Caernarfon line deviated from to connect to Porthmadog station on the Ffestiniog Railway. |
| Welshpool and Llanfair Light Railway | 1903–1956 | 2 ft 6 in (762 mm) | 9 miles (14.5 km) | Welshpool, Wales | | Agricultural and passenger services in the Welsh borders |
| Welshpool and Llanfair Light Railway | 1963–present | 2 ft 6 in (762 mm) | 8 miles (12.9 km) | Welshpool, Wales | | Heritage revival of the line |
| West Lancashire Light Railway | 1966–present | 2 ft (610 mm) | 0.43 miles (0.69 km) | Hesketh Bank, England | | Developed as a private railway, now operating as a tourist line with ex-industrial steam and diesel locomotives |
| Whistlestop Valley (Formerly Kirklees Light Railway) | 1991–present | 15 in (381 mm) | 3.5 miles (5.6 km) | Kirklees, West Yorkshire | | Built atop the trackbed of the Lancashire & Yorkshire Railway's former branch line, from Clayton West via Skelmanthorpe to Shelley Woodhouse |
| Wolverton and Stony Stratford Tramway | 1886–1926 | 3 ft 6 in (1,067 mm) | 4.5 miles (7.2 km) | Milton Keynes, England | | Steam-hauled roadside tramway |
| Woodhorn Narrow Gauge Railway | 1993–present | 2 ft (610 mm) | 0.62 miles (1.0 km) | Ashington, England | | Passenger-carrying narrow-gauge tourist railway |
| Yaxham Light Railway | 1967–present | 2 ft (610 mm) | 360 yards (329 m) | Yaxham, England | | Steam-hauled passenger line at the former GER railway station at Yaxham |

=== Estate railways ===
Narrow-gauge railways serving private estates. These were often minimum-gauge railways.

| Name | Years of operation | Gauge | Length | Location | Image | Notes |
|---|---|---|---|---|---|---|
| Ardkinglas Railway | before 1879-early 20th century | 2 ft (610 mm) | Unknown | Ardkinglas Estate, Scotland | | Private estate railway |
| Buscot Park Railway | c1871-c1900 | 2 ft 8 in (813 mm) | 6.0 miles (10 km) | Buscot Park, England | | Short lived industrial estate railway serving the farmland and distillery on the banks of the River Thames. |
| Dalmunzie Railway | 1920–1978 | 2 ft 6 in (762 mm) | 2.5 miles (4 km) | Dalmunzie Hotel, Scotland | | Estate railway serving the grouse shooting moors and stone quarry above the hotel |
| Dodington House Railway | ?–1983 | 2 ft (610 mm) | ? | Tormarton, England | | Built as a private line, with the intention to become a tourist attraction. Used two Hudson Hunslet diesel locomotives. Stock went to the Groudle Glen Railway after closure. |
| Duchal Moor Railway | 1922–1970s | 2 ft (610 mm) | 7 miles (11.3 km) | Duchal Moor, Scotland | | Estate railway serving the grouse shooting moors |
| Duffield Bank Railway | 1874–1916 | 15 in (381 mm) | Unknown | Duffield, Derbyshire | | Private demonstration estate railway built by Sir Arthur Heywood |
| Eaton Hall Railway | 1896–1947 | 15 in (381 mm) | 3.75 miles (6 km) | Eaton Hall, Cheshire | | Estate railway connecting Eaton Hall to the GWR at Balderton partially reconstructed as the Eaton Park Railway |
| St Michael's Mount Tramway | 1912–present | 1,372 mm (4 ft 6 in) | 200 m (656 ft) | St. Michael's Mount, Marazion, Cornwall | | Funicular used only for freight, linking quay with castle, running mainly in tunnel |
| Sand Hutton Light Railway | 1912–1932 | 18 in (457 mm) | 7 miles (11.3 km) | Warthill, England | | Passenger and general freight line serving the Sand Hutton estate. |

=== Museums ===
Museums devoted to narrow-gauge railways

| Name | Opened | Closed | Gauge | Length | Location | Image | Notes |
|---|---|---|---|---|---|---|---|
| Albany Steam Museum Forest Road Light Railway | before 1973 | unknown | 2 ft (610 mm) | Unknown | Newport, England | | Steam and diesel locomotives on the site of a planned railway. Closed due to lack of planning permission for the site. |
| Amberley Working Museum | 1979 | Present | mainly 2 ft (610 mm) | 800 yards (732 m) | Amberley, England | | Large industrial museum with extensive narrow-gauge railway collection, mainly from lines in the southeast of England. |
| Armley Mills Industrial Museum | ? | Present | various | 60 yards (55 m) | Leeds, England | | Industrial museum highlighting the industrial heritage of Leeds. Has a significant collection of Leeds-built locomotives and a short demonstration line. |
| Blists Hill Clay Mine Railway | 2009 | present | 2 ft (610 mm) | 235 yards (215 m) | Telford, Shropshire | | Operates at Blists Hill Victorian Town |
| Brockham Museum | 1962 | 1983 | various | ? | Dorking, England | | Large collection of narrow-gauge railway equipment from the south-east of England. The collection moved to the Amberley Chalk Pits Museum |
| Bursledon Brickworks Museum | About 1964 | November 2019 | 2 ft (610 mm) | ? | Bursledon, England | | Steam-railway run by the Hampshire Narrow Gauge Railway Society |
| China Clay Industry Museum | ? | Present | 4 ft 6 in (1,372 mm) | ? | St Austell, England | | Static display of ex-Lee Moor tramway locomotive |
| Conwy Valley Railway Museum | 1965 (?) | Present | Various | ? | Betws-y-Coed, Wales | | Small railway museum including a number of narrow-gauge artifacts |
| Dowty Railway Preservation Society | 1962 | 1985 | various | ? | Tewkesbury, England | | Society of railway enthusiasts from the Dowty Group of companies with a substantial collection of narrow-gauge locomotives. See the North Gloucestershire Railway entry. |
| Durley Light Railway | 1968 | 2015 | 2 ft (610 mm) | ? | Durley, England | | Collection of steam and diesel locomotives originally located at Stoke Park sand pit from 1962, moved to Durley in 1968 where a railway was established. |
| The Narrow Gauge Railway Centre at Gloddfa Ganol | 1978 | 1997 | 2 ft (610 mm) | 1/2 mile (0.80 km) | Blaenau Ffestiniog, Wales | | Then the largest collection of narrow-gauge locomotives in Britain, with over 70 present; housed in the former Oakeley slate quarry. |
| Golden Valley Light Railway | Late 1980s | Present | 2 ft (610 mm) | Just under 1-mile (1.6 km) | Butterley, England | | Scenic passenger line laid on the old Butterley works tramway, running to Newlands Inn through the country park. Large collection of working narrow-gauge locomotives and rolling stock housed within a large purpose-built shed at the Midland Railway – Butterley. |
| Herefordshire Waterworks Museum | 1982 | Present | 2 ft (610 mm) | ? | Hereford, England | | Short demonstration line. |
| Hollycombe Steam Collection | 1968 | Present | 2 ft (610 mm) | ? | Liphook, England | | Working steam museum |
| Irchester Narrow Gauge Railway Museum | 1980s | Present | 1,000 mm (3 ft 3 3/8 in) | ? | Irchester, England | | Collection of rolling stock from Midlands ironstone railways and a short demonstration line. |
| Kew Bridge Steam Museum | 1986 | Present | 2 ft (610 mm) | 400 yards (366 m) | London, England | | Waterworks museum with a short demonstration line, run since 1992 by the Hampshire Narrow Gauge Railway Society |
| Klondyke Steam Museum | 1981 | 1982 | 1 ft 11 1/2 in (597 mm) | ? | Draycott-on-the-clay, England | | A proposed steam museum using the Ffestiniog Railway locomotive Palmerston. Never opened |
| Llechwedd Slate Caverns | 1972 | present | Various | Unknown | Blaenau Ffestiniog, Wales | | Passenger carrying railway operated with battery-electric locomotives, mainly underground in the Llechwedd slate mine; separate funicular that takes passengers into deeper portions of the mine also present |
| Monkton Farleigh Mine Museum | before 1987 | 1990 | 2 ft (610 mm) | ? | Bath, England | | 4wDM locomotive at a mining museum in an abandoned quarry. |
| Morwellham Open Air Museum | ? | Present | 2 ft (610 mm) | ? | Tavistock, England | | Passenger-carrying tourist railway at the museum |
| Moseley Industrial Narrow Gauge Tramway and Museum Tumblydown Farm railway | 2001 | Present | 2 ft (610 mm) | 600 yards (549 m) | Tolgus Mount, England | | Part of the original Moseley Tramway collection now relocated to Cornwall. |
| Moseley Railway Trust | 1968 | Present | mainly 2 ft (610 mm) | 500 m | Newcastle-under-Lyme, England | | A large collection of industrial locomotives. Most of them moved to the Apedale Heritage Centre in 2006. |
| Narrow Gauge Railway Museum | 1956 | Present | Various | ? | Tywyn, Wales | | Static exhibits at the Talyllyn Railway's Tywyn Wharf station. |
| Penrhyn Castle Railway Museum | 1951 | Present | various | ? | Bangor, Wales | | Collection of industrial narrow-gauge locomotives and artifacts |
| Purbeck Mineral and Mining Museum | 2004 | Present | various | ? | Norden, England | | Collection of narrow-gauge rolling stock from the Purbeck clay mining industry. A demonstration railway is under construction. |
| Radstock Light Railway | 1995 | present | 2 ft (610 mm) | Unknown | Radstock, England | | Equipment on the Somerset and Avon Railway Association's site, mostly from the former Vobster Railway. |
| Science and Industry Museum | 1983 | Present | 3 ft (914 mm) | ? | Manchester, England | | Static exhibit of ex-Isle of Man Railway No. 3 Pender |
| Tolgus Tin Mine Museum | ? | ? | 2 ft 2 in (660 mm) | ? | Redruth, England | | Static display of mining locomotive |
| Welland Valley Vintage Traction Club | ? | ? | 3 ft (914 mm) | ? | Market Harborough, England | | Ex-ironstone quarry railway equipment on static exhibition, including Kettering Ironstone Railway No. 8 |
| Westonzoyland Pumping Station Museum | ? | 2004 | 2 ft (610 mm) | ? | Westonzoyland, England | | Small industrial museum at restored pumphouse with a short demonstration railway. |

=== Visitor attractions ===
Narrow-gauge railways that operate as part of a larger tourist attraction, such as an estate or theme park.

| Name | Years of operation | Gauge | Length | Location | Image | Notes |
|---|---|---|---|---|---|---|
| Alton Towers Park Railway | 1953–1996 | 2 ft (610 mm) | Unknown | Farley, Staffordshire, England | | A narrow-gauge railway at the Alton Towers amusement park. |
| Lappa Valley Steam Railway | 1974–present | 15 in (381 mm); 10 1/4 in (260 mm); 7 1/4 in (184 mm) | 1 mi (1.6 km) | Newquay, Cornwall, England | | A narrow-gauge railway and family entertainment park built on the trackbed of the GWR Newquay to Chacewater line, between Benny Halt and East Wheal Rose. |
| Amerton Railway | 1990–present | 2 ft (610 mm) | 0.5 mi (0.8 km) | Amerton, England | | A steam-hauled passenger line running round the Amerton Working Farm. |
| Battersea Park, Far Tottering and Oyster Creek Railway | 1951–1953 | 15 in (381 mm) | 0.5 mi (0.8 km) | Battersea, England | | A whimsical attraction at the Festival of Britain Pleasure Gardens built to the designs of the Punch cartoonist Emett. |
| Bicton Woodland Railway | 1963–present | 18 in (457 mm) | 0.772 miles (1.2 km) | Budleigh Salterton, England | | A tourist railway running round Bicton Gardens, originally equipped with stock from the Woolwich Arsenal Railway. |
| Blenheim Palace Railway | 1975-present | 15 in (381 mm) | 0.56 miles (0.9 km) | Blenheim Palace, Oxfordshire | | The line runs between car park and palace, through parkland surrounding the ancestral home of the Dukes of Marlborough. The steam-outline diesel locomotive, built by Alan Keef, is named after Winston Churchill, who was born at Blenheim in 1874. |
| Bressingham Steam and Gardens (Bressingham Steam Museum) | 1970s-present | 2 ft (610 mm) | 2.5 mi (4 km) | Diss, Norfolk | | Short passenger carrying line around the famous Bloom gardens at Bressingham; part of a larger steam collection. |
| Camelot Theme Park | 1983–1986 | 2 ft (610 mm) | Unknown | Charnock Richard, England | | Short tourist line at an amusement park in Lancashire |
| Chessington World of Adventures, Chessington Railroad | 1987–1996 | 2 ft (610 mm) | Unknown | Chessington, England | | Passenger carrying tourist line in Chessington World of Adventures that was built to replace the 12 in (305 mm) miniature railway Chessington Zoo Railway. |
| Cotswold Wildlife Park Railway | 1975–present | 2 ft (610 mm) | Unknown | Burford, England | | Passenger carrying tourist line around the wildlife park. |
| Doddington Park Light Railway | ?-present | 2 ft (610 mm) | Unknown | Chipping Sodbury, England | | A tourist railway in the grounds of Doddington House stately home. |
| Drusillas Park Railway | 1946–present | 2 ft (610 mm) | Unknown | Alfriston, England | | Short tourist line around an amusement park. |
| Gardner's Pleasure Resort | 1893–1934 | Unknown | Unknown | Riddlesdown, England | | Early pleasure railway with home-built steam locomotive which survived until 1948. |
| Gunpowder Railway at Waltham Abbey Royal Gunpowder Mills | 2022–present | 2 ft 6 in (762 mm) | 300 yards | Waltham Abbey, Hertfordshire, England | | 1,100 yards (1,000 m) long railway along the perimeter of the site with two stations one on the Long Walk the other by building 83 the current terminus of the railway. There are passing loops at both ends with plans in place to extend the running line in either direction over the coming years. |
| Knebworth Park and Winter Green Railway | 1972–1990 | 2 ft (610 mm) | 1.5 mi (2.4 km) | Knebworth, England | | Steam-hauled passenger line in the grounds of Knebworth House. |
| Legoland Windsor, Hill Train | 1991–present | 3 ft 6 in (1,067 mm) | 300 m (0.2 mi) | Windsor, Berkshire, England | | A funicular. Opened when the park was still known as Windsor Safari Park. |
| Margam Train | ?-present | 2 ft (610 mm) | Unknown | Margam Country Park, Wales | | Tourist railway round the Country Park hauled by a steam-outline diesel locomotive. |
| Old Kiln Light Railway | 1982–present | 2 ft (610 mm) | 0.5 miles (0.80 km) | Tilford, England | | Short steam-hauled railway at the Rural Life Centre. |
| Overstone Solarium Light Railway | 1969–? | 2 ft (610 mm) | Unknown | Sywell, England | | A short line running as a tourist attraction round the Overstone Solarium amusement park. |
| Pleasure Beach Express | 1933–present | 21 in (533 mm) | Unknown | Blackpool, England | | Short tourist line running around the perimeter of the south half of Pleasure Beach Blackpool. |
| RANG (Royal Arsenal Narrow Gauge) railway | 2019–present | 2 ft (610 mm) | 350 yd (320 m) | Crossness Pumping Station, Thamesmead, England | | The line transports visitors to the Victorian Pumping Station. The locomotive Bazalgette is a Severn-Lamb 0-4-0DH. |
| Seaton Tramway | 1971–present | 2 ft 9 in (838 mm) | 3 mi (4.8 km) | Seaton, England | | Electric tramway using half-scale trams. |
| Telford Town Tramway | 1979–1988, then 1992–present | 2 ft (610 mm) | 300 yards | Telford, England | | A steam-hauled tramway in Telford new town, it closed in the mid 1980s and was then moved to the Telford Steam Railway, where it continues to run. |
| Thorpe Park, Canada Creek Railway | 1989–2011 | 2 ft (610 mm) | Unknown | Chertsey, England | | Short tourist line at an amusement park in Surrey. From 1989 to 2006 this train carried guests to and from Thorpe Farm. The railway then had a shortened closed circuit around the Canada Creek area of the park beginning in 2007 until its closure. |
| Thorpe Park, Treasure Island Railway | 1984–1992 | 2 ft (610 mm) | Unknown | Chertsey, England | | Short tourist line at an amusement park in Surrey. A small train based attraction around an Island featuring live actors and audience participation loosely based on the novel Treasure Island by Robert Louis Stevenson. |
| Wey Valley Light Railway | before 1971–1982 | 2 ft (610 mm) | Unknown | Farnham, England | | Passenger-carrying railway run by Farnham District Scouts. Became the Old Kiln Light Railway |
| Whipsnade Zoo Great Whipsnade Railway | 1970–present | 2 ft 6 in (762 mm) | 2 miles (3.2 km) | Dunstable, England | | Steam-hauled passenger line running around the grounds of Whipsnade Zoo. Rolling stock came from the Bowater Light Railway. |
| Wicksteed Park Railway | 1931–present | 2 ft (610 mm) | 1.25 mile (2.0 km) | Kettering, England | | A railway line that runs in a loop around Wicksteed Park, one of the attractions for visitors at the park, and has been operating since 1931. |
| Woburn Safari Park Great Woburn Railway | 1973–present | 2 ft (610 mm). Later converted to 20 in (508 mm) | 1/4 mile (0.40 km) | Woburn, England | | Passenger line running around the grounds of Woburn Safari Park. |
| Yafford Mill Railway | 1994–2000 | 2 ft 6 in (762 mm) | 0.75 mi (1.2 km) | Newport, England | | Short-lived passenger railway using ex-MOD diesel locomotives and stock built by Alan Keef. |

=== Private railways ===
These are private lines or collections owned by individuals or small groups and generally not open to the public.

=== Industrial railways ===
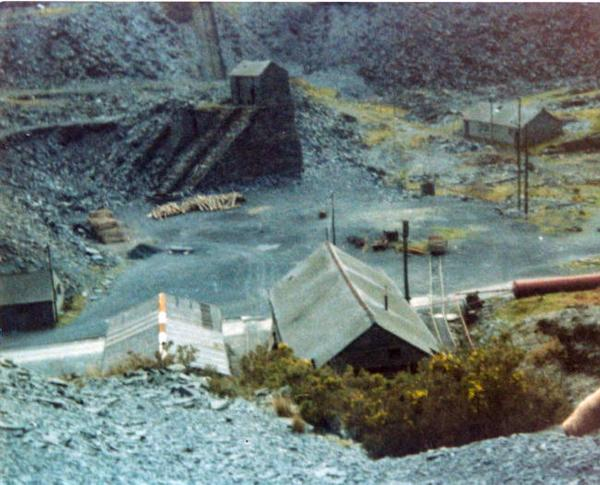
Aberllefenni slate quarry

Great Britain was home to many industrial narrow-gauge railways, ranging from temporary hand-powered lines a few yards long to significant locomotive-worked complexes of lines that served substantial industrial concerns.

=== Military railways ===
Many British military establishments and former UK Government-owned explosives sites used narrow-gauge railways. These locations were often subject to the Official Secrets Act and other government restrictions, so many of them are less well documented.

== See also ==
- British quarrying and mining narrow-gauge railways
- British narrow-gauge slate railways
- Decauville
- Industrial railways
- List of British heritage and private railways
- North Wales Narrow Gauge Railways

== Bibliography ==
- "Extensive list of 2 ft gauge railways worldwide".
- "Narrow Gauge Railway Museum's list of railways".
- "List of British narrow gauge steam locomotives". Archived from the original on 21 October 2008.
- Thomas, Cliff (2002). The Narrow Gauge in Britain & Ireland. Atlantic Publishers. ISBN 978-1-902827-05-6.
