= War Department Light Railways =

Narrow gauge trench railways run by the British War Department in WW1

The War Department Light Railways were a system of narrow gauge trench railways run by the British War Department in World War I. Light railways made an important contribution to the Allied war effort in the First World War, and were used for the supply of ammunition and stores, the transport of troops and the evacuation of the wounded.

== Track gauges ==
Different track gauges were used in different parts of the world including 600mm, 760 mm (2 ft 5 15/16 in), 1,000 mm (3 ft 3 3/8 in) metre gauge and 1,050 mm (3 ft 5 11/32 in).

The military light railways in France were of 600 mm (1 ft 11 5/8 in) gauge and used a variety of steam and petrol locomotives from French, British and American builders. The Germans installed their 600 mm (1 ft 11 5/8 in) gauge Feldbahn system early in the war. Trench railways of the World War I western front produced the greatest concentration of minimum-gauge railway locomotives observed to date.

== Development ==
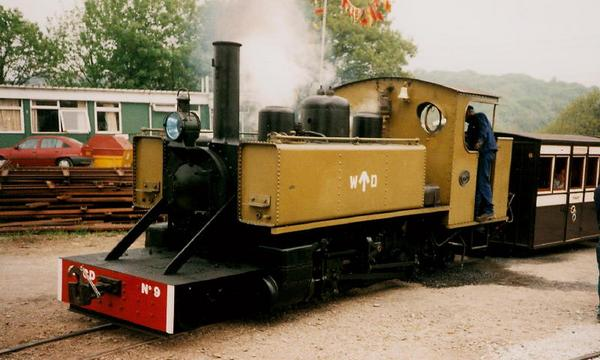
ALCO locomotive built for the WDLR, seen running on the Ffestiniog Railway in 1995

Britain came to the belated realisation that it needed a flexible and reliable method of supplying the front lines, bringing shells, timber, and fodder from the rear areas and their standard gauge supply points. Narrow gauge light railways were the solution.

Hundreds of locomotives were built by companies such as Hunslet, Kerr Stuart, ALCO, Davenport, Motor Rail and Baldwin to work these lines. Also, Model T Ford conversions were used. Thirty or so Companies were formed within the Royal Engineers to staff the lines. These were mostly British ex-railwaymen pressed into service, though Australian, South African and Canadian gangs served with distinction. An American unit also served under the British flag.

Each area of the front would have its own light rail to bring up materiel. The British perfected roll on roll off train ferries to bring fodder and supplies direct from England via train ferries to France. Northern French rail lines were under direct military control of the Army in the area.

By 1917, the Canadians led the way in showing the utility of light railways. Having built thousands of miles of new frontier track in Western Canada in the previous decades, these "colonials", led by J. Stewart, supplied the Canadian Corps who went on to victory at Vimy. From this the light railways were expanded to 700 miles (1,100 km) of track, which supplied 7,000 tons of supplies daily. The ebb and flow of war meant that rail lines were built and rebuilt, moved and used elsewhere, but by the latter years of Passchendaele, Amiens and Argonne, light railways came into their own and pulled for the final victory.

== WDLR locomotives ==
A large number of locomotives (mostly of 600 mm (1 ft 11 5/8 in) gauge) was ordered for the WDLR. These included:

=== Steam ===
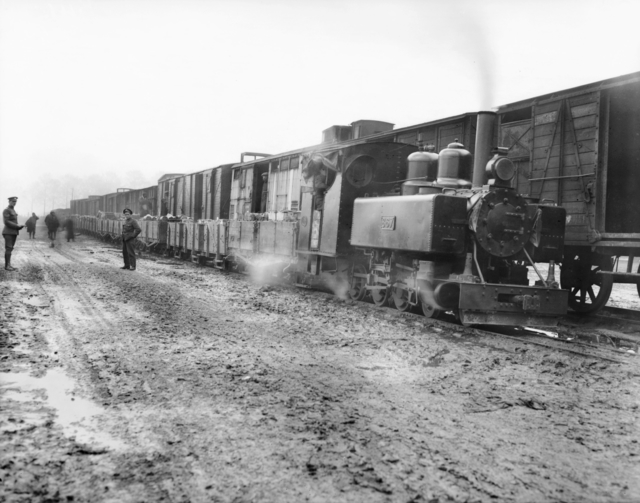
Western Front (Belgium), Ypres Area. Locomotive believed to be a Baldwin 4-6-0T

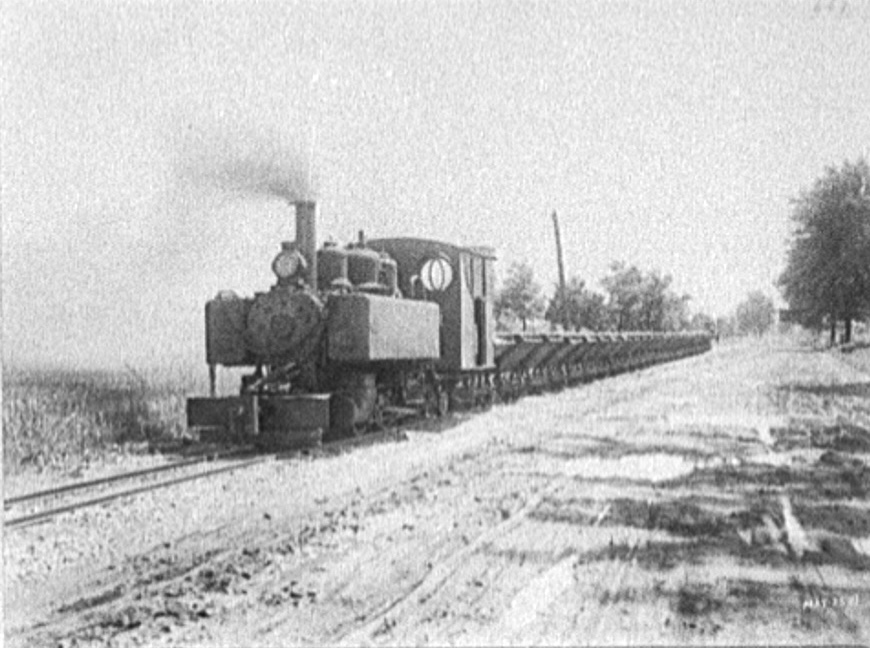
Baldwin Class 10-12-D in Michigan in 1921 after the end of the war

- Hudson 0-6-0WT (built by Hudswell Clarke)
- Barclay 0-6-0WT
- Hunslet 4-6-0T
- Baldwin Class 10-12-D 4-6-0T
- ALCO 2-6-2T

Dimensions

Dimension	Hudson	Barclay	Hunslet	Baldwin	Alco
Wheel arrangement	0-6-0WT	0-6-0WT	4-6-0T	4-6-0T	2-6-2T
Driving wheels	1 ft 11 in (584 mm)	1 ft 10 in (559 mm)	2 ft 0 in (610 mm)	1 ft 11.5 in (597 mm)	2 ft 3 in (686 mm)
Tank capacity Imperial gallons L US gallons	110 imp gal (500 L; 130 US gal)	110 imp gal (500 L; 130 US gal)	375 imp gal (1,700 L; 450 US gal)	(476 US gal or 1,800 L or 396 imp gal)	396 imp gal (1,800 L; 476 US gal)
Fuel capacity	3.5 long hundredweight (180 kg; 390 lb)	3.5 long hundredweight (180 kg; 390 lb)	15 long hundredweight (760 kg; 1,700 lb)	15 long hundredweight (760 kg; 1,700 lb)	15 long hundredweight (760 kg; 1,700 lb)
Cylinders	6.5 in × 12 in (165 mm × 305 mm)	6.75 in × 10.75 in (171 mm × 273 mm)	9.5 in × 12 in (241 mm × 305 mm)	9 in × 12 in (229 mm × 305 mm)	9 in × 14 in (229 mm × 356 mm)
Working pressure	180 psi (1,200 kPa)	160 psi (1,100 kPa)	160 psi (1,100 kPa)	178 psi (1,230 kPa)	175 psi (1,210 kPa)
Tractive effort at 75% working pressure	2,970 lbf (13.2 kN)	2,672 lbf	5,415 lbf (24.09 kN)	5,398 lbf (24.01 kN)	5,512 lbf
Weight in working order	6.98 long tons (7.82 short tons; 7.09 t)	6.38 long tons (7.15 short tons; 6.48 t)	14.05 long tons (15.74 short tons; 14.28 t)	14.50 long tons (16.24 short tons; 14.73 t)	17.09 long tons (19.14 short tons; 17.36 t)

=== Internal combustion ===
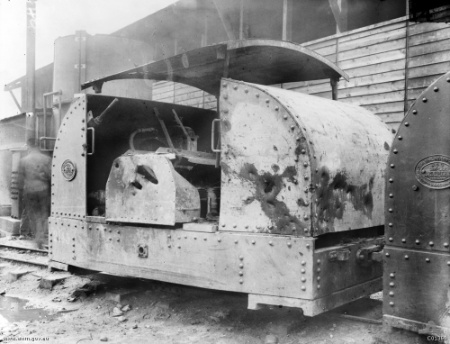
Western Front (Belgium), Ypres Area, Poperinghe. A 40 hp Simplex petrol locomotive that was damaged by shellfire and returned to the railway yard for repairs

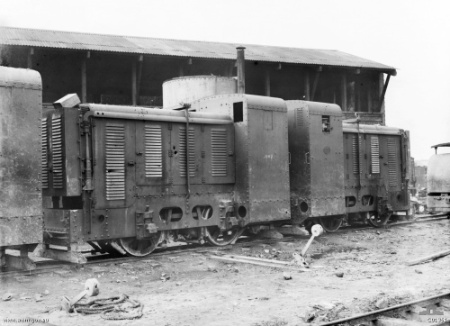
Western Front (Belgium), Ypres Area. A pair of petrol-electric locomotives

- Motor Rail (Simplex) 20 hp (15 kW), petrol
- Motor Rail (Simplex) 40 hp (30 kW), petrol
- British Westinghouse 45 hp (34 kW), petrol-electric
- Dick, Kerr & Co. 45 hp (34 kW), petrol-electric
- Baguley 10 hp (7.5 kW), petrol-paraffin engine based on a McEwan Pratt design

Dimensions

Dimension	Simplex 20 hp	Simplex 40 hp	Petrol-electric	McEwan Pratt
Overall length	8 ft 3 in (2,515 mm)	11 ft 2 in (3,404 mm)	15 ft 1 in (4,597 mm)	9 ft 0 in (2,743 mm)
Wheel diameter	1 ft 6 in (457 mm)	1 ft 6 in (457 mm)	2 ft 8 in (813 mm)	n/k
Weight loaded (long tons-cwt) short tons tonnes	1 long ton 18 cwt (2.1 short tons; 1.9 t)	6 long tons 3 cwt (6.9 short tons; 6.2 t)	8 long tons 0 cwt (9.0 short tons; 8.1 t)	1 long ton 18 cwt (2.1 short tons; 1.9 t)
Cylinders	2	4	4	2
Horsepower	20 hp (15 kW)	40 hp (30 kW)	55 hp (41 kW) (engine); 45 hp (34 kW) (motors)	10 hp (7.5 kW)

=== Captured ===
A few captured German feldbahn locomotives were also used but these usually had short lives because no spare parts were available for them.

== Other locomotives ==
Both the French Army and the U.S. Army had their own locomotives, which included:

=== French Army ===
- Decauville Progrès type 0-6-0T
- Pechot Bourdon 0-4-4-0T articulated locomotive
- Kerr, Stuart Decauville/Joffre type 0-6-0T+t (based on the Decauville Progrès type)

=== U.S. Army ===
- Baldwin 2-6-2T

== Preserved locomotives ==
=== Baldwin ===
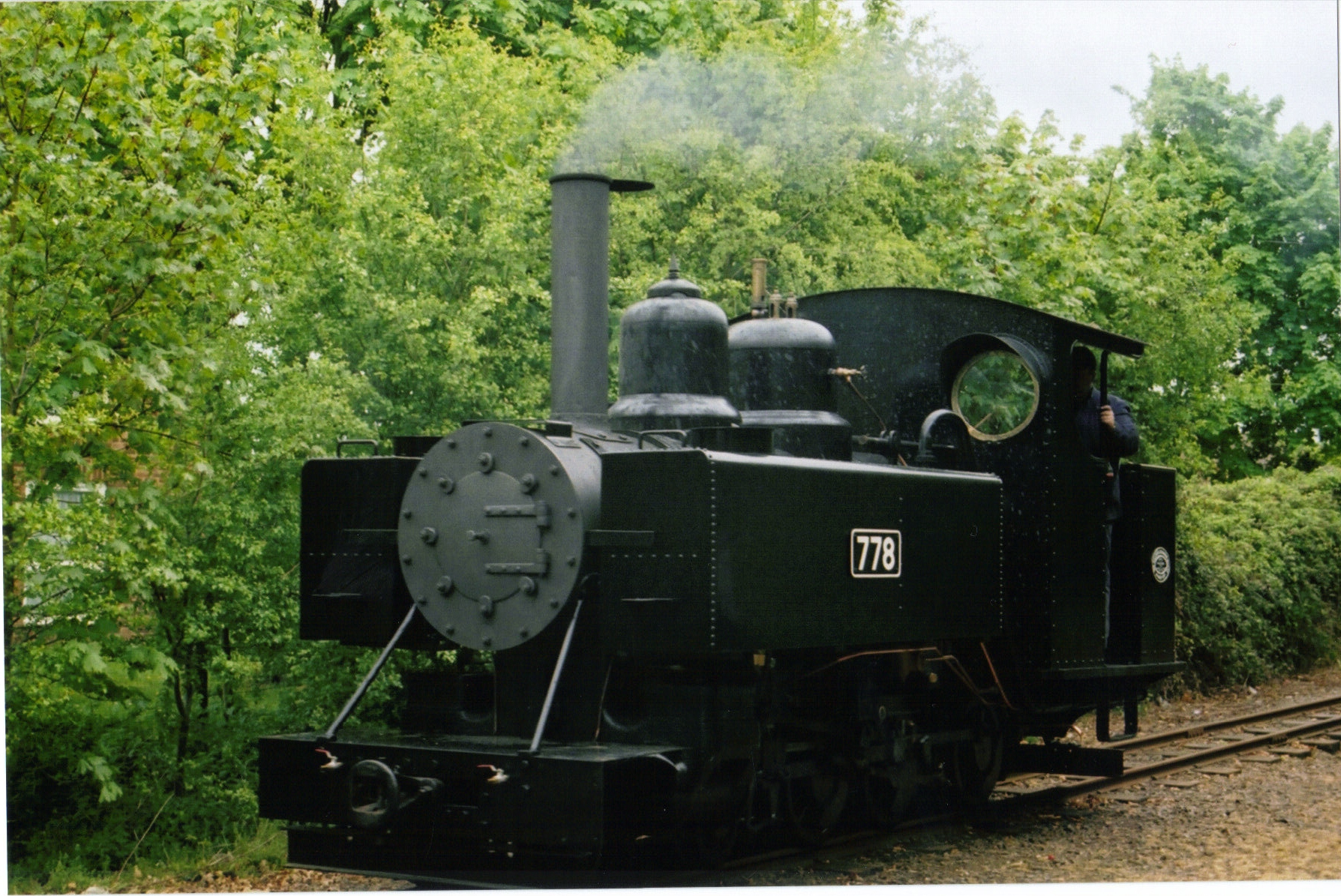
10-12-D No.778, one of the many that went to India, now runs at Leighton Buzzard Narrow Gauge Railway

Probably the most famous of these war service engines were of class 10-12-D, built by the Baldwin Locomotive Works, U.S. Nearly 500 were built and those that survived the war found new homes around the world. Many went to India and after the war a few went to railways in Britain including:

- Ashover Light Railway
- Glyn Valley Tramway
- Snailbeach District Railways
- Welsh Highland Railway
- Rainham Cement in Kent

Four of this type of locomotive have been repatriated from India and preserved in the UK, two in full working order, and the other two undergoing restoration in 2021.

=== Hunslet ===
Hunslet 4-6-0 Locomotive no. 1215 of 1916, was repatriated from Australia in 2008 where she had worked since 1924 on the sugar cane railways of Queensland, before ending up at Rowan Bay Bush Children's Home in a playground around 1962. She is currently in full working order at the Moseley Railway Trust's Apedale Valley Light Railway, Newcastle-under-Lyme, Staffordshire, United Kingdom.

Hunslet 4-6-0 Locomotive no. 1218 of 1916, formerly of Gin Gin Mill, is currently with D.Revell, Weewaa, New South Wales, Australia. This is the locomotive which is now preserved at the Australian War Memorial, Canberra, Australia, although she may be in store and not on public display.

Hunslet 4-6-0 Locomotive no. 1229 of 1916, formerly of Cattle Creek Mill, is currently stored at ANGRMS, Woodford QLD, Australia. Awaiting restoration.

Hunslet 4-6-0 Locomotive no. 1239 of 1916, retrieved from a public park in Mackay, restored at the Rail Workshops Museum, currently on display at the Rail Workshops Museum, North Ipswich, Queensland, Australia

=== The Motor Rail & Tramcar Co Ltd, ===
Surplus Motor Rail internal combustion locomotives were sold off after the war and provided service for decades in industrial narrow gauge railways systems, such as the Leighton Buzzard Light Railway. The larger (40HP) locomotives came in 'open', 'protected', and 'armoured' versions resulting in the curious spectacle of fully armoured locomotives appearing in an industrial context. Many locomotives were overhauled and/or modified by Kent Construction & Engineering Co. Ltd of Ashford which can complicate identifying locomotives (for example "Mary Ann" - the Ffestiniog Loco).

WDLR Number	Works Number	Year Built	Type	HP	Notes
	264	1916	4wPM	20	Welsh Highland Heritage Railway
LR2182	461	1917	4wPM	40	Armoured version. Greensand Railway Museum Trust
	507?	1917	4wPM	40	"Mary Ann". Open type. Works number uncertain Ffestiniog railway (since 1923), and the first loco to run on the preserved Ffestiniog Railway (in 1954).
LR3041	1320	1918	4wPM	40	Originally a protected version. Apedale Valley Light Railway.
LR3090	1369	1918	4wPM	40	Protected version. Apedale Valley Light Railway.
LR3098	1377	1918	4wPM	40	Protected version. National Railway Museum on loan to Leighton Buzzard Light Railway.
LR3101	1381	1918	4wPM	40	Protected version, restored as Open Version. Recently at Amberley Chalk Pits Museum
LR2478	1757	1918	4wPM	20	Apedale Valley Light Railway

== See also ==
- British military narrow-gauge railways
- Trench railways
- Light railway
- Railway Operating Division
- John Stewart
- Foley, Welch and Stewart
