= Lake Lock Rail Road =

Early narrow gauge railway built near Wakefield, West Yorkshire, England

The Lake Lock Rail Road was an early, approximately 3-mile (4.8 km) long, horse-drawn narrow gauge railway built near Wakefield, West Yorkshire, England. The railway is recognised as the world's first public railway, though other railway schemes around the same time also claim that distinction.

== The company ==
The Lake Lock Rail Road Company was formed in 1796 with the capital being raised from 128 shares. These were purchased by a broad range of people including a lawyer, banker, doctor, clergyman, merchant and widow. The initial route opened to traffic in 1798, pre-dating the Surrey Iron Railway by five years. It is thus the world's first public railway. The line was built to allow many independent users to haul wagons along the line on payment of a toll, so whilst other railways pre-dated the Lake Lock Railroad, authorisation under the Wakefield Inclosure Act 1793 (33 Geo. 3. c. 11 Pr.) meant that its status was defined as being public from the outset (unlike the nearby Middleton Railway, which was a private railway).

The railway commenced at Lake Lock, near Stanley, Wakefield on the Aire & Calder Navigation and ran broadly in a westerly direction to Outwood, a distance of approximately 3 miles (4.8 km). In 1804 the route was changed to avoid a steep incline and this resulted in the terminus relocating from Lake Lock to nearby Bottom boat. There were also a number of branches to collieries and a stone quarry. Extensions were constructed to East Ardsley and Kirkhamgate. A petition to submit a parliamentary bill to extend the railway was submitted to the House of Commons on 1 February 1811, and referred to committee.

== Operation ==
The primary purpose of the line was the carriage of coal from the various coal pits surrounding the line to the Aire & Calder Navigation for shipment elsewhere. Other goods carried include roadstone, timber and burnt lime. The load of three waggons was hauled by one horse with an average gradient of 1 in 70 (1.43%) down to the navigation. The track used edge rails to a gauge of 3 ft 4 3/4 in (1,035 mm). Goods were charged by toll, initially at 6d per ton, subsequently increasing to 10 1/2 d per ton. In 1807 110,000 tons were being carried each year, however this had reduced to 81,000 tons by 1819 with a further reduction to 76,000 tons in 1823. The line gradually declined and was closed in 1836 when the major colliery owner J & J Charlesworth built an alternative railway.
