= Minsterley railway station =

Former railway station in England

Minsterley
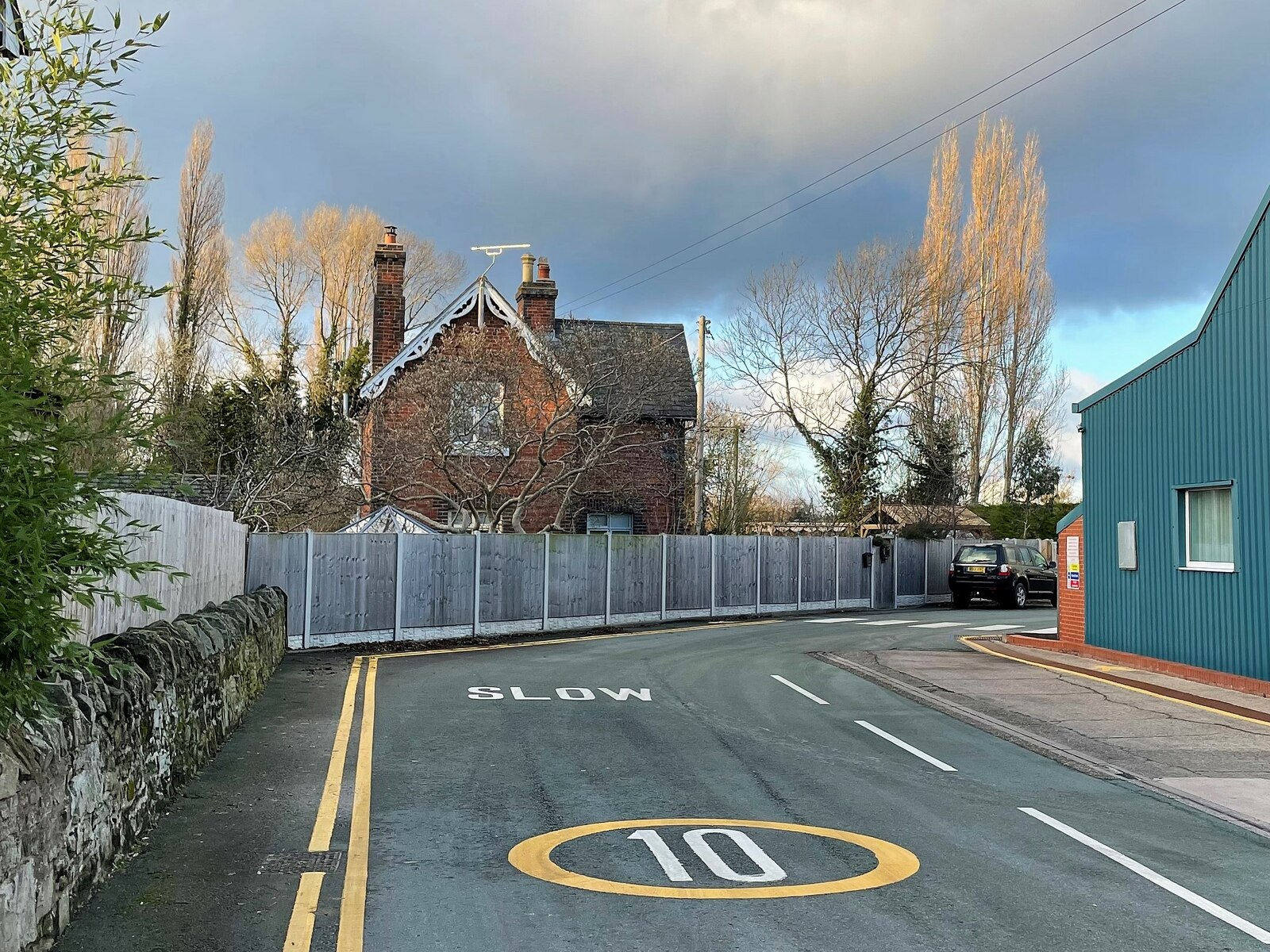

General information
- Location: Minsterley, Shropshire; England
- Coordinates: 52.6405°N 2.9248°W
- Grid reference: SJ376052
- Platforms: 1

Other information
- Status: Disused

History
- Original company: Shrewsbury and Welshpool Railway
- Pre-grouping: LNWR & GWR joint
- Post-grouping: LMS & GWR joint

Key dates
- 1861: Opened
- 5 February 1951: Closed for passengers
- 1967: closed for goods
Location

Minsterley railway station was a terminus station in Minsterley, Shropshire, England. The station was opened in 1861 and closed to passengers in 1951. The Minsterley station site has been used as a meat processing factory. A large dairy-related factory also exists on either side of the old trackbed (just before the terminus) and the stationmaster's house has been converted to a private residence.

Preceding station	Disused railways	Following station
Terminus	LNWR & GWR joint Minsterley branch line	Pontesbury; Line and station closed
