= Breidden railway station =

Former railway station in Powys, Wales

Breidden
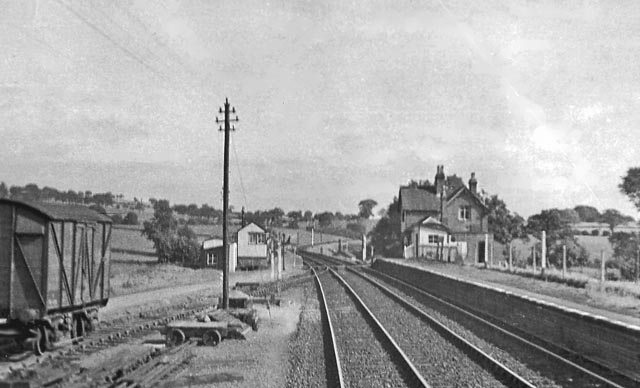

General information
- Location: Middletown, Powys; Wales
- Coordinates: 52.7019°N 3.0319°W
- Grid reference: SJ296151
- Platforms: 2

Other information
- Status: Disused

History
- Original company: Shrewsbury and Welshpool Railway
- Pre-grouping: GWR and LNWR joint
- Post-grouping: GWR and LMS joint

Key dates
- 1862: opened as Middletown Hills
- 1 June 1919: Renamed Middletown
- 1 February 1928: Named Breidden
- 12 September 1960: Closed
Location

Breidden railway station was a station in Middletown, Powys, Wales. The station closed in 1960. There was a station house and two staggered platforms as well as a goods siding. The station has been demolished.

Preceding station	Disused railways	Following station
Buttington; Line open, station closed	GWR and LNWR joint Shrewsbury and Welshpool Railway	Plas-y-Court Halt; Line open, station closed
