= Pontesbury railway station =

Former railway station in Shropshire, England

Pontesbury
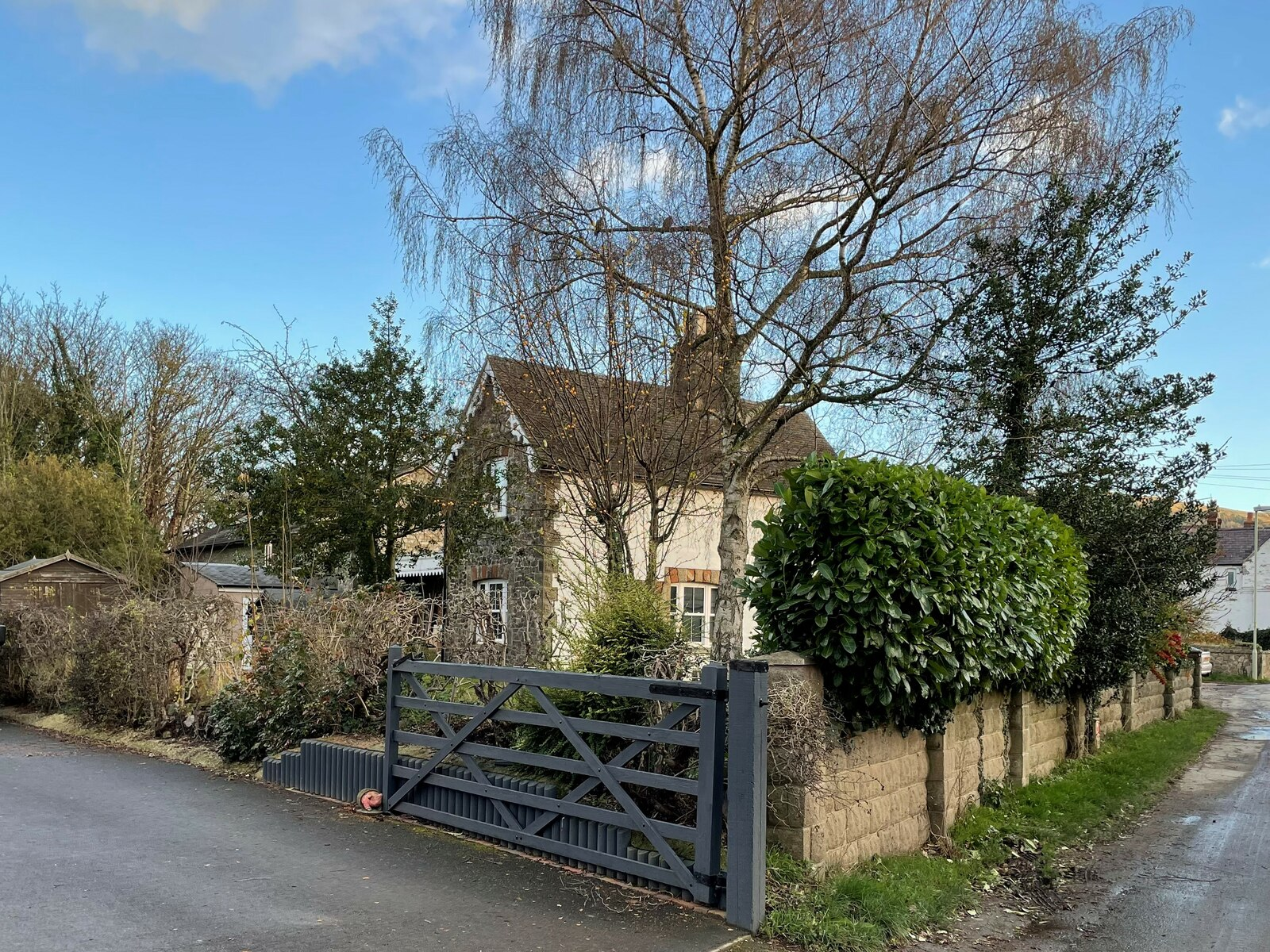

General information
- Location: Pontesbury, Shropshire; England
- Coordinates: 52.6516°N 2.8921°W
- Grid reference: SJ397063
- Platforms: 1

Other information
- Status: Disused

History
- Original company: Shrewsbury and Welshpool Railway
- Pre-grouping: LNWR & GWR joint
- Post-grouping: LMS & GWR joint

Key dates
- 14 February 1861: Opened
- 5 February 1951: Closed
Location

Pontesbury railway station was a station in Pontesbury, Shropshire, England. The station was opened in 1861 and closed in 1951.

Preceding station	Disused railways	Following station
Minsterley; Line and station closed	LNWR & GWR joint Minsterley branch line	Plealey Road; Line and station closed
