= Hanwood railway station =

Former railway station in Shropshire, England

Hanwood
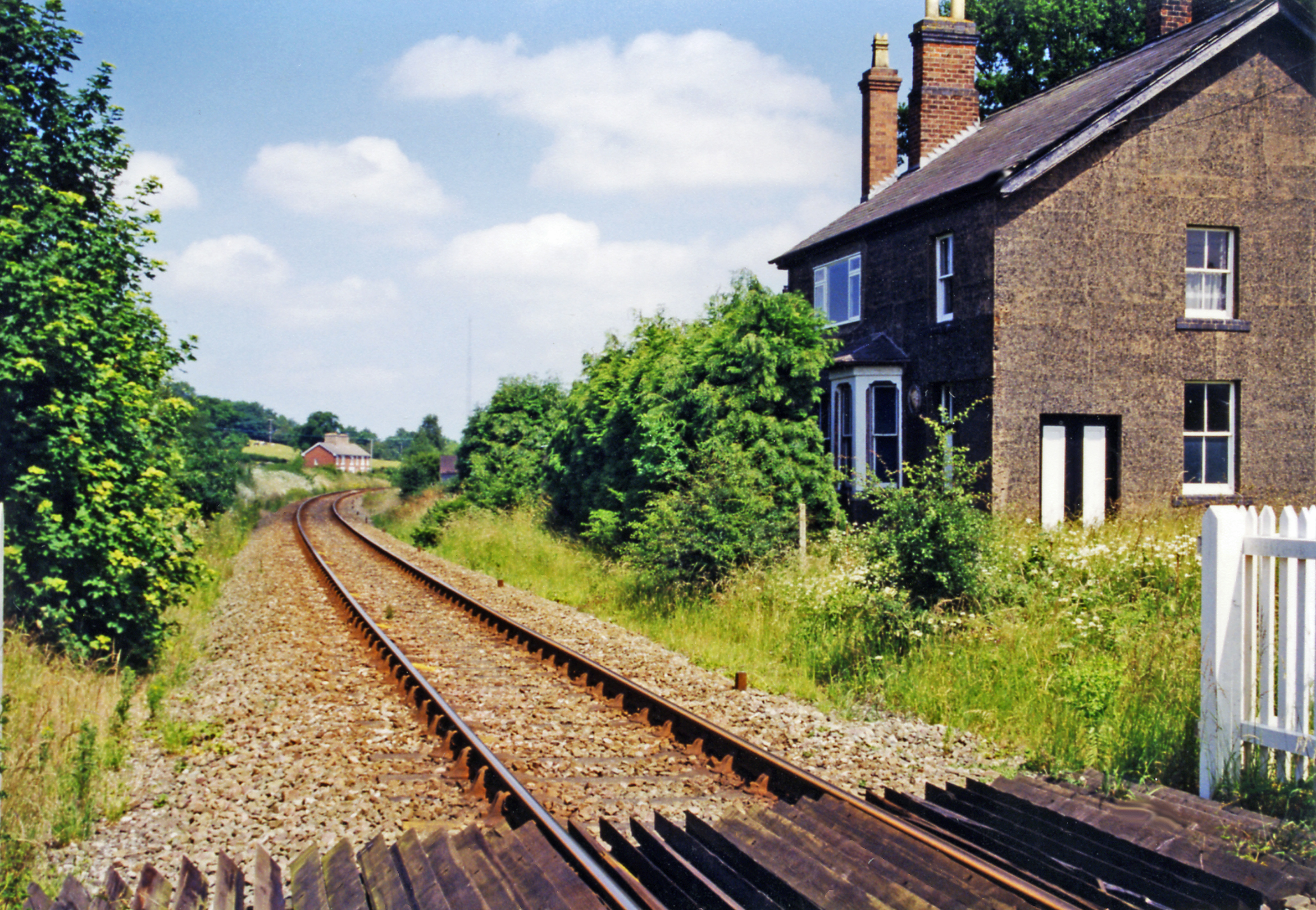

General information
- Location: Hanwood, Shropshire; England
- Coordinates: 52.6815°N 2.8284°W
- Grid reference: SJ440096
- Platforms: 2

Other information
- Status: Disused

History
- Original company: Shrewsbury and Welshpool Railway
- Pre-grouping: LNWR & GWR joint
- Post-grouping: LMS & GWR joint

Key dates
- 1861: Opened
- 1960: Closed for passengers
Location

Hanwood railway station was a station in Hanwood, Shropshire, England. The station was opened in 1861 and closed to passengers in 1960, and to goods traffic in 1964.

== Proposed reopening ==
In 2015, the Shrewsbury and Aberystwyth Rail Passenger Association released an aims document that mentions the possibility of reopening the station, along with Bow Street and Carno stations.

Preceding station	Disused railways	Following station
Yockleton; Line open, station closed	LNWR & GWR joint Shrewsbury and Welshpool Railway	Shrewsbury; Line and station open
Plealey Road; Line and station closed	LNWR & GWR joint Minsterley branch line	Shrewsbury; Line and station open
