= Aston Pigott =

Hamlet in Shropshire, England

Coordinates: 52.646°N 2.978°W

- Location within Shropshire
- OS grid reference: SJ338058
- Civil parish: Worthen with Shelve
- Unitary authority: Shropshire
- Ceremonial county: Shropshire
- Region: West Midlands
- Country: England
- Sovereign state: United Kingdom
- Post town: SHREWSBURY
- Postcode district: SY5
- Dialling code: 01743
- Police: West Mercia
- Fire: Shropshire
- Ambulance: West Midlands
- UK Parliament: Ludlow

Aston Pigott is a hamlet approximately 12 miles west of Shrewsbury within the parish of Worthen and Shelve. The current population stands at around 50.

The hamlet is situated on a small rise giving many of the properties an outstanding view across the Rea Brook valley to the Stiperstones.

It contains two working farms that are mainly dairy and lamb farms. The hamlet is served primarily by Worthen which is 1 mile to the west. It adjoins Aston Rogers.

The name Aston Pigott probably evolved from East Tun or Town and from the name of the Picot family of Norman descent. In 1180 Ralph Fitz Picot was granted lands by the Corbets, and it was Ralph's descendants, notably Robert Pigot in 1255 followed by Howel Pigot who established the modern village name.

Mains water arrived in 1947 and mains electricity in 1948.

== See also ==
- Listed buildings in Worthen with Shelve
