= Westbury railway station (Shropshire) =

Former railway station in Shropshire, England

Westbury (Salop)
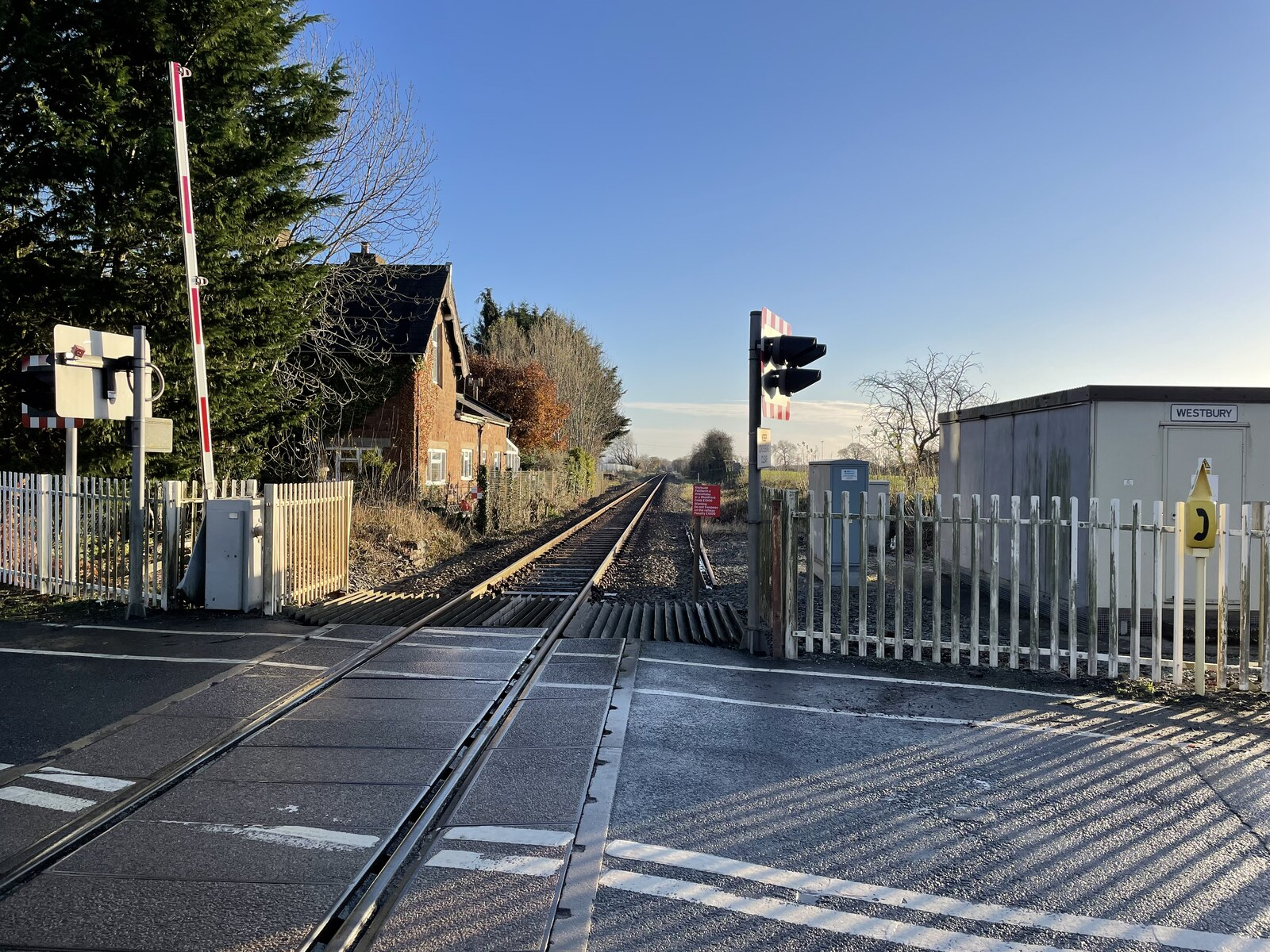

General information
- Location: Westbury, Shropshire; England
- Coordinates: 52.6925°N 2.9684°W
- Grid reference: SJ346109
- Platforms: 2

Other information
- Status: Disused

History
- Original company: Shrewsbury and Welshpool Railway
- Pre-grouping: LNWR and GWR joint
- Post-grouping: LMS and GWR joint

Key dates
- 1862: Opened
- 1960: Closed
Location

Westbury railway station served the village of Westbury, Shropshire, England between 1862 and 1960.

== History ==
The station was opened in 1862 by the Shrewsbury and Welshpool Railway company; it later came under the joint control of the Great Western Railway and the London and North Western Railway.

It was closed on 12 September 1960, along with all other intermediate stations. It retained its passing loop and signal box until 1988, when the modernisation scheme for the line saw Radio Electronic Token Block signalling commissioned; all remaining manual signal boxes closed and control passed to the signalling centre at Machynlleth.

Just a year earlier, the loop was the site of a head-on collision between two passenger trains after one passed a signal at danger. One of the two Class 150 Sprinter diesel multiple units involved was derailed and 37 people were injured.

Preceding station	Disused railways	Following station
Plas-y-Court Halt; Line open, station closed	LNWR and GWR joint Shrewsbury and Welshpool Railway	Yockleton; Line open, station closed

== The site today ==
The former main building survives here in occupation as a private house, along with the now automatic level crossing over the B4387 road.

Transport for Wales services continue to run through the former station site between Birmingham International and Machynlleth.
