= Plas-y-Court Halt railway station =

Former railway station in Shropshire, England

Plas-y-Court Halt
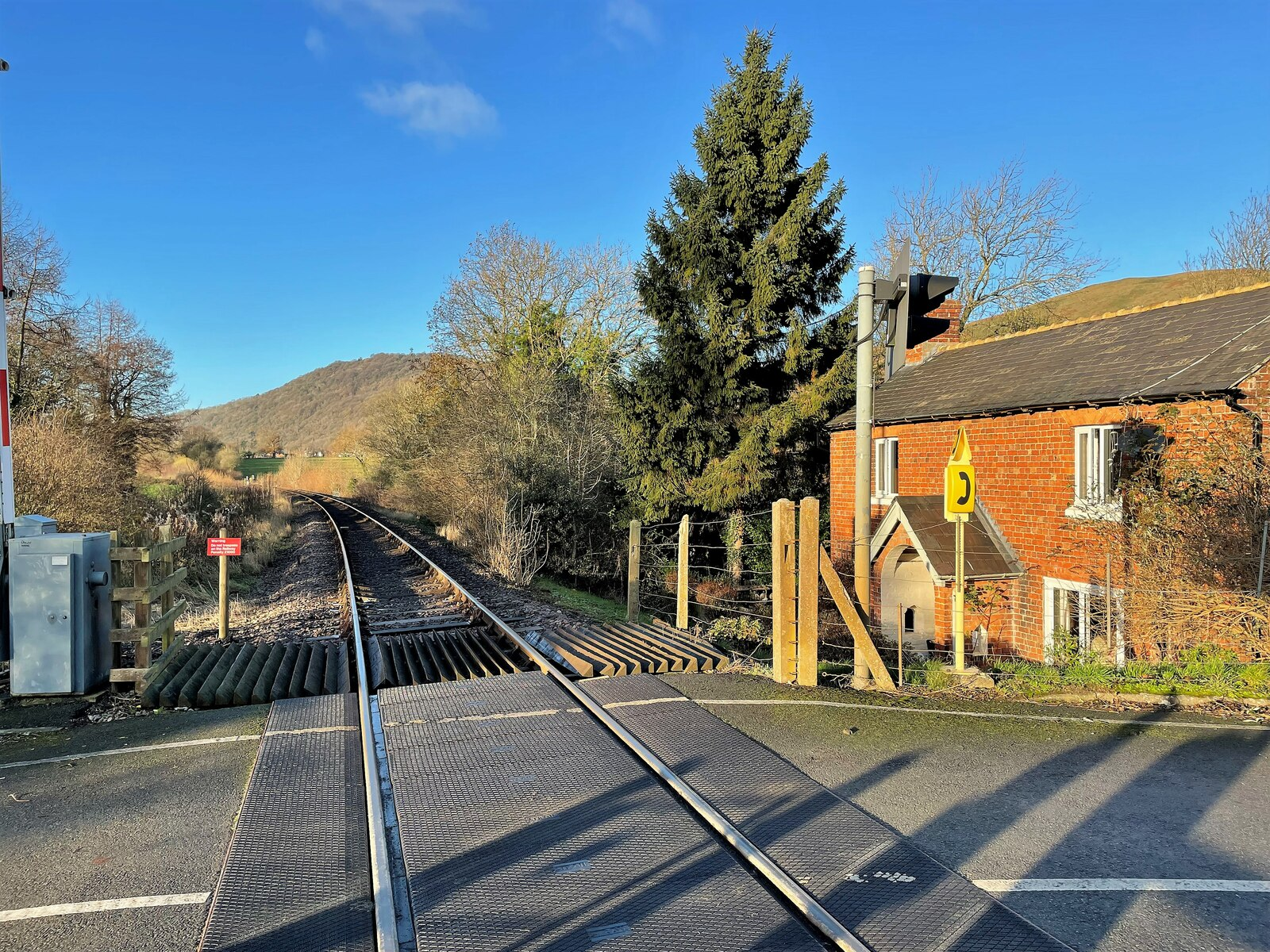

General information
- Location: West of Wollaston, Shropshire; England
- Coordinates: 52.7049°N 3.0165°W
- Grid reference: SJ315124
- Platforms: 1

Other information
- Status: Disused

History
- Original company: Shrewsbury and Welshpool Railway
- Post-grouping: LMS and GWR joint

Key dates
- 1934: Opened
- 1960: Closed
Location

Plas-y-Court Halt railway station was a railway station to the west of Wollaston, Shropshire, England. The station opened in 1934 and closed in 1960. The halt was situated to the east side of a gated level crossing and on the south side of the line opposite the crossing keeper's cottage. It was made of timber and had a waiting shelter. The halt has been demolished but the crossing keeper's cottage remains as a private residence.

| Preceding station | Disused railways | Following station |
|---|---|---|
| Breidden; Line open, station closed | LNWR and GWR joint Shrewsbury and Welshpool Railway | Westbury; Line open, station closed |
