= Yockleton railway station =

Former railway station in Shropshire, England

Yockleton
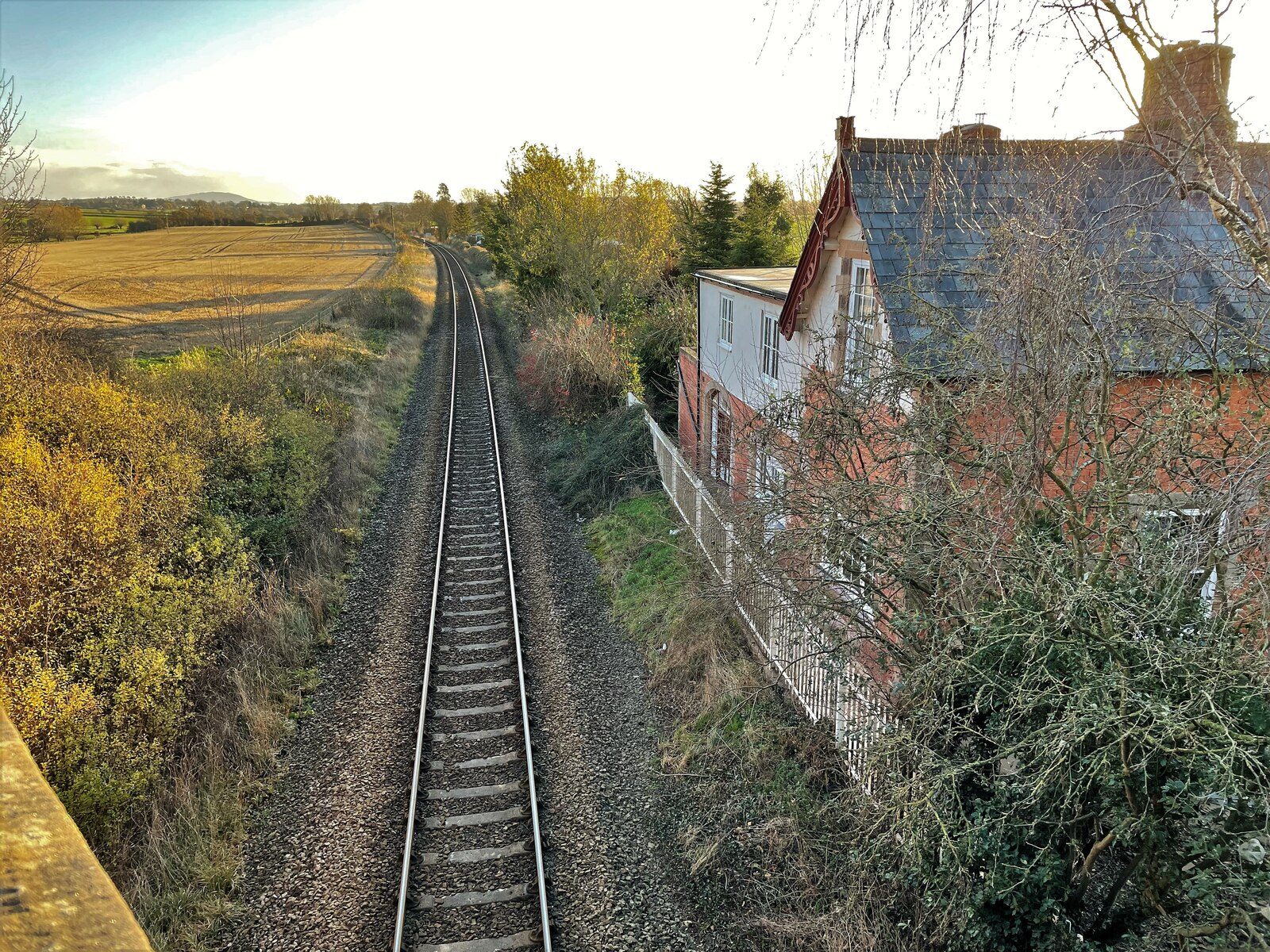

General information
- Location: Yockleton, Shropshire; England
- Coordinates: 52.6867°N 2.8828°W
- Grid reference: SJ404102
- Platforms: 1

Other information
- Status: Disused

History
- Original company: Shrewsbury and Welshpool Railway
- Pre-grouping: LNWR and GWR joint
- Post-grouping: LMS and GWR joint

Key dates
- 27 January 1862: Opened
- 12 September 1960: Closed
Location

Yockleton railway station was a station in Yockleton, Shropshire, England. The station was opened in 1862 and closed in 1960.

| Preceding station | Disused railways | Following station |
|---|---|---|
| Westbury; Line open, station closed | LNWR and GWR joint Shrewsbury and Welshpool Railway | Hanwood; Line open, station closed |
