= Plealey Road railway station =

Former railway station in Shropshire, England

Plealey Road
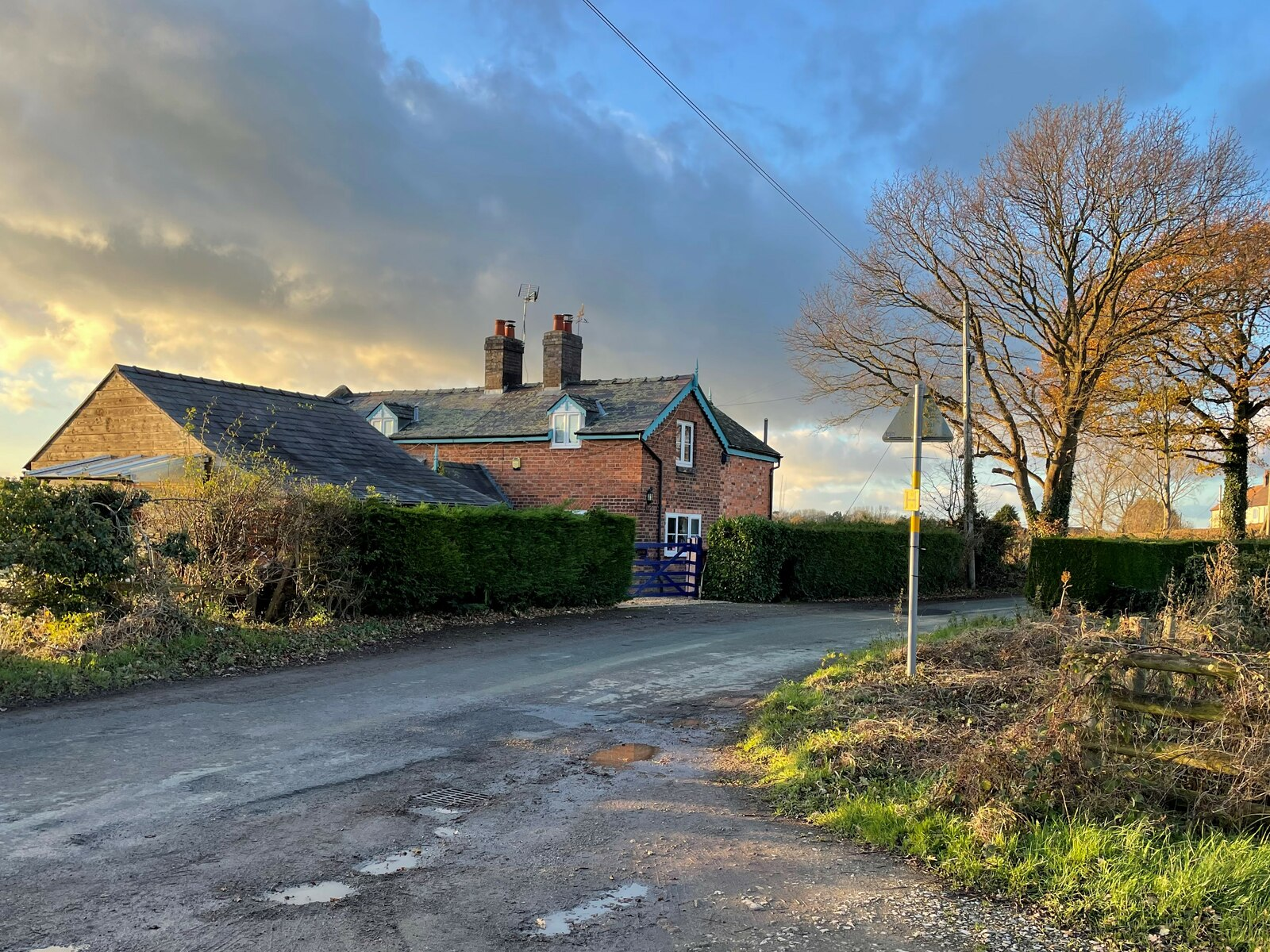

General information
- Location: North of Plealey, Shropshire; England
- Coordinates: 52.6627°N 2.8624°W
- Grid reference: SJ418076

Other information
- Status: Disused

History
- Original company: Shrewsbury and Welshpool Railway
- Pre-grouping: LNWR and GWR joint
- Post-grouping: LMS and GWR joint

Key dates
- 14 February 1861: Opened
- 5 February 1951: Closed
Location

Plealey Road railway station was a station to the north of Plealey, Shropshire, England. The station was opened in 1861 and closed in 1951. The station was single track to the south of the level crossing. On the northern side was a goods yard with passing loop or goods loop equipped with a loading gauge

Preceding station	Disused railways	Following station
Pontesbury; Line and station closed	LNWR and GWR joint Minsterley branch line	Hanwood; Line closed, station closed
