= Listed buildings in Worthen with Shelve =

Worthen with Shelve is a civil parish in Shropshire, England. It contains 88 listed buildings that are recorded in the National Heritage List for England. Of these, one is listed at Grade I, the highest of the three grades, four are at Grade II*, the middle grade, and the others are at Grade II, the lowest grade. The parish contains two contrasting regions. The region to the northwest is mainly rural, and contains villages and smaller settlements, including Worthen, Aston Pigott, and Brockton. In this region, most of the listed buildings are houses, cottages, farmhouses and farm buildings, many of which are timber framed. The region also includes churches, public houses, a country house and associated structures, a bridge, milestones, pumps, and a war memorial. The southeast region is more hilly and during the 19th century was an important area for lead mining, particularly the area around Snailbeach. Some of the areas containing the former lead mines are designated as scheduled monuments. The listed buildings relating to the lead mining industry include chimneys, engine houses, and winding engine houses, some of which are in ruins, and a locomotive shed.

== Key ==
Grade	Criteria
I	Buildings of exceptional interest, sometimes considered to be internationally important
II*	Particularly important buildings of more than special interest
II	Buildings of national importance and special interest

== Buildings ==
Name and location	Photograph	Date	Notes	Grade
All Saints Church, Worthen; 52.63578°N 2.99394°W		Late 12th century	The oldest part of the church is the base of the tower, the chancel dates from 1761, and the church was restored in 1846–47, when the vestry was added, and again in 1924. The church is built mainly in limestone with red sandstone dressings, the chancel is in red brick, and the roofs are slated. The church consists of a nave, a south porch, a chancel with a southeast vestry, and a north tower. The tower has massive buttresses, angle quoins, a clock face, a Perpendicular top stage, a parapet with corner obelisks, and a pyramidal roof with a lead spirelet and a brass weathercock.	I
Cruck Barn, Binweston Farm; 52.63045°N 3.03339°W	—	14th or 15th century	Originally a tithe barn, later a cowshed, it was extended in the 17th century and rebuilt in concrete blocks in the 20th century. The barn originally had six bays, and was later extended by three or four bays. Inside there are seven massive true cruck trusses.	II*
Fragment of wall, Leigh Hall; 52.62548°N 2.98563°W	—	14th or 15th century (probable)	The wall is in quartzite and limestone on a plinth, and is part of a wall that formerly ran around inner edge of a rectangular moated house platform. It is about 2.5 metres (8 ft 2 in) high and 5 metres (16 ft) long, and includes a right-angled turn.	II
Walton Hall Farmhouse; 52.64134°N 3.03723°W	—	15th century	The farmhouse has been remodelled and extended. The early part is timber framed, with rendering and cladding in iron sheeting, the rebuilding is in brick, and the roofs are slated. There is one storey and an attic, and the farmhouse consists of a five-bay hall range, and a four-bay cross-wing extending to the right. In front of the hall range is a two-storey gabled porch. To the left of the porch is a sash window, the other windows are casements, and in both ranges are gabled eaves dormers.	II*
Binweston Farmhouse; 52.63007°N 3.03411°W		c. 1500	The oldest part of the former manor house is the hall range, with two gabled projections added in the late 16th century. The house is timber framed with plaster and painted brick infill and a slate roof. There are two storeys and cellars, and the hall range has seven bays, the left projection is a two-storey porch, and the right projection is a cross-wing. The porch has a jettied upper storey and gable, both having bressumers with vine-leaf carving; the upper storey and gable of the cross-wing are also jettied. To the right of the cross-wing is a smaller porch. The windows are casements, and the doorway has a moulded surround, a cambered head, and carving in the spandrels.	II*
Pond House Farmhouse; 52.65272°N 2.97381°W	—	Late 15th or early 16th century	The farmhouse was extended in the 17th century. It is timber framed with painted brick infill, some cladding and rebuilding in red brick, and the roof is slated. There are two storeys, the original part is a four-bay hall range, and a two-bay cross-wing was added later. In the angle is a gabled porch, above the door is a fanlight, and the windows are casements. Inside there is a large inglenook fireplace.	II
Worthen Hall Farmhouse; 52.63683°N 2.99279°W	—	c. 1590	The farmhouse has a timber framed core with brick infill, it is roughcast, and has slate roofs. There are two storeys and attic, and it has a T-shaped plan, consisting of a 3½ -bay hall range and a cross-wing. The upper storey and attic are jettied. In the centre is a gabled porch with a round-headed arch, and a doorway with a rectangular fanlight, and the windows are casements.	II
Lady House Farmhouse; 52.61534°N 2.96784°W	—	c. 1600 (probable)	The farmhouse was extended in the 18th and the 20th centuries. The early part is in rendered timber framing, the extension is in rendered brick, and the roof is partly slated and partly tiled. There are two storeys and attics, the original part has three or four bays, and the extensions consist of a short range at right angles to the rear, a roughly parallel range at the rear, and a further extension to the left. On the front is a lean-to porch, and the windows are casements.	II
School Bank; 52.61613°N 3.00359°W	—	c. 1600	A farmhouse, later divided into two cottages, it is timber framed with plaster infill, on a painted brick plinth, and has a tile roof. There are two storeys and an L-shaped plan, consisting of a main range and a cross-wing projecting at the rear. The doorways have bracketed lean-to hoods, the windows are three-light cast iron Gothic casements, and there is a gabled half-dormer.	II
Venus Bank Farmhouse; 52.60516°N 2.95645°W	—	c. 1600	The farmhouse, which was later altered and extended, is timber framed with painted brick infill, rebuilding and cladding in brick, it is roughcast at the rear, and has a tile roof. There are two storeys, and the farmhouse consists of a four-bay hall range, a cross-wing projecting to the right, and a stone lean-to dairy at the rear. The windows are casements and there is a gabled dormer.	II
School Farmhouse; 52.61721°N 3.00465°W	—	Late 16th or early 17th century	The farmhouse was remodelled and extended in the 19th century. It is roughcast, probably over a timber framed core, on a plinth of painted brick and stone, the back wall, right gable end, and extension to the left are in stone, and the roof is in tile and slate. There are two storeys, one fixed window, and the other windows are casements.	II
Bromlow Hall Farmhouse; 52.61678°N 3.00262°W	—	Early 17th century	The farmhouse is timber framed with plaster and painted brick infill and a tile roof. There is one storey and an attic, and four or five bays. The right bay is gabled, with a moulded bressumer and cusped bargeboards. The doorway has a gabled hood, the windows are casements, and there is a gabled eaves dormer.	II
Brook End and Brookside Cottage; 52.63461°N 2.99555°W	—	Early 17th century	A house, extended later in the 17th century and subsequently divided, it is timber framed with plaster and painted brick infill, and has an oak shingle roof. There is one storey and attics, and five bays. On the front of Brookside Cottage is a gabled porch, the windows in the ground floor are casements, and both parts have raking dormers with horizontally-sliding sash windows.	II
Church Bank; 52.65128°N 3.02665°W	—	Early 17th century	A timber framed cottage with infill partly in wattle and daub and partly in painted brick, on a limestone plinth, with a corrugated iron roof. There is one storey and an attic, and two bays. The windows are casements, and there is a flat-roofed eaves dormer.	II
Hamptonhayes Farmhouse; 52.65257°N 3.00112°W	—	Early 17th century	The farmhouse was later remodelled and extended. The early part is timber framed with painted brick infill, the rebuilding is in red brick, the front is roughcast, and the roof is slated. There is one storey and an attic, and the farmhouse consists of a two-bay hall range and a two-bay cross-wing projecting to the right. The porch is in the angle, the windows are casements, and there are three gabled eaves dormers in the hall range. Inside, there is timber-framed panelling and an inglenook fireplace.	II
Hogstow Farmhouse; 52.60091°N 2.94484°W	—	Early 17th century (probable)	The farmhouse, which possibly incorporates parts of an earlier building, was partly rebuilt in the 18th century. It is timber framed with red brick infill, the rebuilding is in red brick, the extension is in limestone, and the roof is partly tiled and partly in corrugated iron. There are two storeys, the windows are casements, and the doorway has a segmental head. Inside, there is an inglenook fireplace.	II
New Mills Farmhouse; 52.63837°N 3.02096°W	—	Early 17th century	The farmhouse, which was later altered and expanded, is timber framed with painted brick infill on a limestone plinth with a tile roof. There are two storeys and three bays. The windows are a mix of casements and sashes, one of which is horizontally-sliding.	II
Barn, School Farm; 52.61664°N 3.00407°W	—	Early 17th century	The barn is timber framed with weatherboarding, and has a roof of corrugated iron over thatch. There is one level, and the barn contains double doors, another doorway, and a cart entrance.	II
Shelfield Farmhouse; 52.59256°N 2.97105°W	—	Early 17th century	The farmhouse is timber framed with brick infill, the front wall has been rebuilt in stone and roughcast, and the roof is slated. There is one storey and an attic, and five bays. The doorway is in a lean-to projection, the windows are casements, and there are three gabled eaves dormers. Inside, there is a large inglenook fireplace.	II
7 and 9 Hamptonbeech; 52.64190°N 3.02417°W	—	17th century	A house, later two cottages, the building is timber framed with painted brick infill on a stone plinth and has a slate roof. There is one storey and an attic, and three or four bays. On the front is a gabled porch, the windows are casements, and there is a gabled half-dormer.	II
Barn north of Binweston Farmhouse; 52.63033°N 3.03422°W	—	17th century (probable)	The barn, which was extended in the 18th century, is partly in weatherboarded timber framing, and partly in red brick, and it has slate roofs. There are two levels, the original range has five bays, and the extension has two bays at right angles. The barn contains a wide cart entrance, a door and a stable door, and an eaves hatch. Some of the internal timber framing has wattle and daub infill.	II
Barn northeast of Binweston Farmhouse; 52.63078°N 3.03306°W	—	17th century	The barn, later converted into a cowhouse, is timber framed with weather boarding on a plinth of red brick and stone, and it has a slate roof. There are two levels, three bays, a hatched opening to the left and a doorway to the right.	II
Brook House Farmhouse; 52.63107°N 3.03488°W	—	17th century	The farmhouse was extended in the 18th century, and a range was added to the right in the 19th century. The original parts are timber framed with red brick infill and a slate roof. There are two storeys and three or four bays, and the windows are casements. The range to the right is in red brick, and has a dentilled eaves cornice, two storeys, and three bays. The central doorway has pilasters, panelled revels, a rectangular fanlight, and a bracketed hood, and the casement windows have segmental heads.	II
Outbuilding, Church Bank; 52.65153°N 3.02701°W	—	17th century	A cottage, later an outbuilding, it has been extended. The building is in weatherboarded timber framing on a stone plinth, the left gable end is clad in corrugated iron, the extension is in limestone, and the roof is in corrugated iron. It contains a central door approached by external steps, and a subsidiary door.	II
Lower Farmhouse; 52.60504°N 3.01669°W	—	17th century	The farmhouse, later a private house, was altered and extended in the 19th century. It is in rendered timber framing and painted limestone, and has a slate roof. There are two storeys and four bays. On the front is a doorway with a gabled hood, and the windows are casements. Inside, there is exposed timber framing, and an inglenook fireplace.	II
Lower Santley; 52.59963°N 2.95844°W	—	17th century	The farmhouse was altered and extended in the 18th century. It is timber framed on a stone plinth, the front has been rebuilt in stone and roughcast, and the roof is slated. There are two storeys, three bays, and a lean-to dairy at the rear. On the front is a gabled porch, there is another doorway with a gabled hood, and the windows are casements. Inside there is an inglenook fireplace.	II
Meadowtown Hall Farmhouse; 52.60409°N 3.01831°W	—	17th century	The farmhouse, which was remodelled in the 18th century, is timber framed with painted brick infill and a tile roof. There are two storeys and five bays, and the windows are casements.	II
Barn, Mere Oak Farm; 52.65060°N 3.02928°W	—	17th century	The barn is timber framed with corrugated iron cladding, weatherboarding on the gable ends, and a corrugated iron roof. There are two levels and three bays. The barn contains a door and two windows.	II
Millhouse; 52.63516°N 3.00866°W	—	17th century (probable)	The house, which was extended in the 19th century, is in roughcast timber framing on massive natural rook foundations at the front, and it has slate roofs. There are two storeys, and a single-storey extension on the left. Also on the left is a stepped chimney breast, and the windows are casements.	II
Barn, Bird Farm; 52.63633°N 2.99543°W	—	Mid to late 17th century	The barn is timber framed with red brick infill on the north side and west gable end, weatherboarding on the north side and east gable end, and a corrugated iron roof. There are two levels and three bays. The barn contains two stable doors approached by external steps, a wide entrance, a segmental-headed doorway, and an eaves hatch.	II
Barn, Bank Farm; 52.64533°N 2.98127°W	—	Late 17th century	The barn was partly rebuilt in the 18th century. It is partly timber framed with red brick infill on a high brick plinth, and partly in red brick. There are two levels and an L-shaped plan, with a west range and a northeast range; the former has a slate roof and the latter a tile roof. The barn contains a wide threshing entrance, doorways, eaves hatches, a cart bay, and air vents.	II
Leigh Hall Farmhouse; 52.62586°N 2.98665°W	—	Late 17th century	The farmhouse was remodelled and extended in the 19th century. The older part is in roughcast timber framing, the later parts are in limestone and red brick, and the roof is slated. There are two storeys and an attic, and there is a lean-to dairy on the left. There is one sash window, and the other windows are casements.	II
Barn south of Pond House Farmhouse; 52.65232°N 2.97342°W	—	Late 17th century	The barn is timber framed with weatherboarding and cladding in corrugated iron, on a plinth of limestone and brick, and it has a tile roof. There are two levels and five bays, and the barn contains three doors and five eaves hatches.	II
Rose Cottage; 52.63713°N 2.99621°W	—	Late 17th century	A timber framed farmhouse with later alterations, it has painted brick infill and gable ends, and a tile roof. There is one storey and an attic, and three or four bays. On the front is a gabled porch and a doorway with a semicircular fanlight. The windows are multi-paned casements with bracketed gabled hoods, and there are three gabled eaves dormers.	II
Rowley Farmhouse; 52.64747°N 3.03909°W	—	Late 17th century	The farmhouse was extended in the 18th century and later. The early part is timber framed with painted infill on a stone plinth, the extension is in stone, the roof is slateed, and there is slate hanging on the left gable end. There are two storeys, five bays, and a lean-to dairy on the right. The doorway has pilasters and a flat hood, and the windows are casements.	II
Barn, Rowley Farm; 52.64738°N 3.03938°W	—	Late 17th century	The barn, which has been altered and extended, is timber framed, clad in weatherboarding and corrugated iron, it is on a stone plinth, and has a corrugated iron roof. There are two levels, and a gabled extension in the centre. The barn contains stable doors and eaves hatches.	II
Barn and cottage northeast of The Chestnuts; 52.63360°N 3.00931°W	—	Late 17th century	The barn, later a stable, is the older, it is timber framed with red brick infill, and has a slate roof. There are two levels, and it contains doorways and two eaves hatches. The cottage attached to the north dates from the late 18th or early 19th century, and is in painted limestone with a tile roof. It has two storeys and contains doorways and casement windows.	II
Hampton Hall; 52.64392°N 3.02092°W	—	1681–86	A country house incorporating earlier material, it was altered in 1749 and extended in 1938. The house is in brick with slate roofs, and consists of a central block, flanking projecting wings, and a recessed extension to the rear on the left. The central block has two storeys, an attic and a basement, and seven bays. Twelve steps lead up to a central sandstone porch that has round-headed arches on three sides and a shaped pediment broken by a coat of arms. The windows in the ground floor are sashes, in the upper floor are three central rectangular panels, flanked by two circular windows on each side, some of which are blind, and at the top is a parapet and crow-stepped gable ends. Both wings have two storeys over a semi-basement, two bays, and hipped roof, and most windows are sashes. The right wing contains a two-storey sandstone bow with a parapet surmounted by a stone eagle with outstretched wings. In the ground floor is a doorway with a triangular pediment, above is a curved Venetian window with Ionic capitals.	II*
The Cock Inn; 52.63373°N 3.00989°W		Mid 18th century (probable)	A house, later a public house, it is in brick, the front and gable ends are roughcast, and the roof is tiled. There are two storeys and five bays. On the front is a gabled porch and a segmental-headed doorway to the right, and the windows are casements.	II
Old Cornmill; 52.63492°N 3.00946°W	—	Mid to late 18th century (probable)	A mill, extended in the 19th century, and converted into domestic accommodation. The early part is in limestone, it is gabled, and has three storeys and a basement, the extension to the left is in brick with a dentilled eaves cornice, and has two storeys; the roof of both parts is slated. The windows are 20th-century top-hung casements with original segmental heads. At the rear is a mill race with an iron wheel and pumping equipment.	II
Aston Pigott Farmhouse and barn 52.64732°N 2.97990°W	—	Late 18th century	The farmhouse and attached barn are in brick. The house has bands, a slate roof, two storeys and an attic, three bays, and a rear extension. In the centre is a Neoclassical porch, the windows are sashes, and there are gabled eaves dormers. The barn, which has been partly converted for domestic use, has a tile roof with a crow-stepped left gable, a dentilled eaves cornice, two levels and six bays. It contains an infilled threshing entrance, doorways, eaves hatches, sash windows, one horizontally-sliding, and rows of air vents.	II
Wall southeast of Hampton Hall; 52.64397°N 3.02015°W	—	Late 18th century	The garden wall is attached to the southeast corner of the hall, and is in red brick with sandstone coping. The wall is about 80 metres (260 ft) long.	II
Wall southwest of Hampton Hall; 52.64363°N 3.02143°W	—	Late 18th century	The garden wall is attached to the southwest corner of the 1938 extension to the hall. It is in red brick with sandstone coping, it is about 80 metres (260 ft) long, and has a short section at right angles to the southeast. The wall contains pilasters and has an entrance near its centre.	II
Holly Cottage; 52.60416°N 2.99463°W	—	Late 18th century	The cottage is in limewashed limestone with a slate roof. There are two storeys, and attached to the right gable end is a former cowshed. The windows are casements, and there are two doorways with segmental heads.	II
Bank Farmhouse; 52.64561°N 2.98097°W	—	c. 1800	The remodelling of an older farmhouse, later a private house, it is in red brick with a dentilled eaves cornice and a tile roof. There are two storeys and an attic, three bays, and a lower gabled rear range with an outshut. The porch has a round-headed arch, and the windows are casements. Inside, there is a large brick inglenook fireplace.	II
Old Vicarage; 52.63631°N 2.99528°W	—	c. 1800	The vicarage, later a private house, is in red brick with a dentilled eaves cornice and a tile roof. There are two storeys and three bays. The central doorway has pilasters, panelled reveals, and an open pediment, and the windows are sashes with slightly cambered heads.	II
Cottage and outbuilding, Blakemoorgate; 52.60443°N 2.91978°W		Late 18th or early 19th century	A stone cottage with a tile roof, two storeys and two bays. In the ground floor is a doorway and a casement window to the left, and the upper floor contains two horizontally-sliding sash windows. In front of the cottage is a root store which is partly underground. It is in stone with a rectangular plan and has a doorway with a lintel. The store is covered with earth, and inside is a barrel vault.	II
12 Snailbeach; 52.61668°N 2.92064°W	—	Early 19th century	A lead worker's cottage in painted stone with a Welsh slate roof. There are two storeys and two bays. On the left is a timber porch, there is a brick lean-to on the right, and the windows are casements.	II
Aston Rogers Hall; 52.65145°N 2.97514°W	—	Early 19th century	A red brick farmhouse with a dentilled eaves cornice and a hipped slate roof. There are two storeys and six bays, the middle two bays projecting under a pediment containing a lunette. Flanking the middle two bays are flat-roofed porches with round-arches and impost bands on the sides. The windows are sashes, flat-headed in the middle two bays and round-headed elsewhere. Above the upper windows in the centre is a triangular emblem with a ship.	II
Brockton Bridge; 52.63380°N 3.00906°W		Early 19th century	The bridge carries the B4499 road over Brockton Brook. It is in limestone with the arches in red brick, and consists of two segmental arches. The bridge has a coped parapet, a flat string course, a cutwater, and rectangular corner piers.	II
Former candle house 52.61317°N 2.92231°W		Early 19th century	The former candle house is in stone with brick dressings, and has a Welsh slate roof. There is one storey, and it contains a central double door and small single-light windows.	II
Middle Walton Farmhouse; 52.64279°N 3.04811°W	—	Early 19th century	A red brick farmhouse with a dentilled eaves cornice, and a slate roof with coped verges. There are two storeys and an attic, and four bays. The doorway has a moulded surround and a bracketed flat hood, and the windows are sashes.	II
Milestone at NGR SO 32145 98454; 52.57966°N 3.00283°W		Early 19th century	The milestone is on the east side of the A488 road. It is in limestone, and has a rectangular section and a curved top. The inscription, which is almost illegible, indicates the distances to "SALOP" (Shrewsbury) and to Bishops Castle.	II
Milestone at NGR SO 3246 9695; 52.56631°N 2.99823°W		Early 19th century	The milestone is on the east side of the A488 road. It is in limestone, and has a rectangular section and a curved top. The inscription, which is partly illegible, indicates the distances to Church Stoke and to Bishops Castle.	II
Milestone at NGR SJ 3396 0102; 52.60255°N 2.97687°W		Early 19th century	The milestone is on the east side of the A488 road. It is in limestone, and has a rectangular section and a curved top. The top is inscribed "MINSTERLEY", and below are indicated distances to "SALOP" (Shrewsbury), Bishops Castle, and to Church Stoke.	II
Orchard Farmhouse; 52.64751°N 2.97853°W	—	Early 19th century	A red brick farmhouse with a dentilled eaves cornice and a slate roof. There are three storeys and three bays.. The central doorway has a segmental-headed fanlight, and the windows are segmental-headed casements.	II
Disused mill west of Pond House Farmhouse; 52.65248°N 2.97421°W	—	Early 19th century	The mill incorporates the timber framed gable end of a 17th-century former millhouse in its south gable end. The rest of the mill is in red brick and limestone, with a dentilled eaves cornice, and a tile roof. There are three levels, and the mill contains a doorway and other openings, all with segmental heads. At the north end is a massive cast iron overshot waterwheel with wooden spokes.	II
The Old White Horse; 52.63592°N 2.99499°W		Early 19th century	A house, at one time an inn, it is in red brick with wide eaves and a slate roof. There are three storeys, five bays, and a low projection to the left. The central doorway has pilasters, panelled reveals, a semicircular fanlight and an open pediment. The windows are sashes, the middle window in the middle floor is blind, and in the top floor the windows are blind and painted. The projection, a former shop, has one storey and an attic, two bays, a central doorway and small-paned windows.	II
The Chestnuts; 52.63337°N 3.00947°W	—	c. 1830	The remodelling of an earlier house, it is in red brick with a dentilled eaves cornice and a slate roof. There are two storeys and attics, and an L-shaped plan, the north range containing earlier fabric. There are two doorways, one with a segmental head, the other with a rectangular fanlight, and both under a lean-to verandah between the ranges. Most of the windows are casements, and inside the north range are timber framed walls.	II
Baptist chapel and cottage 52.61290°N 2.91651°W		1833	The chapel, which was rebuilt in 1873, and the cottage, which originated as a manse, are stuccoed with tile roofs. The entrance front of the chapel has a gabled porch flanked by round headed windows. There is another similar window above, and two at the rear. The cottage has one storey and an attic, a dentilled eaves cornice, and two bays. The doorway has a bracketed lean-to hood, the windows are sashes, and there are two gabled half-dormers.	II
All Saints Church, Shelve; 52.58503°N 2.98072°W		1839–40	The east window was added in about 1897. The church is built in limestone with a tile roof, and consists of a nave and a chancel in one cell, and a thin west tower. The tower has three stages, a west doorway with a segmental head, windows and bell openings with segmental heads, a corbel table, and a coped parapet. The windows along the sides of the church are lancets, and the east window has three lights.	II
Holy Trinity Church, Hope; 52.60718°N 2.97470°W		1842–43	The church was designed by Edward Haycock, and is built in limestone with a tile roof. It consists of a nave, a south porch, and a short narrower chancel with a north vestry. At the west end is a bellcote with twin pointed bell openings. The windows are lancets with hood moulds.	II
Blacksmith's shop and outbuilding 52.61366°N 2.92558°W	—	Mid 19th century	The blacksmith's shop is in red brick with limestone gable ends and a corrugated iron roof. There is one storey and the entrance is through double doors. The outbuilding to the south is in limestone with red brick dressings, it has a square plan, and is without a roof.	II
Chimney at N.G.R. SJ 3744 0197; 52.61190°N 2.92545°W		Mid 19th century	The chimney is in engineering brick with a stone core, on a square limestone plinth and it has stone capping. The chimney has an octagonal shaft and tapers to the top, and on the plinth are round-headed arches.	II
Corner House; 52.63561°N 2.99515°W	—	Mid 19th century	The remodelling of an earlier timber framed house, it has a slate roof. There is one storey and an attic, and three bays. On the front is a gabled porch, the windows are casements, and there are gabled dormers.	II
Engine house at NGR SJ 3743 0205; 52.63561°N 2.99515°W		Mid 19th century	The engine house is in limestone with angle quoins and a slate roof. There is a rectangular plan, four levels, and it contains flat-headed openings with timber lintels.	II
Magazine; 52.61327°N 2.92245°W		Mid 19th century	The magazine is in limestone, and is without a roof. It has a square plan, double walls, and a single storey. There are blocked windows on the east and west sides.	II
Chapel Shaft Chimney; 52.61186°N 2.91502°W		c. 1860–70	The chimney is in reddish-brown brick on a chamfered plinth with stone capping. It has a square plan and tapers towards the top.	II
Engine house and chimney near Maison Bleu; 52.60800°N 2.93462°W	—	Mid to late 19th century	The engine house is in limestone with red brick dressings and a slate roof. It contains a doorway and casement windows. The chimney is in red brick with yellow brick dressings on a limestone base. It has a square plan, and contains a round-headed arch.	II
Pump, Mill House; 52.63507°N 3.00863°W	—	Mid to late 19th century	Th pump is in painted cast iron. It has a slightly bulbous fluted shaft with a formerly pointed dome finial, a decorated spout, and a curved handle.	II
Ore House; 52.61445°N 2.92441°W		Mid to late 19th century	The ore house is in limestone, with red brick used as dressings and for patching, and the roof is slated. There is one storey, on the front are double doors to the left and a smaller door to the right, and in the right gable end is a multi-paned casement window.	II
Chimney, Tankerville Mine; 52.58938°N 2.95385°W		Mid to late 19th century	The chimney is in red brick with yellow brick capping, and stands on a limestone plinth. It has an octagonal section and tapers towards the top.	II
Pump and basin, The Chestnuts; 52.63340°N 3.00926°W	—	Mid to late 19th century	The pump is in cast iron, and has a fluted cap with a pointed dome finial, a decorated spout and a curved handle. The basin is in stone and is rectangular with rounded corners.	II
Village pump 52.61170°N 2.98285°W	—	Mid to late 19th century	The pump is in cast iron, and has a plain shaft with a decorated spout, a fluted cap and a slightly curved handle. The basin is in stone and is rectangular.	II
Winding engine house 52.61198°N 2.92476°W		1872	The winding engine house is in limestone and shale. It has a rectangular plan with quoins, it is without a roof, and there is a square projection to the south.	II
Crusher house 52.61368°N 2.92462°W		1873	The crusher house is in limestone with brick dressings, and is without a roof. It has two storeys and a rectangular plan, and contains a circular opening on the north side. The chimney is in red and yellow brick on a stone base.	II
Remains of engine house at N.G.R. SO 3278 9922; 52.58666°N 2.99366°W		Late 19th century	The former engine house is in limestone with red brick dressings, and is without a roof. It has a rectangular plan, three levels, and contains the remains of a round-headed opening on the southeast side.	II
Remains of engine house at NGR SO3195097976; 52.57538°N 3.00554°W		Late 19th century	The former engine house is in limestone, it has a rectangular plan and is without a roof. There are three levels.	II
Remains of engine house, Gritt Farm; 52.57595°N 2.99409°W		Late 19th century	What remains of the engine house is in limestone, and it is without a roof. It has a rectangular plan, three levels of flat-headed openings on the west side, and two openings with red brick segmental heads in the north gable end.	II
Remains of Lead Smelting Flues; 52.62131°N 2.92671°W	—	Late 19th century	The lead smelting flues are in limestone with red brick dressings. The flues are round-headed, several are open, and one is tunnelled back. There is also a retaining wall and earthworks.	II
Former Lead Smelting Works; 52.62151°N 2.92664°W	—	Late 19th century	The former lead smelting works is in limestone with red brick dressings and a slate roof. There are two levels, and it contains various openings, including doorways and windows, some with segmental heads.	II
Remains of small chimney, Tankerville Mine; 52.58975°N 2.95376°W	—	Late 19th century	The remains are in limestone. They have a circular section and are about 5 metres (16 ft) high.	II
Remains of small engine house, Tankerville Mine; 52.58974°N 2.95366°W	—	Late 19th century	The remains are in limestone, they have a rectangular plan, and are without a roof. The maximum height of the walls is about 3 metres (9.8 ft).	II
Winding engine house 52.61347°N 2.92574°W	—	Late 19th century	The former winding engine house is in limestone, with dressings in red and engineering brick. It has a rectangular plan, there are two levels, and it is without a roof. The building contains flat-headed window openings, and there is an external staircase leading to a blocked doorway.	II
Remains of engine house, Tankerville Mine; 52.58925°N 2.95385°W		1876	The former engine house of the former lead mine is in limestone with red brick dressings, and the roof is missing. It has a rectangular plan, two levels and a basement, and contains round- and flat-headed openings.	II
Locomotive shed 52.61392°N 2.92536°W		c. 1877	The locomotive shed is in [limestone with red brick dressings, and has a double-span roof with two gables. There is a single storey, on the front are double wooden doors, and on the roof are two louvred air vents. Inside there are narrow gauge tracks and inspection pits.	II
Compressor House and chimney 52.61340°N 2.92490°W		1881	The compressor house is in limestone with red brick dressings, and has a rectangular plan. It is without a roof, and there are two levels. The building contains a doorway and round-arched windows, and on the right side is an external staircase with a cast iron balustrade. The chimney is in engineering brick on a stone base, it has a square section, and tapers to the top, which has dentilled capping.	II
Worthen War Memorial; 52.63580°N 2.99507°W	—	1920	The war memorial is in Darley Dale stone, and consists of a simple Latin cross with a carved foot on a tall plinth with a moulded top, on a base of three square steps. On the plinth are brass plaques with inscriptions and the names of those lost in the two World Wars. In front of the memorial are painted iron railings and a gate.	II
