= Snailbeach Countryside Site =

Archaeological site in Shropshire, England

Coordinates: 52.614°N 2.925°W

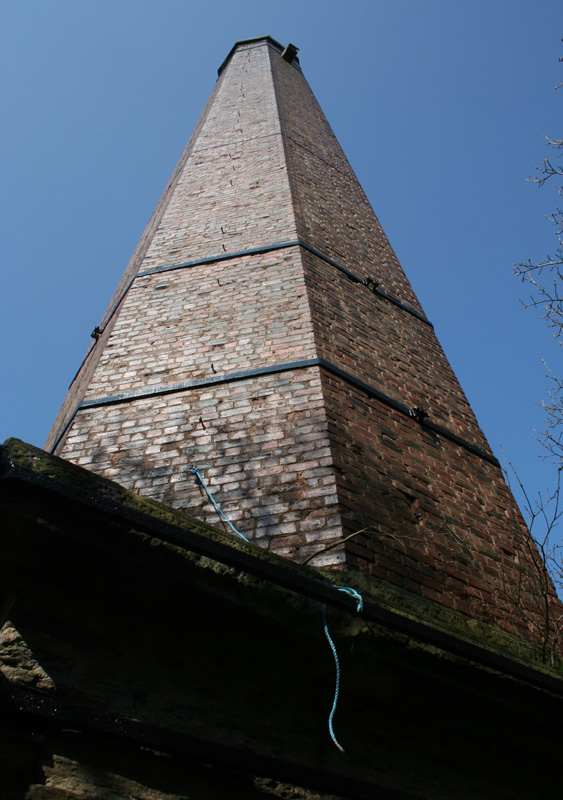
Mine Chimney on Resting Hill at Snailbeach Countryside Site

Snailbeach Countryside Site is an industrial archeology site in Shropshire. It is located three 3 miles (4.8 km) south of the village of Pontesbury and around 12 miles (19 km) from the county town of Shrewsbury. At peak of production during the 19th century, it was reputed to be extracting the largest volume of lead per acre in Europe.

== History and importance ==
Once the biggest lead mines in the county of Shropshire, the site is conserved as a scheduled monument.

== Snailbeach new smeltmill ==
Lead mining may have taken place around Snailbeach since Roman times and, at peak of production in the 1840s and '50s, it is reputed to have extracted the largest volume of lead per acre in Europe. Mining ceased at the site in 1955. Barite, calcite, fluorspar, silver and zinc were also mined in smaller amounts. The remains of the 17th century Snailbeach new smeltmill are identified by Historic England as being of national importance as one of best preserved of the remaining sites where smelting was developed in the switch from wood to coal at the start of the Industrial Revolution. The smeltmill is on Historic England's Heritage at Risk Register due to its 'very bad' condition due to invasive vegetation.

=== Snailbeach Mining Disaster ===
On the morning of 6 March 1895, seven men died after the cable lowering their cage down the mine snapped, plunging them 252 yards (230 m) to the shaft floor. It was reported that such was the force of the impact, that the steel cage was reduced from over 7 feet (2.1 m) in height to just 18 inches (457 mm), however, a watch from one of the miners was found still ticking at the scene.

== Snailbeach Lead Mine Heritage Project ==
The council's outdoor recreation service and Shropshire Mines Trust manage and preserve the site and have been awarded a £20,000 management grant from English Heritage to restore the Black Tom mine shaft headgear and some of the buildings. Their plans include assembling a building to store a mining jigger that was removed for restoration more than a decade before. The project was expected to be complete by 2013.

There are restored mining buildings to explore in the site, including a locomotive shed, winding engine house, blacksmith's shop, compressor house and Cornish engine. A circular walk links them, but some areas may be restricted to protect residents’ privacy. Stiperstones nature reserve can be accessed from this site.
