= Hampton Hall, Worthen =

Country house in Worthen, Shropshire, England

Coordinates: 52.6439°N 3.0209°W

Hampton Hall is a country house in Worthen, Shropshire.

== History ==
It was built between 1681 and 1686 for Henry Powell, and parts of an earlier house may have been incorporated into the left wing. It was altered in 1749 for Edward Herbert, with the addition of a prominent two-storey bow to the far left, and was extended in 1938. It became a Grade II* listed building in 1951.

== Architectural details ==
Built of red brick with slate roofs, the main central part of the house is rectangular with projecting wings to either side. The central part has three storeys and a semi-basement, with a brick parapet concealing the roof, and crow-stepped gables. The flanking wings have two storeys and a semi-basement and hipped roofs with dormer windows. The main stairs occupy a projection to the rear with another crow-stepped gable.

The house is in red brick with slate roofs, and consists of a central block, flanking projecting wings, and a recessed extension to the rear on the left. The central block has two storeys, an attic and a basement, and seven bays. Twelve steps lead up to a central sandstone porch that has round-headed arches on three sides and a shaped pediment broken by a coat of arms. The windows in the ground floor are sashes, in the upper floor are three central rectangular panels, flanked by two circular windows on each side, some of which are blind, and at the top is a parapet and crow-stepped gable ends. Both wings have two storeys over a semi-basement, two bays, and hipped roof, and most windows are sashes. The right wing contains a two-storey sandstone bow with a parapet surmounted by a stone eagle with outstretched wings. In the ground floor is a doorway with a triangular pediment, above is a curved Venetian window with Ionic capitals.

== See also ==
- Listed buildings in Worthen with Shelve
