= Mary Anne Talbot =

British sailor (1778–1808)

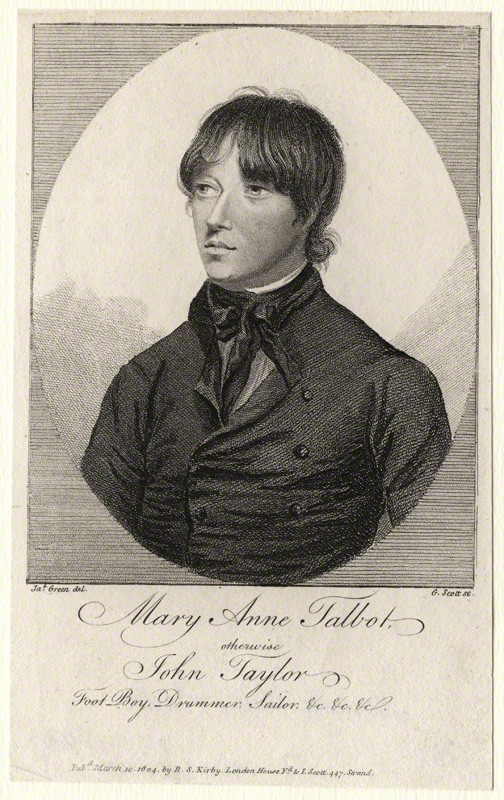
An 1804 engraving of Mary Anne Talbot

Mary Anne Talbot also known as John Taylor and as the "British Amazon" (2 February 1778 – 4 February 1808) was an Englishwoman who wore male dress and became a soldier and sailor during the French Revolutionary Wars.

== Life ==
Mary Anne Talbot was born in London at 62 Lincoln's Inn Fields. Later she claimed that she was one of the sixteen illegitimate children of Lord William Talbot, Baron of Hensol. Her mother died in childbirth when she was four. She spent her childhood in the care of different guardians, living with a wet nurse at Worthen, Shropshire from after her birth until the age of five, and then attended a girls' boarding school in Chester until age fourteen. She fell in the hands of a man she called Mr. Sucker (also known as Shuker), who was also in charge of her inheritance from her sister.

In 1792 Talbot ended up as a mistress of Captain Essex Bowen, who enlisted her as his footboy under the name "John Taylor" for a voyage to Santo Domingo. The regiment, the 82nd of Foot, were diverted for service in Flanders against the French and she served as a drummer-boy in the battle for Valenciennes, where Captain Bowen was killed. She was also wounded by a sabre slash and treated the wound herself. From Bowen's letters Talbot found out that Sucker had squandered what was left of her inheritance. She decided to go on working as a male sailor.

She deserted, fleeing through Luxembourg into the German Rhineland and became a cabin boy for a French ship. When the British Royal Navy captured the ship she was transferred to the Brunswick where she served as a powder monkey.

Talbot was wounded for the second time on 1 June 1794 during the battle against the French fleet off Ushant when grapeshot almost severed her leg. She never recovered the full use of it but later rejoined the crew. Later the French captured her and she spent the following 18 months in a Dunkirk dungeon. She managed to return to London in 1796. She subsequently signed on as a clerk aboard an American merchantman as a passage to the United States but she returned again to England to avoid the attentions of the skipper's niece who wanted to marry her, ignorant of Talbot's gender.

In 1797 she was seized by a press-gang and was forced to reveal her gender.

She went to the Navy to get the money due to her because of her service and wounds and finally found a sympathetic magistrate. At the same time her leg wound worsened and she continued to wear male clothing. She also visited Mr. Sucker who told her that all her inheritance was lost. Sucker apparently died of a heart attack three days later.

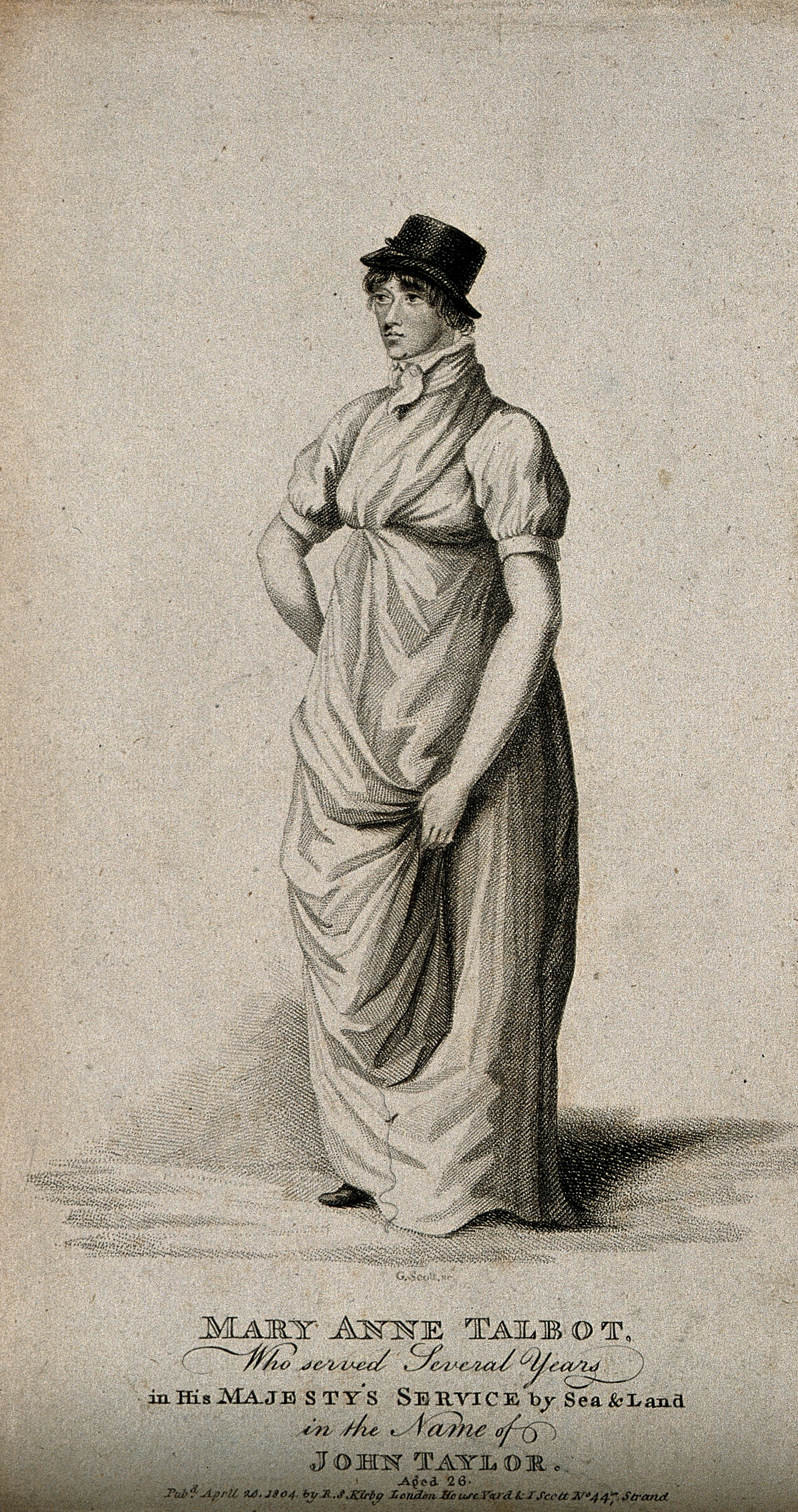
An 1804 intaglio print depicting Talbot

Talbot continued to use sailor's clothes, worked in menial jobs and even tried her luck on stage at Drury Lane but eventually was arrested and taken to debtor's prison at Newgate. When she was released she became a household servant for publisher Robert S. Kirby at his home in St Paul's Churchyard, London and worked for him for three years until her health deteriorated. She went to live with friends in Shropshire and died a few weeks later aged 30, on 4 February 1808.

Talbot has been identified with the "Anna Maria Talbot, d[aughter] of Tho[mas] Weaver - [of] Worthin - aged 30"(sic) who was recorded in the parish register of Worthen as buried there on 7 February 1808.

Kirby included her tale in his book Wonderful Museum, and (following her death) in The Life and Surprising Adventures of Mary Anne Talbot (1809). Talbot's tale aroused some sympathy and even a case of imposture when a woman in a Light Horseman's uniform tried to use a name John Taylor to solicit money in London.

However, the truthfulness of Talbot's story has been thrown into doubt, due to the discrepancies of the tale of her supposed time at sea, recorded in her biography and published in 1804. Among these, there is no record of any seamen on board the ships she claimed to have served in with the name Taylor. The unlikeliness of several of her accounts is also shown with her claim to have been on the Vesuvius as a midshipman when it was captured by the French on the English Channel. The ship in question was, at the time of the alleged capture, serving in the West Indies.

== Sources ==
- Chisholm, Hugh, ed. (1911). "Talbot, Mary Anne" . Encyclopædia Britannica. Vol. 26 (11th ed.). Cambridge University Press. p. 368.
- Seccombe, Thomas (1898). "Talbot, Mary Anne" . In Lee, Sidney (ed.). Dictionary of National Biography. Vol. 55. London: Smith, Elder & Co.
- Wheelwright, Julie. "Talbot, Mary Anne [John Taylor] (1778–1808)". Oxford Dictionary of National Biography (online ed.). Oxford University Press. doi:10.1093/ref:odnb/26935. (Subscription, Wikipedia Library access or UK public library membership required.)
