= Listed buildings in Minsterley =

Minsterley is a civil parish in Shropshire, England. It contains 24 listed buildings that are recorded in the National Heritage List for England. Of these, two are at Grade II*, the middle of the three grades, and the others are at Grade II, the lowest grade. The parish contains the village of Minsterley and the surrounding countryside. Most of the listed buildings are houses, cottages, farmhouses and farm buildings, almost all those dating before the end of the 17th century being timber framed. The other listed buildings are a church, a group of tombs in the churchyard, a former toll house, a former watermill, a former malthouse, a milestone, a pump, a urinal, and a bridge.

== Key ==
| Grade | Criteria |
|---|---|
| II* | Particularly important buildings of more than special interest |
| II | Buildings of national importance and special interest |

== Buildings ==
| Name and location | Photograph | Date | Notes | Grade |
|---|---|---|---|---|
| Minsterley Hall; 52.63899°N 2.92737°W | — | c. 1581 | The house was greatly extended in 1653, and restored and altered in 1872. It is timber framed with plaster infill, some underbuilding in red brick with grey sandstone dressings, and has tile roofs. There are two storeys and an attic, and the house consists of a two-bay range, a two-bay cross-wing to the northeast, and a two-bay cross-wing to the southwest. It has three gables to the west and one gable and two dormers to the east. The upper floors are jettied with moulded bressumers, and the gables have bargeboards and finials. The windows vary; some are mullioned and transomed, some are casements, and others are cross-windows. | II* |
| Green Farmhouse; 52.62917°N 2.93793°W | — | Early 17th century | The farmhouse was altered in the 19th century and extended in the 20th century. The original part is timber framed with brick nogging, it is clad in galvanised metal sheet at the rear, the refacing, rebuilding and extension are in brick, and the roof is slated. There are two storeys and an attic, a hall range of one or two bays, a projecting gabled cross-wing of two bays, and a lean-to. The windows are casements. | II |
| Lower Cottages; 52.63978°N 2.92836°W | — | Early 17th century (probable) | A house, later divided into two, it was remodelled and probably extended in the 19th century. The house is basically timber framed, refaced and extended in stone with red brick dressings, pebbledashed to the left, the right gable end is in red brick, and the roof is tiled. There is one storey and an attic, and two bays with an extension at each end. The windows are casements, and there are two gabled eaves dormers. | II |
| Hogstow Mill; 52.62252°N 2.93839°W | — | Early to mid 17th century | A farmhouse, later a private house, it was later altered and extended. The original part is timber framed with brick nogging, the rebuilding and extensions are in stone and brick, and the roof is tiled. It has a T-shaped plan, with two bays, an extension to the west, and a north wing. The original part has one storey and an attic, and the extension has two storeys and an attic. The windows are casements, there is a bracketed porch, and two gabled dormers. | II |
| Brook House; 52.63874°N 2.92554°W | — | Mid 17th century | A farmhouse, later a private house and divided, it is timber framed with brick and plaster infill, on a plinth of stone and brick, and with a tile roof. There is one storey and an attic, and an L-shaped plan, with a two-range and a one-bay cross-wing, and a lean-to at the rear with a slate roof. The windows are casements, and there is a gabled porch. | II |
| Barn and pigsties near Hogstow Mill; 52.62265°N 2.93861°W | — | Mid 17th century | The barn is the earliest and was later altered and extended. It is timber framed with brick nogging on a stone plinth, with extensions in red brick and a tile roof. There are three bays, and an extension at each end, and it contains doors, vents, and loft doors. The pigsties date from the 19th century, and are in stone with red brick dressings and a tile roof, and contain three segmental-headed entrances. | II |
| Wood Farmhouse; 52.62417°N 2.93301°W | — | Mid 17th century | The farmhouse was partly refaced or rebuilt in the 19th century. It is timber framed with plaster infill on a sandstone plinth, refaced or rebuilt in rendered brick, and has a tile roof. There is one storey and an attic, and four bays. The farmhouse has a lean-to porch, casement windows, and two flat-topped eaves dormers. | II |
| Hall Farmhouse and Brookland; 52.63833°N 2.92622°W | — | Mid to late 17th century | The farmhouse was altered and extended in the 19th century, and has been divided into two dwellings. It is timber framed with brick nogging on a brick plinth, clad in galvanised metal sheet at the rear, refaced or rebuilt in red brick on a stone plinth with some applied timber framing, and has tile roofs. It has two storeys, and consists of a hall range of three bays, a projecting gabled cross-wing of two bays, and a parallel 19th-century cross-wing. There are two lean-to porches, and the windows are casements. | II |
| The Cobblestones; 52.63941°N 2.92515°W | — | Mid to late 17th century | A timber framed house with brick infill, partly rendered, partly rebuilt in brick at the rear, and with a tile roof. There is one storey with an attic, four bays, and a lean-to at the rear. The windows are casements, and there are three gabled eaves dormers on the front and one at the rear. | II |
| Barn, Upper House Farm; 52.63937°N 2.92889°W | — | Mid to late 17th century | The barn is timber framed with weatherboarding, and has a tile roof. There are four bays, and the barn contains doorways and loft doors. | II |
| Barn south of Brook House; 52.63860°N 2.92539°W | — | Late 17th century | The barn is timber framed with weatherboarding on a plinth of stone and brick, and has a tile roof. There is one story and a loft, and two bays, and it contains doors and a window. | II |
| Oakfields; 52.62218°N 2.93984°W | — | Late 17th century | The cottage was altered in the 18th century and extended in the 20th century. It is timber framed with brick and plaster infill, on a stone plinth, the end walls are in sandstone, the east wall is rendered, and the roof is in corrugated iron. There is one storey and an attic, two bays, a further two bays to the east, and a single-storey brick extension to the left. The windows are casements, there is a brick porch, and a raking eaves dormer. | II |
| The Callow; 52.63969°N 2.92407°W | — | Late 17th century | The cottage was later altered and extended. It is timber framed with brick nogging, it has a sandstone end wall, refacing and rebuilding in brick, and the roof is in asbestos slate. There is one storey and an attic, and the extension has two storeys. The windows are casements, there is a gabled half-dormer with scalloped bargeboards, and a lean-to porch. | II |
| Holy Trinity Church; 52.63970°N 2.92659°W | | 1688–89 | The church is built in red brick with sandstone dressings and a tile roof. It consists of a nave and chancel in one unit, and a south porch, and at the west end is a bellcote. The west front has rusticated pilasters carrying an open segmental pediment. Within this is a doorway with an elaborate surround, above which is a round-arched window also with an elaborate surround, and a clock face. Flanking these are rectangular windows. The bellcote has a shingled lower stage, the upper stage is louvred with balusters on the corners, and the cap has a frieze and a pedimented gable to each face, and a weathervane. Along the sides are round-arched windows with moulded architraves with impost blocks and keystones carved with angel's heads. | II* |
| Former toll house 52.63981°N 2.92813°W | | c. 1768 | The former toll house is in sandstone with red brick dressings, a dentil eaves cornice, and a slate roof, and is in Gothic style. There are two storeys and two bays. In the centre is a doorway. and the windows are casements, those in the ground floor with ogee heads, and in the upper floor with round-arched heads and Y-tracery. | II |
| Stables south of Hogstow Mill; 52.62220°N 2.93841°W | — | Late 18th or early 19th century (probable) | The stables are in sandstone with red brick dressings, a dentil eaves cornice, and a tile roof. They have one storey and a loft, and contain arched stable doors, arched windows, and loft doors. | II |
| Watermill near Hogstow Mill; 52.62222°N 2.93865°W | — | c. 1815 | The former watermill is in red brick and sandstone with red brick dressings, a dentil eaves cornice and slate roofs. It has an L-shaped plan, consisting of a two-storey block and a north wing with one storey and an attic. The doorways and casement windows have segmental heads, and at each end of the main block are wheel pits. | II |
| Acacia House; 52.63989°N 2.92767°W | — | Early 19th century | A brick house on a stone plinth with a hipped slate roof, two storeys, four bays, and a lower two-storey extension to the south. The doorway has reeded pilasters with paterae, a radial fanlight, and a bracketed open triangular pediment. Most of the windows are sashes, those in the ground floor with architraves and decorated with ceramic tiles, and those in the upper floor with cast iron window boxes. There is also a pair of French windows. | II |
| Group of four chest tombs 52.63962°N 2.92628°W | — | Early 19th century | The chest tombs are in the churchyard of Holy Trinity Church. They are in sandstone, they have differing designs, and are to the memory of people who died between 1803 and 1829. | II |
| The Malthouse Surgery; 52.64001°N 2.92793°W | — | Early 19th century (probable) | Originally a malthouse, later used for other purposes, it is in stone with red brick dressings, rendered to the south, with a corrugated iron roof, hipped to the south, and a polygonal south end. It has three storeys, and contains casement windows, doorways and a loading door. | II |
| Milestone; 52.61433°N 2.94201°W | — | Mid to late 19th century (probable) | The milestone is on the southeast side of the A488 road, and has a rounded top. It is inscribed with the name of the parish and the distance in miles to "SALOP" (Shrewsbury). | II |
| Pump near Brook House; 52.63869°N 2.92541°W | — | Mid to late 19th century | The pump is to the southeast of the house. It is in cast iron, and consists of a circular shaft with moulded rings, a fluted top, a splayed spout, a double-curved handle, and a fluted domed cap with a spike finial. | II |
| Urinal; 52.63947°N 2.92545°W | — | Late 19th century (probable) | The urinal is in cast iron panels, and has two stalls with a central divider. There are circular corner shafts, panels with pierced geometrical patterns, and a moulded top rail with cresting and central dog figure at the front. | II |
| Minsterley Bridge; 52.63972°N 2.92579°W | — | 1909 | The bridge carries the B4387 road over a tributary of the Rea Brook. It is in reinforced concrete, and consists of a single segmental arch. The bridge has panelled spandrels, chamfered string courses, parapets with rounded coping, and rectangular panelled piers with pyramidal caps. | II |
