= Minsterley Brook =

Stream in Shropshire, England

Minsterley Brook is a small stream in Shropshire, England.

The source of this stream is at the northeast part of Stapeley Hill (the site of the stone circle, Mitchell's Fold). It is later on joined by other smaller streams flowing into it. It is a steep rocky brook, fast flowing with occasional small water falls. The brook passes down the steep wooded Hope Valley which houses a nature reserve before passing through Plox Green. The brook then descends less steeply down through the grounds of the 16th century Minsterley Hall past Minsterley's Parish Hall. After this it joins the larger river called the Rea Brook.
