= Worthen =

Village in Shropshire, England

Coordinates: 52.636°N 2.994°W

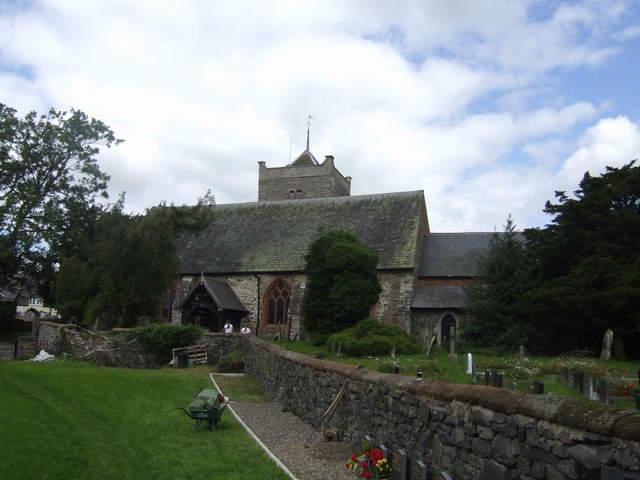
- Worthen Church

- Location within Shropshire
- Population: 2,078 (2011)
- OS grid reference: SJ327047
- Civil parish: Worthen with Shelve
- Unitary authority: Shropshire
- Ceremonial county: Shropshire
- Region: West Midlands
- Country: England
- Sovereign state: United Kingdom
- Post town: SHREWSBURY
- Postcode district: SY5
- Dialling code: 01743
- Police: West Mercia
- Fire: Shropshire
- Ambulance: West Midlands
- UK Parliament: South Shropshire

Worthen is a village and former civil parish, now in the parish of Worthen with Shelve, in the Shropshire district, in the ceremonial county of Shropshire, England. It is approximately 13 miles west of Shrewsbury. It sits in the Rea Brook valley. To the south are the Stiperstones and the Bromlow Callow, known for the small clump of trees on top. To the north is Long Mountain.

On 1 April 1987 the parishes of Worthen and Shelve were abolished to form the parish of Worthen with Shelve. The parish includes the hamlets and villages of Brockton, Little Worthen, Pennerley, and Snailbeach, in addition to its namesakes and several smaller settlements. It has an area of 6,895.55 hectares (26.6239 sq mi), and in the 2011 United Kingdom census the population of the parish was 2,078 in 877 household spaces.

Worthen contains the grade I listed Church of England parish church, All Saints, a functioning Methodist Chapel, a primary school (now called Long Mountain School) with Eco-School status, a village hall built in 1977 and a post office housed within the local shop. Hampton Hall, a grade II* listed country house, is nearby.

== History ==
=== Population ===
The population of Worthen has fluctuated throughout history since the first census was taken in 1801 recording the population at 1,799. A slight decrease followed in 1811 before a steady increase to the peak of the population in 1881 at 3,029. A slight decrease followed this until 1851 when a small increase occurred bringing the population to 1,965. In 1961 the parish had a population of 1,760. According to the 2001 census the population of "Worthen with Shelve" parish was 1,929 with a total of 775 households in the parish, the population increasing to 2,078 at the 2011 Census.

=== Employment ===
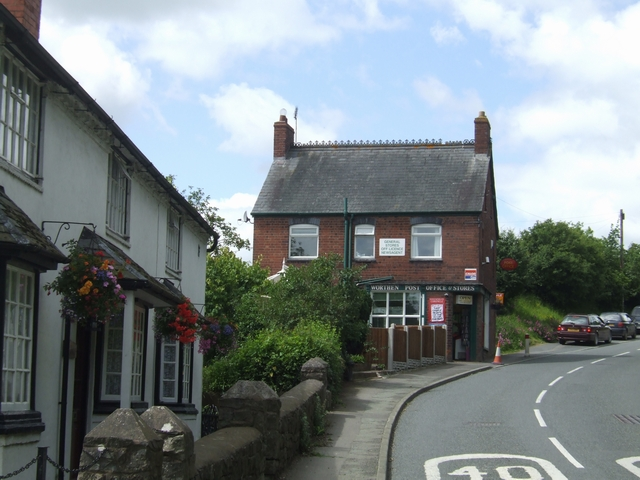
Worthen post office

Worthen's population was predominantly characterised by labourers as recorded in the 1831 census, which showed a more organised classification of occupation, during this year there were 393 recorded labourers and servants employed in agricultural and non-agricultural sectors. A more detailed census was taken in 1881, which showed a greater working population of 437 male workers in mineral substances and 240 male workers in agriculture. Mining was a major employment sector and well known mines included Snailbeach, a lead-ore mine, Perkins’ Beach lead mine and additionally grit and gravel mines.

=== Folklore ===
A local folktale tells of a family named Reynolds, who were driven out of their farm by two bogies who had the appearance of an old man and woman. When they left, the bogies managed to follow them to their new home by hiding inside a salt cellar.

== Notable people ==
- Henry Stafford, 1st Baron Stafford, died at nearby Caus Castle, buried at Worthen church 1563.
- Frances King (philanthropist), lived at Worthen when her husband Richard King was rector there between 1782-1810.
- Mary Anne Talbot, female soldier/sailor, lived at Worthen as child, also buried at Worthen 1808.
- Lois Baxter, actress, brought up at Worthen while father was local doctor.
- Peter Wall, professional footballer, buried at Worthen church 2024.

== See also ==
- Listed buildings in Worthen with Shelve
