= Snailbeach =

Village in Shropshire, England

Coordinates: 52.616°N 2.924°W

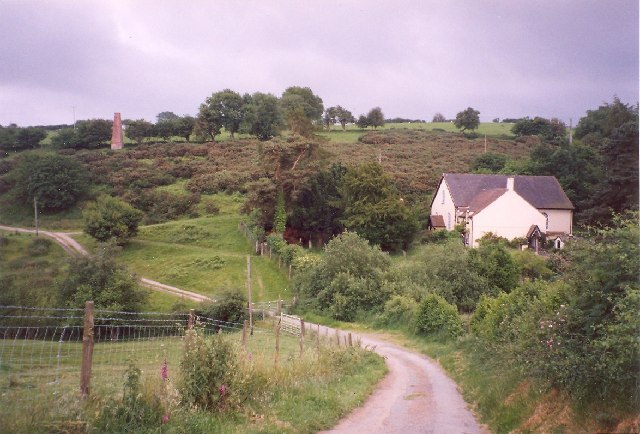
- Lords Hill Baptist Chapel and cottage, Snailbeach

- Location within Shropshire
- OS grid reference: SJ375025
- Civil parish: Worthen with Shelve
- Unitary authority: Shropshire
- Ceremonial county: Shropshire
- Region: West Midlands
- Country: England
- Sovereign state: United Kingdom
- Post town: SHREWSBURY
- Postcode district: SY5
- Dialling code: 01743
- Police: West Mercia
- Fire: Shropshire
- Ambulance: West Midlands
- UK Parliament: Ludlow

Snailbeach is a village in Shropshire, England, located at grid reference SJ375025, three 3 miles (4.8 km) south of the village of Pontesbury and around 12 miles (19 km) from the county town of Shrewsbury. The population details taken at the 2011 census can be found under Worthen. The village was formerly home to a large lead mine.

== History ==
=== Early history ===
A village was built for workers at the local lead mine – Snailbeach Mine, which reputedly dates back to Roman times. The mine has some of the best-preserved surface buildings of a lead mine left standing in Britain including a Cornish Engine House. It is managed by the Shropshire Mines Trust. Snailbeach Mine was the biggest lead mine in Shropshire and it is reputed to have yielded the greatest volume of lead per acre of any mine in Europe. Although the miners mainly extracted lead ore (galena) from the mine, smaller quantities of barytes, calcite, fluorspar, silver and zinc were also obtained.

=== Late 20th century ===
Underground mining ceased in Snailbeach in 1955. Since 1955 only some reworking of the spoil heaps for spar, to use as pebble dash on buildings, has occurred. Barytes from here was sent to the Windscale nuclear reactor to smother fuel cells after an accident. Locals carried on working the tips until the 1970s. Although some ore is said to have been left standing in the mine, it does not seem likely that the mine will reopen. The old miners were very thorough in their working and rarely left much ore for later generations. Once a mine has been allowed to flood and the machinery removed the cost of reopening the mine increases dramatically and the prospect usually becomes too expensive. Any large amounts of lead remaining in the area are likely to be below the Ritton Castle area. Unfortunately miners would probably have to dig at least 1,000 feet down before they reach the top of the lead deposits, if they could find them. This is too deep and too expensive so lead mining in Shropshire is unlikely to become a major industry ever again.

The Shropshire County Council, using government grants, did extensive work in the early 1990s to make some of the shallow workings safe for the villagers. At the same time, they acquired many of the surface buildings and preserved these or restored them from a semi-derelict condition. The white spoil tip on the northern edge of the village, which had been a local landmark, was landscaped and planted with trees as part of the mining reclamation works.

== Lead mine site ==
The Shropshire Mines Trust manages the Snailbeach Countryside Site on behalf of Shropshire Council, which owns many of the mine buildings and much of the land and gives free access to visit the publicly-owned sites; guided tours can include such features otherwise not accessible.

== Village facilities ==
Snailbeach contains a Church of England church, St Luke's, a Methodist Chapel and cemetery, and, a village hall. The latter contains a circular war memorial tablet to the local men who died serving in the Second World War.

== See also ==
- Snailbeach Countryside Site
- Snailbeach District Railways
- Minsterley, Stiperstones
- Listed buildings in Worthen with Shelve
