= Middletown, Powys =

Hamlet in Powys, Wales

Coordinates: 52.70479965°N 3.03355911°W

Middletown: Welsh: Treberfedd
- Hamlet
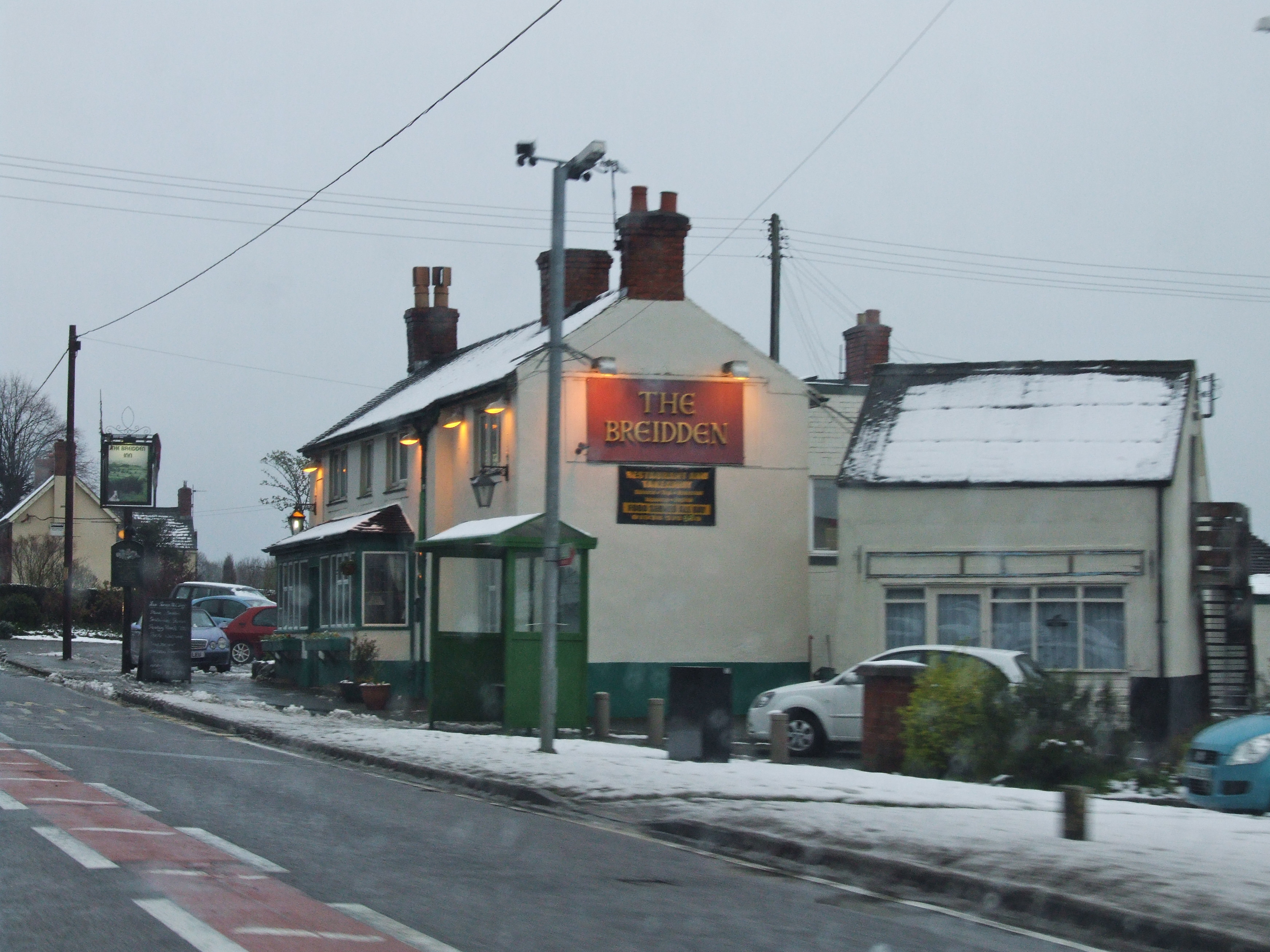
- The Breidden, pub in Middletown.

- Location within Powys
- OS grid reference: SJ30261240
- Principal area: Powys
- Preserved county: Powys
- Country: Wales
- Sovereign state: United Kingdom
- Post town: WELSHPOOL
- Postcode district: SY21
- Dialling code: 01938
- Police: Dyfed-Powys
- Fire: Mid and West Wales
- Ambulance: Welsh
- UK Parliament: Montgomeryshire and Glyndŵr
- Senedd Cymru – Welsh Parliament: Montgomeryshire

Middletown (Welsh: Treberfedd) is a hamlet in Powys, Wales near the border with England. It is situated on the A458 road, between the towns of Shrewsbury and Welshpool. The X75 Bus Route through the village runs to these towns. The Afon Pwll Bychan passes through the village. Middletown has many local sites, including Cefn y Castell and Breidden Hill. The nearest town to Middletown is Welshpool, which is 5 miles away.

Middletown is represented in the Senedd by Russell George (Conservative) and the UK Member of Parliament is Steve Witherden.

Until 1987 Middletown was a community.
