= Minsterley =

Village in Shropshire, England

Coordinates: 52°38′22″N 2°55′22″W

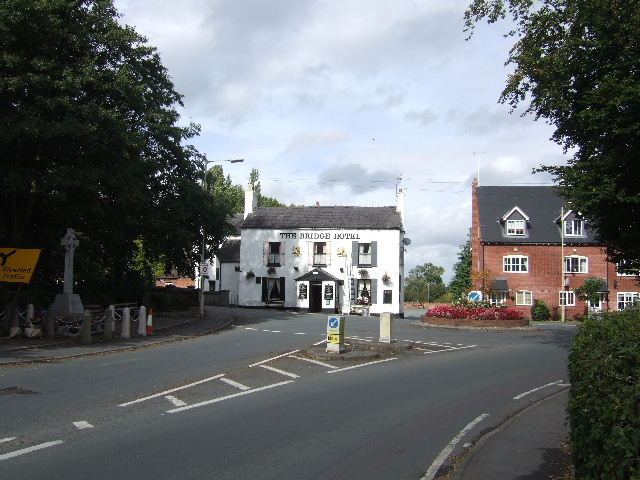
- The Bridge Hotel in 2007 (now closed)

- Location within Shropshire
- Population: 1,777
- OS grid reference: SJ374050
- Civil parish: Minsterley
- Unitary authority: Shropshire
- Ceremonial county: Shropshire
- Region: West Midlands
- Country: England
- Sovereign state: United Kingdom
- Post town: SHREWSBURY
- Postcode district: SY5
- Dialling code: 01743
- Police: West Mercia
- Fire: Shropshire
- Ambulance: West Midlands
- UK Parliament: Shrewsbury

Minsterley is a village and civil parish in Shropshire, England. In the 2011 census, its population was 1,777. Minsterley lies one mile south-west of Pontesbury and 10 miles south-west of Shrewsbury. East from Minsterley along the A488, is the larger village of Pontesbury and to its south the hill range, the Stiperstones. The Rea Brook flows nearby and the smaller Minsterley Brook flows through the centre of the village.

Little Minsterley is a hamlet on the northeastern edge of the village, which was founded in 1901. Between it and the main village is located one of the Shropshire Fire and Rescue Service's retained fire stations.

== Governance ==
Until the 19th century, Minsterley was part of the parish of Westbury, hence its description under Westbury in John Marius Wilson's Imperial Gazetteer of England and Wales (1870–72) like this:

"WESTBURY,... parish includes Minsterley chapelry, and forms a sub-district. Acres, 11,274....The p[erpetual]. curacy of Minsterley is a separate benefice. There are dissenting chapels, an endowed school with £30 a year, and charities £44."

Minsterley civil parish is governed by a parish council separate from that of Westbury, is represented on the Shropshire Council and in parliament in the Shrewsbury constituency.

== Churches ==
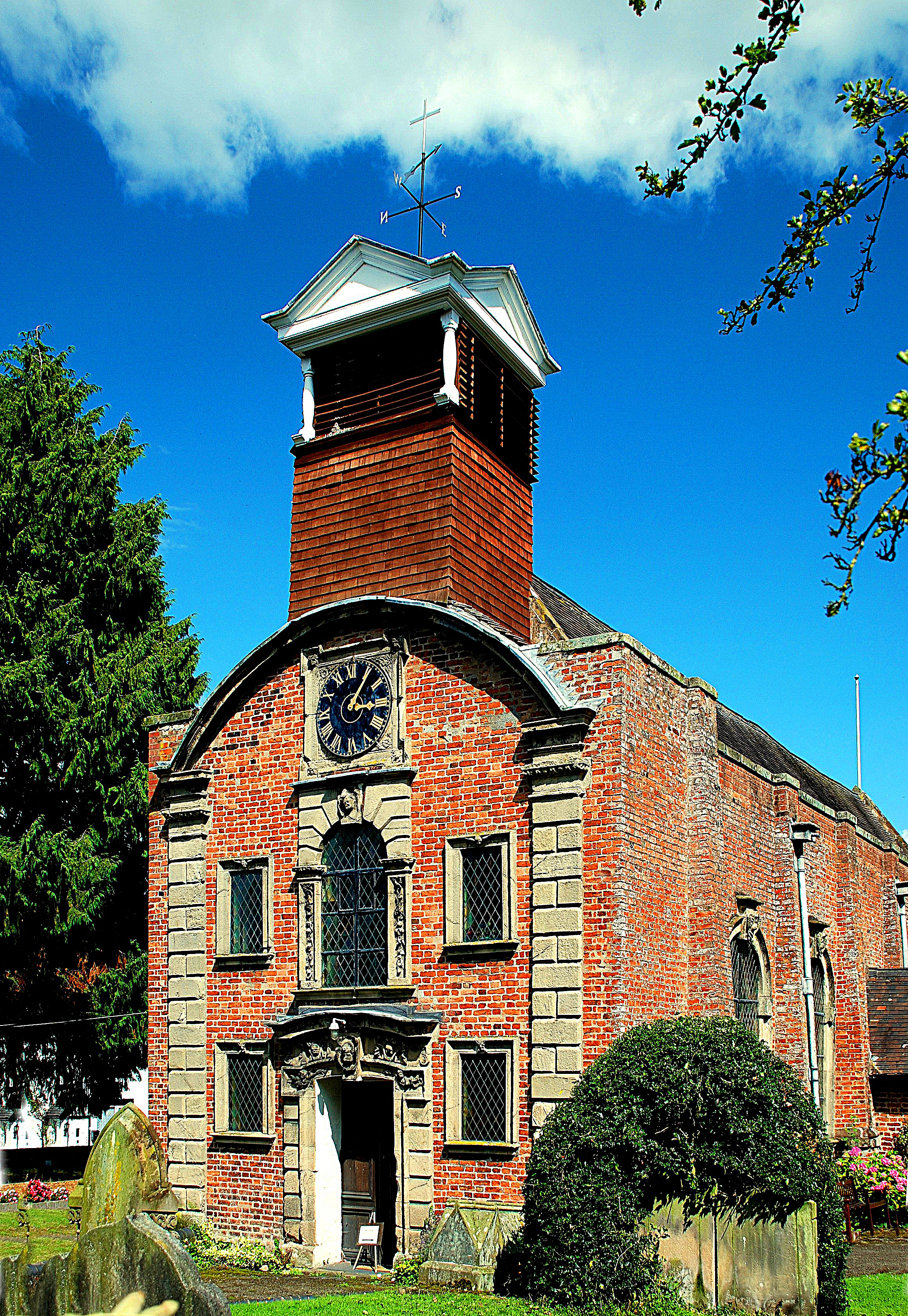
Minsterley church

The Church of England parish church of Holy Trinity was built at the end of the 17th century, by the Thynne family of Longleat and houses an internationally famous collection of maiden's garlands. The exterior of the west end of the Church is notable for the stonework memento mori, which include skull and crossbones and hourglasses. The churchyard contains war graves of a soldier of World War I and a soldier of World War II.

The village also has active Congregationalist and Methodist churches.

== Industry ==
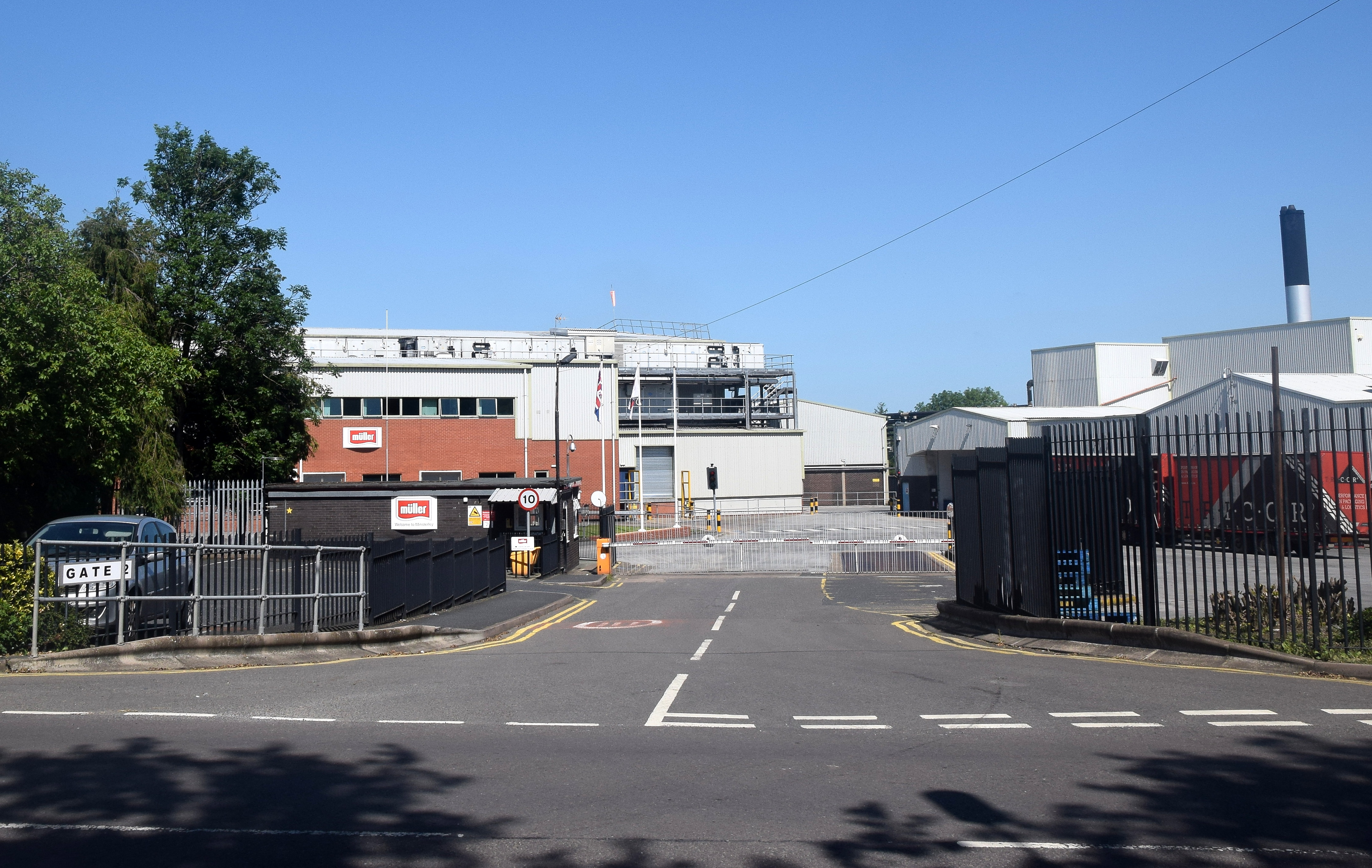
Dairy in July 2021

It is home to a large dairy, established in 1906, which came under Müller ownership in January 2013 (previously it was owned by Uniq Foods) and a meat canning factory, Rea Valley Foods part of Zwanenberg Food Group UK.

== Amenities and historic sites ==
Village amenities include: a primary school, a cemetery, a public house ('The Crown and Sceptre'- one of the oldest buildings in the village), a petrol station/supermarket (operated by Morrisons), post office, veterinary surgery, florist, and two fish and chip shops. The Parish Hall is one of the largest village halls in Shropshire and is the venue for the annual Minsterley Eisteddfod which held its 50th anniversary in 2012.

The area adjacent to the 'Crown and Sceptre' public house was where the annual Hiring Fair was held in the late 19th century. Young people, of work age, would be hired by local landowners for the year in return for an agreed sum of money to be paid at the following year's fair.

The parish war memorial, unveiled in 1920, stands in the centre of Minsterley beside the main road. It is in the form of a granite Celtic cross and said to be based on that of St. Ives, Cornwall. The list of World I dead is headed by Viscount Weymouth, eldest son of the 5th Marquess of Bath, whose family were lords of the manor and who was killed in France in 1916.

=== Minsterley Hall ===
Minsterley Hall, a Grade II* listed house built in 1581, lies on the edge of the village. Formerly the Shropshire seat of the Marquess of Bath, the house was greatly extended in 1653 for Sir Henry Frederick Thynne, and restored and altered in 1872 by John Thynne, 4th Marquess of Bath. It is timber framed with plaster infill, some underbuilding in red brick with grey sandstone dressings, and has tile roofs. There are two storeys and an attic, and the house consists of a two-bay range, a two-bay cross-wing to the northeast, and a two-bay cross-wing to the southwest. It has three gables to the west and one gable and two dormers to the east. The upper floors are jettied with moulded bressumers, and the gables have bargeboards and finials. The windows vary; some are mullioned and transomed, some are casements, and others are cross-windows. The master bedroom features an ornate Italian marble fireplace commissioned for the house by the 4th Marquess during his Grand Tour. The drawing room features a 15th Century screen thought to be taken from Caus Castle.

== Transport ==
The Minsterley branch line which was built as a joint GWR/LNWR line, opened on 14 February 1862. This railway line ran nine and a half miles from Shrewsbury via Cruckmeole Junction near Hanwood to the stations at Plealey Road, Pontesbury and finally the terminus at Minsterley. The creation of the line enabled milk to be transported by rail from the large creamery at Minsterley and lead ore to be transported from the nearby mines at Snailbeach. At one time the terminus in Minsterley boasted a milk wharf, goods shed, cattle and horse docks and numerous sidings. The line closed in May 1967.

== Notable residents ==
- Michael Hooper, ultimately Bishop of Ludlow, was vicar of Minsterley from 1970 to 1981.

== See also ==
- Listed buildings in Minsterley
- Minsterley Motors
