= Minsterley branch line =

Railway line in Shropshire, England

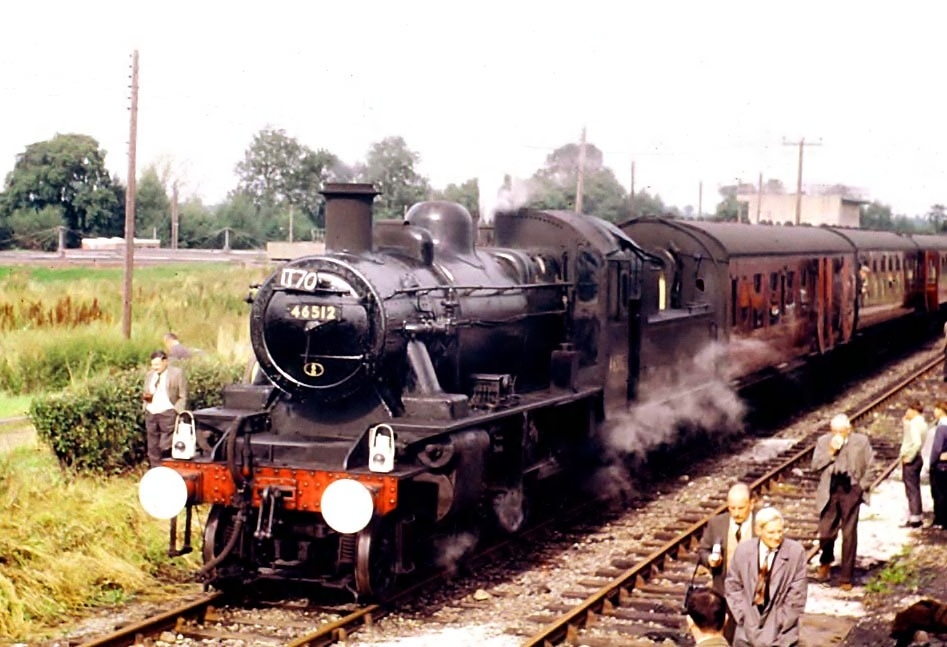
- A rail tour at Minsterley station 11 September 1965

Overview
- Owner: Great Western Railway; London and North Western Railway
- Locale: Shropshire
- Termini: Cruckmeole Junction 52°40′40″N 2°50′28″W; Minsterley railway station 52°38′27″N 2°55′27″W
- Stations: 3

History
- Opened: 1861
- Closed: 1967

Technical
- Line length: 6.5 mi (10.5 km)
- Number of tracks: 1
- Track gauge: 1,435 mm (4 ft 8 1/2 in) standard gauge

The Minsterley branch was a short railway line that ran from Cruckmeole Junction on the Cambrian Line just south of Shrewsbury to Minsterley in Shropshire. The six-and-a-half mile standard gauge line was the only section built of a plan to connect Shrewsbury with mid Wales. It was part of a joint venture between the Great Western Railway and London and North Western Railway companies.

== History ==
=== Plans ===
The route, which was conceived in the late 1850s, was planned to connect Shrewsbury via Hanwood on the Cambrian Line, with Pontesbury, Minsterley, Montgomery and Newtown. Services would also be able to continue to the Welsh coast. At Pontesbury station, transfer sidings connected the narrow gauge Snailbeach District Railway, which ran to lead mines at Snailbeach.

=== Opening ===
On 14 February 1861, the first section of line was opened from Cruckmeole Junction, on the Cambrian Line, to Minsterley. However, with the northerly section of the Cambrian main line into Wales opening the following year (connecting Newtown via Welshpool to Shrewsbury), it became apparent there was little need to continue beyond Minsterley. The station became the terminus of the truncated line.

=== Decline and closure ===
Passenger services ceased to Minsterley in 1951, although Hanwood station on the Cambrian Line remained open to passengers until 1960 and to goods until 1964. The branch line continued to carry goods (mainly for the Minsterley Creamery) until 1967 when the line was closed. The track was lifted after closure.

== Preservation ==
Much of the old trackbed has now been redeveloped though some rail infrastructure remains, such as bridge abutments. The Minsterley station site has been used as a meat processing factory. A large dairy-related factory also exists on either side of the old trackbed (just before the terminus) and the stationmaster's house has been converted to a private residence.
