= Shrewsbury and Welshpool Railway =

Railway in the United Kingdom

The Shrewsbury and Welshpool Railway (S&WR), formally named the Shrewsbury and Welchpool Railway, is a standard gauge railway which connects the towns of Shrewsbury and Welshpool. It opened in 1861 and the majority of the railway continues in use.

== History ==
=== Incorporation ===
Shrewsbury and Welchpool Railway Act 1856
- Act of Parliament
- Parliament of the United Kingdom
- Long title: An Act for making a Railway from the Oswestry and Newtown Railway in the Parish of Buttington in the County of Montgomery to Shrewsbury, with a Branch thereout to Minsterley in the County of Salop, and for other Purposes.
- Citation: 19 & 20 Vict. c. cxxxii

Dates
- Royal assent: 29 July 1856

Text of statute as originally enacted

Shrewsbury and Welchpool Railway Act 1858
- Act of Parliament
- Parliament of the United Kingdom
- Long title: An Act for extending the Powers of the Shrewsbury and Welchpool Railway Company for purchasing Lands and completing their Railway; and for other Purposes.
- Citation: 21 & 22 Vict. c. cx

Dates
- Royal assent: 23 July 1858

Shrewsbury and Welchpool Railway Act 1860
- Act of Parliament
- Parliament of the United Kingdom
- Long title: An Act to enable the Shrewsbury and Welchpool Railway Company to complete and maintain Deviations in the Line and Levels of their Railway and to complete and maintain the same across certain Roads on a Level, and to raise a further Sum of Money; and for other Purposes.
- Citation: 23 & 24 Vict. c. xxv

Dates
- Royal assent: 15 May 1860

Text of statute as originally enacted

Shrewsbury and Welchpool Railway Act 1861
- Act of Parliament
- Parliament of the United Kingdom
- Long title: An Act to authorize the Shrewsbury and Welchpool Railway Company to widen their Minsterley Branch; and for other Purposes.
- Citation: 24 & 25 Vict. c. xiii

Dates
- Royal assent: 17 May 1861

Shrewsbury and Welchpool Railway (Capital) Act 1863
- Act of Parliament
- Parliament of the United Kingdom
- Long title: An Act to authorize the Shrewsbury and Welchpool Railway Company to raise a further Sum of Money; and for other Purposes.
- Citation: 26 & 27 Vict. c. xcvii

Dates
- Royal assent: 29 June 1863

Text of statute as originally enacted

Shrewsbury and Welchpool Railway (Transfer) Act 1864
- Act of Parliament
- Parliament of the United Kingdom
- Long title: An Act to authorize the Shrewsbury and Welchpool Railway Company to transfer or lease their Undertaking to the London and North-western Railway Company, or to the London and North-western and Great Western Railway Companies.
- Citation: 27 & 28 Vict. c. cxcvi

Dates
- Royal assent: 14 July 1864

Text of statute as originally enacted

The Shrewsbury and Welshpool Railway was incorporated by an act of Parliament, the Shrewsbury and Welchpool Railway Act 1856 (19 & 20 Vict. c. cxxxii). Although initially an independent company, the line was to be operated and maintained by the London and North Western Railway (LNWR).

=== Opening ===
Construction began in 1859, and by 1861 the line from Shrewsbury to Minsterley was completed, and opened on 14 February 1861. Construction of the main line to Welshpool was completed later in 1861 and officially opened on 27 January 1862.

=== Minsterley branch ===
The Minsterley branch served the agricultural communities of the area, but its main purpose was to carry lead from the mines along the Stiperstones hills. These mines were connected to the S&WR at Pontesbury by the 2 ft 4 in (711 mm) narrow gauge Snailbeach District Railways which opened in 1873 and closed in 1959. The Minsterley branch closed for passenger service in 1951 and for freight traffic in the mid 1960s.

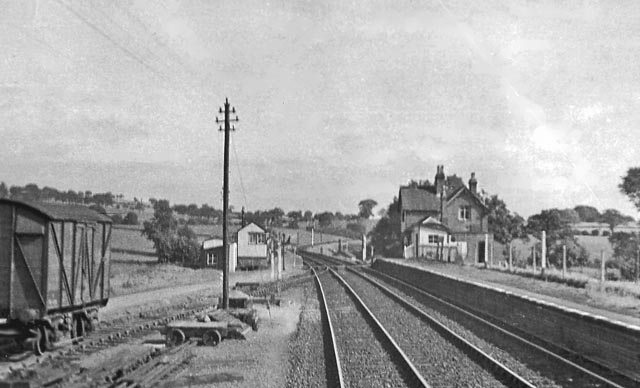
Breidden Station in 1953

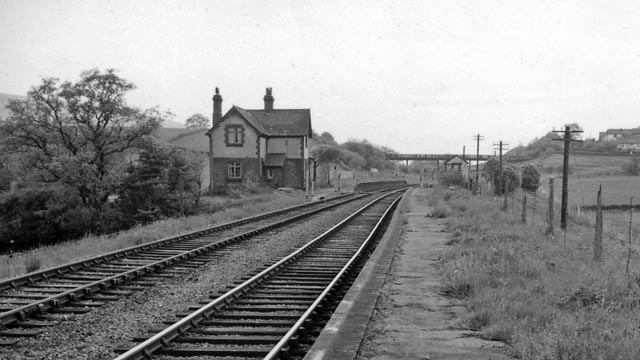
Breidden Station in 1962

=== Main line ===
The main line of the S&WR continued in use as the main route from Shrewsbury to Welshpool and, via the ex-Cambrian Railways main line, to mid-Wales and Machynlleth. The railway was jointly operated by the LNWR (LM&SR after 1923) and the Great Western Railway until nationalisation, when it became part of British Railways. All of the intermediate stations were subsequently closed in September 1960.
