= J W Poundley and D Walker =

Land surveyors' and architects' partnership

Poundley and Walker or John Wilkes Poundley and David Walker were a land surveyors and architects’ partnership with offices at Black Hall, Kerry, Montgomeryshire and at Unity Buildings, 22 Lord Street, Liverpool. The partnership was established probably in the mid-1850s and was dissolved in June 1867. The partnership was involved with large country estate building projects, church and civic buildings and some civil engineering. They specialized in building model farms. J. W. Poundley was also the county surveyor for Montgomeryshire from 1861–1872. The architect, canal and railway engineer, T. G. Newnham (sometimes incorrectly given as T. G. Newenham) appears have been associated with the partnership.

== John Wilkes Poundley (1807–1872) ==
Poundley was baptized at Montgomery, 27 April 1807. Following the death of his father, he was taken into the guardianship of William Pugh of Caerhowel and in 1827 he was apprenticed to the Oswestry architect Thomas Penson. He never qualified as an architect. In 1857 Poundley published Poundley's Cottage Architecture.

Poundley had close connections with Naylor family who, in 1835, had acquired the Brynllywarch estates at Kerry from William Pugh, the son of his guardian. They were also to acquire other estates at Leighton and Nantcribba. He was employed to undertake survey work of these acquisitions, now bound in two atlas volumes in the National Library of Wales. The Leighton Estate was purchased in 1847 and Poundley was employed on the construction of the monumental model farm from about 1849 to 1860. Apart from the farm itself, some of the more important structures are the Poultry House and the "cottage orneé", Poultry Cottage, the Cable House of the Railway and the massive stone built slurry tank, for the effluent from the farm.

About 1850, Poundley moved from Brook Cottage in Kerry to Black Hall. In the 1860s until the partnership with David Walker was dissolved, their output was prodigious and included considerable quantities of estate housing. The work extended to David Davies's Llandinam estate, the Abbeycwmhir estate in Radnorshire and model farms for the Earl of Cawdor in Carmarthenshire and Pembrokeshire. It is difficult to judge to what extent Poundley actually designed buildings, but the decorative bargeboards on cottage orneé buildings as at Glanmule seems to represent his work, as well as the use of red brick with rusticated stone quoining. Poundley was the main promoter of the Abermule to Kerry Railway, which had been authorized as part of the Oswestry and Newtown Railway Act 1855. This came into effect in May 1861 following the opening of Abermule Station. The construction of the railway and the building of Kerry Station at Glanmule appears to have been supervised by Poundley, opening on 2 May 1864. The railway amalgamated with others to form the Cambrian Railways in July 1864.

Poundley was also a sheep farmer and it was largely through his efforts the Kerry Sheep breed came to be recognized

=== Poundley’s Cottage Architecture 1857 ===
Title page of Poundley’s Cottage Architecture
Designs for Two Sets of Farm Steadings, and a double cottage for Labourers. mainly adapted to the High Districts of Wales.
with
Plans, Sections and Elevations.
by
J W Poundley, Kerry, Montgomeryshire.

For which a Society of Noblemen & Gentlemen connected with the Principality awarded their First PRIZES in March, 1855.
To which is added a Design for a Double Cottage of one story built with Iron and Flag accompanied by Specifications. Describing the Construction of the several Buildings and a detailed estimate of the Cost.
Dedicated by permission to the
Rt Hon Lord Bagot.

— Published by Lomax, Lichfield.
1857

This was produced for a group of Denbighshire Gentlemen under the sponsorship of Lord Bagot, of Pool Park near Denbigh and of Blithfield in Staffordshire. The double cottage design produced by Poundley is very plain and lacks the decorative features seen on his work for the Naylor's Montgomeryshire estates. Poundley states that he had built 25 of these cottages in the past year and the cost would have been £250 for a double cottage. The plans for the farm buildings for a 200-acre farm are similar to the farm buildings he erected for the Naylors at Leighton and Kerry, but on a smaller scale. The farm buildings would have cost £1000. For a farm of 100 acres the cost would have been £790. He also published plans for a simple double cottage of Bungalow form which would have cost £180 and the walls of which were supported on an iron framing.

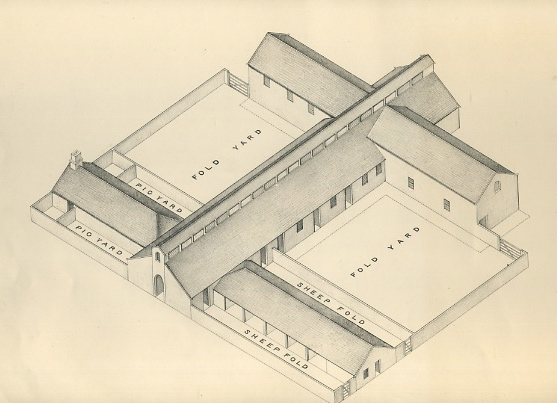
Poundleys Cottage Architecture . View of Farm Buildings

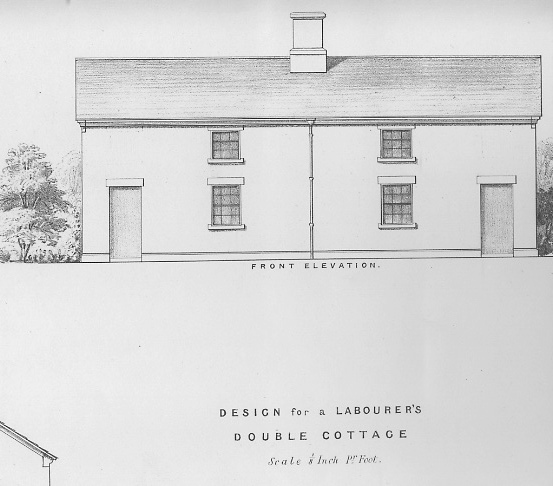
Double cottage

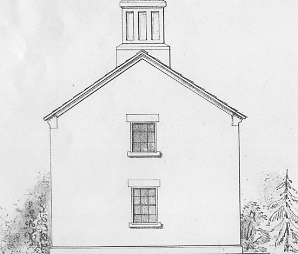
Poundleys Cottage Architecture . Side elevation of Labourers' cottages

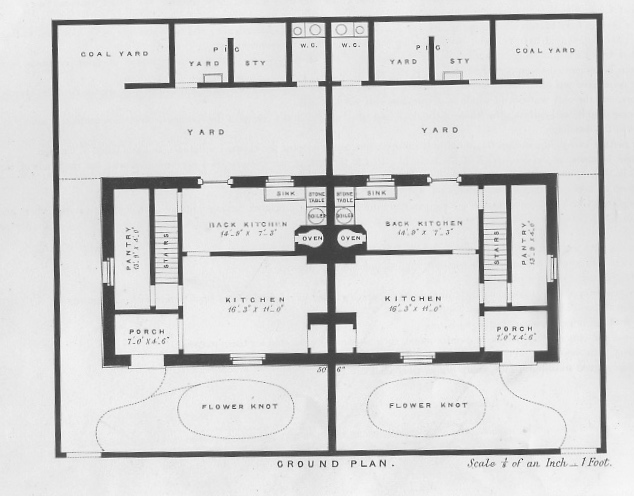
Poundleys Cottage Architecture. Plan of Labourers' double cottage.

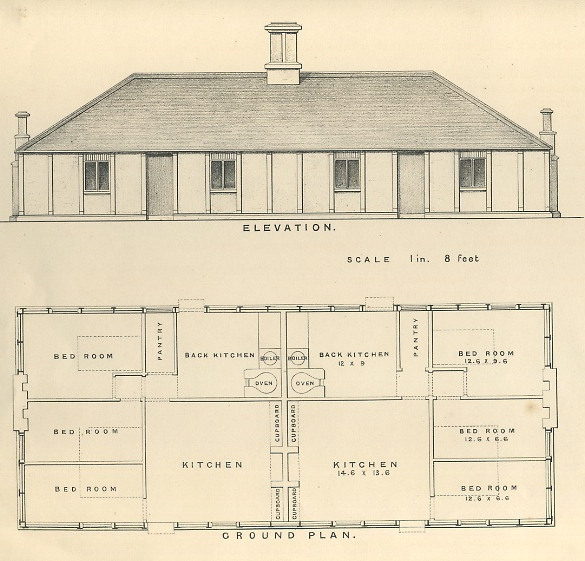
Poundleys Cottage Architecture . Labourers' bungalow

== David Walker (1840–1892) ==
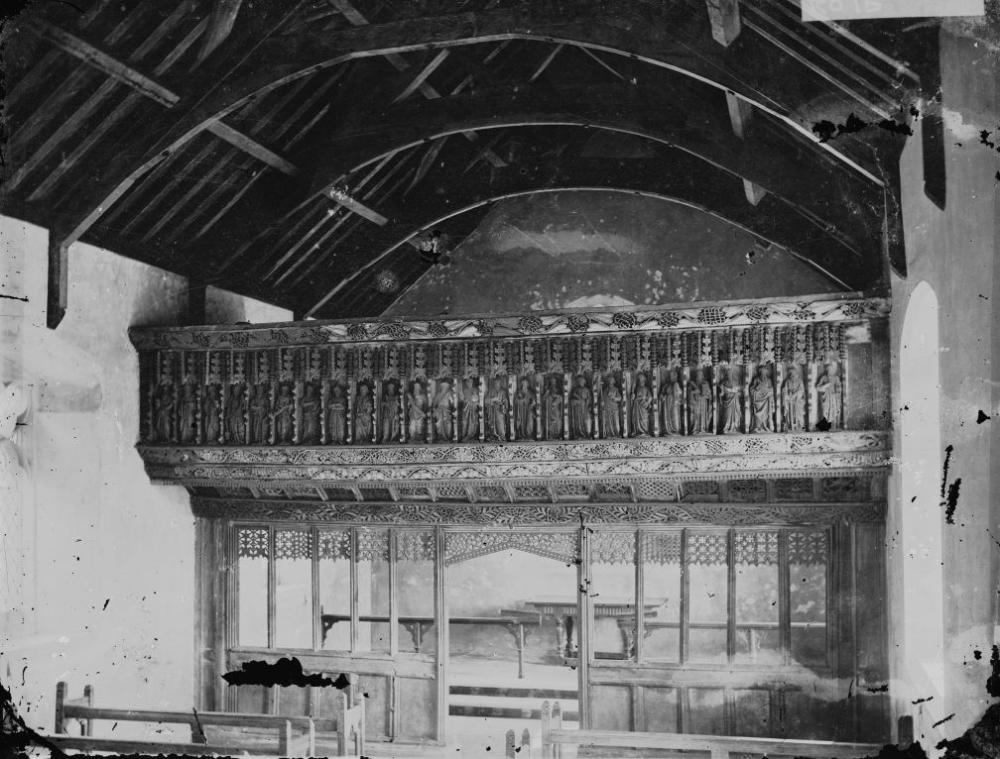
The medieval screen in the rebuilt St Anno's Church, Llananno

David Walker was a pupil of the architects William Hardy Hay and James Murdoch Hay in Liverpool. He was born in Birkenhead. He was practising at Unity Buildings Lord Street Liverpool in 1868 and had moved to Dale Street, Liverpool in 1881. He was still practising in 1890 and possibly up to his death, if he re-fronted the Bear Inn in Newtown in 1892. He particularly favoured whitish/yellow brick for his work and favoured rounded arched braced gables drawn from the writings of Eugène Viollet-le-Duc In later life, Walker appears to have specialised in Church architecture and developed an interest an interest in church wood, writing articles on church screens and rood lofts. He restored the screen at Llanwnnog in Montgomeryshire in 1873 and re-built in 1877-8 the church at Llananno in Radnorshire, to house the medieval screen.

== T G Newnham (1809/10–1898) ==
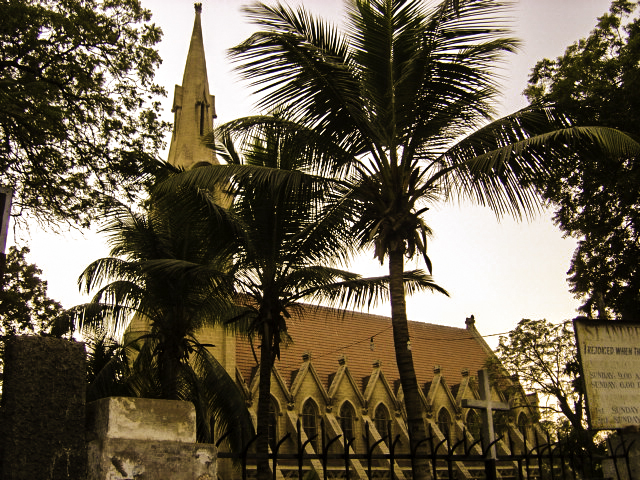
St. Andrews Church, Karachi

Thomas Garrett Newnham was the engineer to the Western Branch of the Montgomeryshire Canal in the 1830s and was a close associate of William Pugh, of Brynllywarch. In 1834 he was admitted as a member of the Institution of Civil Engineers and in 1836 he subscribed to Augustus Pugin’s Examples of Gothic Architecture, where he is described as an ‘Architect’ and his address is given as Newtown. He was involved in promoting an alternative route, on behalf of the now bankrupt William Pugh for the London to Holyhead Railway, in competition with Brunel and Stephenson. His model of Dolfor church was exhibited at The Great Exhibition of 1851. At about this time he left for India to become Chief Resident Engineer of the Sindh Railway and was responsible for St Andrew's Church, Karachi, which was completed in 1867. Later in the 1870s Newnham became deputy agent of Indus Flotilla, a steamship company

== Works by Poundley and Walker ==
=== Public Buildings ===
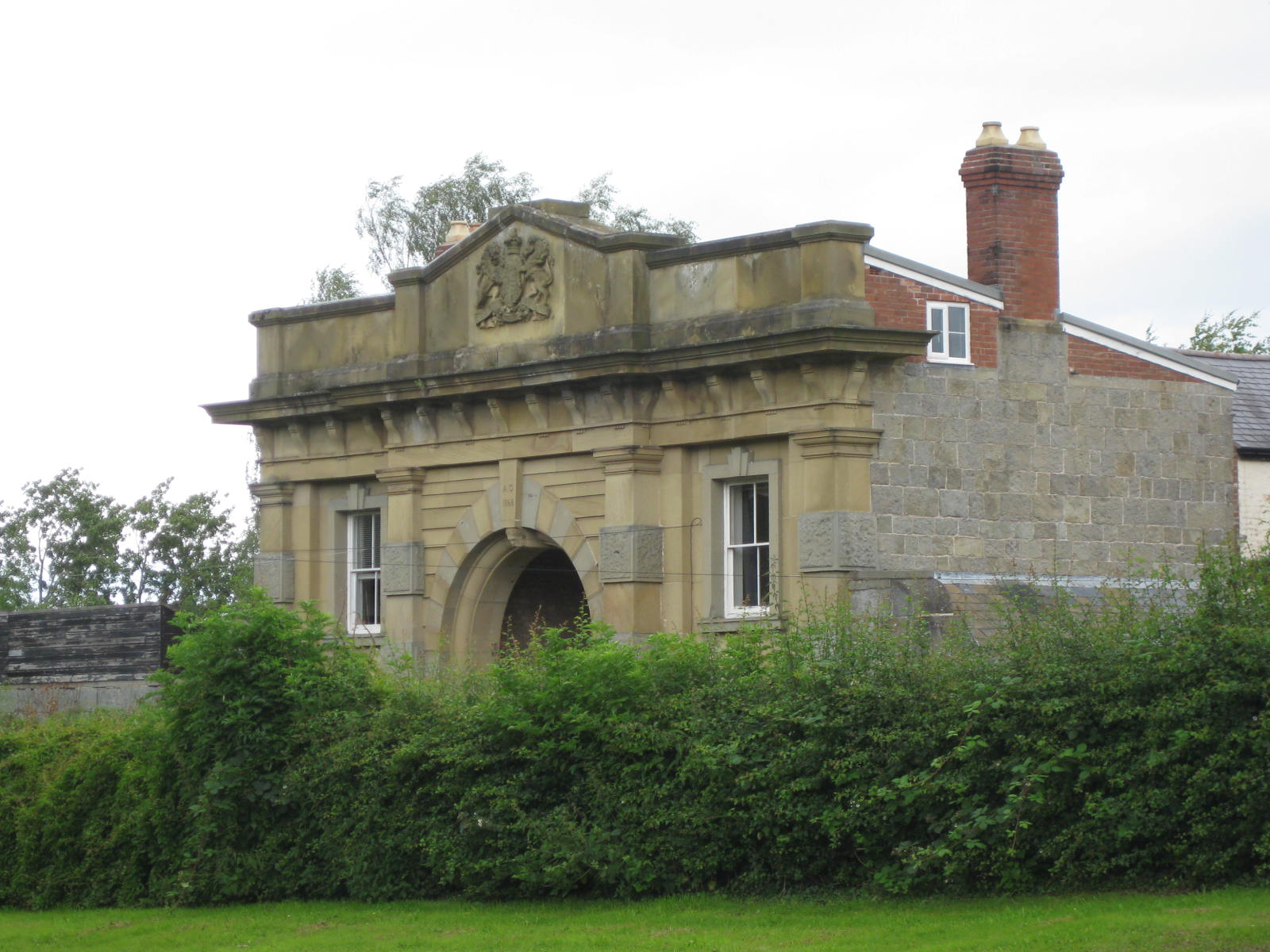
Montgomery Gaol Gateway by Poundley and Walker 1866

- Ruthin Town Hall, Denbighshire, 1863-5.
- Llanidloes Magistrates Court and Lock-up 1864
- Llanfair Caereinion Police Station/Lock up 1869
- Montgomery Gaol Gatehouse (former).

=== Schools ===
- Kerry School 1886. A whitish yellow brick is used and the large schoolroom was lit with a tall gothic window and adjacent to which is a tower surmounted with a louvered belfry (as on the parish church) with a spire on-top. The composition is more ecclesiastical than scholastic. When the County Architect, Herbert Carr came to extend the school c.1952 he careful matched the brickwork and added stone rustication that matched that on the earlier building.
- Llanidloes. former National School (Glandwr School), Gorn Road. Attributed. Typical arched braced gables and yellow brick.

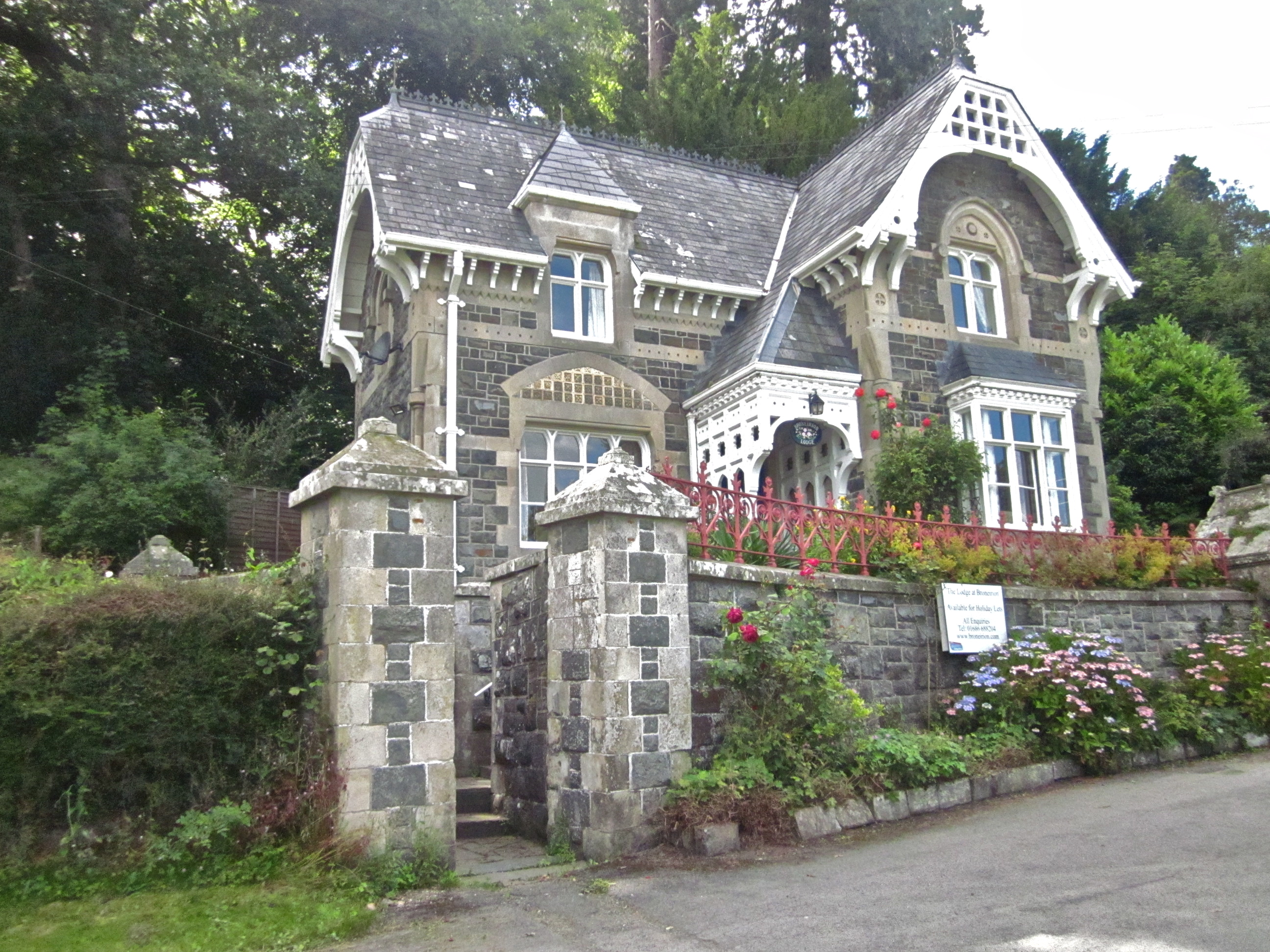
Broneirion, Gate Lodge

=== Houses ===
- Broneirion, Llandinam, Montgomeryshire 1864.
- Broneirion Lodge, Llandinam, Montgomeryshire 1864.
- Abbeycwmhir Hall, Radnorshire 1866/8
- Abbeycwmhir Keeper’s Cottage.
- Dolforwyn, Castell Forwyn Abermule. 1866., Montgomeryshire
- Nantclwyd Hall, Llanelidan, Denbighshire. 1850 House by James Kellaway Colling greatly expanded by David Walker, probably after 1864.

=== Churches ===
- Carno, Montgomeryshire 1862–67.
- Abbeycwmhir Radnorshire
- Darowen, Montgomeryshire 1862-4
- Llanbedr Dyffryn Clwyd
- Llanwyddelan, Montgomeryshire (attributed)
- St Peter’s, Machynlleth, Montgomeryshire. Altered by Poundley and Walker in 1864.
- St Michael, Trefeglwys, Montgomeryshire
- St John, Trefolwern, Llanbrynmair, Montgomeryshire 1866–1874. The church is now ruined.

=== Leighton Hall Estate ===
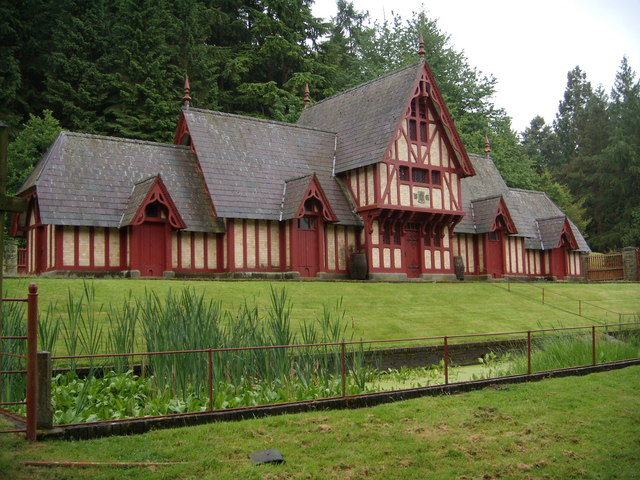
Leighton Poultry House by Poundley and Walker

- Model Farm c1839-60
- Poultry House 1861. Now restored by the Landmark Trust
- Poultry Cottage
- Slurry Enclosure
- Cilcewydd Mill, a sawmill for the Leighton Estates.
- Cilcewydd Semi-detached double villa c.1863. Yellow brick with two arch braced gables

=== Nantcribba Estate ===
- Nantcribba Hall. Alterations to the frontage made by Poundley and Walker.
- Model Farm 1874 (?completion)
- Nantcribba Farmhouse c1865
- Workers Cottages. Red brick
- Gatehouse. Yellow brick, single storey.

=== Brynllywarch Estate, Kerry ===
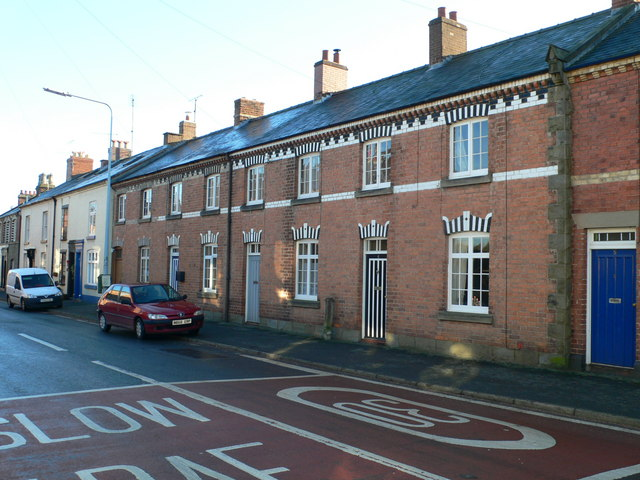
Terraced housing, Kerry Probably by Poundley for Naylor Estates.

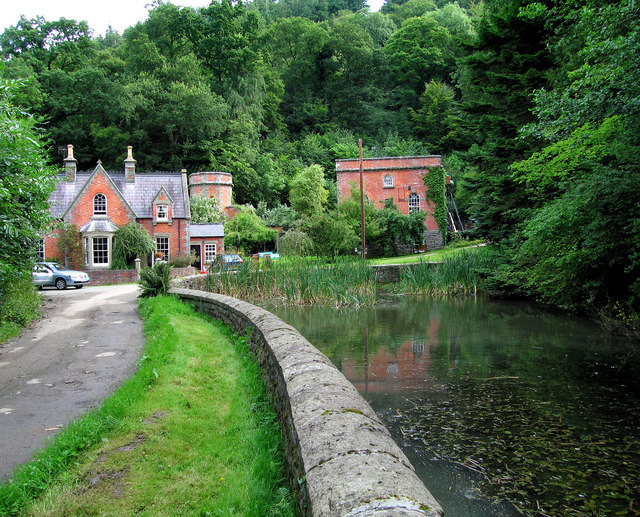
Estate Houses by Poundley and Walker at Leighton, Powys

Extensive estate housing with typical red brick and stone rusticated quoining. An unusual composition by Poundley and Walker was a terrace of houses built for Naylor next to the former Kerry workhouse. The red bricks are punctuated by a double string of white brick and a pattern of white and black bricks below the eaves and for the upper voussoirs. The use of curved bricks in the voussoirs give the impression of a pharonic head-dress.

- Sawmills
- Glanmule Cottage
- Upper Pengelli. A small holding designed as a model farm.

=== Other work in Kerry ===
- The Old Schoolhouse (by Kerry Church). Alterations by Poundley 1848.
- Reading Room and former Police house 1856, probably by Poundley.
- The National School. Whitish yellow brick and the large schoolroom was lit with a tall gothic window. adjacent to which is a tower surmounted with a louvered belfry (as on the parish church) with a spire on-top. More ecclesiastical than scholastic. When the County Architect, Herbert Carr came to extend the school in about 1952 he careful matched the brickwork and added stone rustication that matched that on the earlier building.

=== Earl of Cawdor’s Cardigan and Pembroke Estates: Model Farms ===
- Cenarth, Gelligatti.
- St Ismael’s Tanyllan
- Stackpole, Pembrokeshire. Rowston.

=== Bridges ===
- Broniarth Meifod 1862. Over the River Banwy. Metal carriageway by Woodall of Dudley.
- Rhydlydan, between Llanwnog and Aberhafesp,

=== Railways and Roads ===
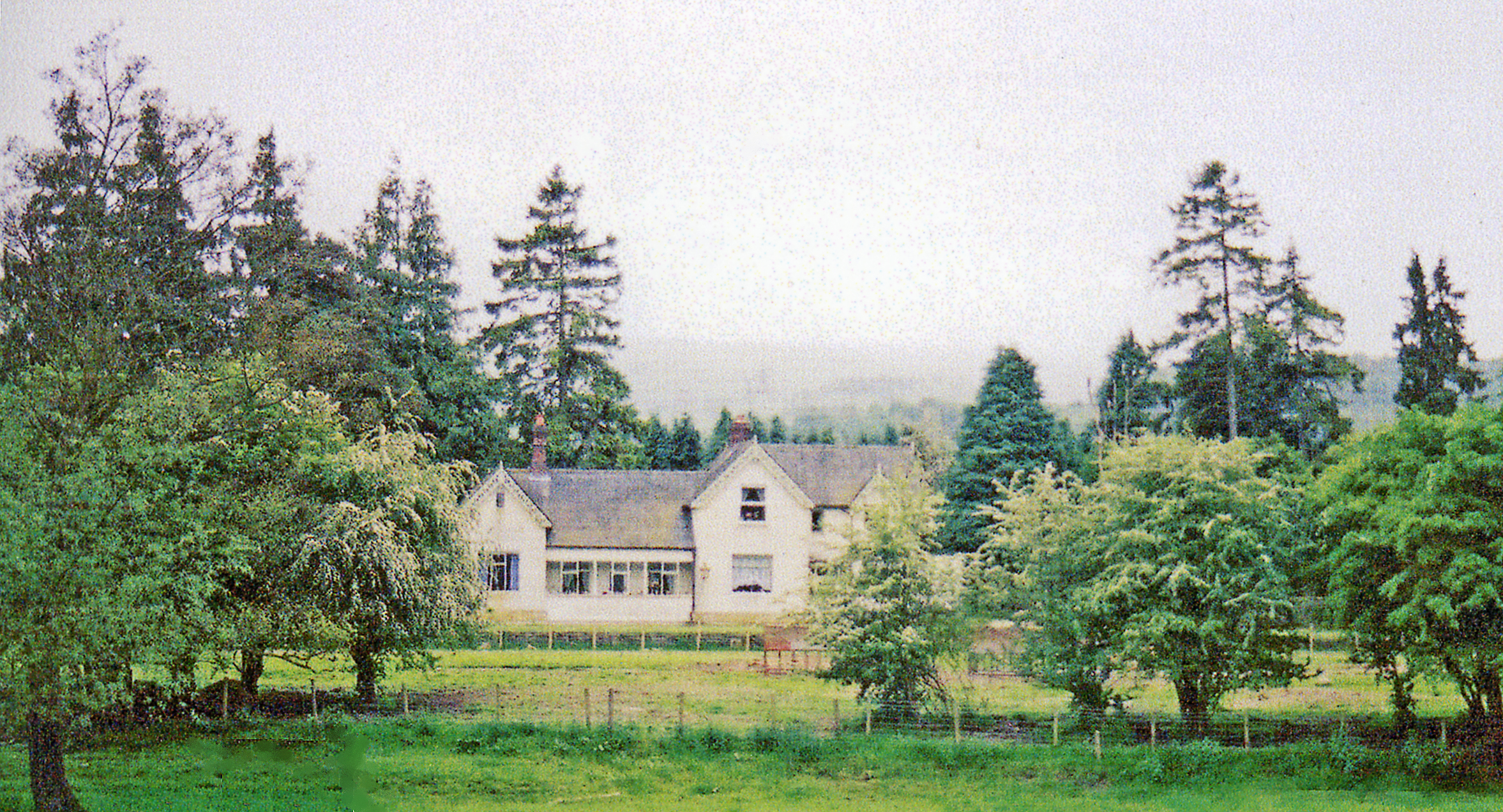
Kerry Station at Glanmule

- Kerry Station – typical Poundley ornate bargeboards

As county surveyor, Poundley is likely to have been involved in various road building improvement schemes and he ‘engineered the new road from the Pentre in Kerry to the Anchor.

== Works by David Walker ==
Works which were completely after the dissolution of the partnership with Poundley in 1867.

=== Public Buildings ===
- Welshpool, former Powysland Museum, 1874
- Newtown, The Market Hall, 1870. At one point, the front of the building was covered by a fake facade. It has since been removed to show the original building
- Newtown, former Police Station, Back Lane 1870

=== School ===
- Trefeglwys. Former School 1872. Attributed. The characteristically carved bargeboards would support an attribution to Walker. The Master’s house was on the left and the projecting gabled lobbied entrance has gothic windows with decorative yellow brick dressing.

=== Churches ===
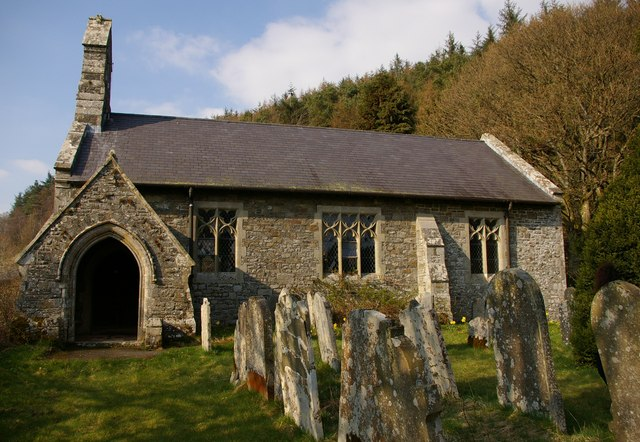
St Anno's Church, Llananno, Radnorshire. Rebuilt by Walker 1877-8

- Beaumont, St. Mary (1887–1889) Cumberland
- Birkenhead, St. Peter (1866–1868)
- Great Sutton, St John the Evangelist, 1878–82.
- Gwernaffield, Holy Trinity (1871–1872) Flintshire.
- St Anno's Church, Llananno, Radnorshire. Rebuilt church in 1877-8.
- Rhyl, St. John the Baptist (1884–1890) Flintshire.
- West Derby, St. Nathaniel (1868–1869) Lancashire
- Newtown St David’s. Replaced Thomas Penson’s apse.

== Works by T G Newnham ==
- Dolfor, St. Paul, (1837–1852) Montgomeryshire. St David’s Diocese
- Llanmerewig, St. Llwchaiarn (1838–1840) Montgomeryshire

== Literature ==
- Antonia Brodie (ed) Directory of British Architects, 1834–1914: 2 Vols, British Architectural Library, Royal Institute of British Architects, 2001
- Cozens L et al. The Mawddwy, Van and Kerry Branches. Oakwood Press, 2nd ed, 2004
- Hubbard E (1986). The Buildings of Wales: Clwyd (Denbighshire and Flintshire), Penguin/Yale.
- R Scourfield and R Haslam (2013), The Buildings of Wales: Powys; Montgomeryshire, Radnorshire and Breconshire Yale University Press .

== Poundley and Walker Gallery ==
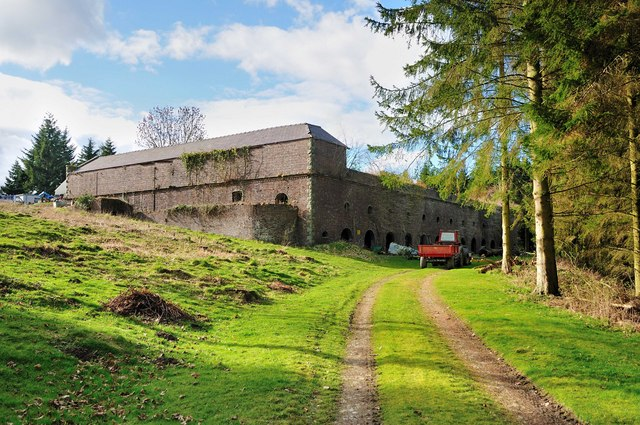
Stone built Slurry tank at Moel y Mab. Part of the Leighton Model Farm.

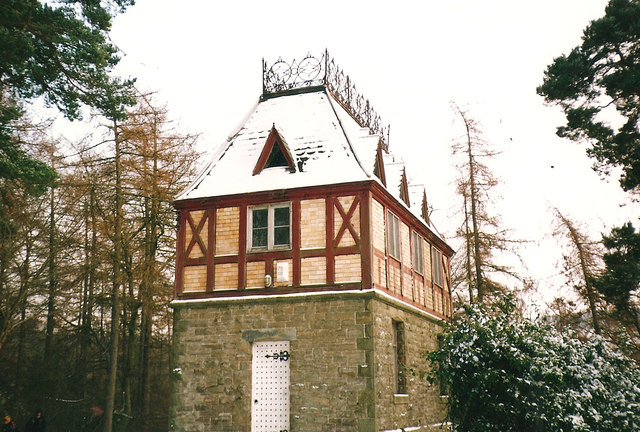
Leighton Hall Summerhouse.Originally the top engine house for the funicular that fed the slurry tank, this was later used as a summerhouse.

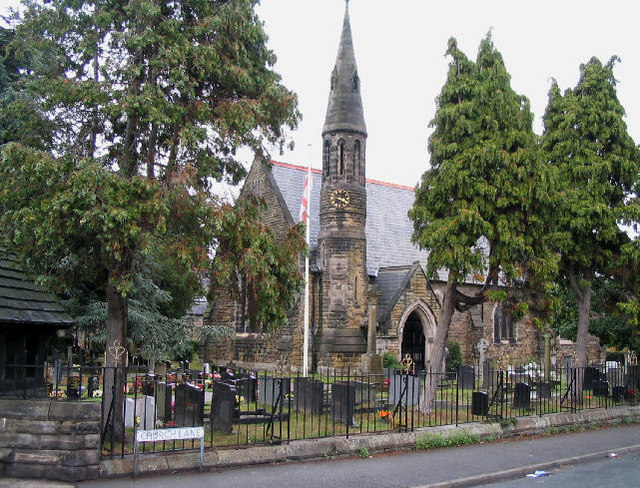
St. John the Evangelist Parish Church, Great Sutton. By David Walker, 1876

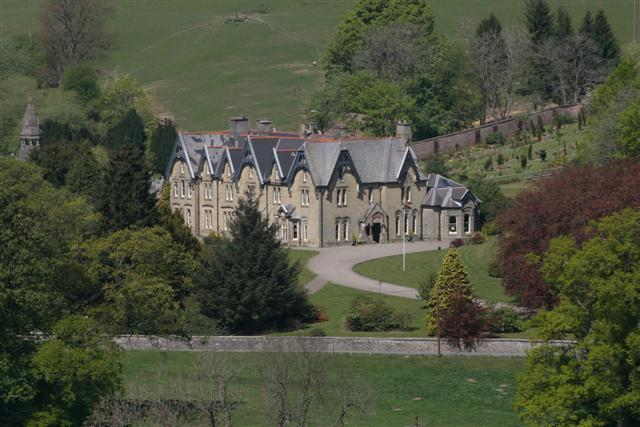
Abbey-Cwm-Hir Hall. By Poundley and Walker 1866-9

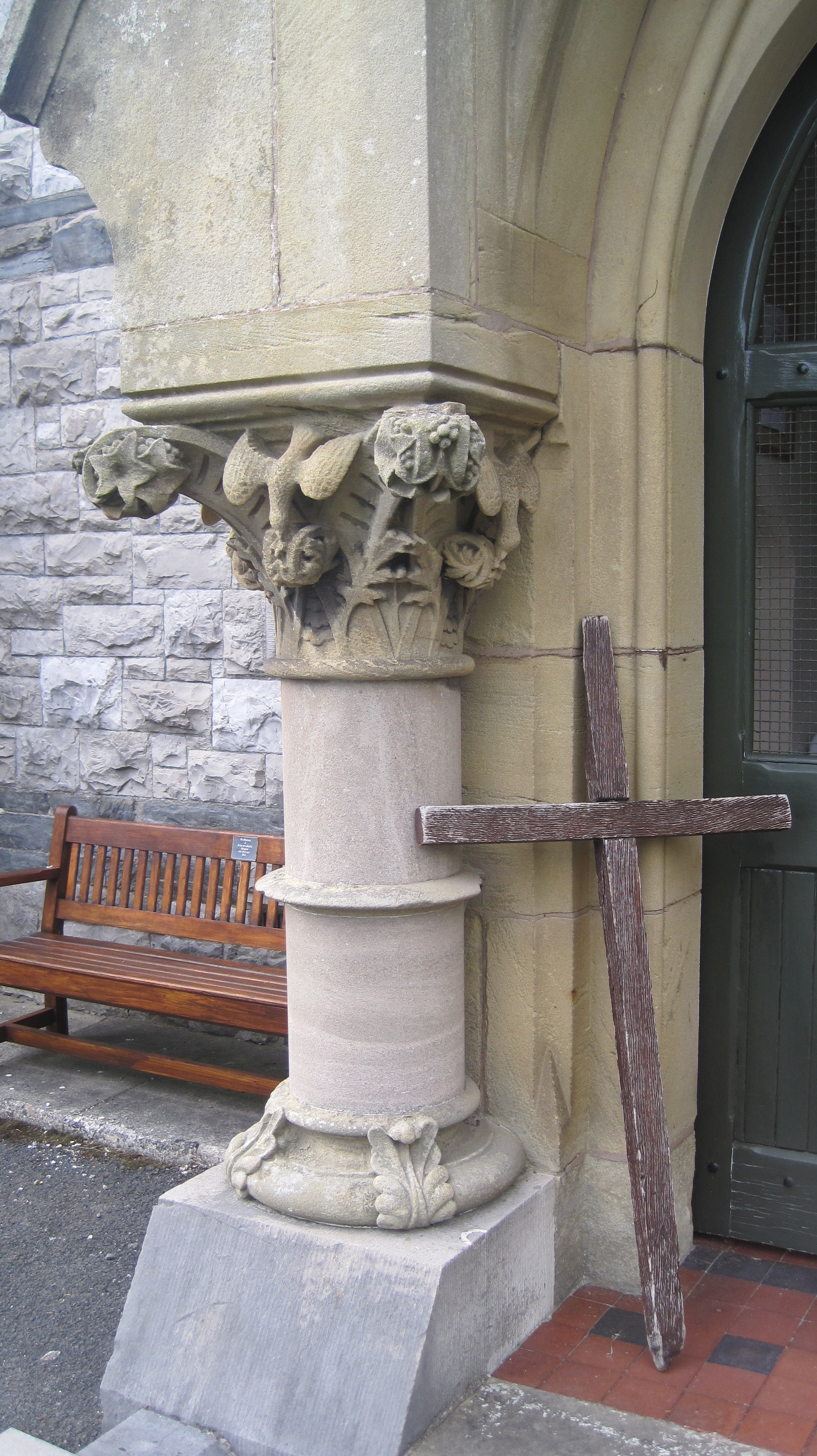
Eglwys San Pedr, Llanbedr Dyffryn Clwyd,

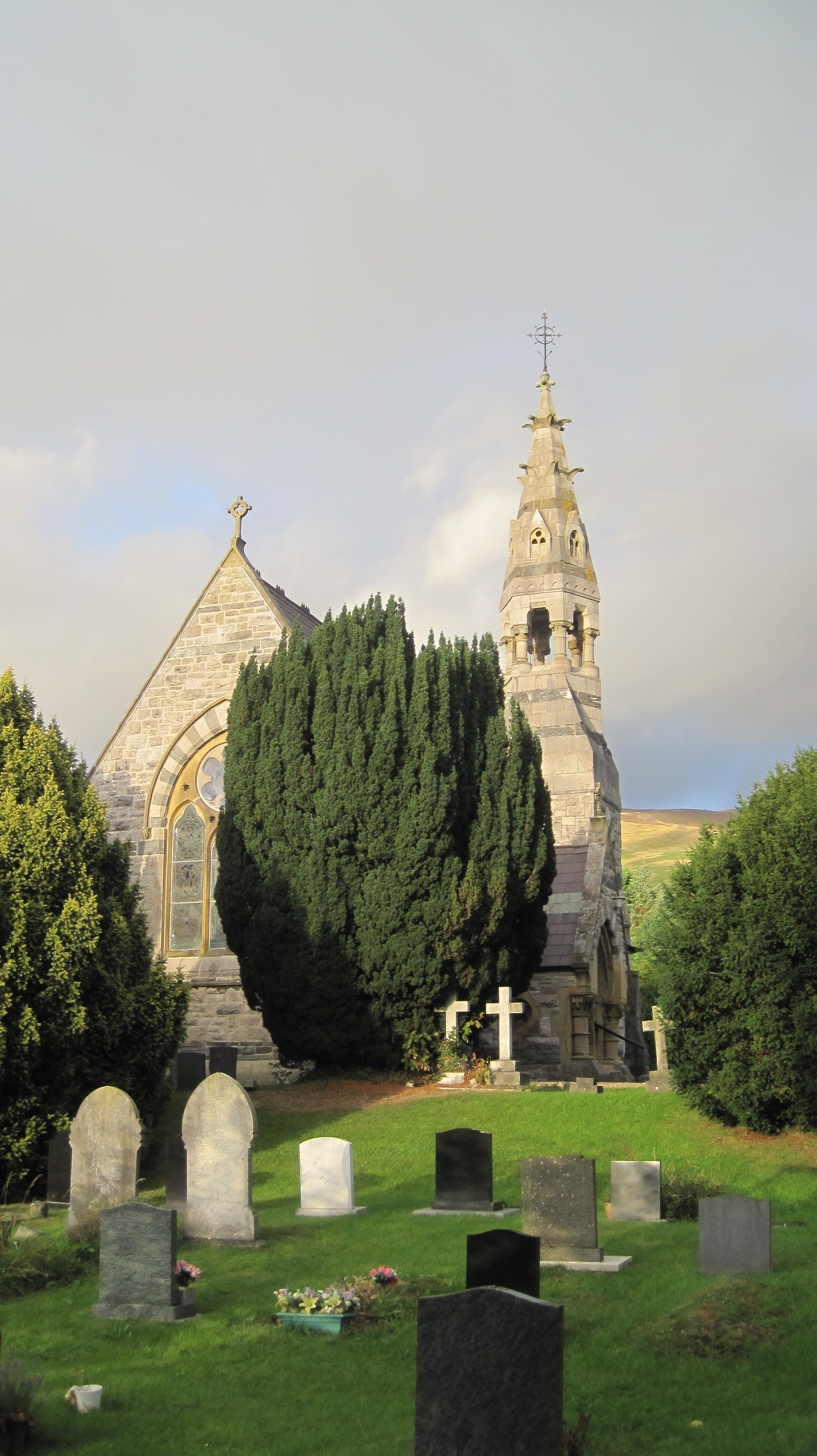
Eglwys San Pedr, Llanbedr Dyffryn Clwyd,

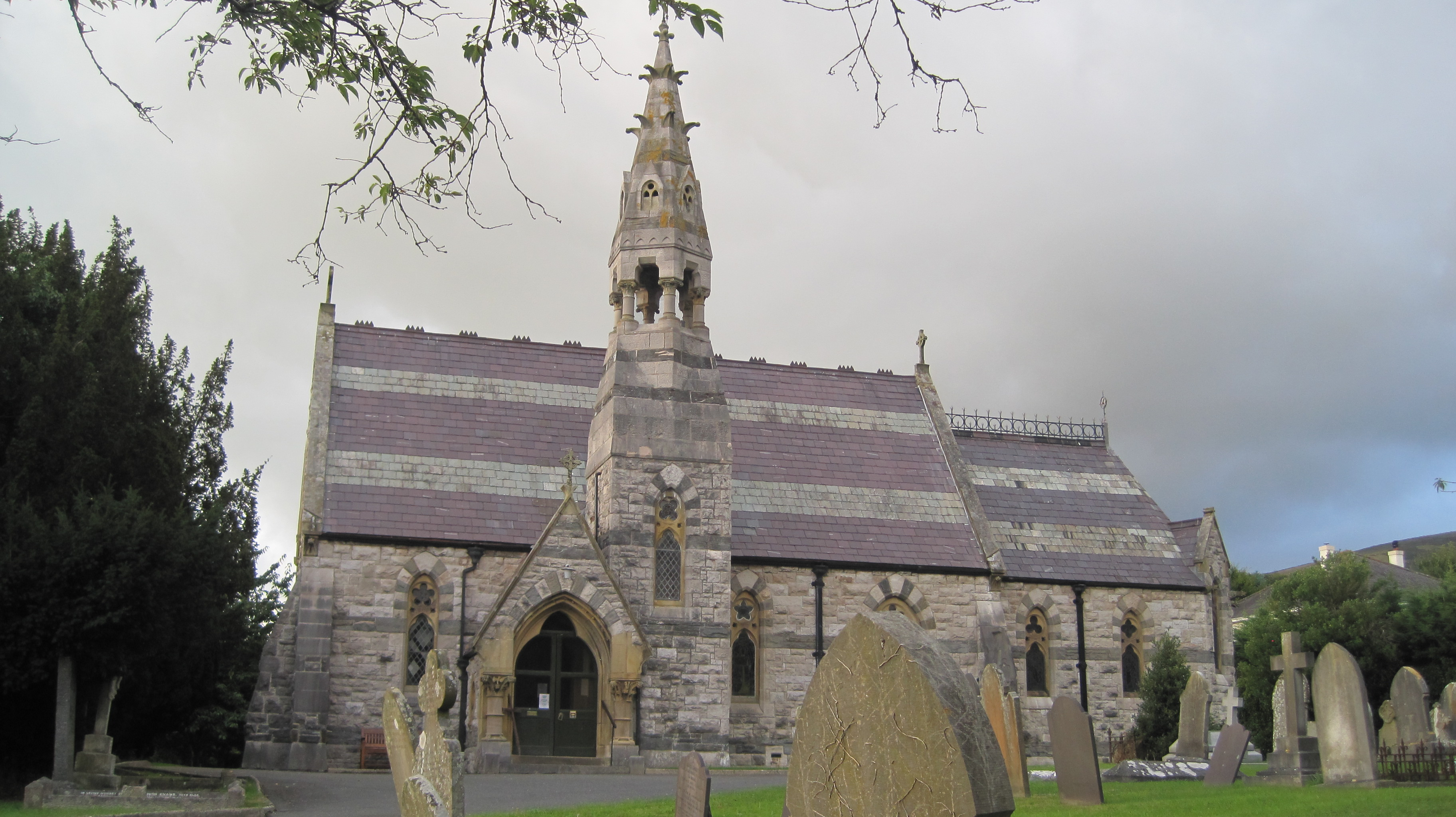
Eglwys San Pedr, Llanbedr Dyffryn Clwyd

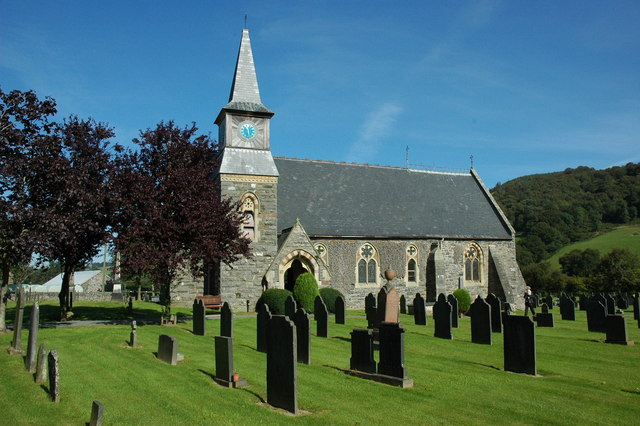
Carno Church

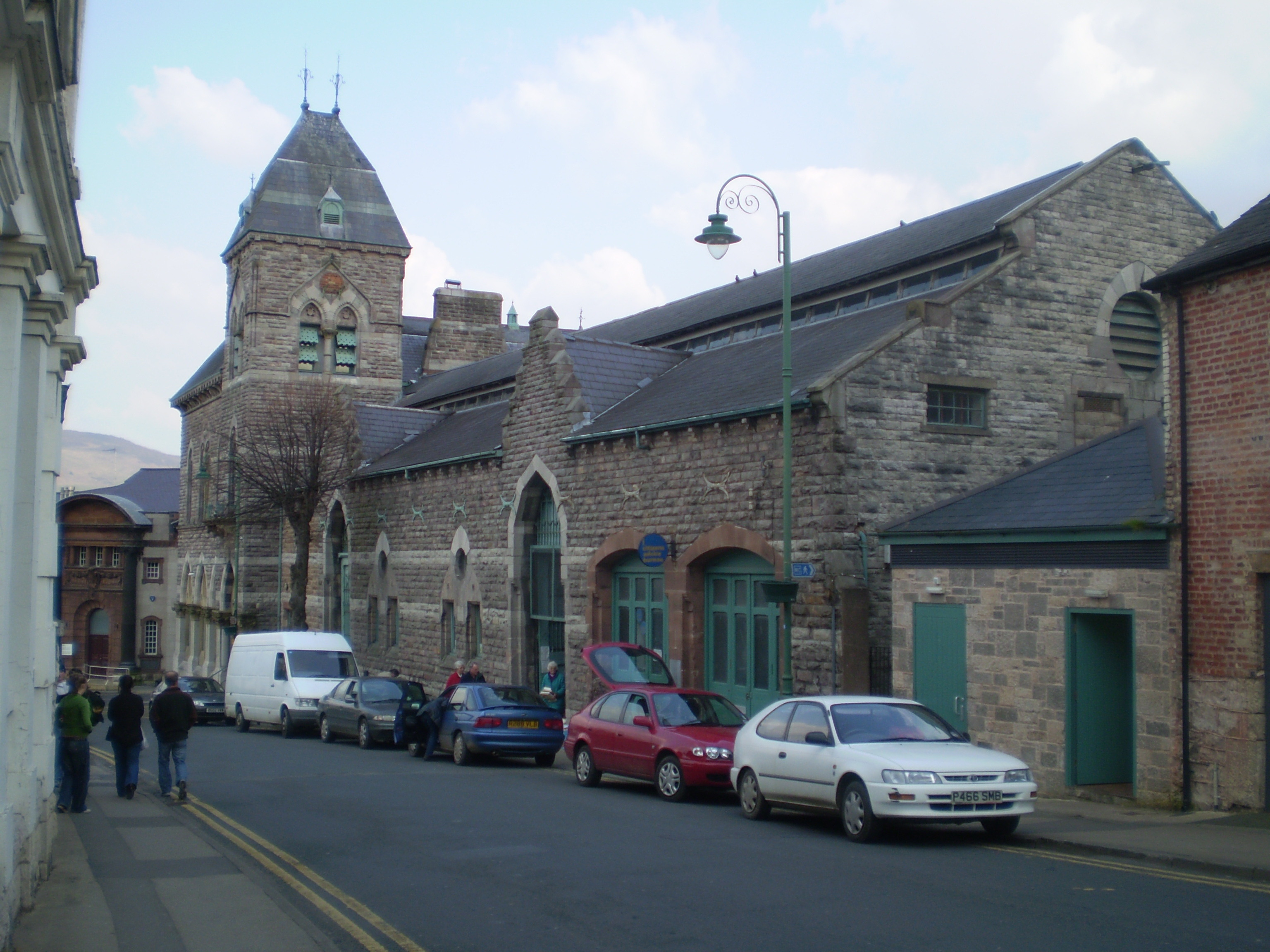
Ruthin Town Hall and Market Hall
