= Knighton Rural District =

Rural district in the administrative county of Radnorshire, Wales (1894–1974)

Coordinates: 52.345°N 3.051°W

Knighton
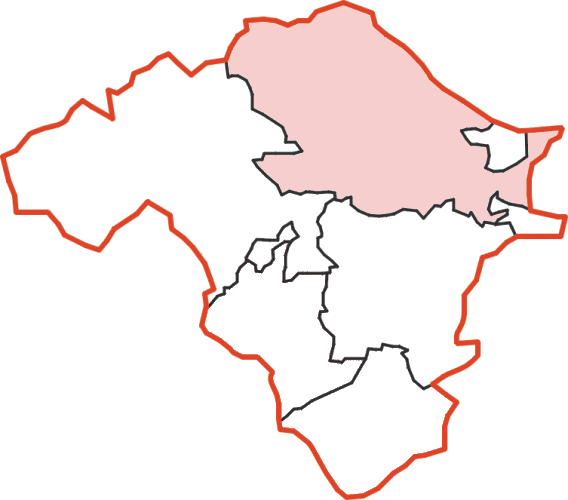
- Area
  - 1911: 88,872 acres (359.65 km^{2})
  - 1931: 88,872 acres (359.65 km^{2})
  - 1961: 88,872 acres (359.65 km^{2})
- Population
  - 1901: 4,856
  - 1931: 3,955
  - 1971: 2,595
- History
  - Origin: Sanitary district
  - Created: 1894
  - Abolished: 1974
  - Succeeded by: Radnorshire
- Status: Rural district
- Government: Knighton Rural District Council
  - HQ: Knighton
- Subdivisions
  - Type: Civil parishes

Knighton was a rural district in the administrative county of Radnorshire, Wales from 1894 till 1974.

The district was formed by the Local Government Act 1894, when the existing Knighton Rural Sanitary District was divided into three: the section in Herefordshire was reconstituted as Wigmore Rural District, that in Shropshire as Teme Rural District, while the remaining section in Radnorshire became Knighton Rural District. The rural district council was based in the town of Knighton which was a separate urban district.

The rural district comprised seventeen civil parishes:

- Beguildy
- Bleddfa
- Cascob
- Discoed
- Heyope
- Knighton
- Litton and Cascob
- Llananno
- Llanbadarn Fynydd
- Llanbister
- Llanddewi Ystradenny
- Llanfihangel Rhydithon
- Llangunllo
- Norton
- Pilleth
- Stanage
- Whitton

The district was abolished in 1974 under the Local Government Act 1972, which completely reorganised local administration in England and Wales. Its area became part of the District of Radnor in the new county of Powys.
