= Kerry, Powys =

Village and community in Powys, Wales

Kerry: Welsh: Ceri
- Location within Powys
- Population: 794 (2021)
- OS grid reference: SO146899
- Principal area: Powys
- Preserved county: Powys
- Country: Wales
- Sovereign state: United Kingdom
- Post town: NEWTOWN
- Postcode district: SY16
- Dialling code: 01686
- Police: Dyfed-Powys
- Fire: Mid and West Wales
- Ambulance: Welsh
- UK Parliament: Montgomeryshire and Glyndŵr
- Senedd Cymru – Welsh Parliament: Montgomeryshire
- List of places UK Wales Powys 52.5012°N 3.25803°W Community map: Map of the community

Kerry (Welsh: Ceri) is a village and geographically large community in Montgomeryshire, Powys, Wales.

The village lies on the A489 road 2.8 miles (4.5 km) southeast of Newtown and possesses two pubs — the Herbert Arms and the Kerry Lamb — a village hall, a bowling green, a post office, a primary school and a hairdresser.

Kerry also has a parish church of Norman origins dedicated to St. Michael and All Angels, as well as a baptist church.

It gives its name to the Kerry Hill breed of sheep.

== Governance ==
The large, rural Kerry community contains the villages of Kerry, Glanmule, Dolfor and Sarn. It is divided into three wards (Kerry, Dolfor and Sarn) and for Powys County Council the community is an electoral division/ward (called Kerry). It falls in the historic county of Montgomeryshire.

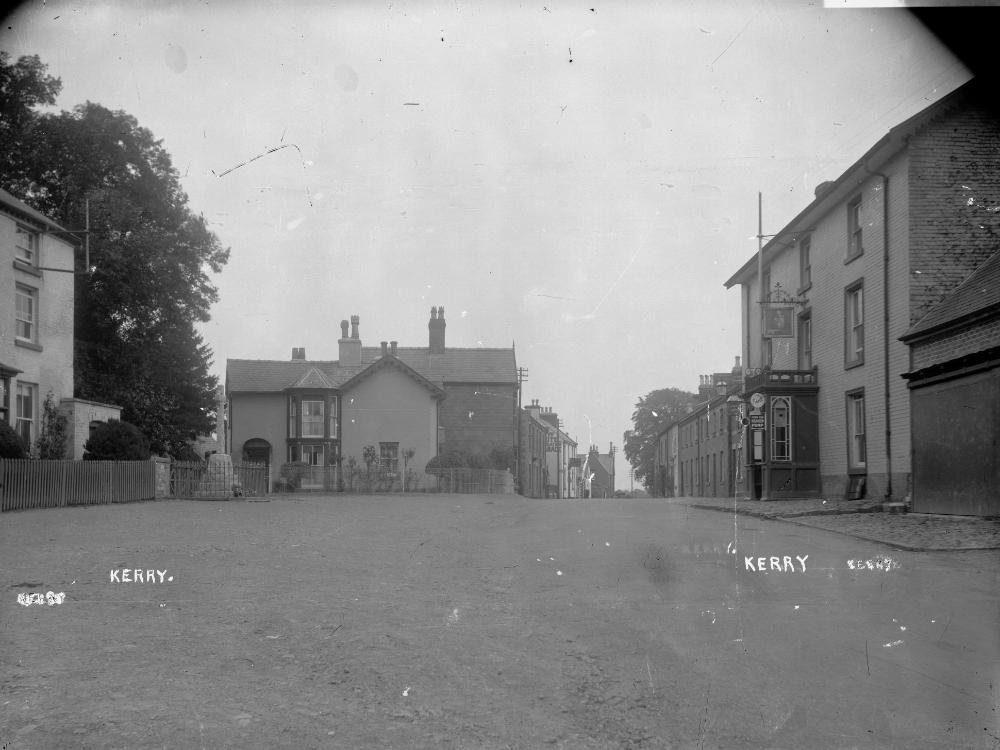
Photograph by Percy Benzie Abery; c. 1910.

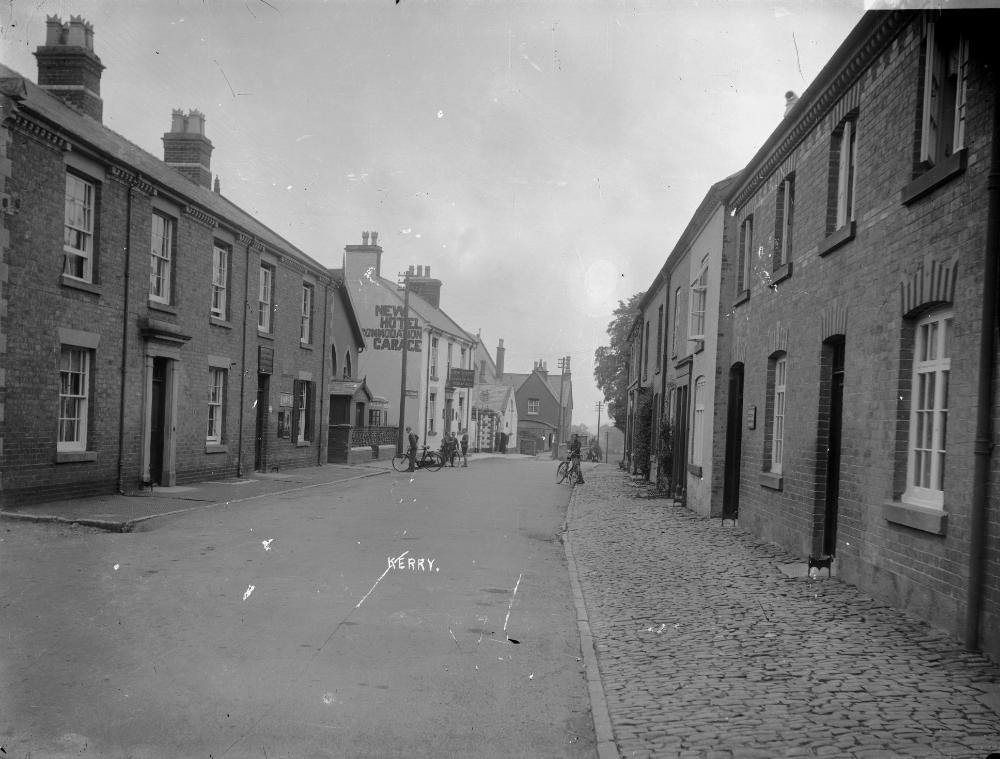
Photograph by Percy Benzie Abery; c. 1910.

== History ==
The Battle of Kerry was fought nearby in 1228 between Llywelyn Fawr and Hubert de Burgh.

The area around the village was the Welsh commote and Lordship of Ceri, part of the region of Rhwng Gwy a Hafren, and it was originally ruled by the Princes of Maelienydd and their descendants.

Kerry was the terminus of the Kerry Railway, later a branch of the Cambrian Railways, connecting it to Abermule that ceased operating in 1956. The narrow gauge Kerry Tramway brought timber from the forests to the main line station.

== Population ==
The population of Kerry has shown a slight increase in recent years:

Year	Population
2001	745
2011	785
2021	794

== St. Michael's Church ==
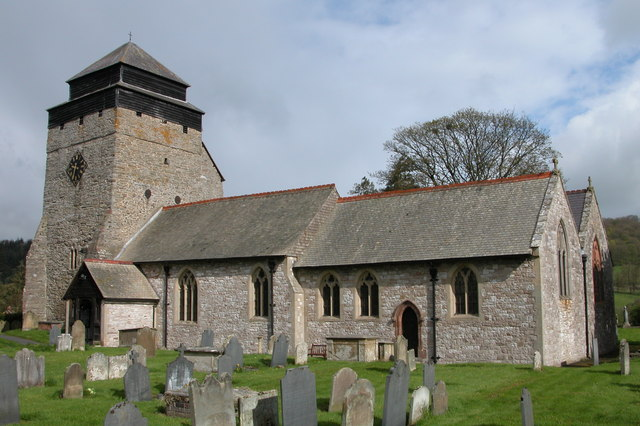
St. Michael's Church

St. Michael's Church of Kerry is located within the diocese of St. Asaph and was rededicated in 1176; an earlier church is likely to have occupied the site previously. The parish is very large in comparison to others, stretching as far as Mochdre, Dolfor and Beguildy. It boasts one of only three chained Bibles in Wales, possibly even in the United Kingdom, and is printed according to William Morgan's Welsh translation.

== Dolforgan Hall ==
Dolforgan Hall and estate, was located just outside Kerry. From 1868 to 1883, it was the home of inventor and industrialist James Walton. In 1894, it was purchased by John William Willans, the chief engineer of the Liverpool Overhead Railway, and passed to his son, philanthropist John Bancroft Willans.

== Kerry Hill sheep ==
Kerry was noted for its local breed of sheep and the large sheep fairs that were held in the village. Kerry Hill sheep have a distinctive and unique coloration, with a white face bearing black markings around the mouth, ears, and eyes.

== See also ==
- Cilthriew, Kerry. Timber-Framed farmhouse.
- Upper Pengelli, Kerry. Victorian Model Farm
- Kerry Hill sheep
- J W Poundley and D Walker. Architects and Land Surveyors of Black Hall, Kerry.
