= Llanwnnog =

Village in the county of Powys, Wales

Coordinates: 52.5338°N 3.4431°W

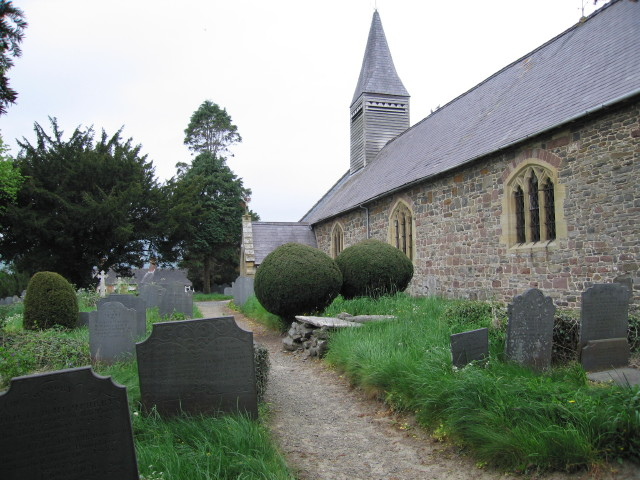
Church of St. Gwynog

Llanwnnog (also spelt Llanwnog) is a village in Powys, Wales. It is located one-and-a half miles north of Caersws in the community of the same name, on the B4568 road. The Ordnance Survey spell the name with a single 'n'. Until 1987 Llanwnog was a community.

== Architecture ==
Llanwnog's parish church is St. Gwynnog's church. The antiquarian Elias Owen was curate here from 1871 to 1875, and in 1873, the church's rood screen was restored by J W Poundley and D Walker. Llanwnnog National School, built in 1850, was designed by the architect Thomas Penson.

== Notable people ==
- Llywelyn ab y Moel (died 1440), a poet and rebel in Owain Glyndŵr's Uprising, was raised in the Llanwnnog area.
- The family of Oliver Mathews (the first historian of Caersws and Shrewsbury) had "settled for many generations at Park in the parish of Llanwnog", and according to historian Richard Williams, Mathews may have been born there.
- Daniel Price, dean of St Asaph from 1696 until his death on 7 November 1706, was born in Llanwnnog.
- The Welsh romantic poet John Ceiriog Hughes is buried in the village churchyard in an ornamental grave with cast iron railings and a memorial plate. He was employed on the Cambrian Railways at Caersws as stationmaster and Manager of the Van Railway from 1868 until his death in 1887.
- Footballer brothers Mart and Fred Watkins's father was from Llanwnnog.
