= Glanmule =

Coordinates: 52.5039501°N 3.2355023°W

Glanmule (Welsh: Glan-miwl) is a small village in the north of Powys, Wales. It is located in Montgomeryshire, approximately 2.5 miles to the east of Newtown. It stands at the junction of the B4368 and A489 roads, two miles from the Welsh-English border.

In the Middle Ages, Glanmule was the regional capital of the commote of Ceri. The village is named for its location on the Afon Miwl.
