= Upper Pengelli, Kerry (Montgomeryshire) =

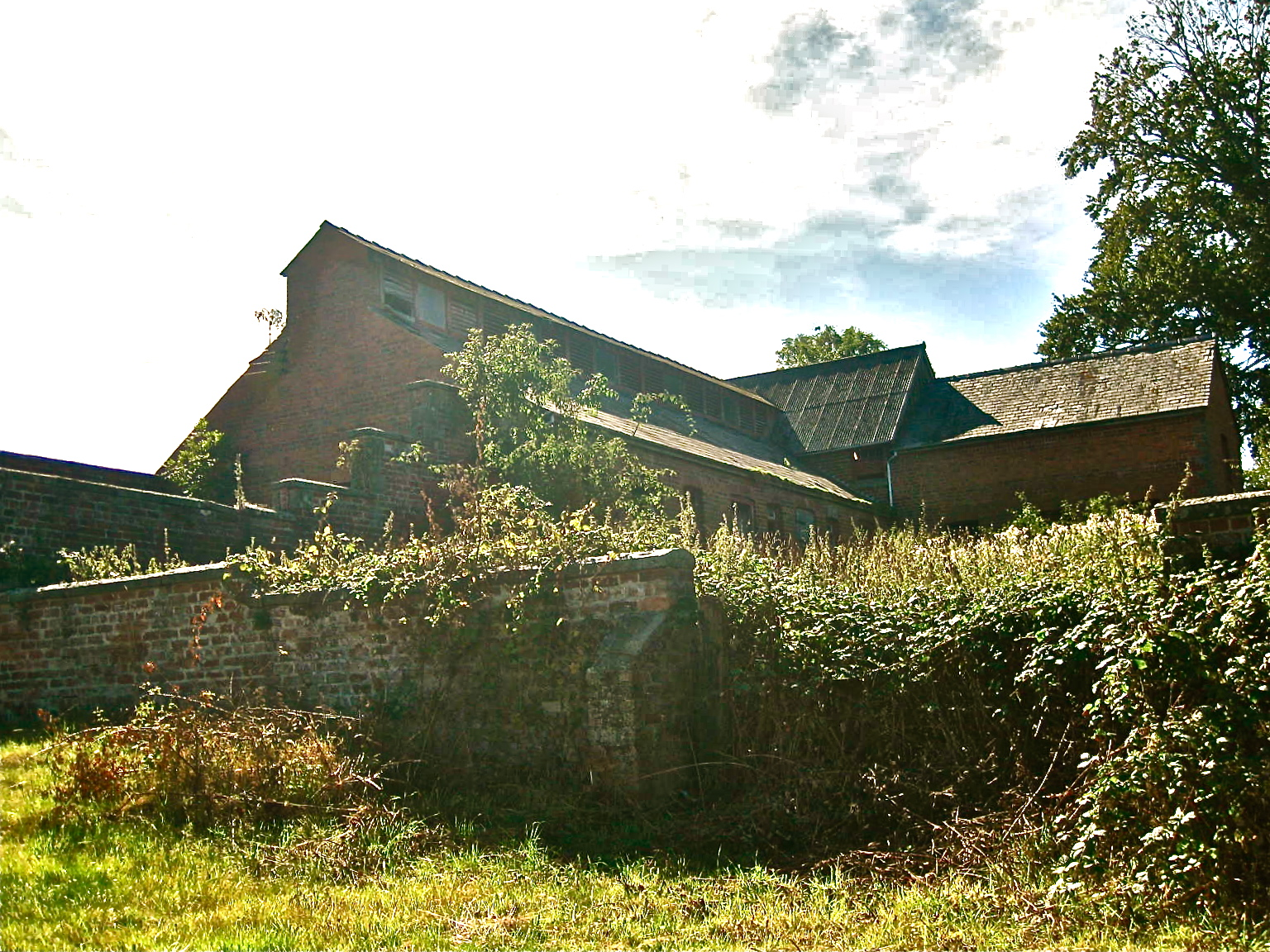
- Upper Pengelli, Kerry is a small mid 19th century model farm in Kerry Montgomeryshire

- Location within Powys
- 52.512240°N 3.210714°W

History
- Built: House 17th Century. Model Farm c1860

Site notes
- Architect: Poundley and Walker
- Architectural style: Timber framed house with 19th century Model Farm

Upper Pengelli is a farm in the township of Pengelli in Kerry in the historic county of Montgomeryshire, which is now part of Powys. The farmhouse is a timber-framed house of Lobby entry type probably dating from the earlier part of the 17th century. A gabled wing was added at a right angles to the main house in the mid-19th century, when it was partly brick faced. The tile hanging on the house which imitates slate is mid-20th century. The farm buildings are an example of a small model or Industrial farm by the architects Poundley and Walker. It was part of the Brynllywarch Estates owned by the Naylor Family. It was sold in 1931 to Montgomeryshire County Council and after 1974 became a Powys County Council Smallholding. In the 1980s it was designated for conversion into a Rural Life Museum. It subsequently became derelict and in 2014 offered for sale by Powys County Council.

== The Model Farm or Homestead ==
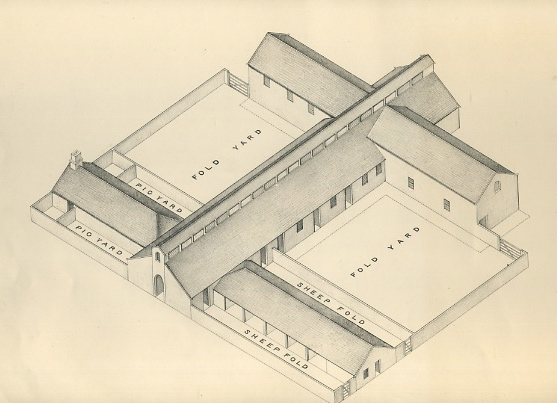
Poundleys Cottage Architecture 01

The design of the farm buildings are based on the design in Poundley's Cottage Architecture which was published in 1857. Poundley was the architect for the Naylor Estates and worked from Black Hall in Kerry. The intention was to build a smaller version of the Victorian Model or Industraial Farms of the mid- 19th century. Poundley would have been working on the much larger farm complex which he had designed for John Naylor at Leighton Hall near Welshpool. Poundley published layout has been modified and scaled down at Upper Pengelli. The long spinal building with a central ventilator, that was for cattle stalls was shortened and pigsties and sheepfolds were parallel with, rather than at right angles to the spinal building. As in the plan the hay barn with its ventilated brick windows and the stabling is at right angles. There was also a root store for feeding the cattle and a raised seed store. The sheep fold later was adapted to be used as cart sheds. The farm would have been highly mechanised with a drive shaft, possibly powered by a steam engine, that runs down the spinal building.

== The Farmhouse ==
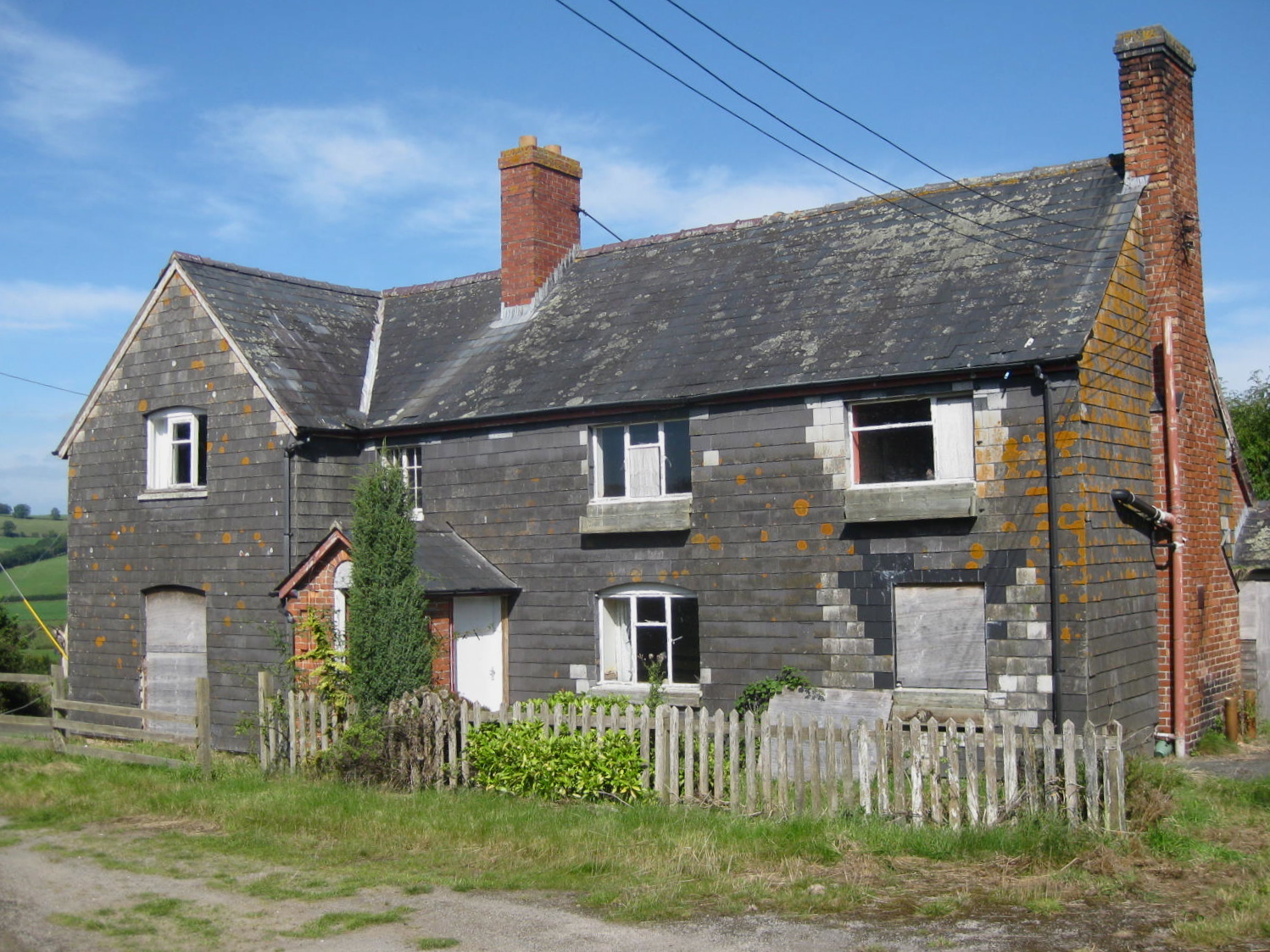
Upper Pengelli, Farmhouse

This stands to the north of the model farm and has striking views over the valley of the upper Mule stream. It appears to be fairly recent in date, but the core of the house is timber framed. Upstairs there is an ‘‘Ornate’’ door opening cut into a wall-plate which is very similar to an example at Cilthriew, Kerry. and is likely to date the building to the early 17th century. A further bay was added to the building and a wing at right angles in the 19th century, when the building was faced in brick. The imitation slate cladding is fairly recent. In more recent times the house was split into two cottages.

== Literature ==
- Wade-Martin S Historic Farm Buildings Batsford, London 1991.

== Upper Pengelli Gallery ==
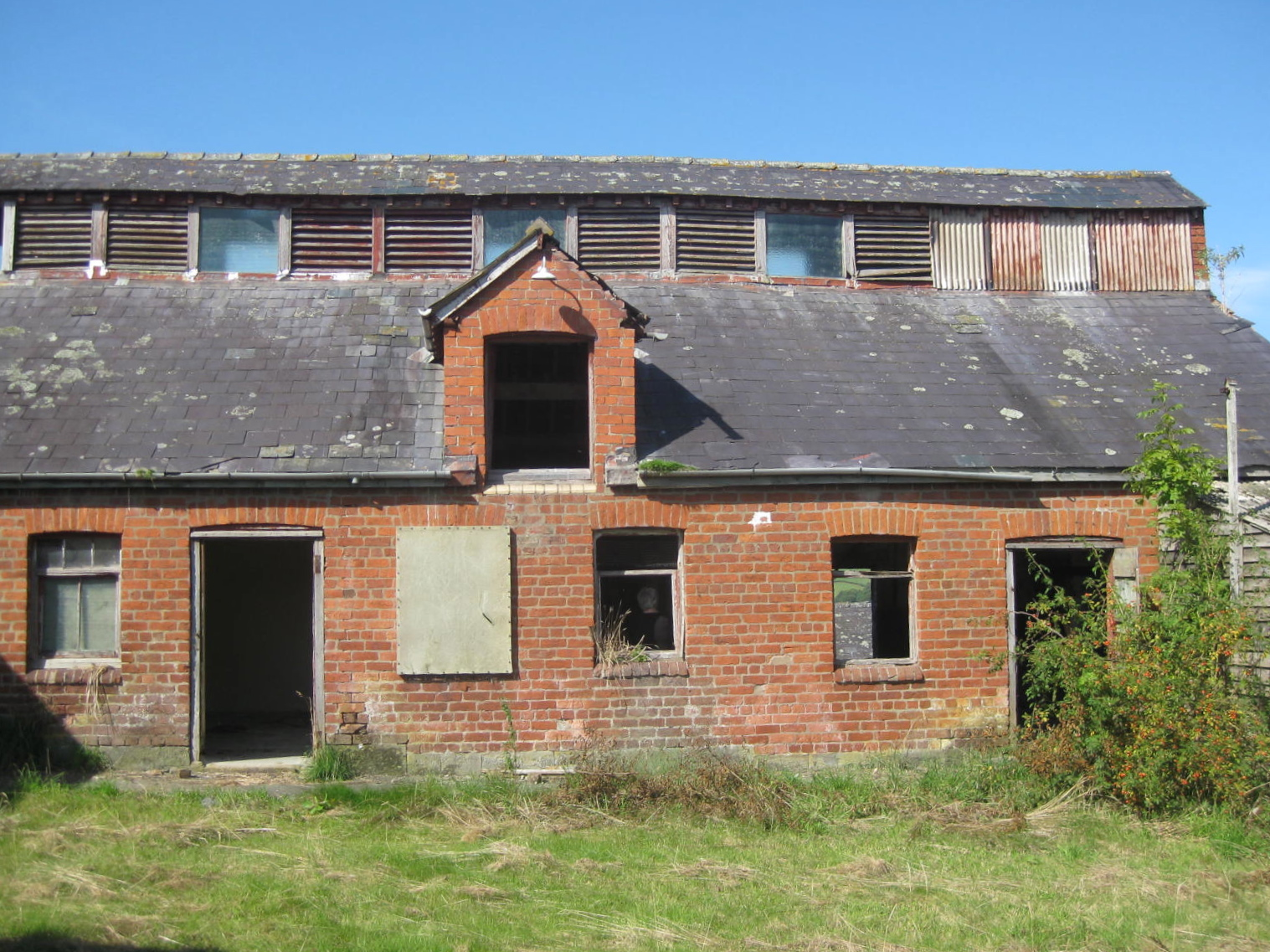
Upper Pengelli, Spine building with milking parlour and wooden slatted ventilators above.

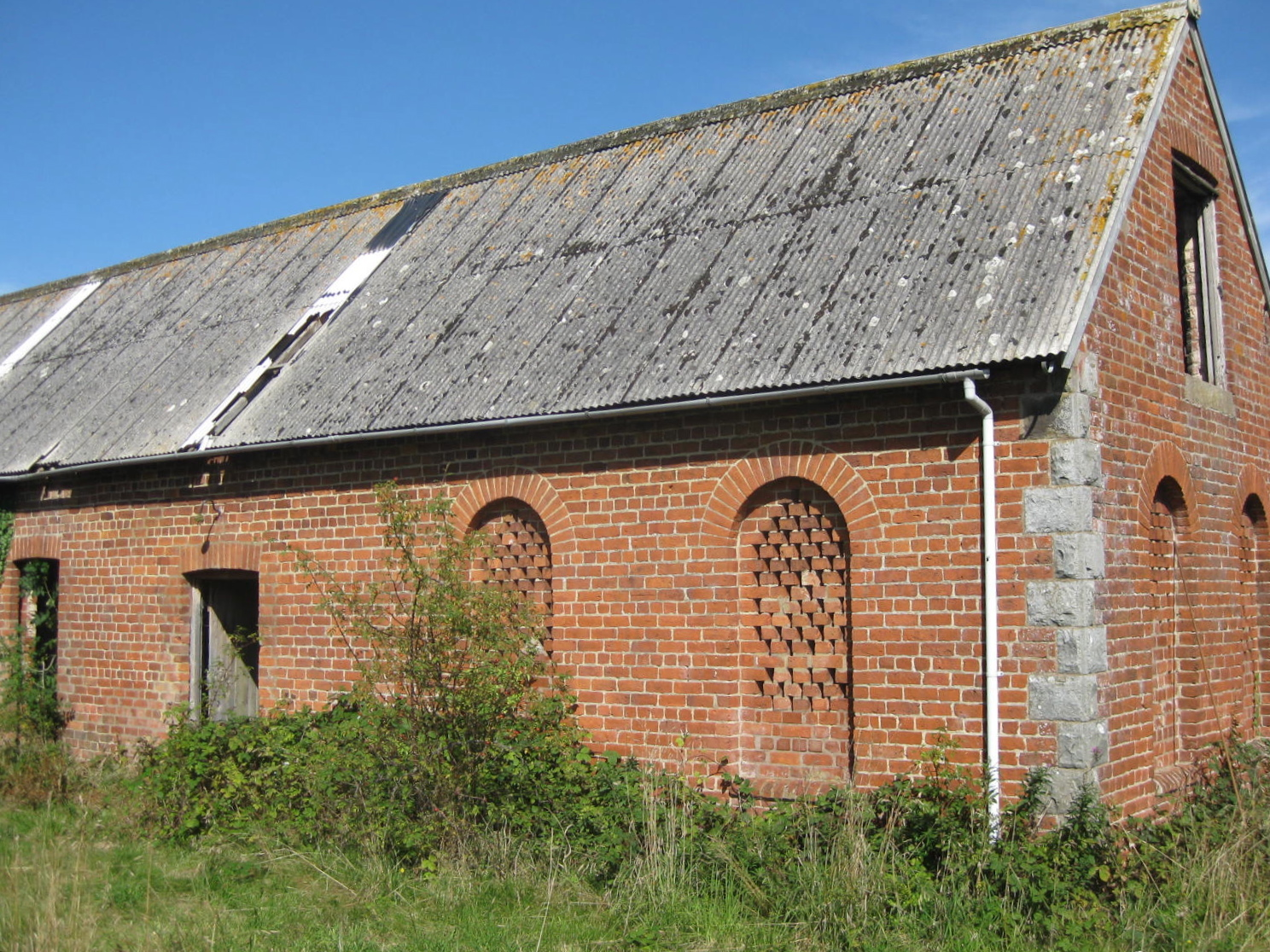
Upper Pengelli Hay barn with brick ventilation and stone rustication to corners

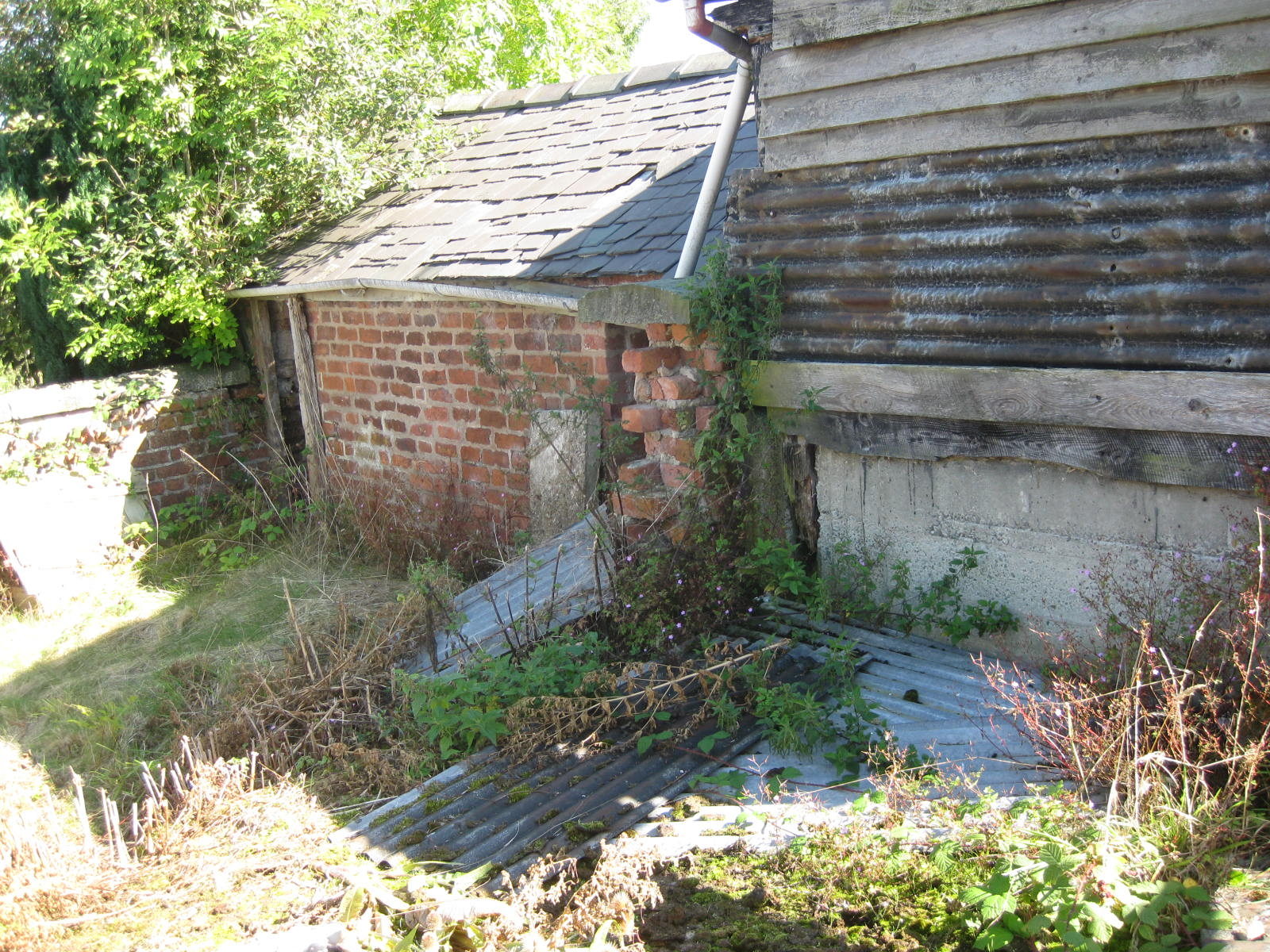
Upper Pengelli Piggery

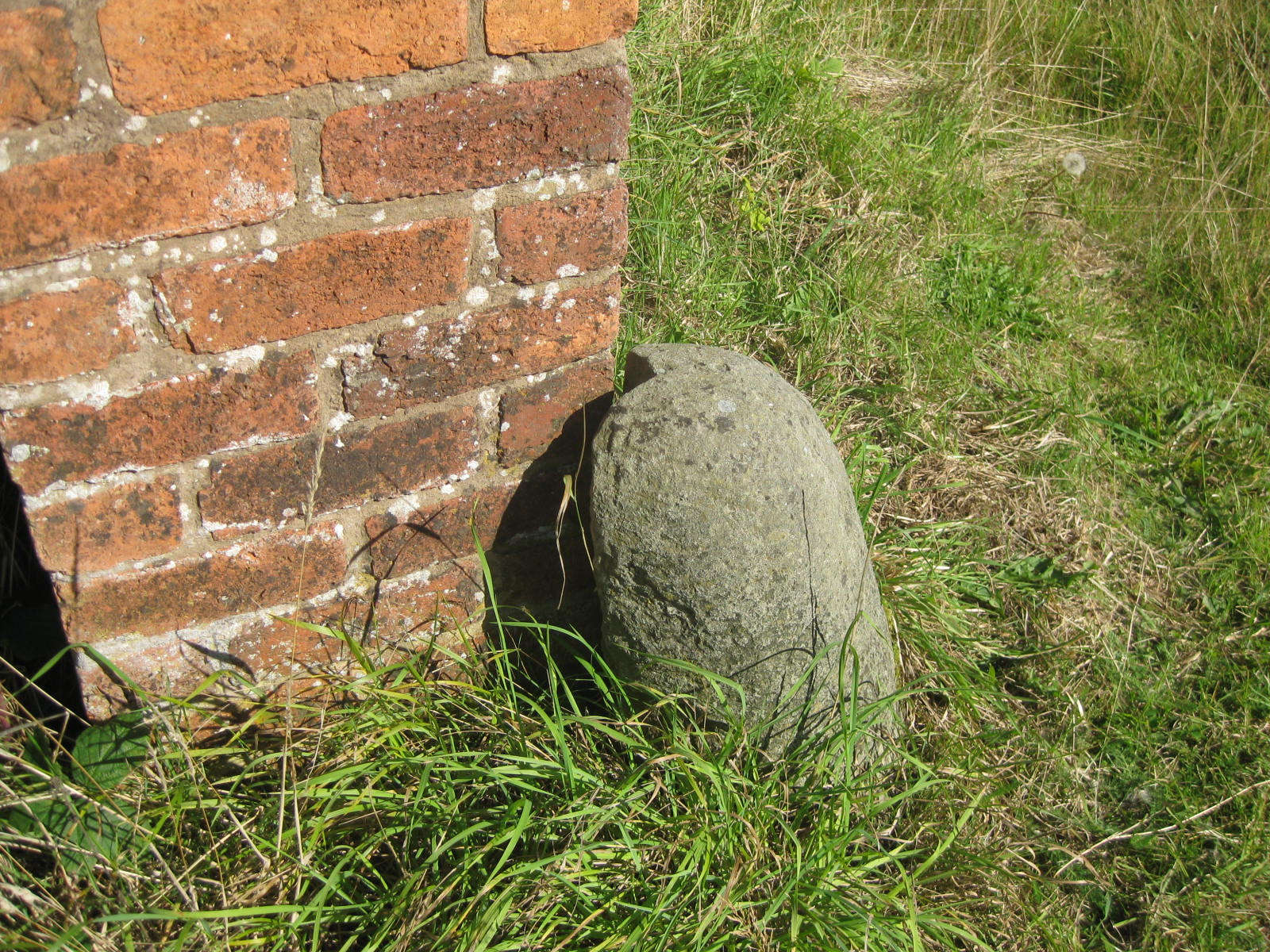
Stone to protect corner brickwork from waggon wheels.

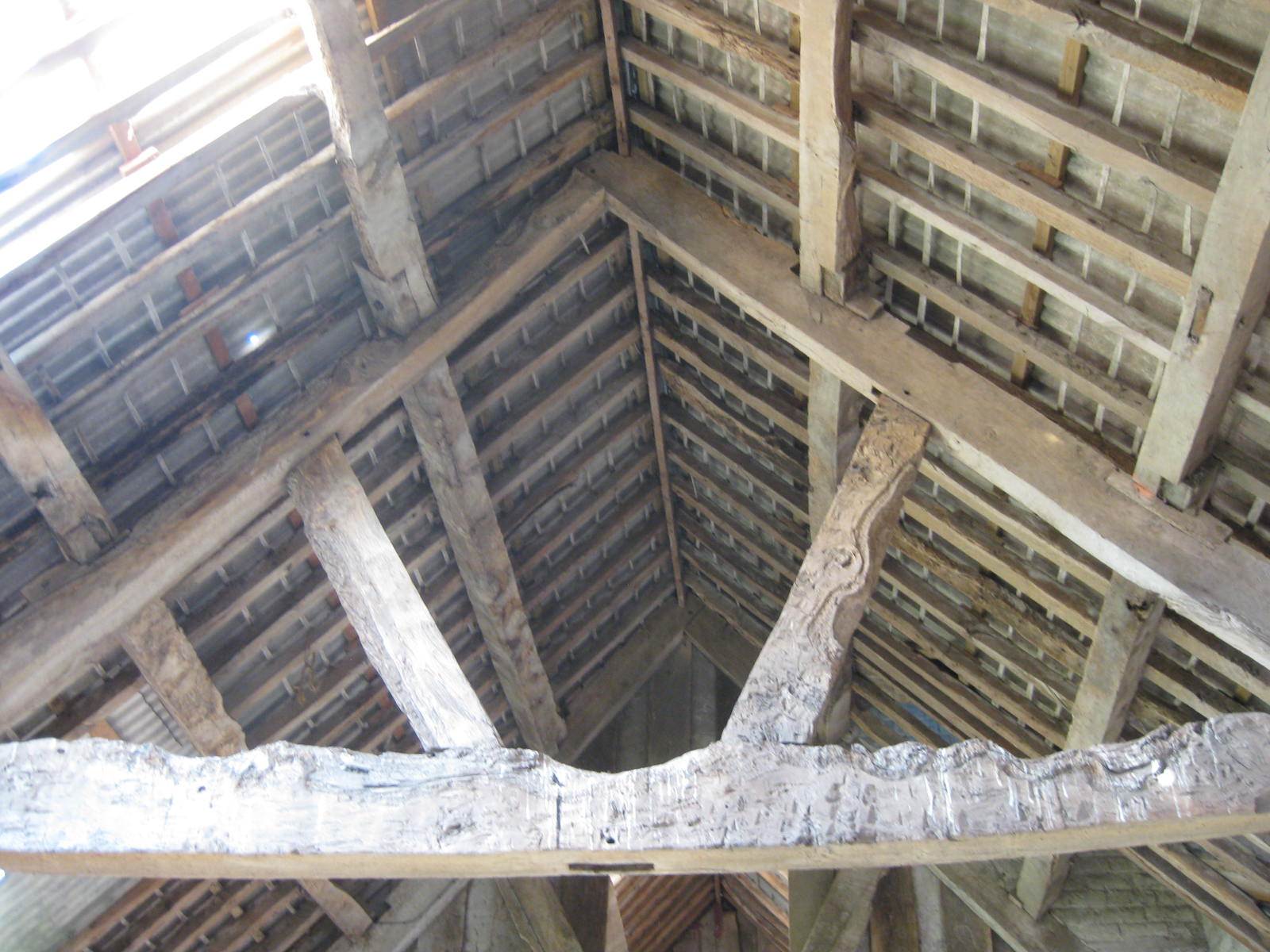
Roof truss in hay barn

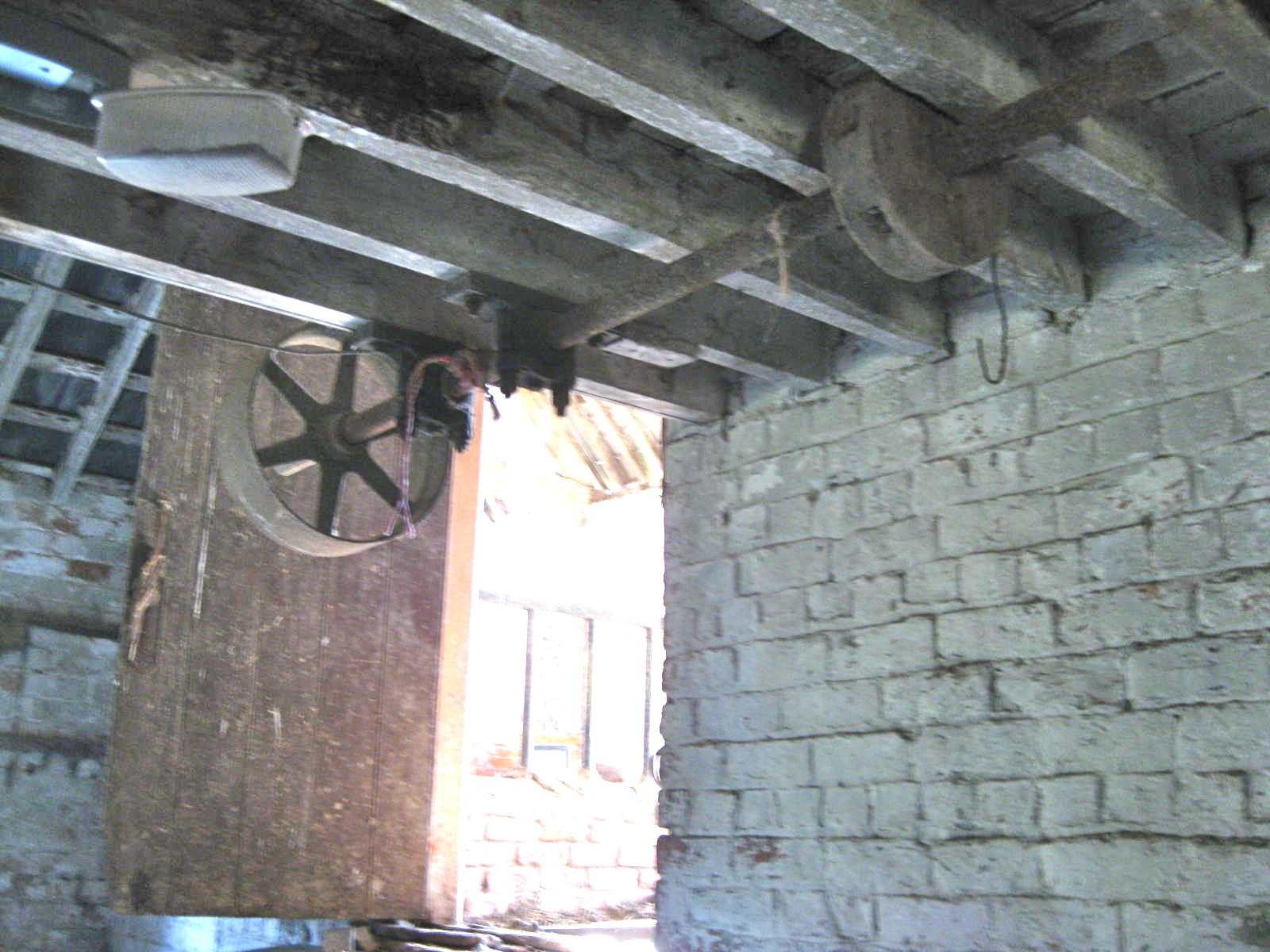
Upper Pengelli. Shows drive shaft in spine building.

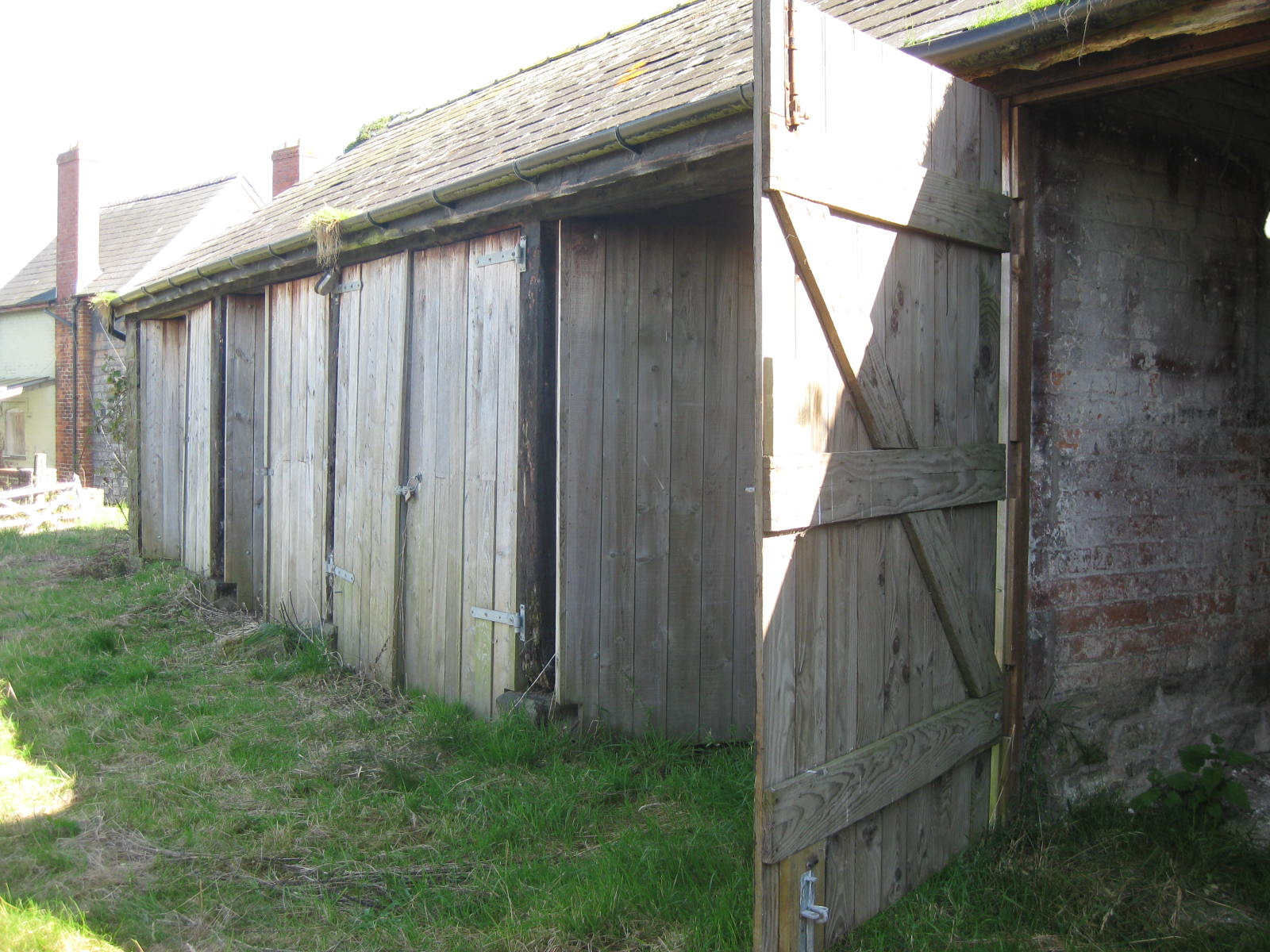
Upper Pengelli, converted sheepfold

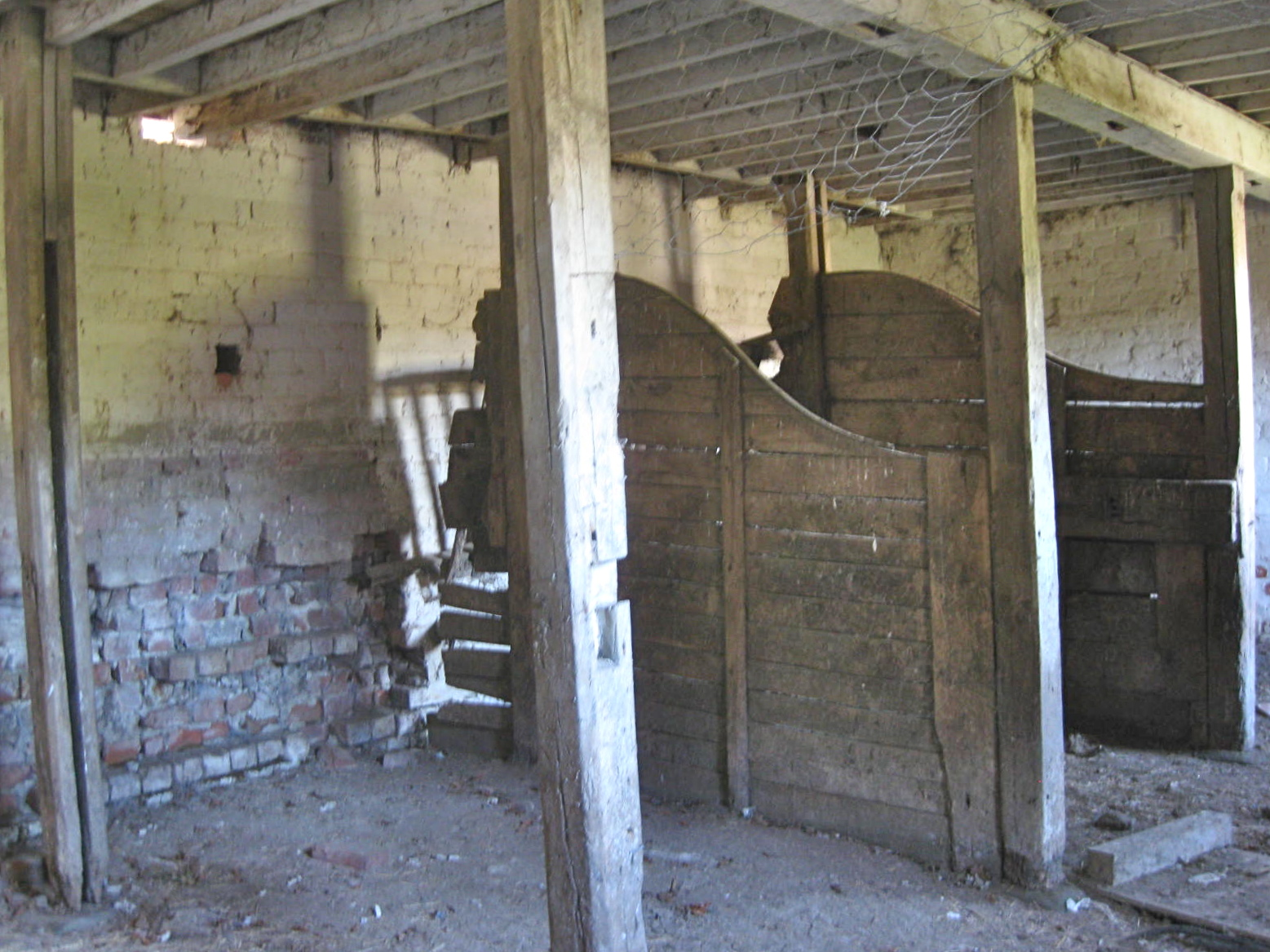
Stalls for working horses

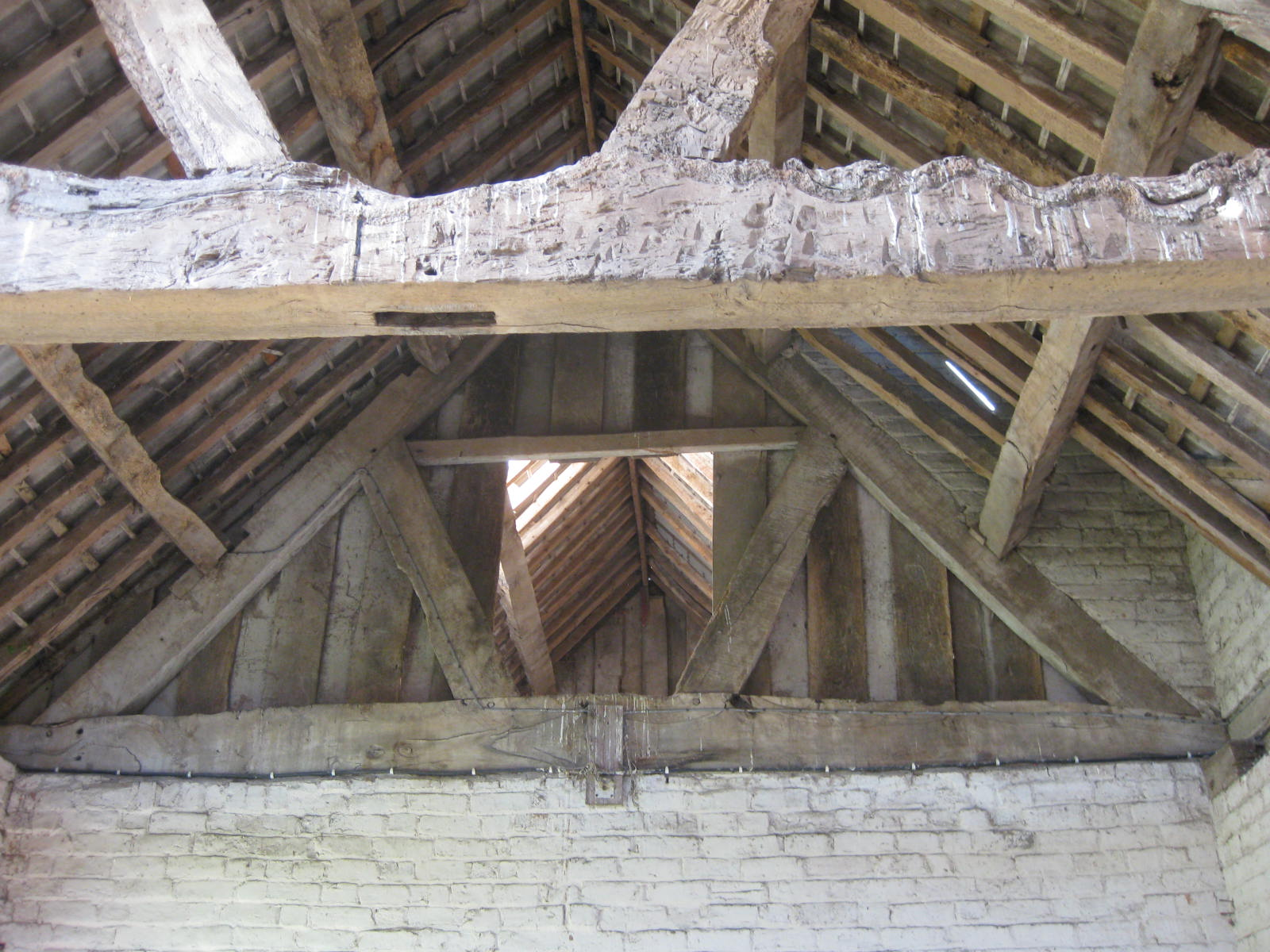
Roof of hay barn with grain store above

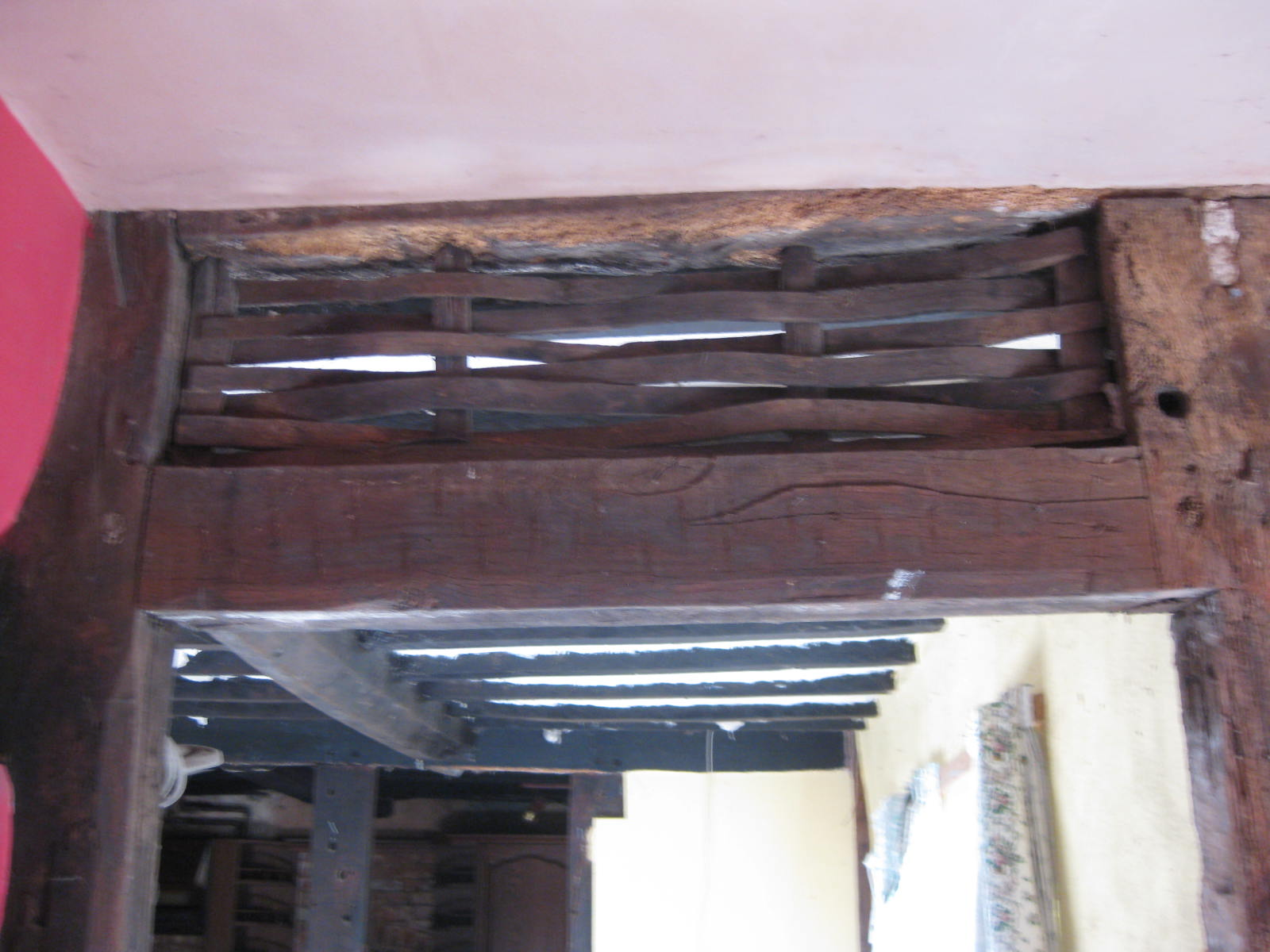
Upper Pengelli farmhouse dooframe off lobby with wattle above.

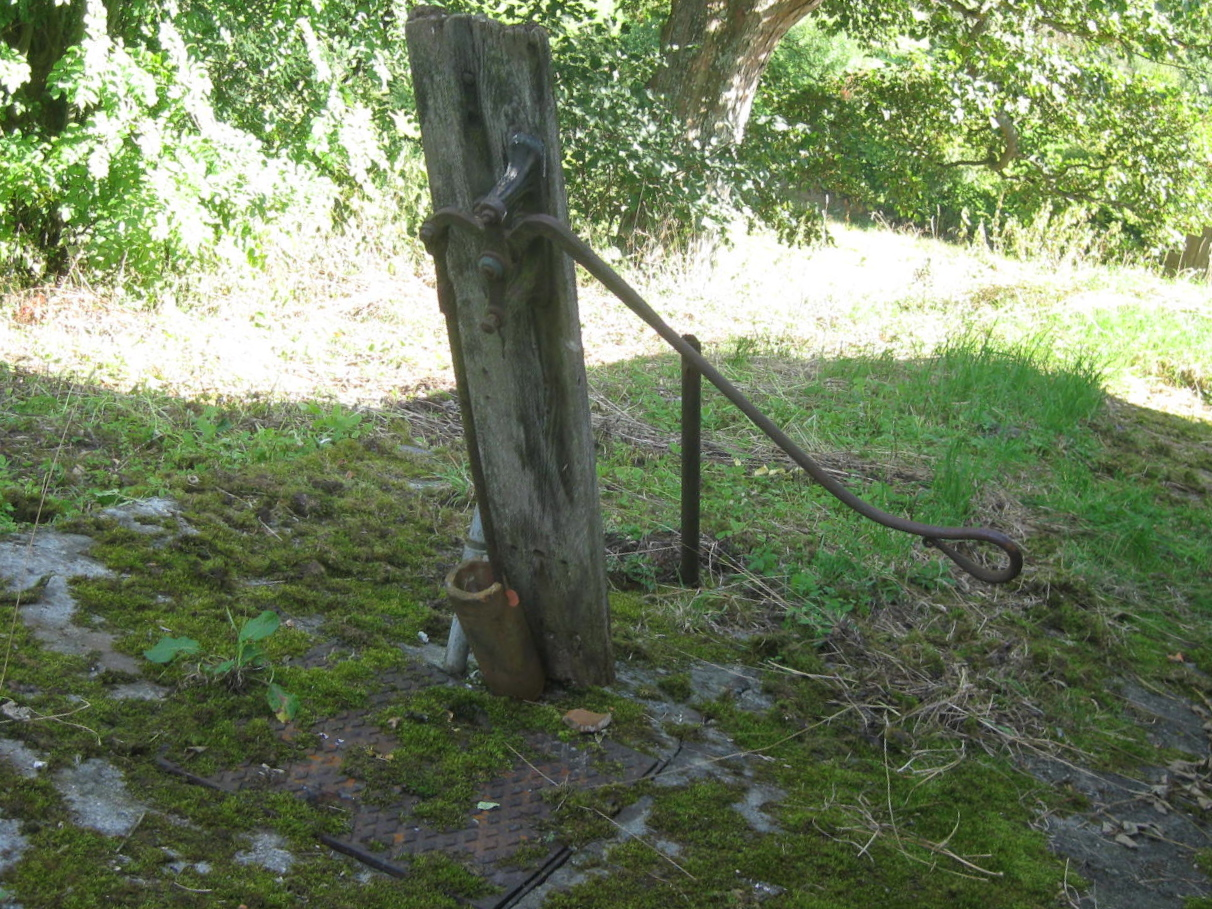
Upper Pengelli, Old farmhouse pump.

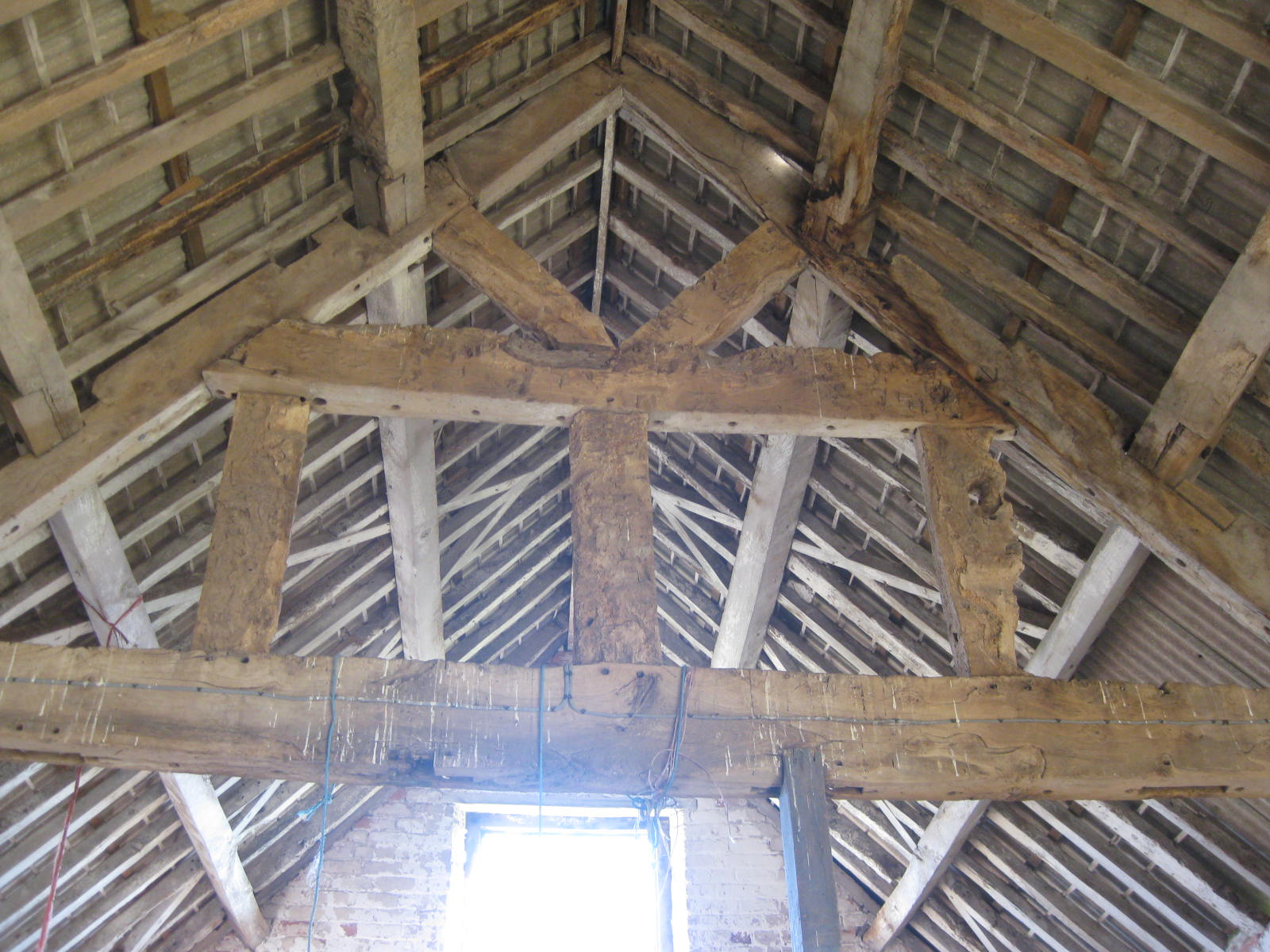
Roof truss in hay barn-reused from an earlier building

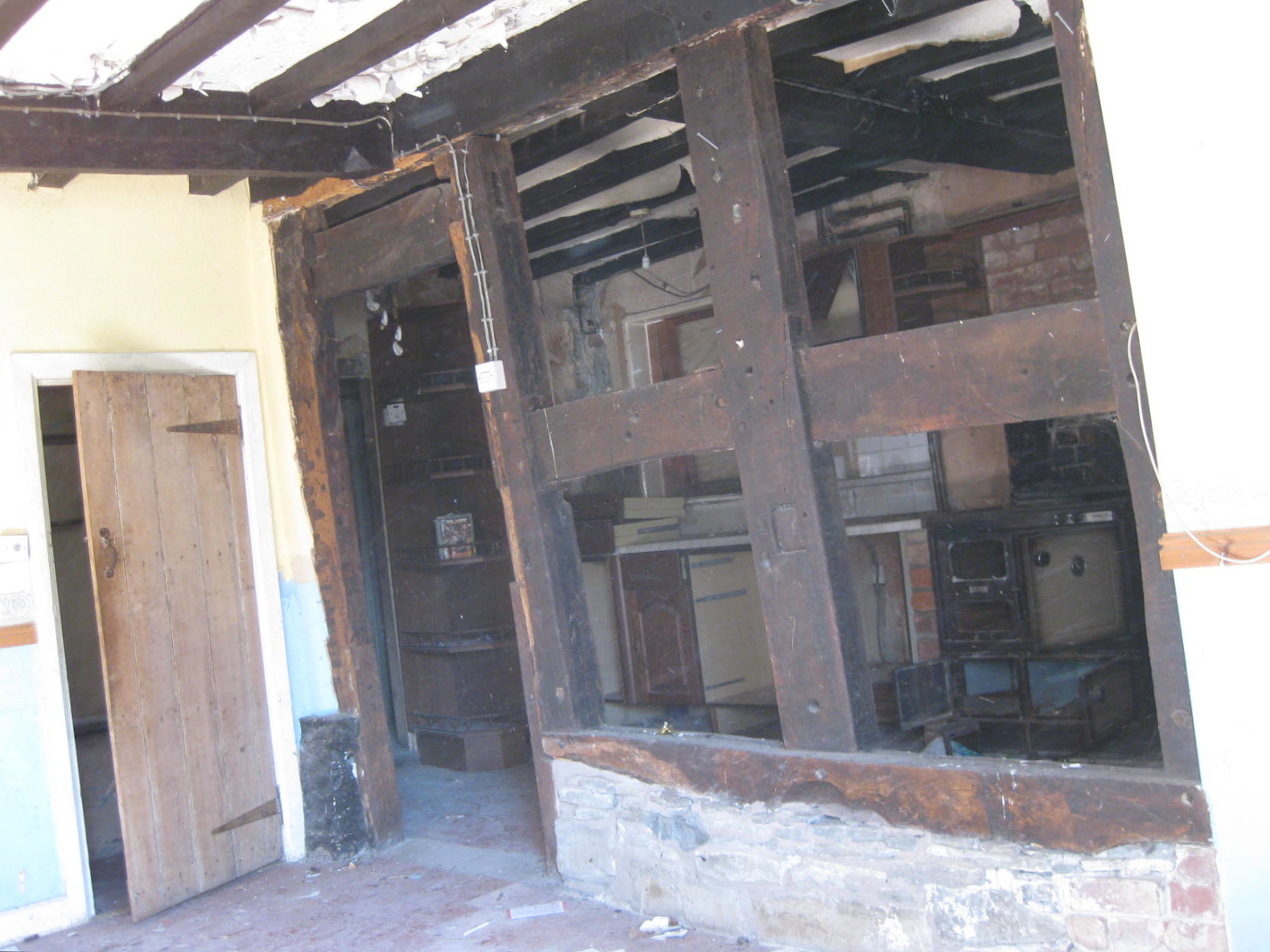
Upper Pengelli, timber framing in house.

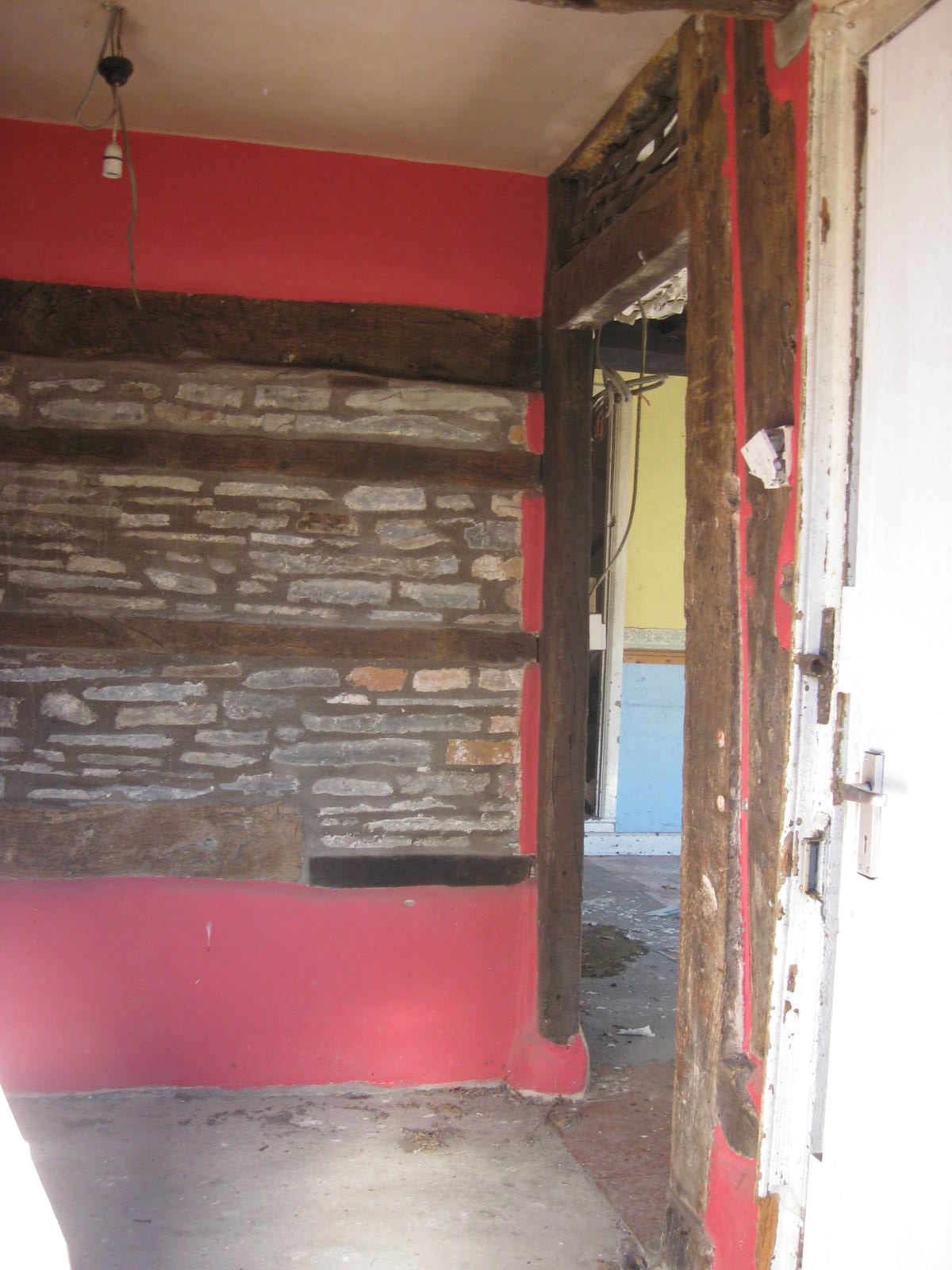
Lobby entrance to Upper Pengelli Farmhouse
