= St Anno's Church, Llananno =

- Church of St Anno, Llananno
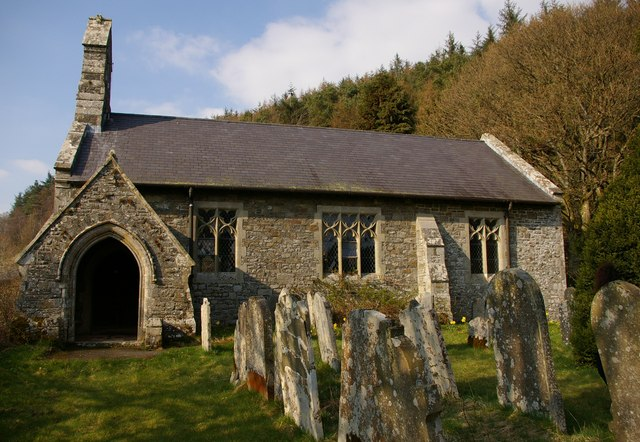
- "among the finest pieces of medieval screenwork in Wales"

- Location in Powys
- 52.3597°N 3.3294°W
- Location: Llananno, Powys
- Country: Wales
- Denomination: Church in Wales

History
- Status: Redundant
- Founded: 14th century
- Dedication: Saint Anno

Architecture
- Heritage designation: Grade II*
- Designated: 29 July 2004
- Architectural type: Church

Specifications
- Materials: Stone, slate roof

The Church of St Anno in Llananno, Powys, Wales, is a redundant church dating from the 14th century. Its medieval rood screen is considered "one of the great treasures of Welsh craftsmanship". A Grade II* listed building, the church is now in the care of the Friends of Friendless Churches.

== History and description ==
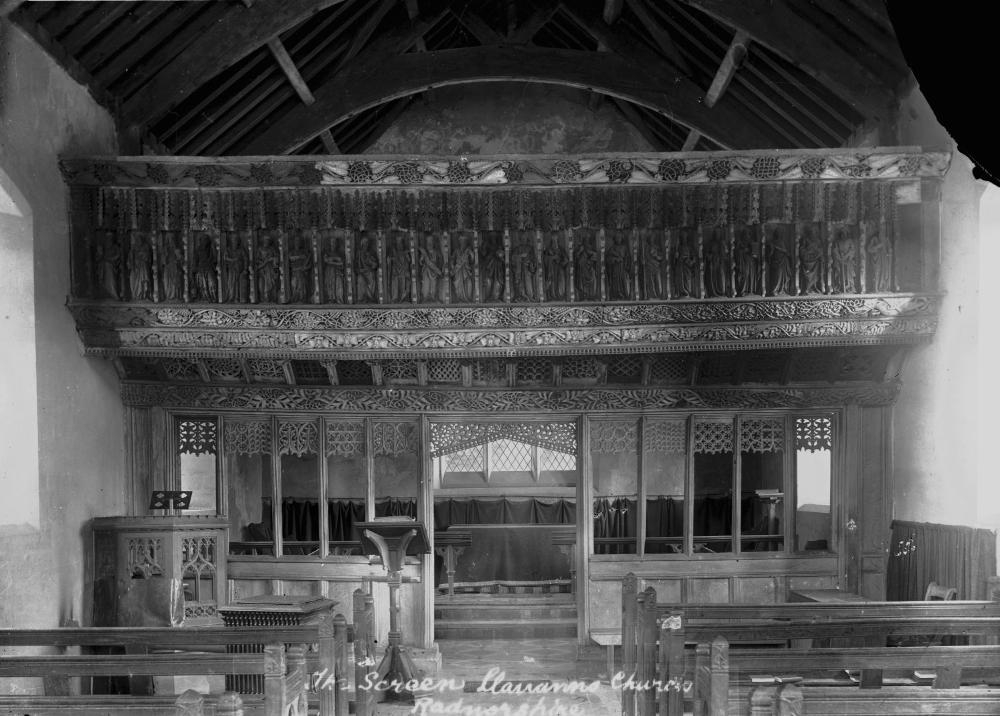
The rood screen

The Church of St Anno stands beside the River Ithon on the edge of the village of Llananno. Of medieval origin, it was entirely rebuilt in 1876–1877 by David Walker, a Liverpool-based architect. Walker incorporated elements from the medieval church, including the 15th-century rood screen. Cadw considers the screen as "the most richly decorated and one of the most complete in Wales". Scourfield and Haslam, in their Powys volume of the Buildings of Wales describe the "glorious [screen as] among the best examples of screen-work in Wales”, and the best of the work of the Newton school of Welsh screen-carvers, and draw comparisons with similar screens at Newton itself, at Llanegryn, Gwynedd, and at Daresbury, Cheshire. The screen was restored during the Walker restoration, and again in the 1960s. It comprises ten arches, with a centrally-placed archway, which support a large gallery with two bressummers (beams) above and below a central parapet carved with 25 figures of "Christ, Patriarchs, Kings and Prophets". The figures are 19th-century replacements. The bressummers themselves are carved with images of "fruit and foliage, the stems emerging from the mouths of serpents".

The church itself is small and simple, constructed of grey limestone with a porch and modest bell cote. St Anno's is a Grade II* listed building, its Cadw record noting that the high grading is due to "its exceptional rood screen, an architectural survival of national importance".

== Sources ==
- Jenkins, Simon (2008). Wales: Churches, Houses, Castles. London: Penguin. ISBN 978-0-713-99893-1.
- Scourfield, Robert; Richard, Haslam (2013). Powys: Montgomeryshire, Radnorshire and Breconshire. The Buildings of Wales. New Haven and London: Yale University Press. ISBN 978-0-300-18508-9. OCLC 935421607.
