= Kerry Hill sheep =

Breed of sheep

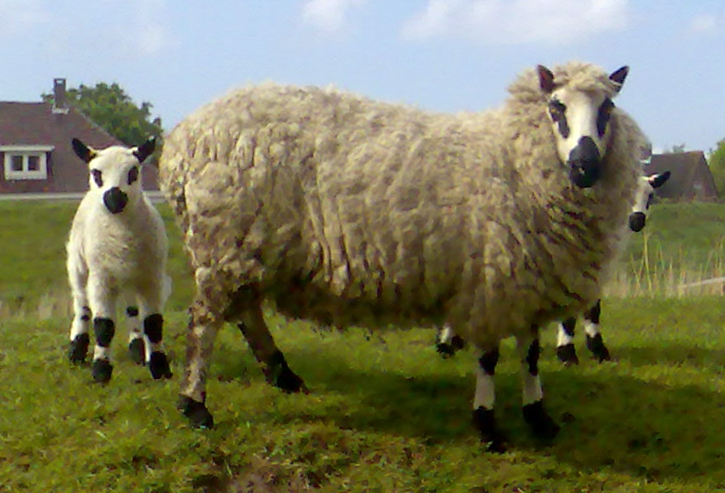
Kerry Hill sheep

The Kerry Hill (Welsh: Dafad Bryniau Ceri) is a breed of domestic sheep originating in the county of Powys in Wales. It derives its name from the village of Kerry (Ceri), near Newtown. Kerry Hill sheep have a distinctive and unique coloration, with a white face bearing black markings around the mouth, ears, and eyes. Both rams and ewes are polled. Their wool is white, and their legs are white with black markings. First mentions of the breed date back to the early 19th century, and today it is distributed throughout the United Kingdom, Ireland, the Netherlands, Germany and Denmark. Though still not very numerous, the breed was removed from the records of the Rare Breeds Survival Trust watchlist in 2006. This breed is primarily raised for meat.

The Kerry Hill Flock Book Society keeps a register of pure bred animals and provides information on the breed, shows and sales.

== Characteristics ==
The Kerry Hill is a medium-sized breed of sturdy build, an average ewe weighing about 55 to 65 kg (121 to 143 lb) and a ram a little more.. The face is white with black markings on the nose and around the eyes, with black, wool-less ears set high on the head. The legs are white with black markings. The fleece is fine and white, with a Bradford count of 54 to 56 and a staple length of 10 cm (4 in). An average fleece weighs about 2.75 kg (6.1 lb).

The lambing percentage is often 175% and a terminal sire can be used for a larger carcase. The ewes milk well and the lambs grow fast. They can produce a 16 kg (35 lb) carcase at twelve to fourteen weeks, or if overwintered, a 20 to 25 kg (44 to 55 lb) carcase the following spring.

== Literature ==
- Williams-Davies J (1981/1987), Welsh Sheep and their Wool. Gomer, Llandysul pp.39-42.
