= Llanbadarn Fynydd =

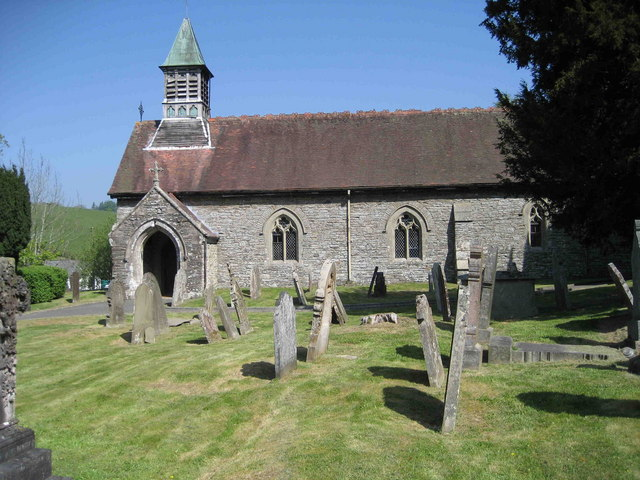

- Location within Powys
- Population: 306
- OS grid reference: SO 0980 7775
  - Cardiff: 63.2 mi (101.7 km)
  - London: 149.3 mi (240.3 km)
- Community: Llanbadarn Fynydd
- Principal area: Powys
- Country: Wales
- Sovereign state: United Kingdom
- Post town: Llandrindod Wells
- Postcode district: LD1
- Police: Dyfed-Powys
- Fire: Mid and West Wales
- Ambulance: Welsh
- UK Parliament: Brecon, Radnor and Cwm Tawe
- Senedd Cymru – Welsh Parliament: Brecon and Radnorshire
- List of places UK Wales Powys 52.390302°N 3.326792°W Community map: Map of the community

Llanbadarn Fynydd (Welsh for 'church of Padarn in the mountain') is a village and community in Radnorshire, Powys, Wales, and is 63 miles (101 km) from Cardiff and 149 miles (240 km) from London.

The name "Llanbadarn Fynydd" means "Church of Padarn in the Mountain". The community includes the villages of Llanbadarn Fynydd, Llananno and Llaithddu. In 2011 the population of Llanbadarn Fynydd was 306 with 8.8% of them able to speak Welsh. In 1513, the St. David's Episcopal Registers refer to the location as "Llanbadarn Vynith". Castell y Blaidd Medieval Settlement lies nearby as well as Coventry Round Barrow and Moel Dod Round Barrow.

The New Inn is a former 17th-century coaching inn, now a family-run pub and restaurant.

It lies on the A483 road which runs from Swansea to Chester.

== See also ==
- List of localities in Wales by population
