= The Mule (river) =

River in Powys, Wales

Coordinates: 52.5056°N 3.2101°W

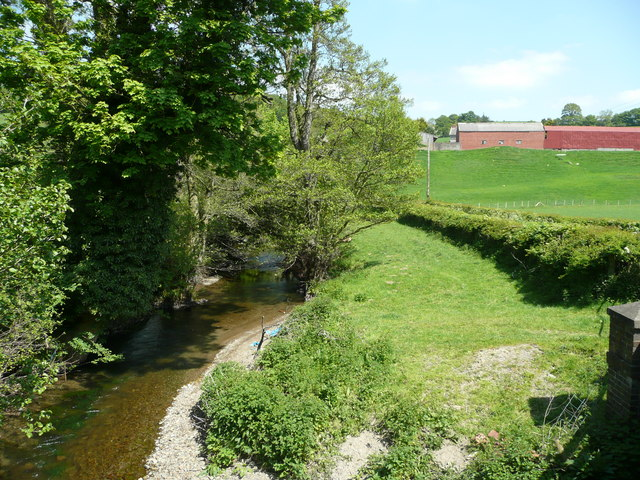
- Native name: Afon Miwl (Welsh)

Location
- Country: Wales
- Region: Powys

Physical characteristics
- Mouth
  - location: River Severn, Abermule

The Mule (Welsh: Afon Miwl) is a short river in Powys, mid Wales, and a tributary of the River Severn. It rises at Black Gate near the west end of Kerry Hill and is joined by a number of streams, principal amongst which is the Nant Meheli, east of Kerry. Initially flowing northeast it turns to flow east at Kerry and then northwest, entering a narrow section of valley near Llanmerewig before joining the Severn at Abermule (Welsh: Aber-miwl meaning 'mouth of the Mule').
