= Dolfor =

Coordinates: 52.474°N 3.318°W

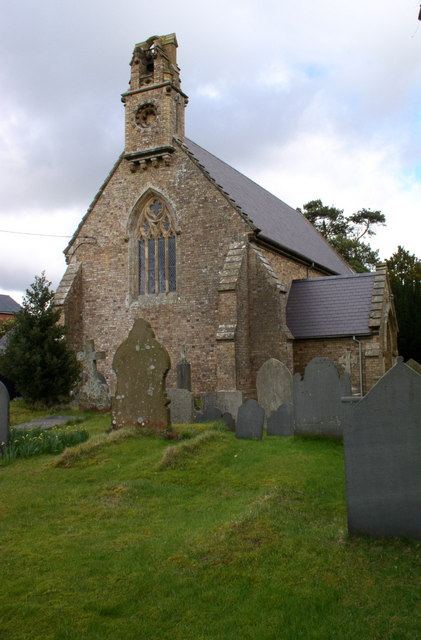
The church of Saint Paul, Dolfor

Dolfor is a small hamlet in the north of Powys, Wales. It is located about three miles to the south of Newtown, at the junction of the B4355 and A483 roads. It is in the historic county of Montgomeryshire

The source of the Afon Miwl is near the village. The church in the village is dedicated to Saint Paul.
