= Llananno =

Village in Powys, Wales

Coordinates: 52.370°N 3.337°W

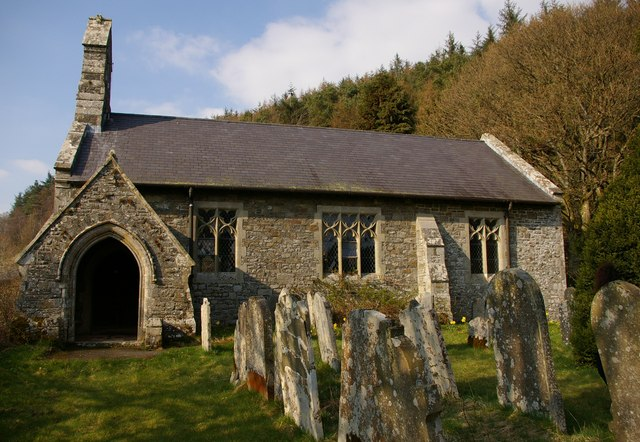
- St Anno's Church

- Location within Powys
- Community: Llanbadarn Fynydd
- Principal area: Powys
- Preserved county: Powys
- Country: Wales
- Sovereign state: United Kingdom
- Police: Dyfed-Powys
- Fire: Mid and West Wales
- Ambulance: Welsh
- UK Parliament: Brecon, Radnor and Cwm Tawe
- Senedd Cymru – Welsh Parliament: Brecon and Radnorshire

Llananno is a village and former parish on the River Ithon, in the community of Llanbadarn Fynydd, Powys. The parish church was St Anno's Church; this is now a redundant church. In 1983 Llananno was abolished as a community.

The church in Newborough on Anglesey was once also dedicated to St Anno (also spelt Ano), in fact Newborough was anciently known by the name Llananno. Nothing more is known about St Anno.
