= Arddleen railway station =

Disused railway station in Arddlin, Powys

Coordinates: 52.73491°N 3.09525°W

Arddleen
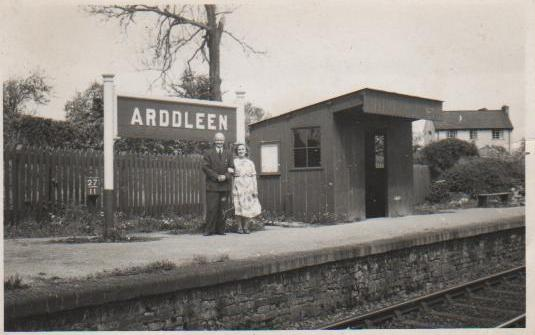
- The station with passengers, circa 1958

General information
- Location: Arddlin, Powys; Wales
- Platforms: 1

Other information
- Status: Disused

History
- Original company: Oswestry and Newtown Railway
- Pre-grouping: Cambrian Railways
- Post-grouping: Great Western Railway

Key dates
- February 1862: Opened as Arddleen
- 14 June 1954: Renamed Arddleen Halt
- 18 January 1965: Closed
Location

Arddleen railway station served the village of Arddlin in Powys, Wales, sited on the former Cambrian Railways between Oswestry and Welshpool. Served by the Oswestry and Newtown railway, it was situated near the English border.

== History ==
Although the Cambrian main line through Arddleen was opened for service on 1 May 1860, Arddleen station did not come fully into service until 1863. The line was built by the Oswestry and Newtown Railway, then absorbed into the Cambrian Railways, and it became part of the Great Western Railway during the Grouping of 1923. The line then passed to the Western Region of British Railways on nationalisation in 1948. Arddleen was reclassified as a Halt in June 1954 when the original station building, which incorporated a small booking office and waiting room, was replaced by a simple wooden shelter. In the same year the platform may have been rebuilt showing the fancy stone facing on the platform frontage.

Situated between Four Crosses and Pool Quay, the Halt came under the control of the Station Master at Four Crosses. Arddleen Halt was 154 ft in length and was sited on the up side of the single running line. The platform was constructed of fabricated stone block, in-filled and laid with a tarmac surface.

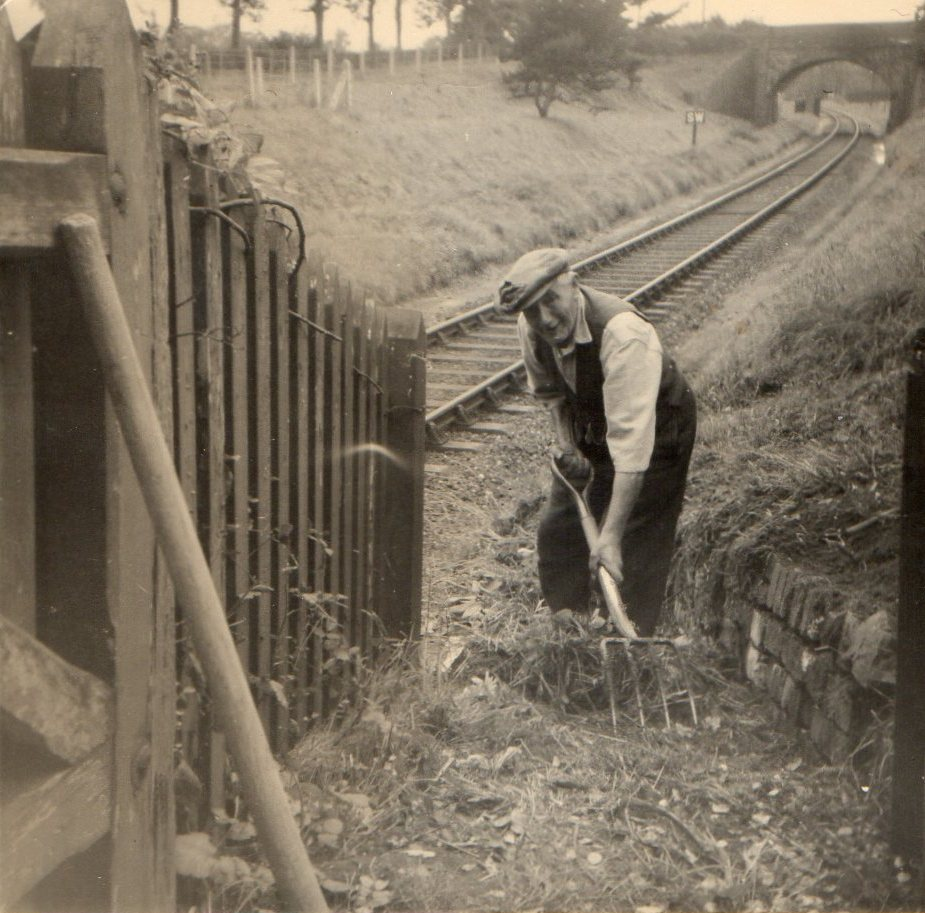
Arddleen Station showing now demolished bridge towards Pool Quay

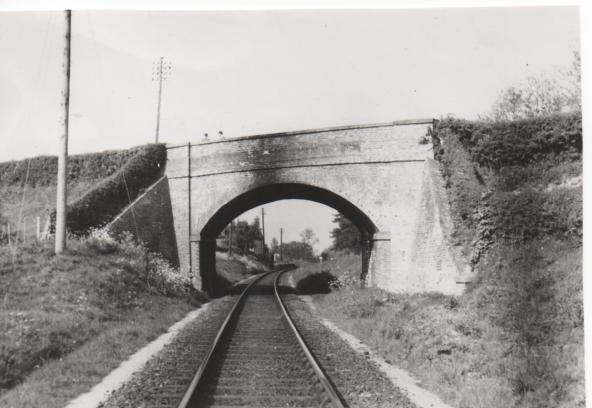
Arddleen Railway Road bridge now demolished

Access to the halt was from a small lane that ran parallel to the towpath of the Montgomeryshire Canal and the railway. A stone built house stood adjacent to the railway and was called Station House, but with no railway architectural features it bore no original connection to the railway; instead it was connected with the canal which was opened in 1821, having been authorised as early as 1794. The house was however used as family accommodation for railway personnel from the opening of the railway until its closure in 1965. It is known that until the early part of the 20th century there was a Station Master resident in the house. Under the GWR Directive 'Halts Where Staff are Not Employed', it was the responsibility of the Station Master at Four Crosses in later years to visit the halts which were under his supervision to see that the premises were in proper condition and that notice boards, gates, lamps and shelters etc. were properly looked after. In later years there were very few scheduled stops at Arddleen, although request stops were generally possible. There was almost an hourly service between Welshpool and Oswestry but only one or two of these trains were timetabled to stop at Arddleen. Some trains only stopped on a few specific days of the week. Arddleen Station (Halt) was closed to passengers on 18 January 1965 by the British Railways Board as part of the closure of the section from Oswestry to Buttington Junction.

== The site today ==
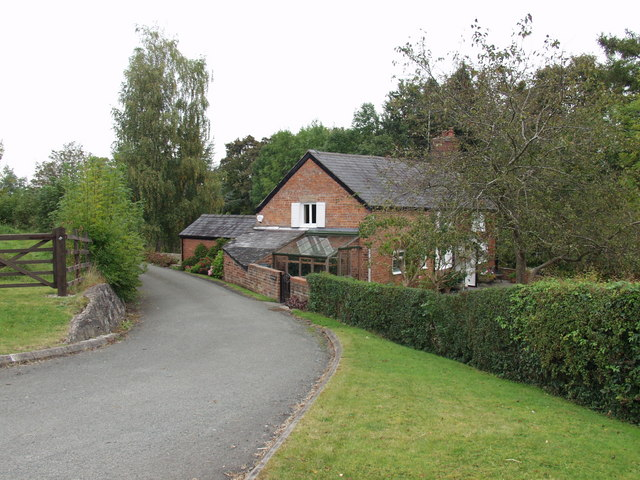
The station house at Arddleen

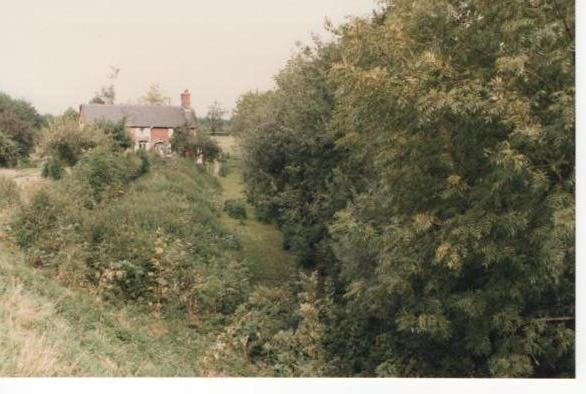
The station in 1981

The single platform and adjacent original Station House (now a private dwelling) remain on the site. The Station House has no railway architectural features, and probably pre-dates the building of the railway, probably being related originally to the Montgomeryshire Canal which runs alongside. The railway bridge just beyond the station, looking towards Pool Quay, was demolished and the cutting filled in during the 1980s as part of the straightening of the A483 road towards Welshpool. The canal bridge at the entrance to the station access lane was also demolished at that time.

== Sources ==
- Butt, R. V. J. (October 1995). The Directory of Railway Stations: details every public and private passenger station, halt, platform and stopping place, past and present (1st ed.). Sparkford: Patrick Stephens Ltd. ISBN 978-1-85260-508-7. OCLC 60251199. OL 11956311M.
- A. Jowett (2000). Jowett's Nationalised Railway Atlas. Atlantic Publishing. ISBN 0-906899-99-0

Preceding station	Disused railways	Following station
Pool Quay; Line and station closed	Cambrian Railways; Oswestry and Newtown Railway	Four Crosses; Line and station closed
