= Four Crosses =

Four Crosses is the name of several places:

- Four Crosses, Denbighshire, Wales
- Four Crosses, Flintshire, Wales
- Four Crosses, Isle of Anglesey, Wales
- Four Crosses, Llandysilio, Montgomeryshire, Powys, Wales
  - Four Crosses F.C., their association football club (soccer team)
  - Four Crosses railway station
- Four Crosses, Staffordshire, England
- Four Crosses, Wrexham, Wales
