= Oswestry and Newtown Railway =

UK railway company

The Oswestry and Newtown Railway (O&NR) was a British railway company that built a line between Oswestry in Shropshire and Newtown Montgomeryshire, now Powys. The line opened in stages in 1860 and 1861. It was conceived to open up the area to rail transport, when local opinion formed the view that the trunk railway companies would not do so. Subscription money for the construction proved very difficult to generate. It was the action of a contractor partnership, Davies and Savin, in agreeing to accept shares as the majority of their payment for construction work, that saved the company from failure.

Forming a local network with other local concerns, the O&NR amalgamated with them, forming the Cambrian Railways, in 1863. The industry in the area was not buoyant and hoped-for long-distance traffic did not materialise, although the development of Aberystwyth as a resort provided a useful benefit. The railway connected to the emerging national network at Oswestry, but the later connection of the Shrewsbury and Welshpool Railway abstracted traffic from the northern part of the system. A grim event took place in 1921 near Abermule, when there was a head-on collision on the single line, due to slack operating disciplines. The collision resulted in seventeen deaths.

As social and travel habits changed in the 1960s, the line's remaining core income was badly reduced, and for a time widespread closure was a possibility. In fact the Shrewsbury connection to Aberystwyth and the coastal line to Pwllheli were retained, but the section from Oswestry to Buttington closed in 1965. The main line from Buttington to Newtown continues in use as part of a passenger connection to Aberystwyth and the coast.

== Conception ==
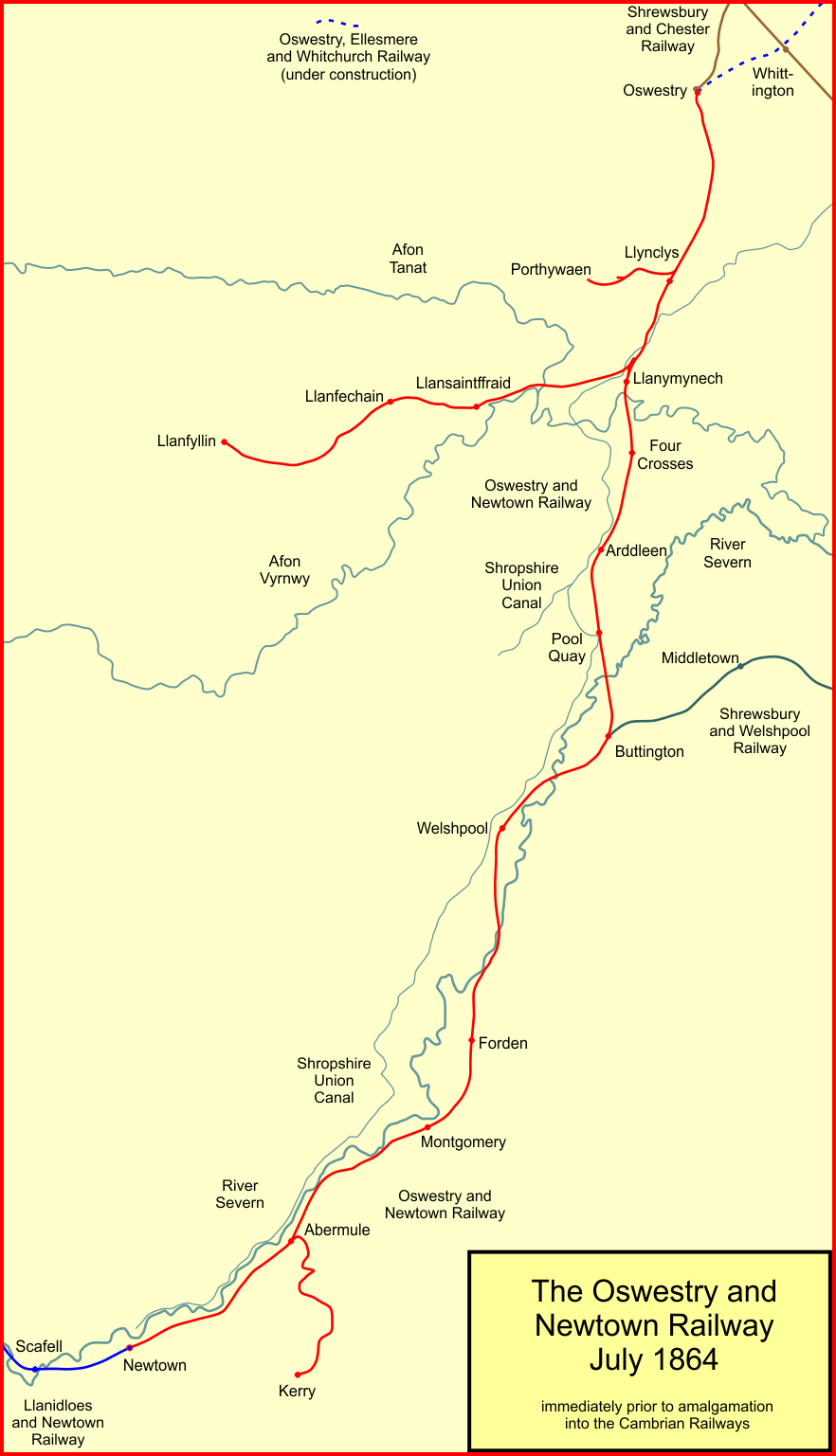
The Oswestry and Newtown Railway

The Shrewsbury and Chester Railway (S&CR) opened in two stages, in 1846 and 1848. Its route passed through Gobowen and there was a branch from Gobowen to Oswestry, which opened in 1848. On 1 September 1854 the Great Western Railway (GWR) acquired the S&CR, furthering its strategy of making a through link from London to Merseyside. The eastern border of Wales was therefore secured to the GWR, while the north Wales coast was controlled by the London and North Western Railway (LNWR), which approached from Crewe. Both these companies looked toward the interior of mid Wales, and were rivals of one another.

Newtown and Llanidloes were important centres of flannel manufacture; Welshpool too was involved, although it was much less important, and declining. It was well understood that an industry operating in a location remote from its market needed a railway connection. For a time in the 1830s it had appeared that a trunk railway would be built through the area, but this plan fell through. In 1852 a Montgomeryshire Railways Company was proposed, sponsored by the LNWR, but the LNWR changed the route and then cancelled the scheme. In frustration local people promoted a Llanidloes and Newtown Railway, which received its authorising act of Parliament, the Llanidloes and Newtown Railways Act 1853 (16 & 17 Vict. c. cxliii); however the line was not planned to connect to any existing railway.

Oswestry, Welchpool and Newtown Railway Act 1855
- Act of Parliament
- Parliament of the United Kingdom
- Long title: An Act for making a Railway from Oswestry in the County of Salop to Welchpool and Newtown in the County of Montgomery.
- Citation: 18 & 19 Vict. c. lxxxvi

Dates
- Royal assent: 26 June 1855

Text of statute as originally enacted

Plainly an isolated railway was of limited value, and a railway from Oswestry to Newtown was promoted in 1854. It was submitted to Parliament as the Oswestry, Welchpool and Newtown Railway [sic], but the reference to Welshpool was generally omitted subsequently, and the company was referred to as the Oswestry and Newtown Railway. It was authorised by the Oswestry, Welchpool and Newtown Railway Act 1855 (18 & 19 Vict. c. lxxxv) of 26 June 1855, with capital of £250,000. The connection to the national railway network at Oswestry led to the O&NR being allied to the Great Western Railway.

== Construction ==
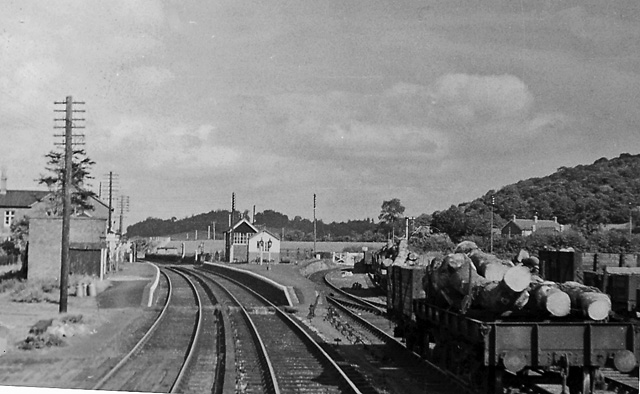
Abermule station

Contractors had been appointed before the Oswestry, Welchpool and Newtown Railway Act 1855 (18 & 19 Vict. c. lxxxv) was granted, but for some time there was no money to pay them. Over two years after the granting act another firm of contractors was appointed. The O&NR found the raising of share subscriptions to be extremely difficult, and negotiations to obtain land were continually frustrating. Ann Owen, owner of an estate at Glansevern, near Berriew, now refused to permit the line to pass near the estate: the route had to be diverted to the eastern bank of the River Severn. In addition, there were disagreements between the company, the GWR and Oswestry Town Council about the location of a joint station there. In early 1858 the contractors, Davidson & Oughterson, became bankrupt; only 11 of 30 miles (18 of 48 km) of the line had been started.

The directors negotiated with a partnership of local contractors, David Davies and Thomas Savin, and they took over the contract. This proved to be a turning point, as Davies and Savin reinvigorated the construction process. The company was heavily indebted, but Davies and Savin paid off £45,000 to get work on the line restarted. They agreed to complete the line in exchange for unissued preference shares and debentures and earnings up to 1 January 1861. In fact the first work undertaken by Davies and Savin was the doubling of the section between Buttington Junction and Welshpool, started on 30 October 1859. This had been urged by the London and North Western Railway, which planned a connection to the line at Buttington, and the O&NR was anxious to keep the LNWR on side. The LNWR had been contemplating building its own parallel route, but now that it could see that the O&NR was taking realistic steps, it acquiesced in accepting running powers to Welshpool over the O&NR, for which it paid £25,000, as well as half the maintenance costs of Welshpool station.

== Opening ==
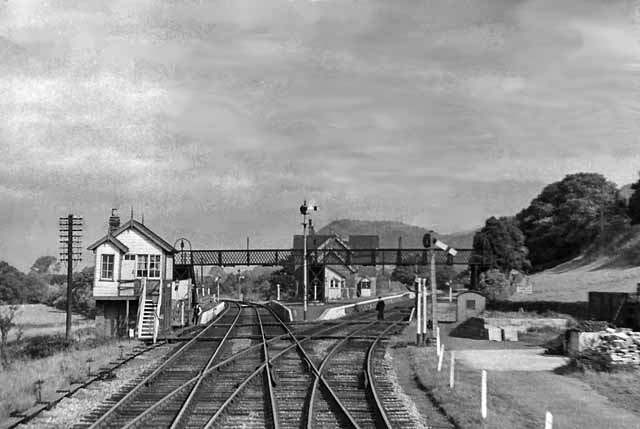
Buttington railway station

The first sixteen miles from Oswestry to Pool Quay was opened on 1 May 1860, as a single line on double-line formation. Two more sections were opened on 14 August 1860: from Pool Quay to Welshpool, and an isolated five-mile stretch from Abermule to Newtown, where a joint station was made with the Llanidloes and Newtown Railway. Abermule to Welshpool opened on 10 June 1861. By this time there had been a serious rupture in the partnership between Davies and Savin, and it was the latter who undertook the working of trains on the O&NR; he did so by agreement of 26 July 1861, for 55% of gross receipts.

The Shrewsbury and Welshpool Railway (S&WR), sponsored at first by the LNWR, was opened throughout on 27 January 1862. This formed a shorter route from Newtown to the Midlands and London, and abstracted traffic from the O&NR. The S&WR was worked by the LNWR, and the GWR had running powers; in 1865 the two larger companies took ownership control of the line jointly.

== Branch lines ==
=== Porthywaen branch ===
Oswestry and Newtown Railway Act 1860
- Act of Parliament
- Parliament of the United Kingdom
- Long title: An Act for enabling the Oswestry and Newtown Railway Company to raise additional Capital, to lease their Undertaking; and for other Purposes.
- Citation: 23 & 24 Vict. c. ci

Dates
- Royal assent: 3 July 1860

Oswestry and Newtown Railway (Porthywaen Branch) Act 1860
- Act of Parliament
- Parliament of the United Kingdom
- Long title: An Act for making a Branch Railway from the Oswestry and Newtown Railway at Llynellys to the Porthywaen Lime Rocks in the County of Salop.
- Citation: 23 & 24 Vict. c. cxxxix

Dates
- Royal assent: 3 July 1860

The Porthywaen branch was authorised by the Oswestry and Newtown Railway (Porthywaen Branch) Act 1860 (23 & 24 Vict. c. cxxxix) of 3 July 1860; it was opened on 1 May 1861. It was a short mineral line from near Llynclys station, to quarries at Porthywaen and Whitehaven, operated by T. and J. Savin. It had a maximum gradient of 1 in 63, and ran alongside the Crickheath Tramway. There was a branch from the Porthywaen line to Savin's New British Coal Pit at Coed-y-go; this was built privately by the Savin Brothers, opening on 31 March 1863. About twenty coal wagons were worked daily each way until the pit closed in 1869.

=== Kerry branch ===
Oswestry and Newton Railway (Llanfyllin and Kerry Branches) Act 1861
- Act of Parliament
- Parliament of the United Kingdom
- Long title: An Act to enable the Oswestry and Newtown Railway Company to construct additional Lines of Railway to Llanfyllin and Kerry in the County of Montgomery; and for other Purposes.
- Citation: 24 & 25 Vict. c. xvii

Dates
- Royal assent: 17 May 1861

Oswestry and Newtown Railway Act 1863
- Act of Parliament
- Parliament of the United Kingdom
- Long title: An Act for authorizing the Oswestry and Newtown Railway Company to make a Branch to Aberbechan, and to raise additional Capital; and for other Purposes.
- Citation: 26 & 27 Vict. c. xcvi

Dates
- Royal assent: 29 June 1863

Text of statute as originally enacted

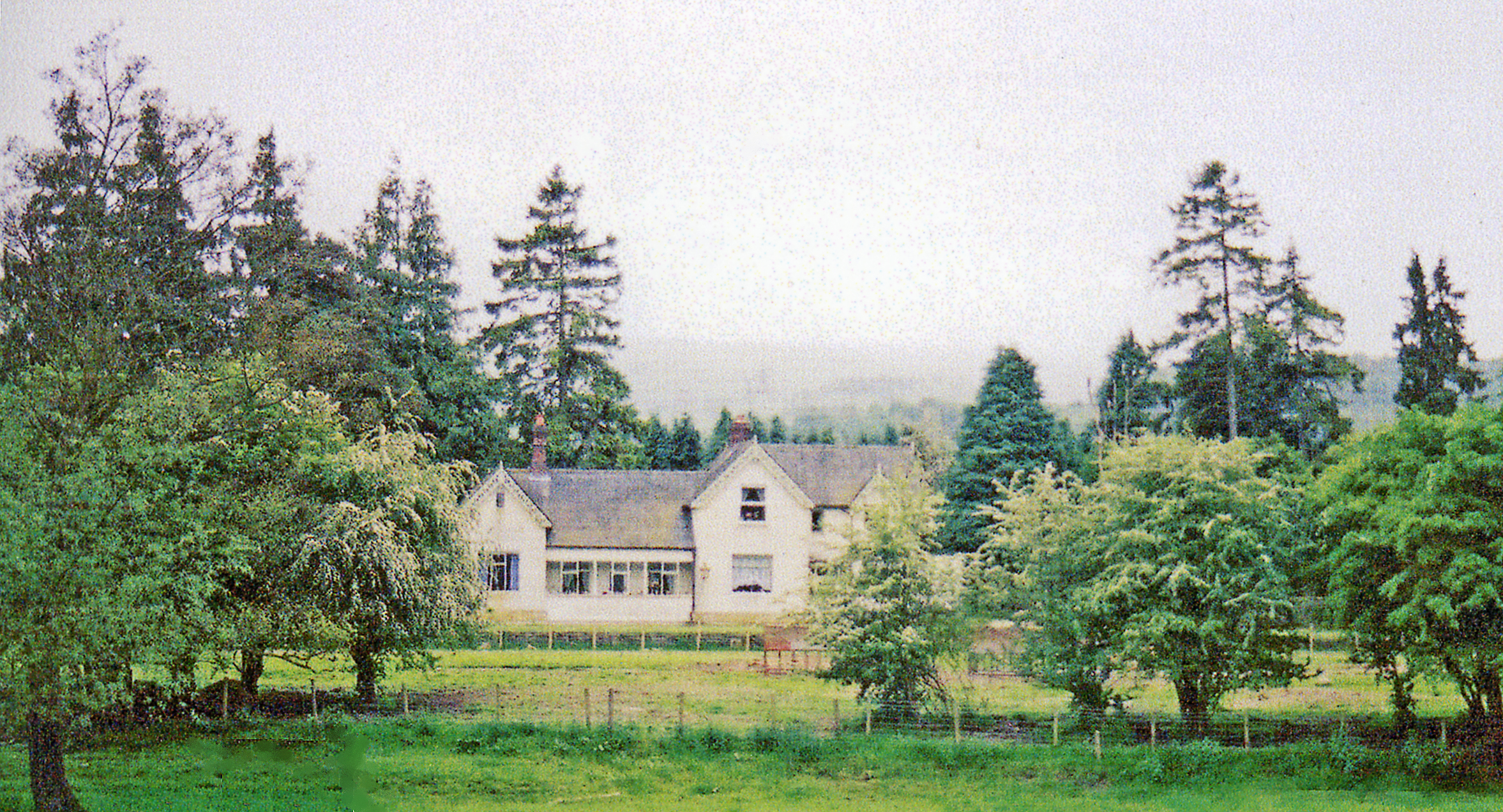
Former Kerry station building

The next branch to open was the Kerry branch; it had been authorised by the Oswestry and Newton Railway (Llanfyllin and Kerry Branches) Act 1861 (24 & 25 Vict. c. xvii) on 17 May 1861. It ran just under four miles through the Mule Gorge in the hills from Abermule. It was built largely on the initiative of a prosperous farmer, John Wilkes. He agitated strongly for a line to serve the hills as the O&NR was under construction and, on 26 September 1861, Savin agreed to build the branch on the same terms as the main line. Money for the construction of the branch was always short. Once the line opened, business was in short supply also, and after three years the situation got so critical that it went before the O&NR board on 24 December 1866, with a view to deciding whether to close the branch. In fact a decision was put off, and the branch continued in operation. Later a general improvement in trade brought more traffic to the branch.

The line climbed steeply from Abermule, on the main line, to a terminus about 1 mile (1.6 km) short of Kerry village. There was a siding at Middle Mill, near Abermule, and much later the Great Western Railway had taken over and built halts, without buildings, at Ffronfraith and Goitre in 1923. The line included 1,467 yards (1,341 m) of incline at a gradient of 1 in 43; this became the steepest standard gauge gradient on which the Cambrian worked passenger trains. Kerry had a station with a long single platform and cottage-type buildings. There was no intermediate loop on the single line. From 1888 a narrow-gauge tramway continued from Kerry station, engaged with the timber trade. The passenger service had consisted of seven trains per day each way at its peak, but it was discontinued in 1931.

=== Llanfyllin branch ===
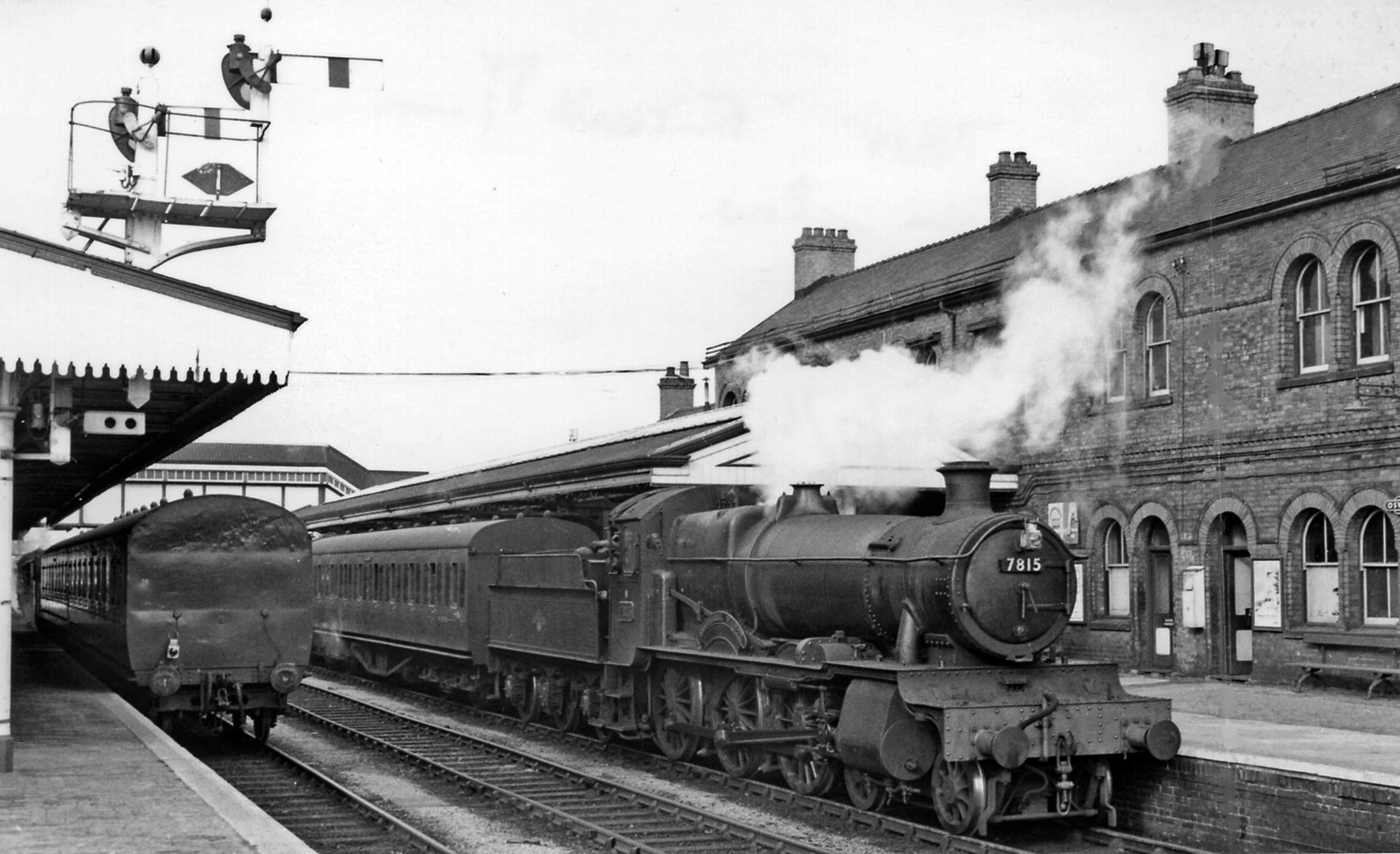
Oswestry railway station

There were many small communities in isolated locations in the general area, and in the Llanfyllin area, a solicitor named John Pugh focussed pressure on the company to provide a branch line. The O&NR arranged a meeting at Llanfyllin in 1860 to discuss a branch from Llanymynech. This was agreed upon; it would cost about £60,000. The O&NR decided to get powers for a branch, and also for a line to Llanymynech Lime Rocks, provided subscriptions were forthcoming locally. The Oswestry and Newton Railway (Llanfyllin and Kerry Branches) Act 1861 (24 & 25 Vict. c. xvii) was obtained on 17 May 1861. The following July, Benjamin Piercy (as engineer) started planning the route and also that to Kerry, and two months later Savin agreed to build the line.

The first sod of the branch was cut at Llwyn, near Llanfyllin, on 20 September 1861, and Savin, then in partnership with his brother-in-law John Ward, quickly built the line. The 9 1/4 miles (14.9 km) were straightforward to construct, but the gradients were steep. Leaving Llanymynech, the line had to climb to cross the nearby Shropshire Union Canal; trains used a short bay at the north end of the station, and were propelled to a reversing siding alongside the main line but at a higher level. After reversing, they crossed the canal and continued alongside Rock Siding, which served lime kilns. Further on, the branch crossed two of the narrow-gauge tramways from Llanymynech Hill to the canal and also the Nantmawr branch. The first trains ran on 10 April 1863 and there were occasional workings prior to the official opening excursion on 17 July. This was a 23-coach special run to Borth, which gave many of the 600 passengers from the hilly valley their first view of the sea.

Llansantffraid was the only intermediate station in O&NR days. Another was planned at Llanfechain but difficulties in getting possession of the land delayed opening of the station until January 1866, followed a month later by one at Brongwyn (later Bryngwyn). It was unstaffed, and passengers operated a signal if they wanted a train to stop. There was one intermediate loop at Llansantffraid.

Although passenger traffic hardly developed, there was a boost in heavy goods traffic when Liverpool Corporation decided to build a big reservoir at Lake Vyrnwy about 1880. In February 1881, the corporation proposed to construct a narrow-gauge tramway alongside the road to bring in construction materials, but this was not done. When work on the dam started in June 1881, cement for the dam and pipes for the aqueduct to Liverpool were shipped to Aberdovey and conveyed by rail to Llanfyllin, and taken onward by horse and cart transport. A new siding and storage shed was provided at Llanfyllin, and stables for 95 horses were set up in the station yard. When the lake was eventually completed on 16 March 1910 it was the biggest in Wales.

The awkward access to the branch, involving reversal in a headshunt at Llanymynech, was simplified on 27 January 1896 when a 1/2-mile (0.8 km) spur was opened; this connected the Llanfyllin branch to the Nantmawr branch of the Potteries, Shrewsbury and North Wales Railway. This branch line entered Llanymynech directly from the south; it had been built about 1866 and operated passenger trains from 1870. It closed in 1880 when the Potteries Railway failed, but the Cambrian Railways adopted it in 1881 and worked it. By now it was disused once again; the track was relaid for the purpose.

== Amalgamation ==
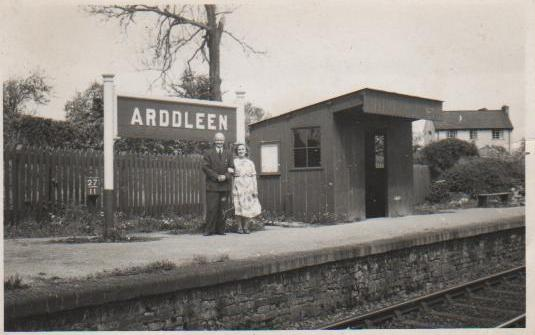
Arddleen station

For some time there had been close cooperation between the four companies which owned the lines between Whitchurch and Machynlleth. In 1864 the decision was taken to amalgamate, resulting in a bill in Parliament in 1864 to enable the Oswestry, Ellesmere and Whitchurch Railway, the Oswestry and Newtown Railway, the Llanidloes and Newtown Railway and the Newtown and Machynlleth Railway to amalgamate as the Cambrian Railways. The title took the plural from the first negotiations. The bill was passed as the Cambrian Railways Act 1864 (27 & 28 Vict. c. cclxii) on 25 July 1864, despite strong opposition from the Great Western Railway. The act protected the position of two other big Welsh companies which were not involved in the amalgamation: the Aberystwith and Welsh Coast Railway and the Mid-Wales Railway (MWR). The Cambrian Railways Company was to give the MWR full interchange after its imminent opening from Llanidloes to Talyllyn.

== Cambrian Railways and the Great Western Railway ==
The Cambrian Railways as a larger company had greater resources than the numerous small companies, although it never became financially successful. The majority of its system was single track through sparsely populated rural areas, and earlier ambitions that the routes might develop major trunk flows were never realised. As Aberystwyth in particular grew in importance, the passenger flow from Shrewsbury to Aberystwyth dominated; goods traffic remained mainly agricultural. Local mineral traffic continued, but in small quantities. During World War I heavy coal traffic was routed through Llanidloes and Newtown over the O&NR line, making a transit from South Wales collieries to Grangemouth, destined for bunkering coal-burning vessels supporting the Grand Fleet. (Note: The capital ships of the Grand Fleet were oil-fuelled, and the flow of coal was for older support vessels, and for shore plant.)

On 25 March 1922 the Cambrian Railways company was absorbed by the Great Western Railway.

The line between Welshpool and Forden was doubled by the GWR in 1925.

== Abermule collision ==
Towards the end of Cambrian Railways' control of the former O&NR line, a devastating collision took place between Abermule and Newtown on 26 January 1921, in which 17 people died and 36 were injured. Most of the Cambrian Railways system was single track, and the electric train token system was in operation. At the time this was considered to be a safe system of operation of single lines, but public confidence was severely shaken by the event.

In the electric train token system, a single line section between two stations is controlled by token instruments. One is at each of the stations at the ends of the section; they are electrically connected; when a train required to enter the section, a token (then usually a substantial metal disc, sometimes referred to as a tablet) was removed from one of the instruments, which were then automatically locked until the token was placed in the instrument at the other end of the section, after the train had passed through, or restored to the original instrument if the train did not proceed. A token could only be released by the cooperative action of the signalmen at each end of the section, and of course the token was only valid for the relevant section. A driver was forbidden to let his train enter the single line section unless he was in possession of a token for that section, and he was required to examine the token he was given to ascertain that it was actually the correct token for the section. Only the signalman or station master was allowed to handle the token and deliver it to the train driver.

Because of improper working at Abermule, other staff were in the habit of handling the tokens and releasing them from the token instrument. At the time in question, a train had arrived at Abermule, and its driver surrendered the token for the section his train had just traversed, to a member of the station staff. The token was passed to another man, who wrongly assumed it was the newly released token for the onward section, and handed it to the driver. The driver failed to check that he had been given the token for the onward section, and he started his train. Another train was in the section, approaching from the other end, and its driver was in possession of the proper token: the head-on collision was thus inevitable.

== Decline ==
After nationalisation in 1948, the financial situation of the Cambrian lines, already difficult, became much worse due to changing economics and habits. The Kerry branch, long reduced to goods-only, closed on 1 May 1956. The northern part of the main line between Oswestry and Buttington was closed to passenger traffic on 18 January 1965. The Llanfyllin branch closed on the same day, goods and mineral traffic on it having already stopped in 1964. The Llynclys quarry traffic, chiefly railway track ballast towards the end, ceased after 28 October 1988.

As of 2020, passenger service consists of typically two-hourly trains from Birmingham International to Aberystwyth and Pwllheli, dividing at Machynlleth, with some variations and additional trains. Only the joint station at Newtown remains in use among the original O&NR stations, with the addition of Oswestry under Heritage Railway restoration. The original station at Welshpool is now a retail outlet.

== Station list ==
=== Main line ===
- Oswestry; opened 1 May 1860; closed 7 November 1966: reopened 17 August 2014
- Llynclys Junction; divergence of Porthywaen branch 1861–1992;
- Llynclys; opened 1 May 1860; closed 18 January 1965;
- Pant; opened February 1862; renamed Pant Salop 1 July 1924; closed 18 January 1965;
- Llanymynech; opened 1 May 1860; closed 18 January 1965; convergence of line from Llanfyllin (by backshunt); convergence of Shropshire and Montgomeryshire line; divergence of Nantmawr branch;
- Four Crosses; opened 1 May 1860; closed 18 January 1965;
- Arddleen; opened February 1862; renamed Arddleen Halt 1954; closed 18 January 1965;
- Pool Quay; opened 1 May 1860; closed 18 January 1965;
- Cefn; opened November 1860; renamed Buttington December 1860; closed 12 September 1960; convergence of Shrewsbury and Welshpool Railway from Shrewsbury;
- Welshpool; opened 14 August 1860; re-sited to east for road scheme 18 May 1992; still open; sometimes spelt Welchpool;
- Forden; opened 10 June 1861; closed 14 June 1965;
- Montgomery; opened 10 June 1861; a permanent station was opened 1872–73; closed 14 June 1965;
- Abermule; opened 10 June 1861; closed 14 June 1965; convergence of Kerry branch 1863–1956;
- Newtown; opened 10 June 1861; still open; end-on connection with Llanidloes and Newtown Railway.

=== Porthywaen branch ===
- Llynclys Junction; above;
- Dolgoch Quarry;
- Porthywaen branch junction; divergence of Tanat Valley line;
- Porthywaen.

=== Llanfyllin branch ===
- Llanymynech; above;
- reverse;
- Rock siding;
- junction; convergence of Cambrian Railways spur from PS&NWR line;
- Llansaintffraid; opened July 1863; renamed Llansantffraid 1921; closed 18 January 1965;
- Llanfechain; opened 1 July 1865; closed 18 January 1965;
- Bryngwyn; opened May 1865; named Brongwyn at first; closed 18 January 1965;
- Llanfyllin; opened 1 July 1863; closed 18 January 1965.

=== Kerry branch ===
- Abermule; above;
- Ffronfraith; opened 9 July 1923; closed 9 February 1931; often spelt Fronfraith;
- Goitre; opened 9 July 1923; closed 9 February 1931;
- Kerry; opened 1 July 1863; closed 9 February 1931; Sunday School excursions used the line until 1939.
