= Montgomery railway station =

Former railway station in Powys, Wales

Montgomery
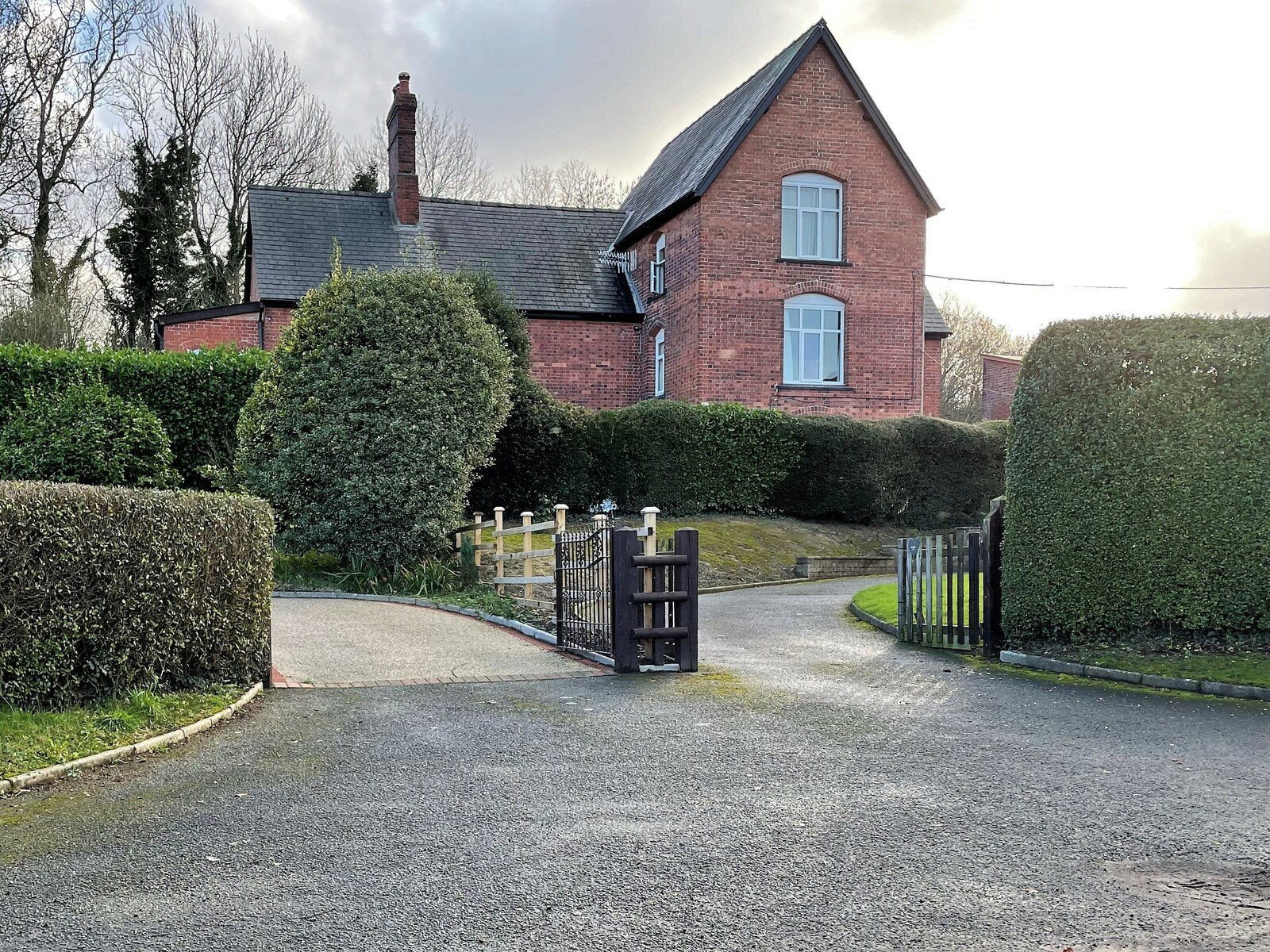

General information
- Location: Montgomery, Powys; Wales
- Coordinates: 52.5735°N 3.1752°W
- Grid reference: SO204979
- Platforms: 2

Other information
- Status: Disused

History
- Original company: Oswestry and Newtown Railway
- Pre-grouping: Cambrian Railways
- Post-grouping: Great Western Railway

Key dates
- 10 June 1861: Station opened
- 14 June 1965: Station closed
Location

Montgomery railway station served the town of Montgomery, Powys, Wales between 1861 and 1965.

== History ==
The Oswestry and Newtown Railway (O&NR) was authorised in 1855, and opened in stages. The final section, between Welshpool and Abermule, opened on 10 June 1861, and one of the stations opened that day was Montgomery.

The station was 40 1/4 miles (64.8 km) from Whitchurch, in Shropshire, between Forden and Abermule and was situated about 2 miles (3 km) from the town of Montgomery. It had two platforms which were slightly staggered, and the station building was on the northern side; there was also a signal box and goods shed.

In June 1864, the O&NR amalgamated with several other companies to form the Cambrian Railways. As part of the 1923 Grouping, the Cambrian amalgamated with the Great Western Railway.

The station was closed by British Railways on 14 June 1965, along with many other wayside stations on the route (as a result of the Beeching Axe). Much of the infrastructure survived after closure however, including the signal box, eastbound platform, goods shed and main station buildings. The box was decommissioned and removed (along with the passing loop here) in 1969, but the other structures still stand today: the main building is a private house and the goods shed is in commercial use).

== Notes ==
Preceding station	Historical railways	Following station
Abermule; Line open, station closed	Cambrian Railways; Oswestry and Newtown Railway	Forden; Line open, station closed
