= Pool Quay railway station =

Disused railway station in Wales

Pool Quay
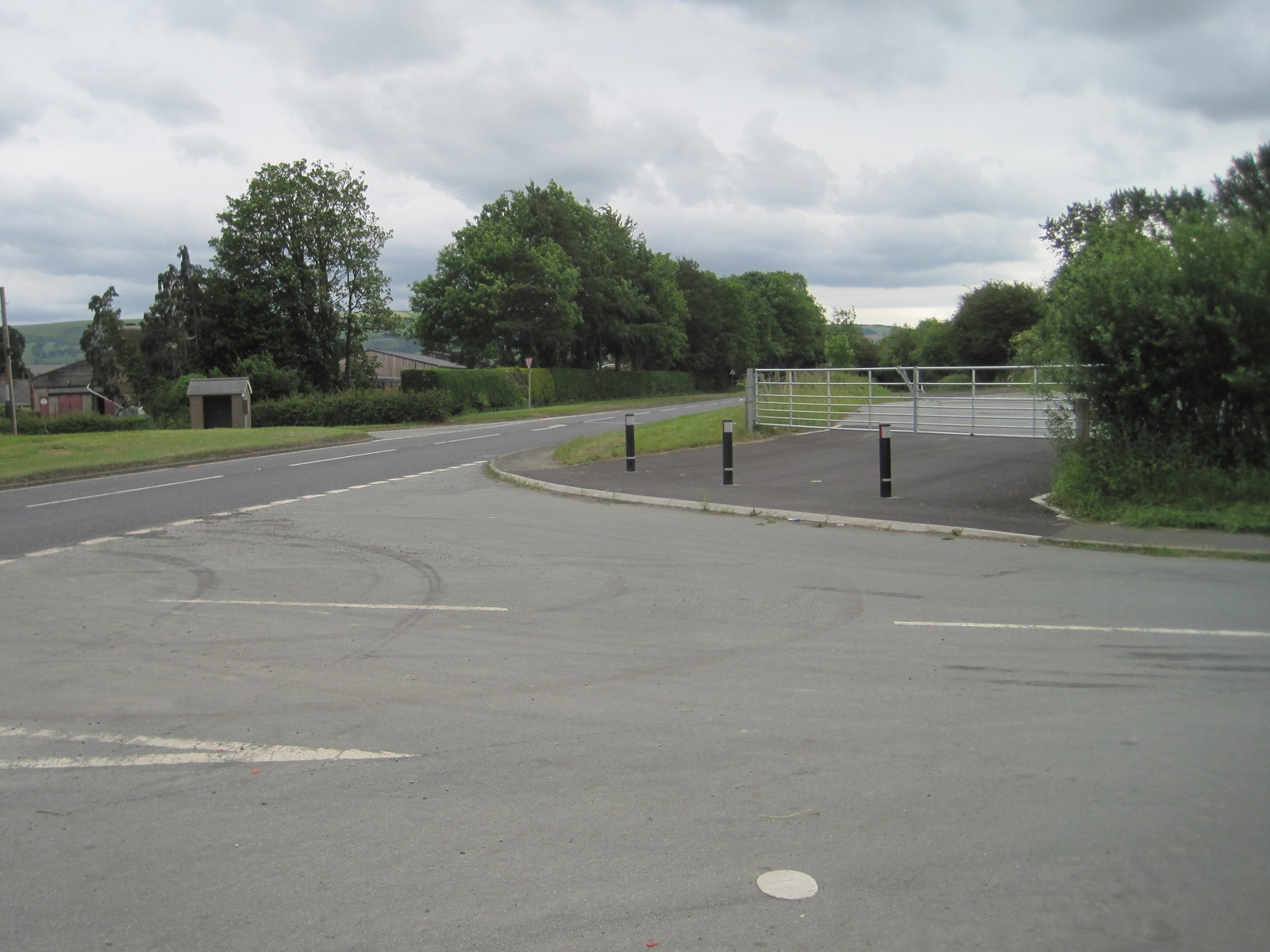
- The site of the station in 2017

General information
- Location: Pool Quay, Powys; Wales
- Coordinates: 52.7112°N 3.0959°W
- Grid reference: SJ260131
- Platforms: 2

Other information
- Status: Disused

History
- Original company: Oswestry and Newtown Railway
- Pre-grouping: Cambrian Railways
- Post-grouping: Great Western Railway

Key dates
- 1 May 1860: Opened
- 18 January 1965: Closed
Location

Pool Quay railway station was a station in Pool Quay, Powys, Wales. The station was opened on 1 May 1860 and closed on 18 January 1965.

Preceding station	Disused railways	Following station
Buttington; Line and station closed	Cambrian Railways; Oswestry and Newtown Railway	Arddleen; Line and station closed
