= Kerry railway station =

Former railway station in Powys, Wales

Kerry
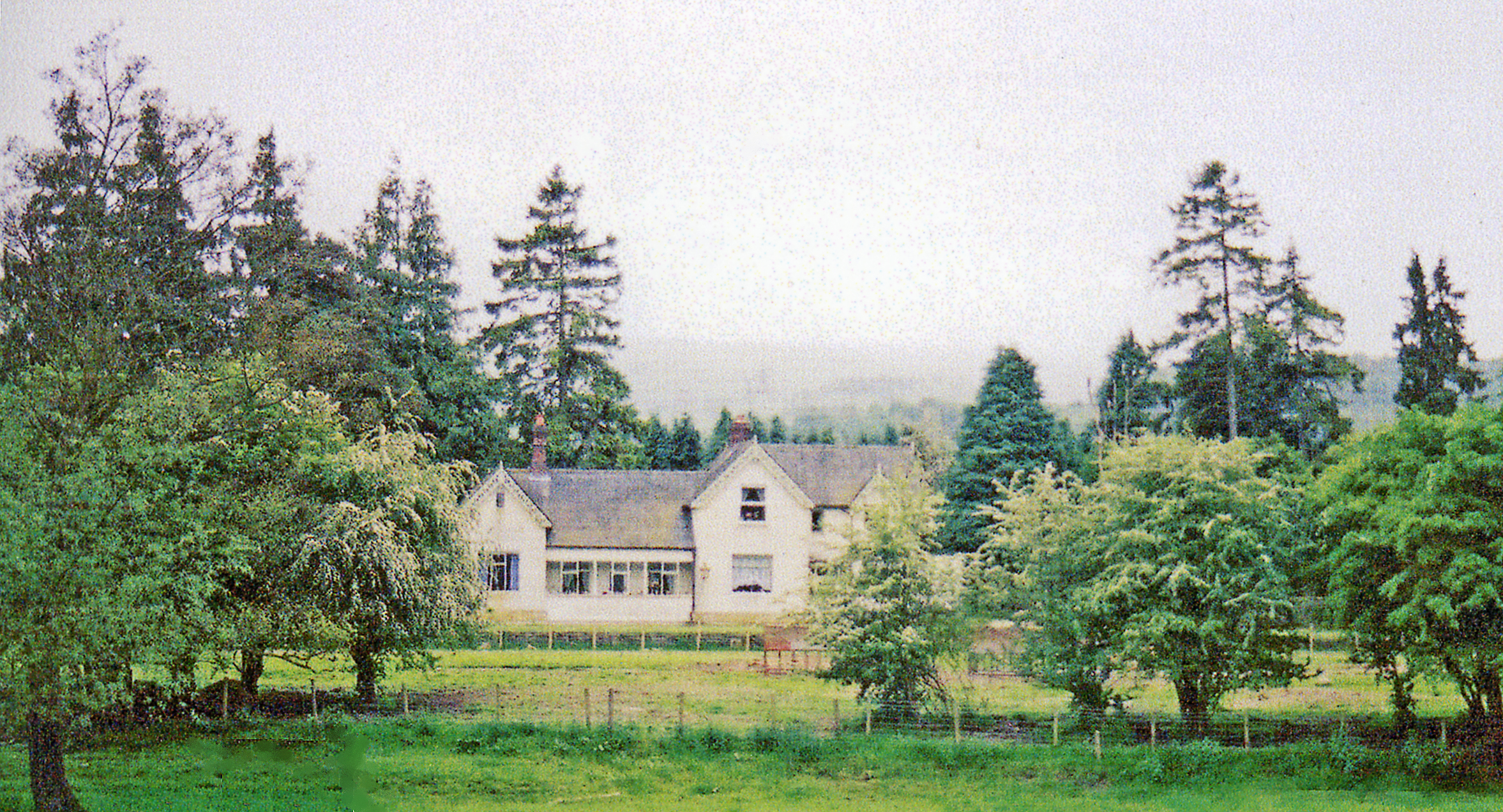
- The site of the station in 2001

General information
- Location: Glanmule, Powys; Wales
- Coordinates: 52.5049°N 3.2337°W
- Grid reference: SO162903
- Platforms: 1

Other information
- Status: Disused

History
- Original company: Oswestry and Newtown Railway
- Pre-grouping: Cambrian Railways
- Post-grouping: Great Western Railway

Key dates
- July 1863: Opened
- 9 February 1931: Closed to passengers
- 1 May 1956: Closed
Location

Kerry railway station was a station in Glanmule, Montgomeryshire (now Powys), Wales. The station was opened in July 1863, closed to passengers on 9 February 1931 and closed completely on 1 May 1956. The station was located a mile from Kerry within the fork of the Kerry and Sarn road (the A489) and the Abermule road (B4368) to the west of the Afon Miwl. The branch was single track and the station had a single platform located on the south side of the line. It was provided with an attractive cottage ornée building consisting of a two-storey station house and contiguous single-storey office range. The gables were adorned with pierced bargeboards.

At the west end of the platform there was a turntable. The station also had goods facilities located on the north side of the branch, which included two sidings, a goods shed and a loading ramp. There was also an engine shed on east side of the site. Only the station building remains today. It is used as a private residence.

Preceding station	Disused railways	Following station
Goitre Halt; Line and station closed	Cambrian Railways; Kerry branch	Terminus
