= Four Crosses railway station =

Former railway station in Wales

Four Crosses
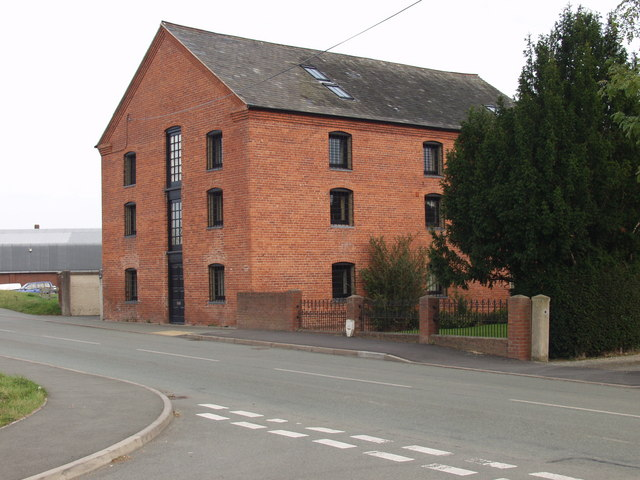
- The former creamery at Four Crosses, which once sent milk trains to London, has now been converted into flats.

General information
- Location: Four Crosses, Powys; Wales
- Coordinates: 52.7586°N 3.0813°W
- Grid reference: SJ271184
- Platforms: 2

Other information
- Status: Disused

History
- Original company: Oswestry and Newtown Railway
- Pre-grouping: Cambrian Railways
- Post-grouping: Great Western Railway

Key dates
- 1 May 1860: Opened
- 18 January 1965: Closed
Location

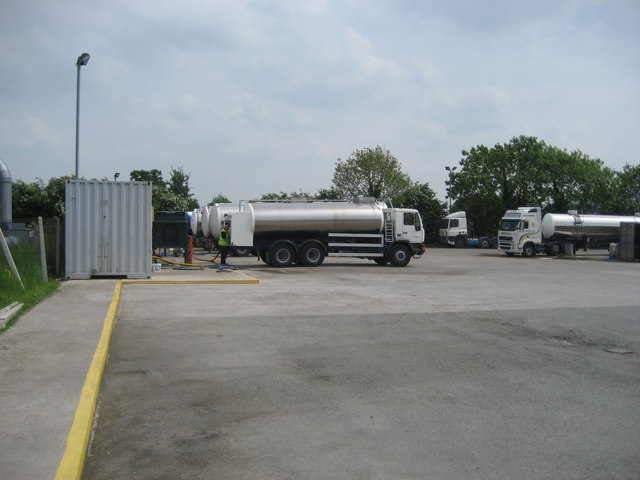
The Dairy Crest Four Crosses distribution centre now occupies the former mainline of the Cambrian Railways south for the station

Four Crosses railway station was a station on the former Cambrian Railways between Oswestry and Welshpool.

== History ==
Opened in 1860 as part of the Oswestry and Newtown Railway (O&NR), it served the village of Four Crosses in Powys, Wales.

The O&NR line south of Llanymynech to Newtown (Powys) was single track, with passing loops at each intermediate station. Four Crosses was the main crossing point for passenger trains from Oswestry to Newtown, and so was re-configured by the Great Western Railway in 1925, when a private sidings was also laid to the nearby creamery, giving milk trains direct access. The GWR improved the up platform, installed longer passing loops of 1,116 feet (340 m) in length, and reconfigured the 1896 signal box to cope with additional traffic.

In 1963, the former CR mainline was vested to the London Midland Region of British Railways, who decided to keep the parallel former Shrewsbury and Hereford Railway open. The line from Welshpool to Oswestry was hence closed in 1965, including Four Crosses station.

The station was immortalised in 1964 in the song "Slow Train" by Flanders and Swann.

Preceding station	Disused railways	Following station
Arddleen; Line and station closed	Great Western Railway; Oswestry and Newtown Railway	Llanymymnech; Line and station closed
