= Forden railway station =

Former railway station in Powys, Wales

Forden
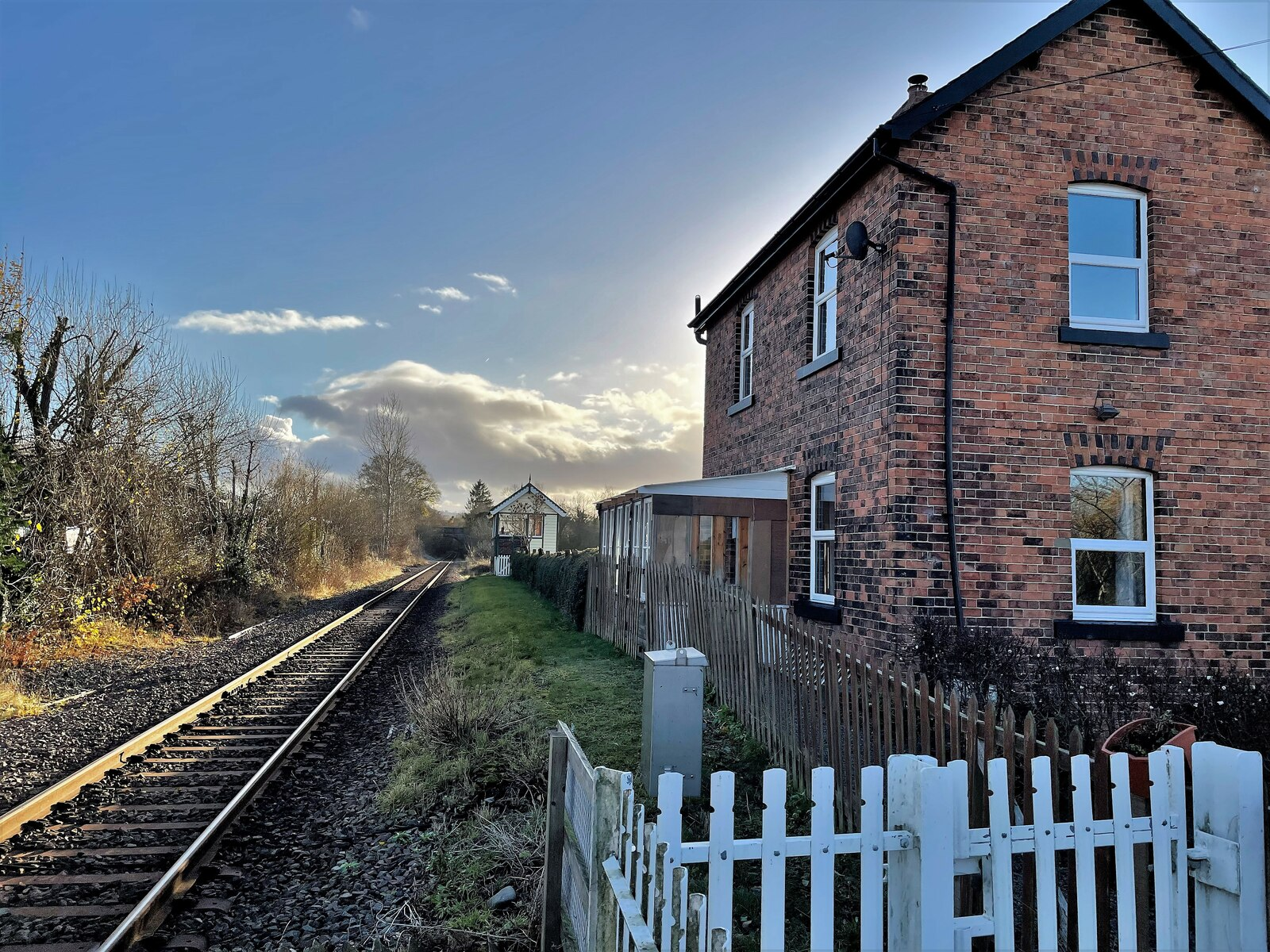

General information
- Location: Forden, Powys; Wales
- Coordinates: 52.5978°N 3.1548°W
- Grid reference: SJ218006
- Platforms: 2

Other information
- Status: Disused

History
- Original company: Oswestry and Newtown Railway
- Pre-grouping: Cambrian Railways
- Post-grouping: Great Western Railway

Key dates
- 10 June 1861: Opened
- 14 June 1965: Closed
Location

Forden railway station was a station in Forden, Powys, Wales. The station was opened on 10 June 1861 by the Oswestry and Newtown Railway on the section of line between Welshpool and Newtown. The station originally had a single platform on the western side of line (along with a goods shed and associated siding), but in 1897 a passing loop was installed here along with signal box and second platform. After the 1923 Grouping, the Great Western Railway took over operation of the line and two year later they doubled the section eastwards to Welshpool to add additional capacity on what had become a busy main line. Service levels were modest throughout this period, with the 1922 timetable having five eastbound and four westbound trains calling Mon-Sat and no Sunday service.

The station passed into the hands of British Railways upon nationalisation in January 1948; by 1955 a modest improvement in the timetable saw seven eastbound trains calling and five westbound, but by the early 1960s the service had reverted to pre-grouping levels once more (albeit with a nominal Sunday service of one train in the eastbound direction only). The Beeching Report of 1963 listed the Cambrian main line for retention but proposed the elimination of all wayside stations (only Welshpool, Newtown and Machynlleth were to be kept, though Caersws was subsequently reprieved). Goods facilities were withdrawn from 4 May 1964, with formal consent to closure granted at the end of that year; final closure took effect from 14 June 1965.

The signal box continued in use until 1969, when the line to Welshpool was singled. The main buildings and platforms were subsequently demolished, but both the signal box and station house were retained and sold by BR. These still stand (as of spring 2016), having been adapted for use as private residential accommodation.

Preceding station	Historical railways	Following station
Montgomery; Line open, station closed	Cambrian Railways; Oswestry and Newtown Railway	Welshpool; Line and station open
