= Buttington railway station =

Former railway station in Powys, Wales

Buttington
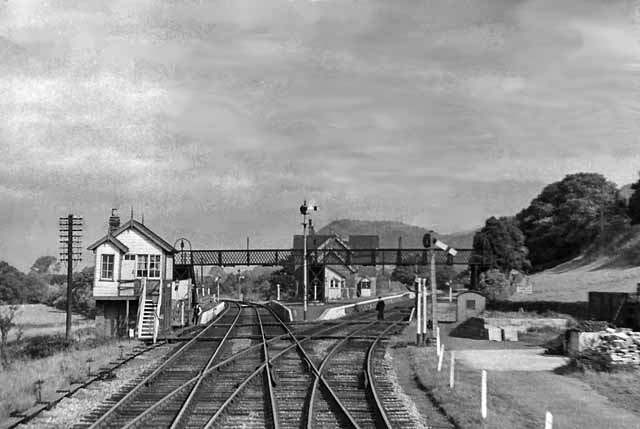

General information
- Location: Buttington, Powys; Wales
- Coordinates: 52.6827°N 3.0925°W
- Grid reference: SJ262100
- Platforms: 4

Other information
- Status: Disused

History
- Original company: Oswestry and Newtown Railway
- Pre-grouping: Cambrian Railways
- Post-grouping: Great Western Railway

Key dates
- November 1860: Opened
- 12 September 1960: Closed
Location

Buttington railway station was a station in Buttington, Powys, Wales. The station was opened in November 1860 as Cefn, being renamed to Buttington a month later. It opened on the Oswestry and Newtown Railway line, and was subsequently served by the Shrewsbury and Welshpool Railway in January 1862. The station was sited a mile north of the settlement of Buttington. The station had two lines running through it, both being worked bidirectionally. Each company used their own line.

The station house was a two-story brick villa. Goods facilities were at the south of the station including a small branch line to a nearby brick works. There was a signal box to the west of the line. The station was substantially rebuilt (with additional platforms) in 1893 by the Cambrian Railways, when the route west to Welshpool was conventiionally doubled. In 1902 the station gained a footbridge, which then had four platforms. In the mid 1950s the Cambrian up platform and the footbridge was demolished.

By 1958 there were 18 trains running Monday to Friday, with some only stopping on request. Only one train stopped on Sundays.

It was closed to both passenger and goods traffic on 12 September 1960, along with all the other intermediate stations on the Shrewsbury to Welshpool section. The signal box closed in 1964. The former O&NR route to Oswestry and Whitchurch subsequently closed in January 1965, leaving just the Shrewsbury to Welshpool line in operation - this is still open today, though no trace of the station itself remains.

Preceding station	Historical railways	Following station
Welshpool; Line and station open	Cambrian Railways; Oswestry and Newtown Railway	Pool Quay; Line and station closed
Welshpool; Line and station open	GWR and LNWR joint Shrewsbury and Welshpool Railway	Breidden; Line open, station closed
