= Abermule railway station =

Disused railway station in Abermule, Powys

Coordinates: 52.54221°N 3.23708°W

Abermule
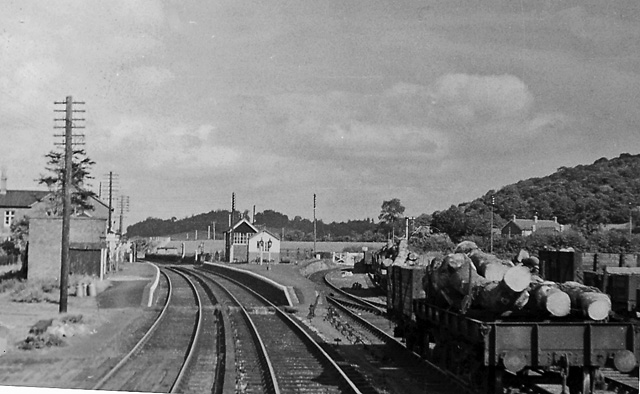
- Abermule railway station in 1953

General information
- Location: Abermule, Powys; Wales
- Platforms: 3

Other information
- Status: Disused

History
- Original company: Oswestry and Newtown Railway
- Pre-grouping: Cambrian Railways
- Post-grouping: Great Western Railway

Key dates
- 14 August 1860: Opened
- 14 June 1965: Closed
Location

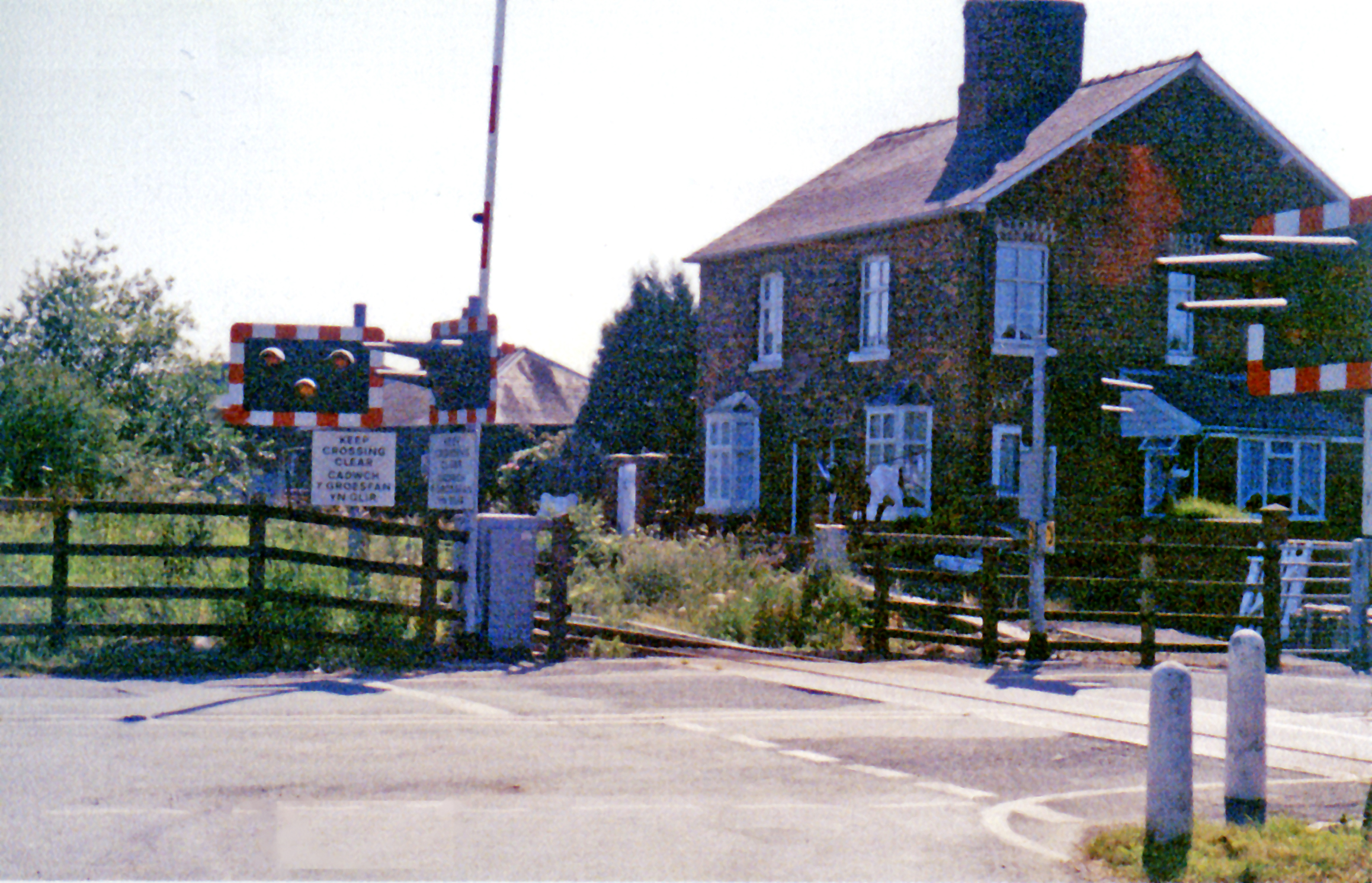
Remains of the station in 1994

Abermule railway station served the village of Abermule (Abermiwl in Welsh) in Wales. Served by the Oswestry and Newtown railway, it was situated on the English border. Until 1956 it was the junction for the short branch to Kerry, which had a passenger service until 1931 but was largely built for the local timber traffic.

== History ==
Opened by the Oswestry and Newtown Railway in 1860 (as a temporary rail head – the line to Welshpool not being ready until the following year) and then run by the Cambrian Railways, it became part of the Great Western Railway during the Grouping of 1923. The Kerry branch line was opened in July 1863, with Abermule acting as the terminus for the passenger service. This was infrequent under Cambrian management (as few as one a day each way), though the GWR tried to improve loadings by opening two intermediate halts and increasing the service frequency after the grouping. By the late 1920s though, the timetable had shrunk back to just two return trips each weekday and these finally ended in February 1931.

The line then passed on to the Western Region of British Railways on nationalisation in 1948. Freight traffic on the Kerry branch ended on 1 May 1956 and it was subsequently dismantled. The station was then closed by the British Railways Board on 14 June 1965 (along with many other wayside stations) as a result of the Beeching Axe.

== Abermule train collision ==
The Abermule train collision was a head-on collision which occurred between Abermule and Newtown on 26 January 1921, killing 17 people. The crash arose from misunderstandings between staff which effectively over-rode the safe operation of the Electric Train Tablet protecting the single line. A train departed carrying the wrong tablet for the section it was entering and collided with a train coming the other way.

== The site today ==
Trains pass through the site on the Cambrian Line, but the only surviving structure is the former station house. The platforms, waiting shelters and signal box have all been demolished, with the level crossing here now automated.

== Sources ==
- Butt, R. V. J. (October 1995). The Directory of Railway Stations: details every public and private passenger station, halt, platform and stopping place, past and present (1st ed.). Sparkford: Patrick Stephens Ltd. ISBN 978-1-85260-508-7. OCLC 60251199. OL 11956311M.
- Jowett, A. (2000). Jowett's Nationalised Railway Atlas. Atlantic Publishing. ISBN 0-906899-99-0.

Preceding station	Historical railways	Following station
Newtown; Line and station open	Cambrian Railways; Oswestry and Newtown Railway	Montgomery; Line open, station closed
	Disused railways	
Terminus	Cambrian Railways; Kerry Branch	Ffronfraith Halt; Line and station closed
