= Ffronfraith Halt railway station =

Former railway station in Powys, Wales

Ffronfraith Halt

General information
- Location: Llanmerewig, Powys; Wales
- Coordinates: 52.5300°N 3.2330°W
- Grid reference: SO164931
- Platforms: 1

Other information
- Status: Disused

History
- Original company: Great Western Railway
- Post-grouping: Great Western Railway

Key dates
- 9 July 1923: Opened
- 9 February 1931: Closed
Location

Ffronfraith Halt railway station was a station in Llanmerewig, Powys, Wales. The station was opened on 9 July 1923 and closed on 9 February 1931. It had a short and narrow platform on the east side of the line which was constructed from stone backfilled with cinders. Access was via a sloping path that led up to a bridge that spanned the line and linked to the Kerry - Abermule road. The platform is still extant.

Preceding station	Disused railways	Following station
Abermule; Line and station closed	Great Western Railway; Kerry branch	Goitre Halt; Line and station closed
