= Goitre Halt railway station =

Former railway station in Powys, Wales

Goitre Halt

General information
- Location: Llanmerewig, Powys; Wales
- Coordinates: 52.5206°N 3.2193°W
- Grid reference: SO173921
- Platforms: 1

Other information
- Status: Disused

History
- Original company: Great Western Railway
- Post-grouping: Great Western Railway

Key dates
- 9 July 1923: Opened
- 9 February 1931: Closed
Location

Goitre Halt railway station was a station in Llanmerewig, Powys, Wales. The station was opened on 9 July 1923 and closed on 9 February 1931. The halt was on the east side of the line, consisting of a short platform constructed from stone, backfilled with earth and cinders. There was also a siding here which connected to the branch to the south of the halt and terminated at the rear of the platform thus giving very little space for passengers. There are no remains of the halt today.

Preceding station	Disused railways	Following station
Ffronfraith Halt; Line and station closed	Great Western Railway; Kerry branch	Kerry; Line and station closed
