= Four Crosses, Staffordshire =

Hamlet in Staffordshire, England

Coordinates: 52.6832°N 2.0685°W

Four Crosses
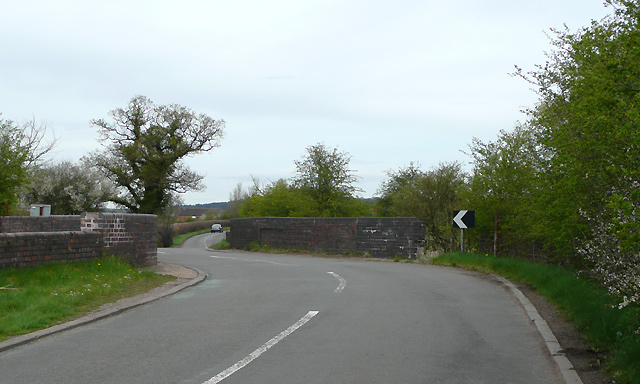
- Canal bridge on Four Crosses Lane, Staffordshire

- Location within Staffordshire
- OS grid reference: SJ954095
- Civil parish: Hatherton
- District: South Staffordshire
- Shire county: Staffordshire
- Region: West Midlands
- Country: England
- Sovereign state: United Kingdom
- Post town: Cannock
- Postcode district: WS11
- Police: Staffordshire
- Fire: Staffordshire
- Ambulance: West Midlands
- UK Parliament: Cannock Chase

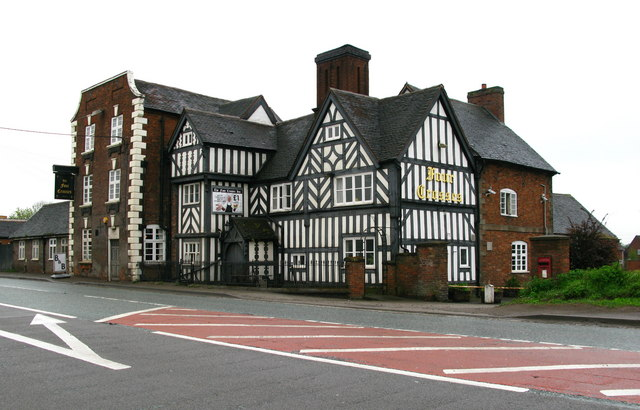
The Four Crosses pub, supposedly haunted

Four Crosses in South Staffordshire, Staffordshire, England. Is a scattered hamlet located between Cannock and Wolverhampton. As well as Penkridge and Hatherton. The hamlet is a very rural area of Cannock Chase District and is the location of the Four Crosses Inn Pub notable for legends that it is haunted. The hamlet is situated on Watling Street (A5). Four Crosses is also home to the former Chase Park Cricket Club. Which closed in 2019 and has been left derelict since closure.

The hamlet appears on OS Maps as Four Crosses.

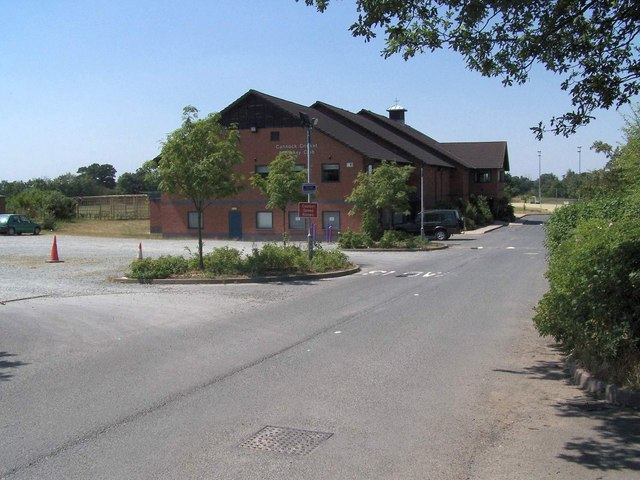
Cannock Cricket and Hockey Club on Poplar Lane in Four Crosses. As seen closed in 2019.
