= Pool Quay =

Coordinates: 52.69470°N 3.10244°W

Pool Quay: Welsh: Cei'r Trallwng
- Location within Powys
- OS grid reference: SJ255115
- Principal area: Powys
- Preserved county: Powys
- Country: Wales
- Sovereign state: United Kingdom
- Post town: WELSHPOOL
- Postcode district: SY21
- Dialling code: 01938
- Police: Dyfed-Powys
- Fire: Mid and West Wales
- Ambulance: Welsh
- UK Parliament: Montgomeryshire and Glyndŵr

Pool Quay (Welsh: Cei'r Trallwng) is a small village in Powys, Mid Wales.

== Location ==
It is situated on the A483 road, between the towns of Welshpool and Oswestry right on the banks of the river Severn.

== Attractions & amenities ==
Although only a small village in terms of population, there is a church, St John the Evangelist, and a pub, the Powis Arms.

The Offa's Dyke Path also passes through the village following the towpath of the Montgomeryshire (latterly the Montgomery) canal.

There are views of Admiral Rodney's Pillar, situated on the Breidden Hill, and The Long Mountain.

== History ==
The village gets its name from the fact that it was the highest navigable point of the river close to Welshpool which was originally simply called Pool or Poole. Thus the village was the quay for Pool.

Nearby is the site of Strata Marcella Abbey.

Besides seeing trade on the Severn, the Montgomery Canal also passes through the village and transshipment between canal and river was conducted in the village.

The village was served by the Cambrian Railways, and its successors the Great Western Railway and British Railways until 1965 although the station was some distance from the main village.
