= Four Crosses, Llandysilio =

Human settlement in Powys, Wales

Coordinates: 52°45′N 3°05′W

Four Crosses
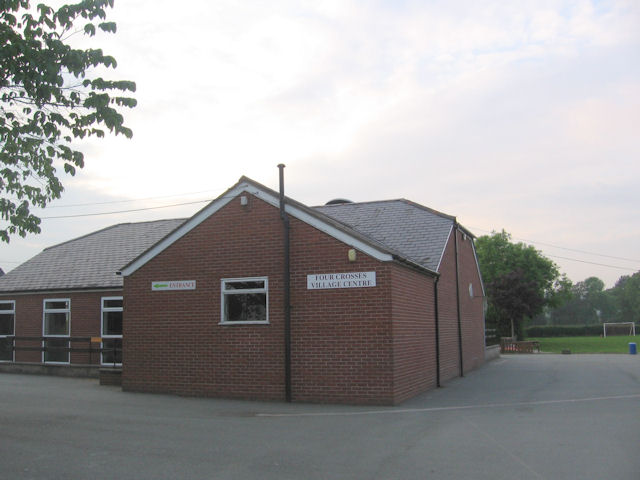
- Four Crosses village centre

- Location within Powys
- Population: 900 (2011 census)
- OS grid reference: SJ272184
- Principal area: Powys
- Preserved county: Powys
- Country: Wales
- Sovereign state: United Kingdom
- Post town: LLANYMYNECH
- Postcode district: SY22
- Dialling code: 01691
- Police: Dyfed-Powys
- Fire: Mid and West Wales
- Ambulance: Welsh
- UK Parliament: Montgomeryshire and Glyndŵr
- Senedd Cymru – Welsh Parliament: Montgomeryshire

Four Crosses (Welsh: Llandysilio) is a village in Montgomeryshire in northern Powys, mid Wales, close to the border with Shropshire. It is in the community of Llandysilio.

== Geography ==
The village sits on the Offa's Dyke Path. The nearest town is Oswestry.

== Population ==
It is home to over 900 people.

== History ==
In 2010 or shortly before that year, thirteen 2nd-4th century BC (Middle Iron Age) copper smelting furnaces were found in Domgay Lane. These were clay-lined pits equipped with block tuyeres, the latter indicating the use of bellows. Further associated remnants pointed at the smelting of a zinc-rich copper carbonate ore, with very little slag by-product. This ore was likely extracted in Llanymynech Hill (see Llanymynech Heritage Area), which had shallow mine galleries from the Iron Age similar to those of Great Orme.

=== Historic businesses ===
Historically, the village was a centre for milk collection. The Four Crosses Creamery produced prize winning ice cream which was distributed over a large area of mid/north Wales and adjoining counties.

== Transport ==
The village was served by Four Crosses railway station until 1965. It lies on the A483 road which now bypasses the village to the west.

== Sport ==
The Foxen Manor housing estate has a football field and playground. This field is home to Four Crosses who play in the Central Wales League North in the fourth tier of Welsh football. The village was the home of Rodney Rovers Football Club (played behind the Golden Lion public house).

Former British Light heavyweight Boxing Champion Dennis Powell lived in the village. A plaque is affixed to his training "hall".

The village was a stopping point (Bowyers Garage) on route to the Monte Carlo Rally.
