= Welshpool railway station =

Railway station in Powys, Wales

Welshpool Welsh: Y Trallwng
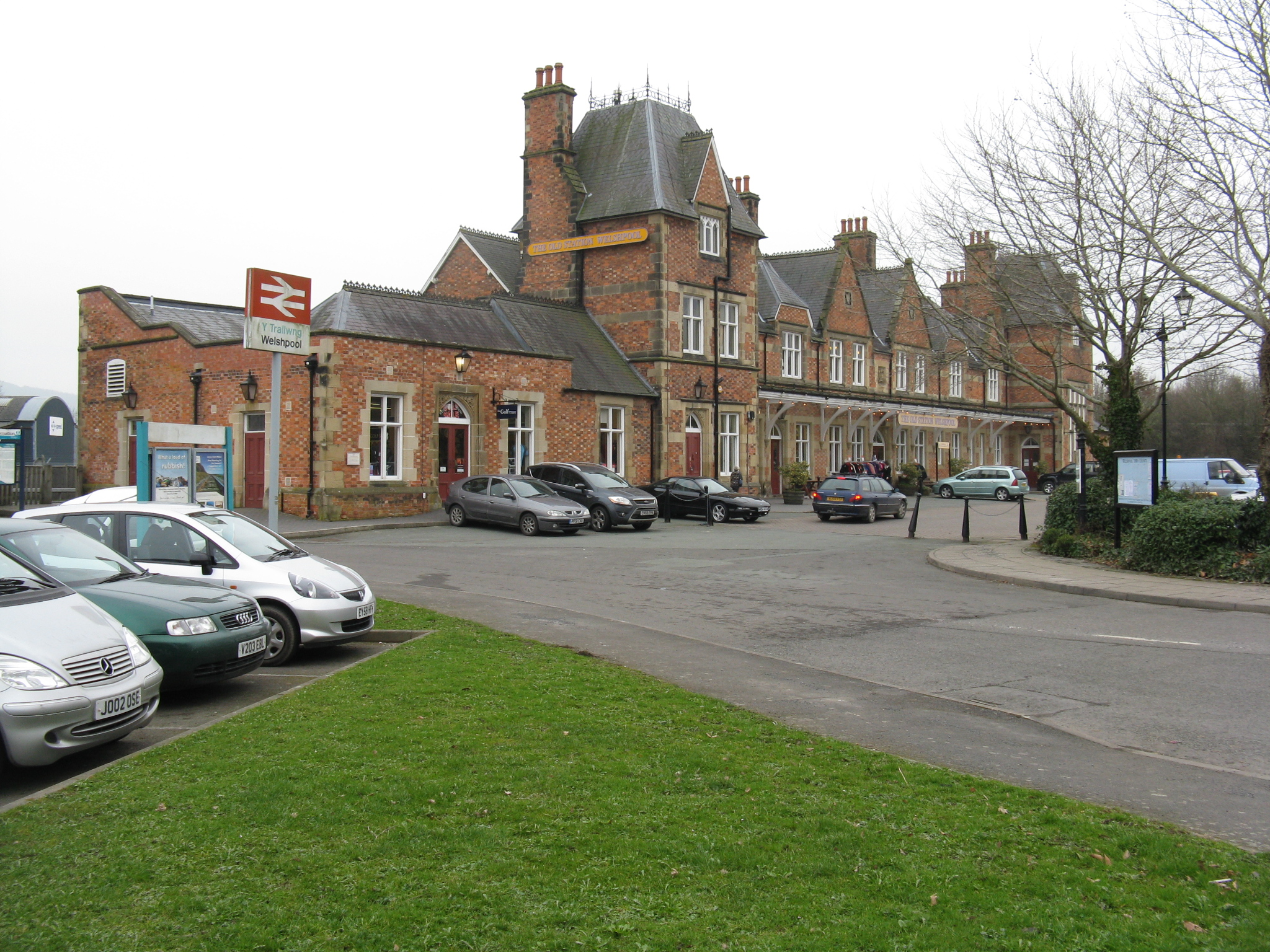

General information
- Location: Welshpool, Powys; Wales
- Coordinates: 52.657469°N 3.139947°W
- Grid reference: SJ229072
- Managed by: Transport for Wales
- Platforms: 2

Other information
- Station code: WLP
- Classification: DfT category F1

Key dates
- 14 August 1860: opened
- 18 May 1992: Original station closed and new station opened on track realignment.

Passengers
- 2020/21: ▼33,782
- 2021/22: ▲98,128
- 2022/23: ▲140,554
- 2023/24: ▲155,906
- 2024/25: ▲176,730
Location
Notes
- Passenger statistics from the Office of Rail and Road

Welshpool railway station serves the town of Welshpool (Welsh: Y Trallwng), in Powys, mid-Wales. It is a stop on the Cambrian Line between Shrewsbury and Newtown, 33 miles 70 chains (54.5 km) measured from Sutton Bridge Junction, where the Cambrian Line joins the Welsh Marches Line. The station was first opened in August 1860, but was resited a short distance away in May 1992 to allow for track realignment on the same day that the original closed.

== History ==
=== Original station ===
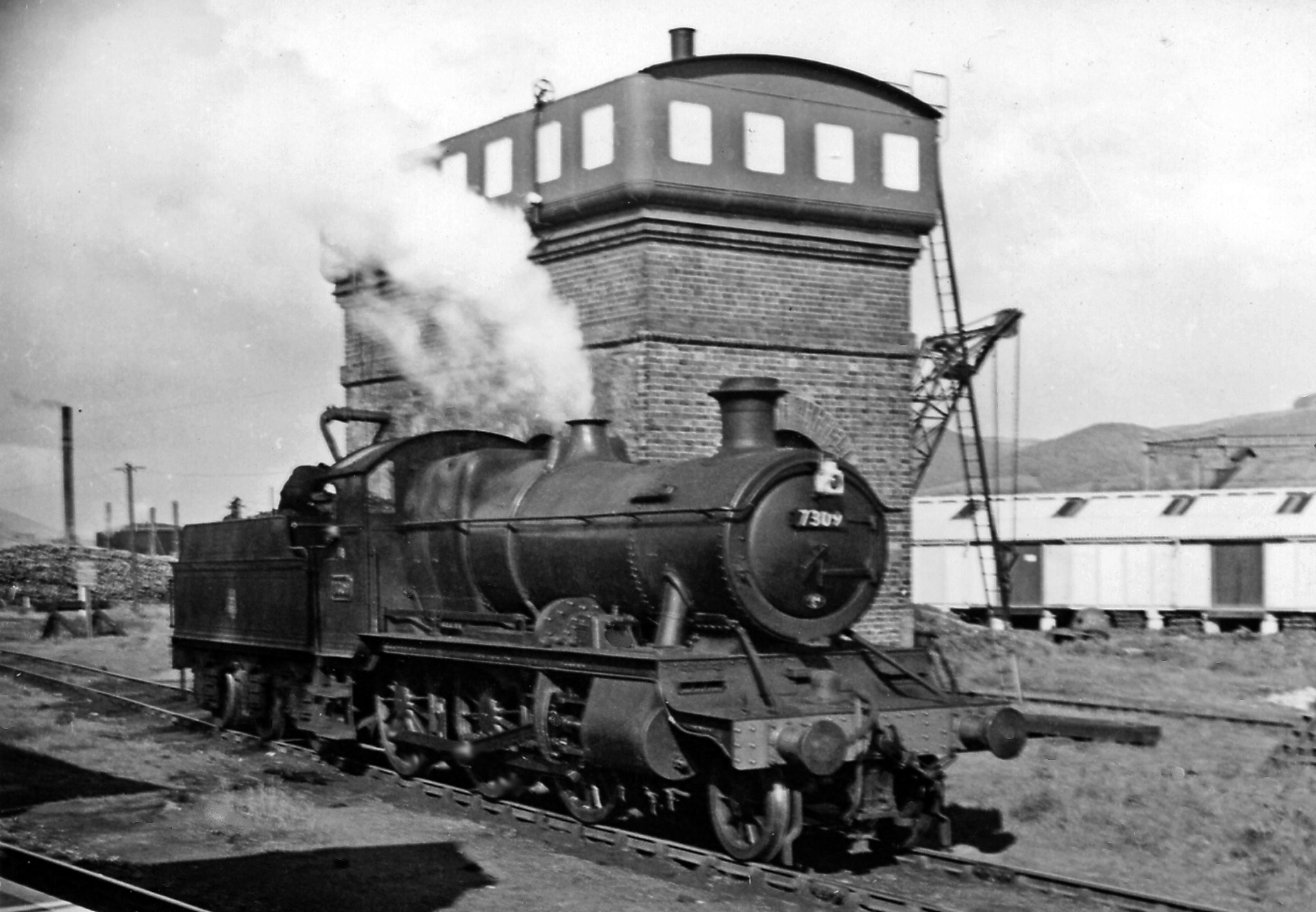
G.J. Churchward-designed GWR 4300 Class 2-6-0 no. 7309 exits the locomotive depot at Welshpool in 1957

Built by the Oswestry & Newtown Railway, the original station opened on 14 August 1860 (although some sources suggest 1859). The line was initially operated by the London & North Western Railway before being absorbed by the Cambrian Railways, which became part of the Great Western Railway at the grouping that came into effect on 1 January 1923.

About 100 metres north of the station were exchange sidings with the narrow gauge Welshpool & Llanfair Light Railway, which opened for freight traffic in 1903. They closed in 1956, with a separate station serving passenger traffic until 1931. By 2017, the only remains are part of the cattle dock which has mixed gauge track embedded into concrete track bed.

The station building is extant and has been converted into a shop and café; all other remains of this station and the site of the railway were obliterated by the construction of the new A483 road.

=== Present station ===
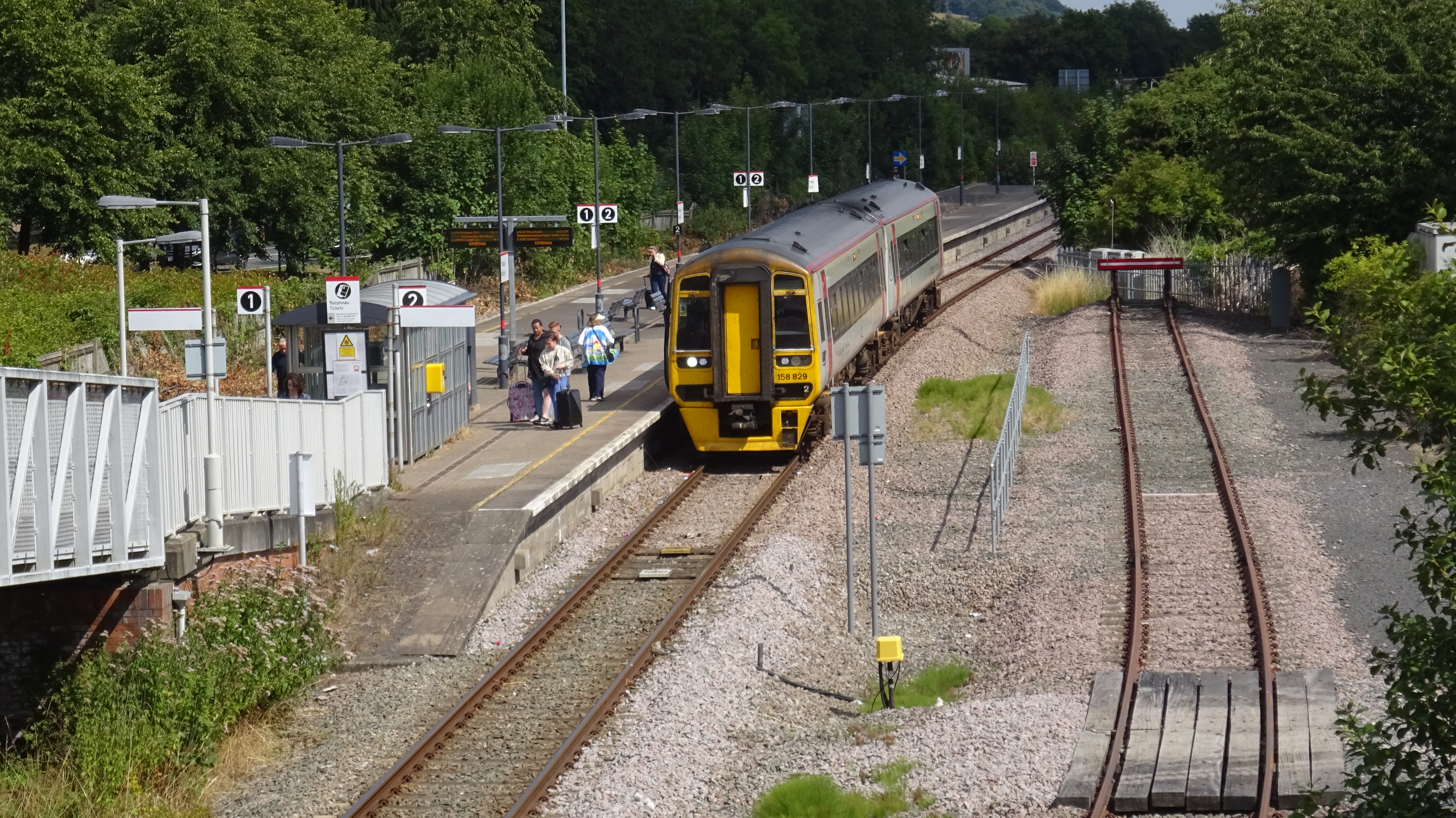
The present Welshpool station

There was some severe rationalisation of services under the Beeching cuts in the 1960s, with the old Cambrian main line to Whitchurch via Oswestry closed to passengers in January 1965; most local stations towards Aberystwyth following suit later that year. Two of the four platforms at the old station were later taken out of use. Subsequent development of the A483 road Welshpool bypass, which opened in July 1993, required the railway line to be shifted to the south. To enable this, the original station was closed and a new single island platform was constructed by British Rail north of it, to allow realignment in 1992.

The replacement station platform is reached by a pedestrian bridge crossing both the railway and the A483, with long uncovered inclines to the north and stepped access from the south. The original station building can still be seen across the road.

== Facilities ==
There are no facilities beyond a ticket vending machine, small shelter, bench seating, passenger information displays and a customer help point.

== Passenger volume ==
Passenger Volume at Welshpool
	2002–03	2004–05	2005–06	2006–07	2007–08	2008–09	2009–10	2010–11	2011–12	2012–13	2013–14	2014–15	2015–16	2016–17	2017–18	2018–19	2019–20	2020–21	2021–22	2022–23
Entries and exits	60,538	70,833	72,660	78,205	90,100	95,778	101,404	105,590	114,364	117,254	122,446	133,744	157,646	170,648	180,486	181,768	165,724	33,782	98,128	140,554

The statistics cover twelve month periods that start in April.

== Services ==
Transport for Wales operates trains westwards to Machynlleth, which then split to Aberystwyth and Pwllheli; eastbound services travel to Shrewsbury and Birmingham International.

There is a basic two-hourly service each way on weekdays and Saturdays, with additional hourly Shrewsbury to Aberystwyth services at peak times. On Sundays, there is a two-hourly service on the Shrewsbury - Aberystwyth axis, five of which have through portions or connections along the coast to/from Pwllheli.

Preceding station	National Rail	Following station
Newtown	Transport for Wales; Cambrian Line	Shrewsbury
Historical railways
Forden; Line open, station closed	Cambrian Railways; Oswestry & Newtown Railway	Buttington; Line open, station closed
Terminus	GWR and LNWR joint Shrewsbury and Welshpool Railway	Buttington; Line open, station closed
Heritage railways
Walking connection with the Welshpool & Llanfair Light Railway at Welshpool Raven Square

== Bibliography ==
- Mitchell, Vic; Smith, Keith (2008). Shrewsbury to Newtown. Middleton Press. pp. 64–77. ISBN 9781906008291. OCLC 228374968.
- Quick, Michael (2023). Railway Passenger Stations in Great Britain: A Chronology (PDF) (5th ed.). London: Railway and Canal Historical Society.
