= Kerry branch line =

The Kerry branch line was a railway line from Abermule to Kerry in Powys, Wales.

The 3 mi 55 ch (5.9 km) branch was authorised in 1861 and opened in March 1863. The line was used by passengers between April 1863 and February 1931. The line was used for freight from opening and until May 1956.
