= Cambrian Railways =

British railway company (1864–1922)

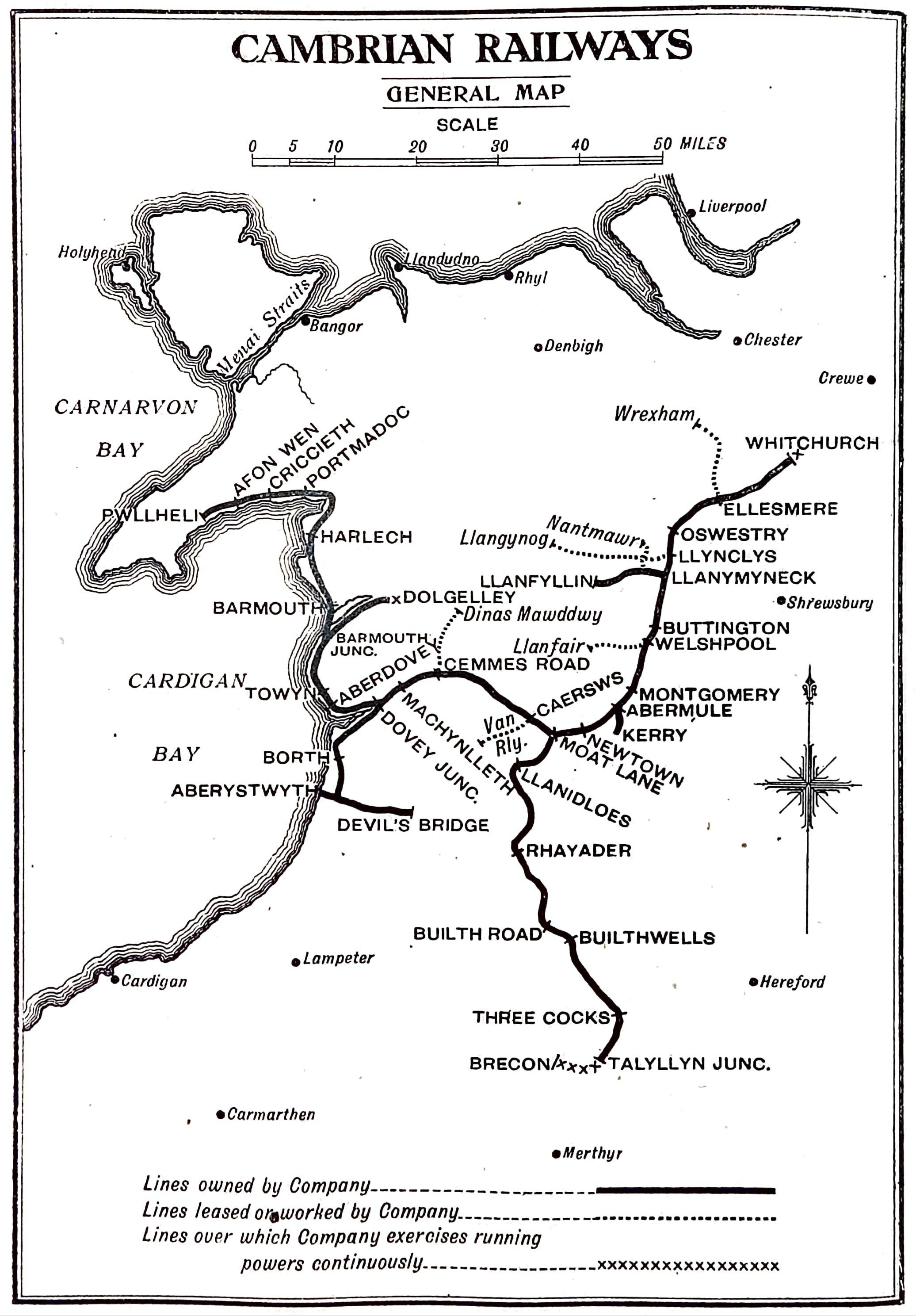
- 1920 map of the railway

Technical
- Track gauge: 4 ft 8 1/2 in (1,435 mm)
- Length: 295 miles 24 chains (475.2 km) (1919)
- Track length: 396 miles 79 chains (638.9 km) (1919)

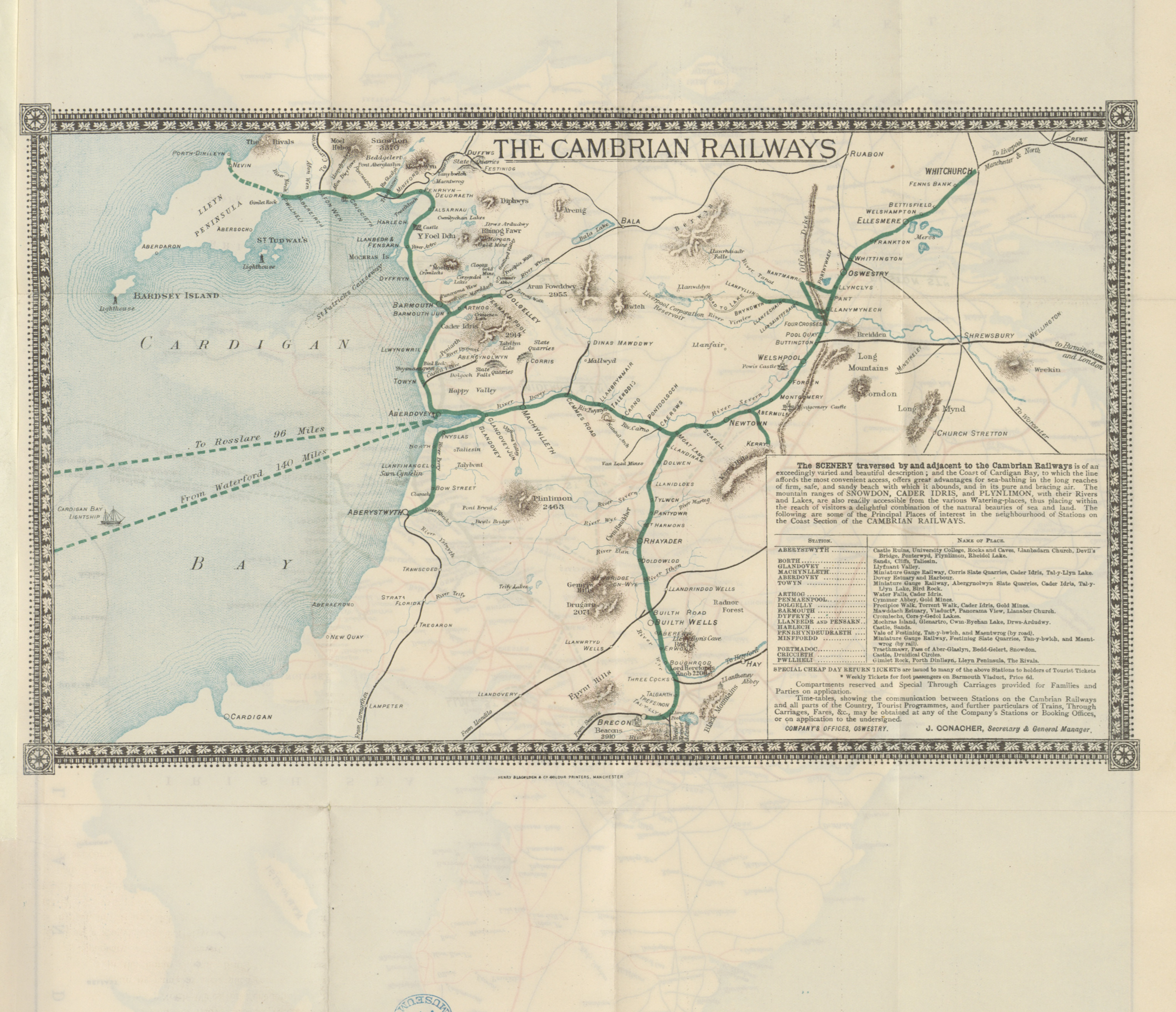
Map from 'Picturesque Wales: a handbook of scenery accessible from the Cambrian Railways'

The Cambrian Railways owned 230 miles (370 km) of track over a large area of mid Wales. The system was an amalgamation of a number of railways that were incorporated in 1864, 1865 and 1904. The Cambrian connected with two larger railways with connections to the northwest of England via the London and North Western Railway, and the Great Western Railway for connections between London and Wales. The Cambrian Railways amalgamated with the Great Western Railway on 1 January 1922 as a result of the Railways Act 1921. The name is continued today in the route known as the Cambrian Line.

== History ==
=== Creation of the Cambrian Railways: 1864 ===
Cambrian Railways Act 1864
- Act of Parliament
- Parliament of the United Kingdom
- Long title: An Act to amalgamate the Oswestry and Newtown, Llanidloes and Newtown, Newtown and Machynlleth, and Oswestry, Ellesmere and Whitchurch Railway Companies; and to confer Powers upon the amalgamated and other Companies.
- Citation: 27 & 28 Vict. c. cclxii

Dates
- Royal assent: 25 July 1864

Text of statute as originally enacted

Cambrian Railways Act 1901
- Act of Parliament
- Parliament of the United Kingdom
- Long title: An Act to authorise the Cambrian Railways Company to extend their railway at Pwllheli to grant further powers to that Company in respect of the use of steam vessels and for other purposes.
- Citation: 1 Edw. 7. c. lxix

Dates
- Royal assent: 2 July 1901

The Cambrian Railways Company was created on 25 July 1864 when the Cambrian Railways Act 1864 (27 & 28 Vict. c. cclxii) received royal assent. The company was formed by amalgamating most of the railway companies in mid Wales: the Oswestry and Newtown Railway, the Llanidloes and Newtown Railway, the Newtown and Machynlleth Railway and the Oswestry, Ellesmere and Whitchurch Railway. The shareholders of these constituent companies became the shareholders in the new Cambrian Railways Company. The Aberystwith and Welsh Coast Railway was not included in the amalgamation because it was still under construction. In all, the new company had lines totalling 97 1/4 miles (157 km) in length.

As well as incorporating existing railways, the new company had agreements to share traffic with the Mid-Wales Railway, the Manchester and Milford Railway and the Great Western Railway. This allowed it to control the transportation of goods and passengers across mid Wales.

== The Cambrian Railways system ==
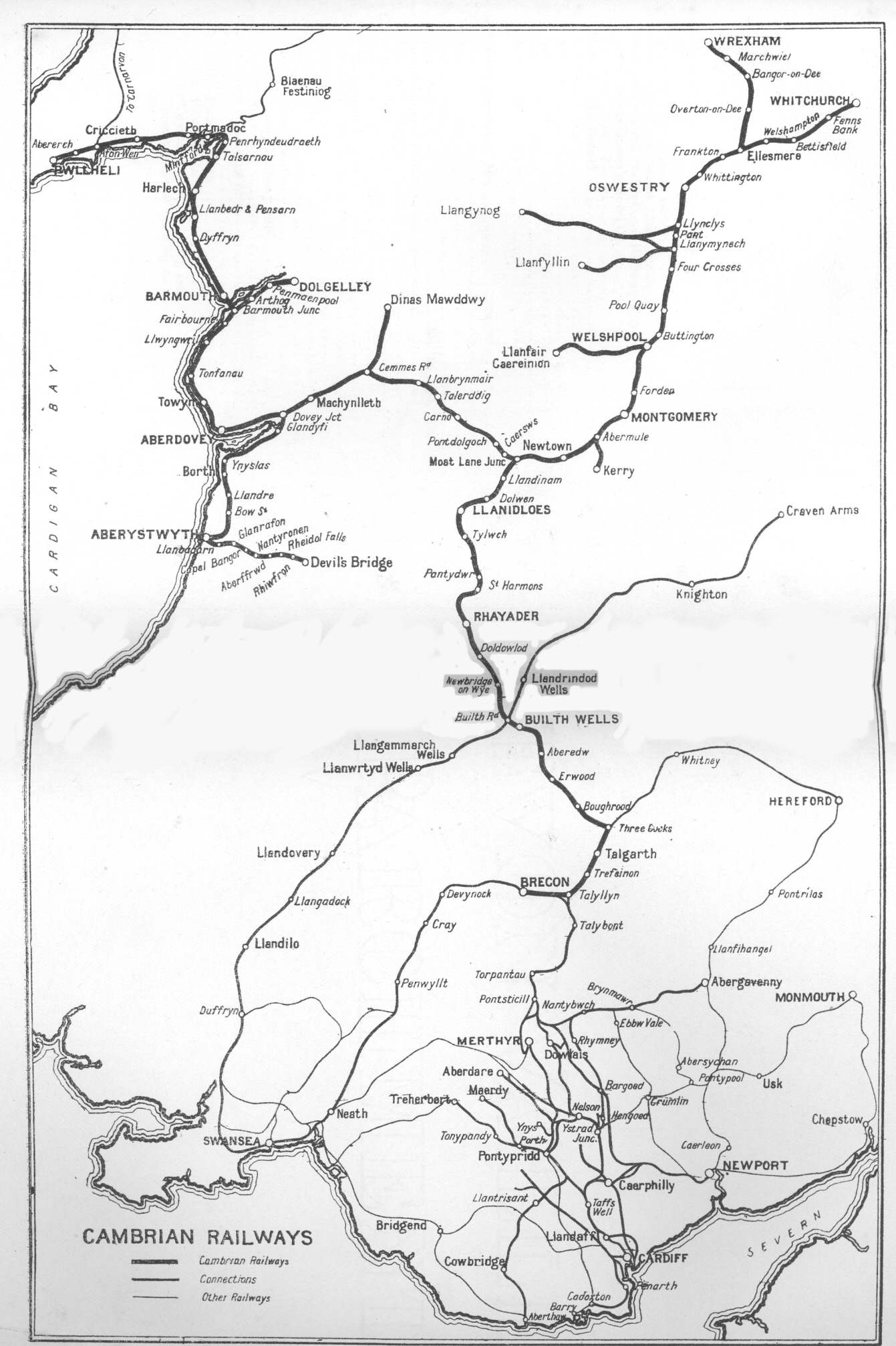
Circa 1921 map of the Cambrian Railways

=== Constituent railways ===
The earliest section of the Cambrian was the section from Three Cocks to Talyllyn Junction. This had been opened in 1816 as part of the Hay Railway, a tramroad worked by horses connecting the town of Hay-on-Wye with the Brecknock and Abergavenny Canal at Brecon. The western section was sold to the Brecon and Merthyr Railway; the eastern section became part of the Mid-Wales Railway.

In the following list the dates are: date of incorporation; opening date

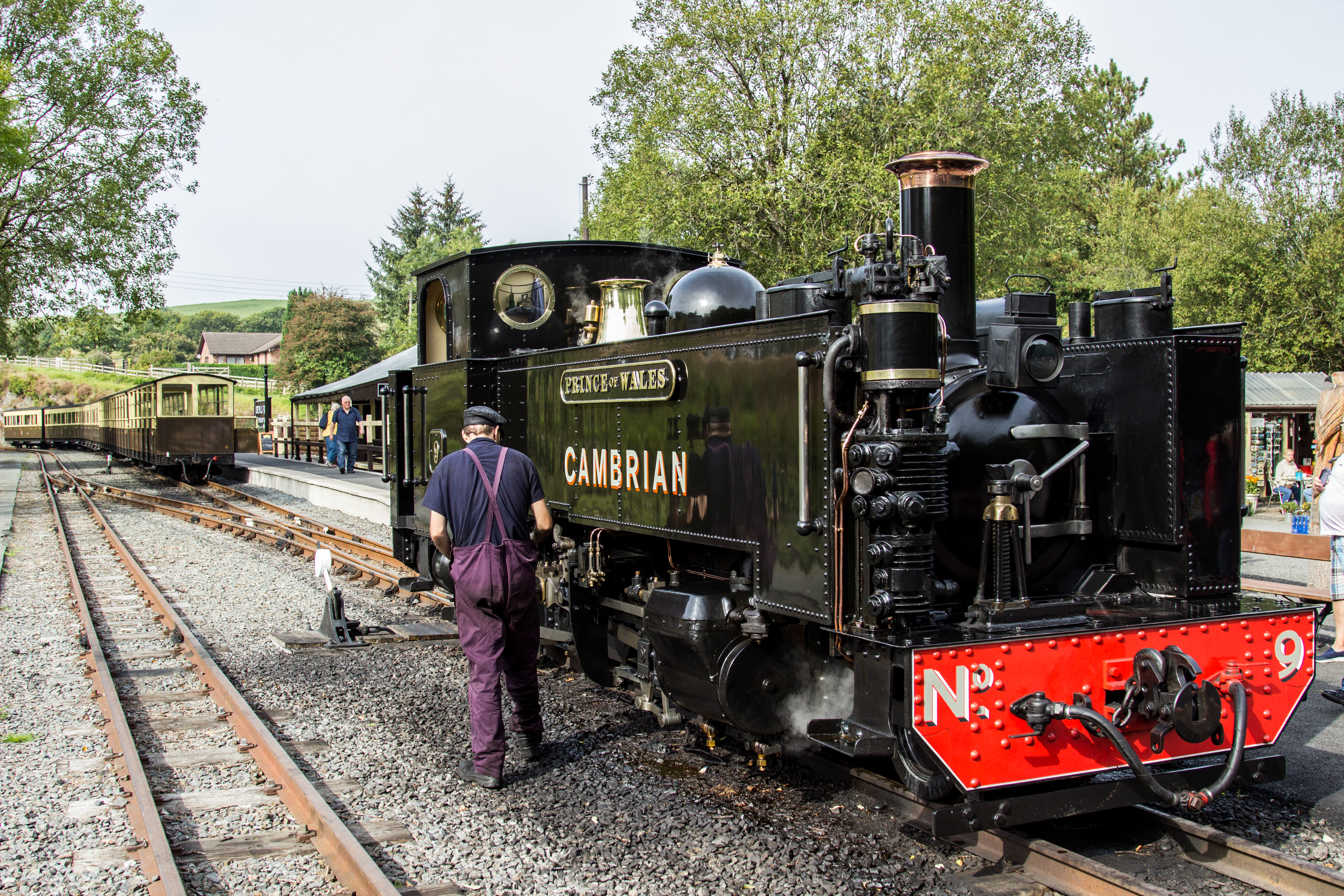
Vale of Rheidol No. 9 Prince of Wales in Cambrian livery

- Oswestry and Newtown Railway 30 miles (48 km): 6 June 1855; 1860–61
- Llanidloes and Newtown Railway 12 1/2 miles (20 km): 4 August 1853; 1859. Until 1861 this section of the line was isolated
- Newtown and Machynlleth Railway 23 miles (37 km): 27 July 1857; 1863
- Oswestry, Ellesmere and Whitchurch Railway 18 miles (29 km): 1 August 1861; 1863–1864
- Aberystwith and Welsh Coast Railway 86 miles (138 km): 26 July 1861; 1863–1869
- Mid-Wales Railway 45 1/2 miles (73 km): 1 August 1859; 1 September 1864. This railway was independent of the Cambrian until 1 January 1888, when the latter took over working the line. On 1 July 1904 the two railways amalgamated.
- Wrexham and Ellesmere Railway 12 3/4 miles (21 km); opened in 1895. Wrexham was the largest town served by the Cambrian.
- Van Railway (serving lead mines) 6 1/2 miles (10 km): built 1871
- Welshpool and Llanfair Light Railway 9 miles (14 km): 2 ft 6 in (762 mm) gauge: opened 4 April 1903; closed to all traffic on 5 November 1956: reopened as a heritage railway 6 April 1963.
- Tanat Valley Light Railway (Llynclys to Llangynog) 15 miles (24 km): opened 5 January 1904: closed to passengers 1951
- Mawddwy Railway 6 3/4 miles (11 km): incorporated 5 July 1865: closed to passengers 1931; closed 1951
- Vale of Rheidol Railway 11 3/4 miles (19 km): 1 ft 11 1/2 in (597 mm) gauge: built 1902, absorbed 1913.

=== Branch lines ===
- Abermule to Kerry
- Barmouth Junction to Dolgellau
- Llanymynech to Llanfyllin Branch

(The information in this section was taken largely from The Railway Year Book 1912.)

== Feeder lines ==
The Cambrian had connections with many independent lines, including:

=== Narrow gauge ===
- Corris Railway, at Machynlleth
- Hendre-Ddu Tramway, at Aberangell
- Festiniog Railway, at Minffordd
- Kerry Tramway, at Kerry
- Plynlimon and Hafan Tramway, at Llanfihangel (later Llandre)
- Talyllyn Railway, at Tywyn

=== Standard gauge ===
- Potteries, Shrewsbury & North Wales Railway (later Shropshire and Montgomeryshire Railway), at Llanymynech
- Manchester & Milford Railway (later part of the GWR) at Aberystwyth
- Mawddwy Railway at Cemmes Road railway station
- Van Railway at Caersws

== Railway operations ==
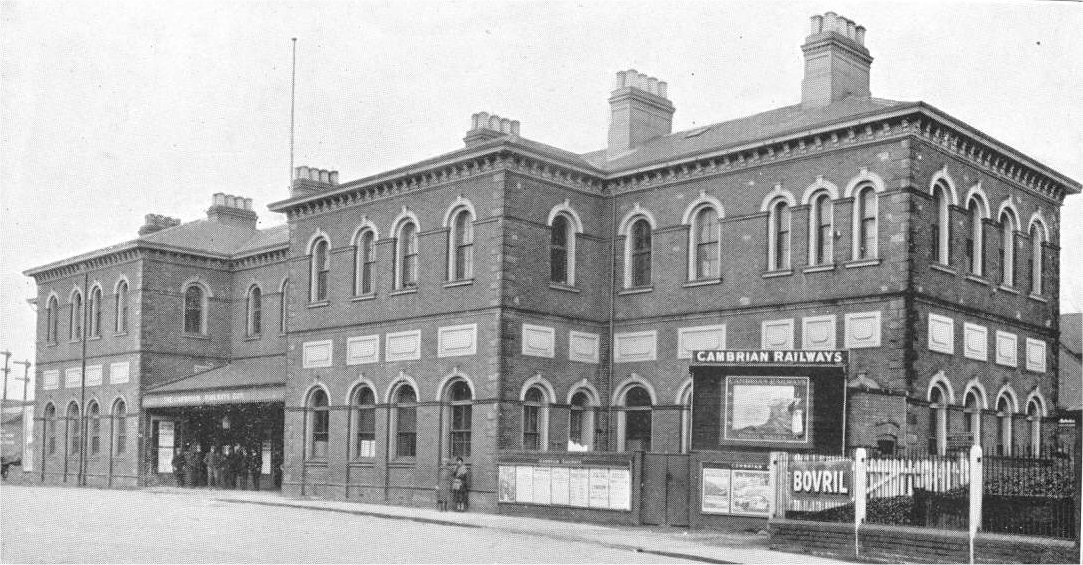
Oswestry railway station and the company head office, circa 1921

The headquarters of the Cambrian Railways was at Oswestry railway station in Shropshire. The building still stands today, although detached from modern network main railway lines, and was in use for commercial purposes until 2004. After restoration in 2005, this building was reopened as the Cambrian Visitor Centre in June 2006; but on 11 January 2008 closed due to the terms of the lease not being settled. It has since reopened and, amongst other things, is as of 2009 being used as the headquarters for the newly formed Cambrian Heritage Railways (CHR) restoration project.

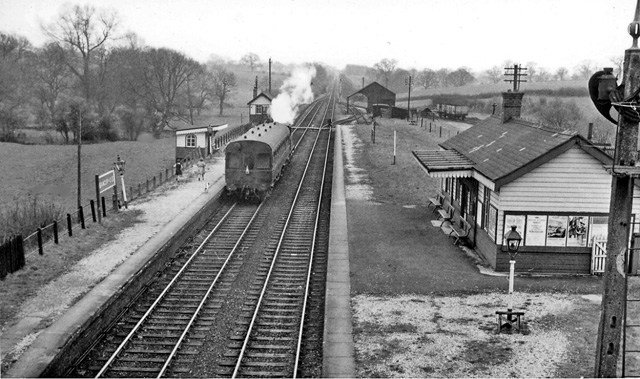
Bangor-on-Dee station in 1962

The largest station premises on the line were at Aberystwyth (part of which has been restored and reopened as a J D Wetherspoon in the mid-2000s).

== Locomotives ==
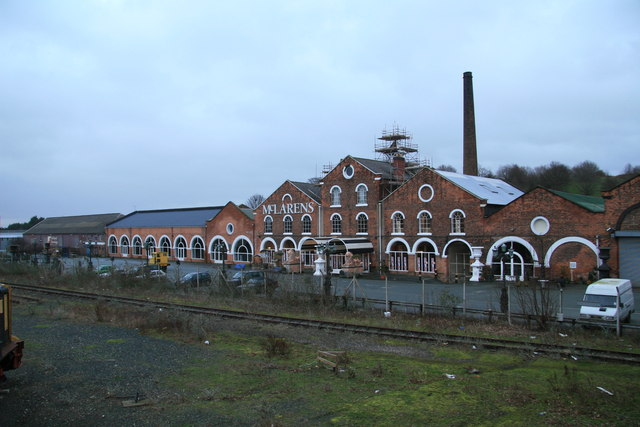
Former Cambrian Railways workshops, Oswestry. Now an antiques warehouse

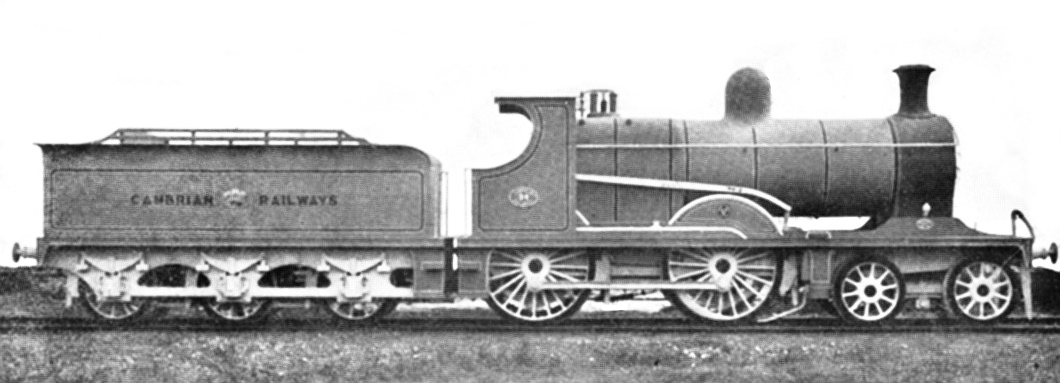
The "latest Cambrian Passenger Express Locomotive", circa 1921

On vesting its headquarters in July 1865 in Oswestry, the company built the Cambrian railways works to the north of the station on Gobowen Road. Its construction hastened Oswestry's boom as a railway town, from a population of 5,500 in 1861, to nearly 10,000 in 1901.

Built of local red brick and costing £28,000, the locomotive erecting shop had a central traverser which was hand-operated, serving 12 roads on each side. On the far north end of the works, 11 sidings accessed a carriage and wagon works. Power to the machines was provided by a large steam engine via overhead shafting and belts. The 150-foot (46 m) chimney is still a local landmark. Whilst many carriages and wagons were built in the workshops, only two locomotives were actually constructed at Oswestry, though many were rebuilt there. After the Cambrian Railways was taken over by the GWR on grouping in 1923, the GWR kept the works open as a regional carriage and wagon works, and locomotive repair shop for the associated locomotive shed.

In 1911 there were 91 locomotives and one rail motor car in the Cambrian's rolling stock. At grouping in 1922, 94 standard-gauge engines and five narrow-gauge engines were transferred to the GWR, identified by type and builder at Locomotives of the Great Western Railway.

After becoming part of the London Midland Region in 1963, the depot closed in January 1965, the works in early 1966. A Grade II listed building, the works today is an antiques centre, small business hub and document storage centre.

== Accidents ==
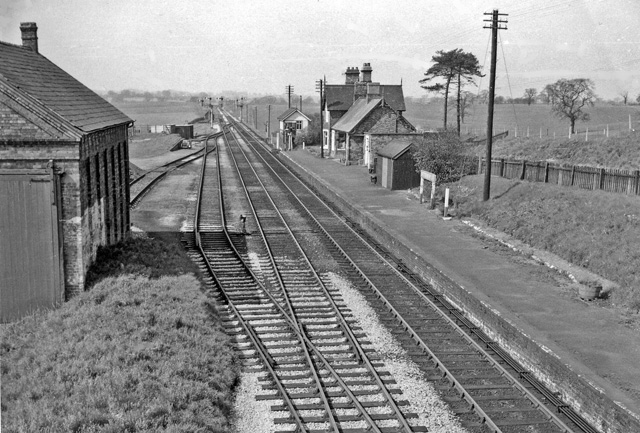
Bettisfield Station in 1962

- On 1 January 1883, a passenger train was struck by a landslide at Friog, Merionethshire. The locomotive and its tender were pushed into the sea. Both crew were killed.
- On 11 June 1897, a passenger train was derailed at Welshampton, Shropshire due to a combination of defective track and excessive speed. Twelve people were killed.
- On 17 January 1918, two freight trains were in a head-on collision at Parkhall, Shropshire due to irregular operation of tablet instruments by signalmen at Oswestry North and Ellesmere Junction signal boxes. The design of the circuitry connecting the instruments and the weather were contributory factors.
- A head-on collision occurred at Abermule on 26 January 1921, killing 15 passengers, including Lord Herbert Vane-Tempest, chairman of the company and son of the fifth Marquess of Londonderry. The accident was caused by a confusion amongst the staff at Abermule whereby the driver of the train in the station was given back the token he had just handed over, for the section of track he had just travelled over – it would not have been possible to give him the token for the next section. The driver did not check which token he had and set off. He soon collided with the Aberystwyth to Manchester express coming the other way, which had the token for that section.

== Legacy today ==
A registered museum dedicated to the history of the Cambrian Railways is run by Cambrian Heritage Railways in Oswestry.

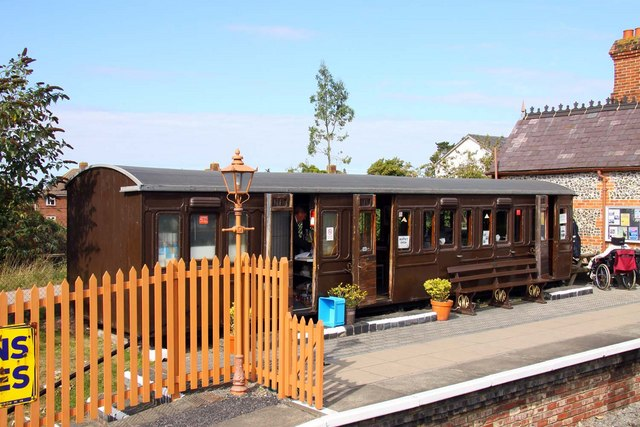
No. 247 at Chinnor Railway station.

A selection of original Cambrian Railways coaches have survived into the present day. Coaches 4, 251 and an unidentified saloon/brake car all stand in private residence. No. 9 is in private storage. No. 110 is being restored to service on the Swindon and Cricklade Railway. No. 238 and an unidentified six-wheel brake resides with the National Museums & Galleries of Wales. No. 247 is currently being used as the café at Chinnor station on the Chinnor and Princes Risborough Railway and No. 250 as a museum on the neighbouring Cholsey and Wallingford Railway having formerly been the Wallingford station café. Both No. 247 and No. 250 are grounded bodies. An unidentified first class passenger body also stands on the Tanat Valley Light Railway. A full brake car, No. 104, was recovered in August 2018 and currently resides on the Swindon and Cricklade Railway awaiting restoration.

No Cambrian standard-gauge locomotives still exist.

== See also ==
- Railways of Shropshire
- Cambrian Heritage Railways
- The Old Bell Museum, Montgomery, Powys

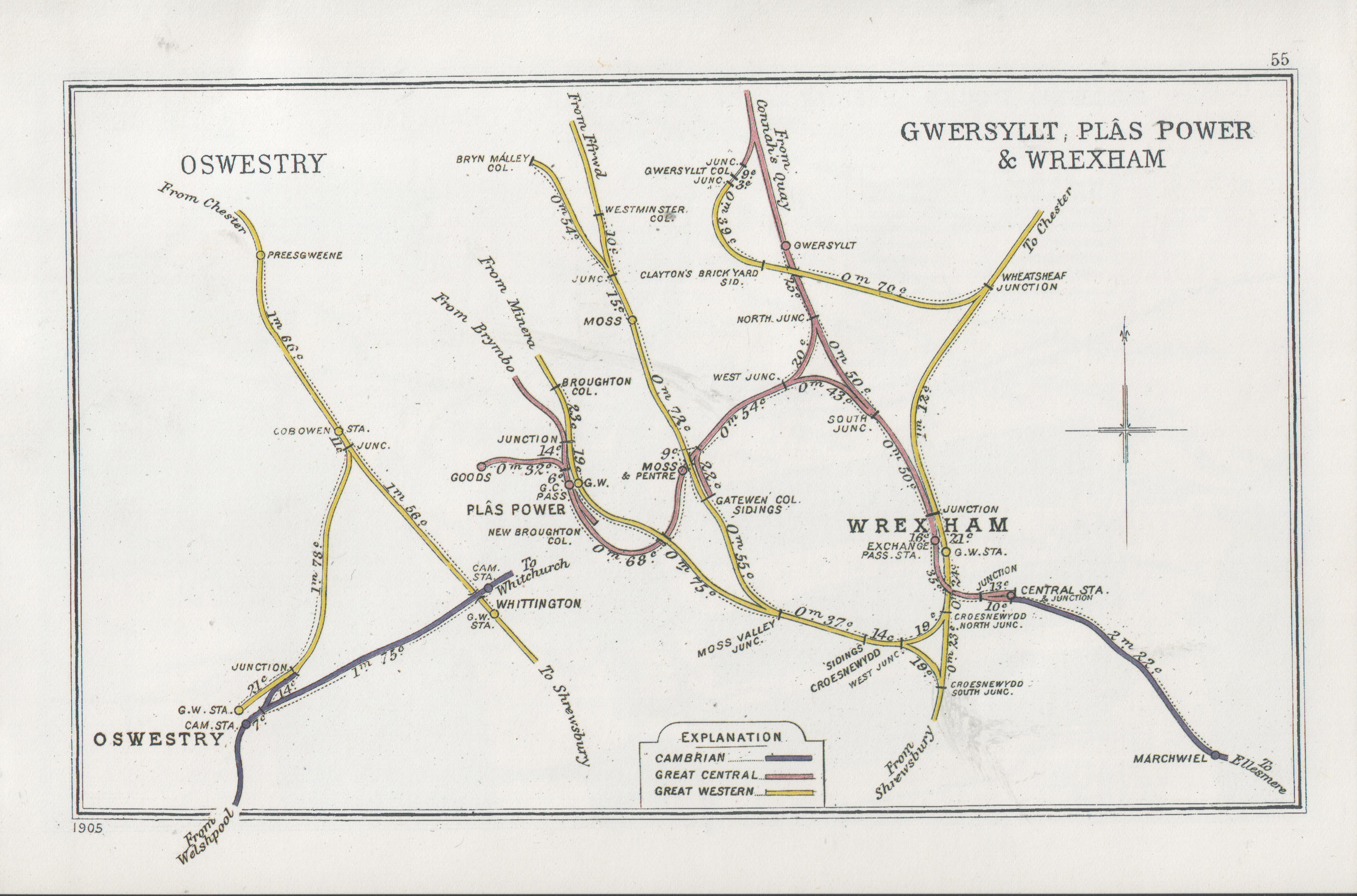
Oswestry with Gwersyllt, Plas Power and Wrexham on the Railway Clearing House map.
