= Llanymynech railway station =

Former railway station in England

Llanymynech
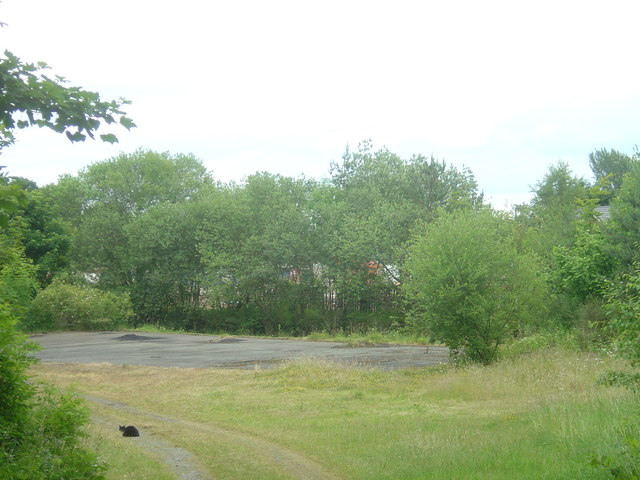
- The former goods yard of Llanymynech railway station

General information
- Location: Llanymynech, Shropshire; England
- Coordinates: 52.7812°N 3.0822°W
- Grid reference: SJ271209
- Platforms: 4

Other information
- Status: Disused

History
- Original company: Oswestry and Newtown Railway
- Pre-grouping: Cambrian Railways
- Post-grouping: Great Western Railway

Key dates
- 1 May 1860: Opened
- 18 January 1965: Closed
Location

Llanymynech railway station was an important junction station on the Cambrian Railways mainline from Welshpool, Powys to Oswestry, Shropshire, serving the village of Llanymynech which is partly situated in Shropshire, England and partly in Powys, Wales.

== Construction ==
The Oswestry and Newtown Railway was authorised by an Act of Parliament in 1855, but delays in securing land, shortage of money and contractors going bankrupt delayed construction. Supported by the London and North Western Railway (LNWR), it had agreed to a joint station with the Newtown and Machynlleth Railway in Newtown, Powys. Despite all the difficulties the O&NR was the first railway company to reach Oswestry, where it made its headquarters, on 1 May 1860.

== Layout ==
The O&NR constructed a simple two-platform station southeast of Llanymynech, plus an adjacent goods yard, to enable shipping of locally quarried limestone, and created products of quick lime and lead. However, under its Act of Parliament, it had agreed not to disturb the operations of the existing local tramways or canals, and hence access across each would either be over (bridge) or under (aqueduct).

The Hoffmann kilns were located on the opposite side of the canal to the chosen station site, and if accessed on the level would have required an aqueduct to be built under the canal. Not having the money to achieve this, the O&NR agreed to junction with the local tramways north of its station at "Rock Siding". It hence built a bay platform on the northwest side of the station, from which line extended to the "Rock Siding". To access the Hoffmann kilns, trains would firstly enter the bay, then reverse up the slope to the "Rock Siding", where they would then change direction again by pulling forward over a bridge to the Hoffmann kilns.

== Llanfyllin Branch ==
Having been merged into the Cambrian Railways (CR) in 1860, in 1863 it had an Act of Parliament approved to build the Llanfyllin Branch, to access limestone quarries along the valley to the regionally important market town of Llanfyllin. However, the same restriction on access was in place, meaning that the LB was accessed by the same route via the "Rock Siding", and hence passing the Hoffmann kilns.

== Potteries, Shrewsbury and North Wales Railway ==
The last piece of rail transport to arrive in Llanymynech was the Potteries, Shrewsbury and North Wales Railway (known as the Potts), which ran from Shrewsbury Abbey. To access its Nantmawr branch for similar mineral extraction purposes, it ran under the O&NR via a bridge south of the station, and the canal via an aqueduct.

However, the Potts ran into financial difficulties, and services were suspended in June 1880. On 28 January 1881 the CR came to an agreement with the Potts receiver and its Chief Engineer Richard Samuel Francis (who also owned the mineral rights along the Nantmawr valley), to maintain the stunted Nantmawr branch. The CR would pay a royalty of 3d per ton, which was renewed but the toll was reduced to 2d a ton in January 1886.

Access to the Nantmawr branch was again via the "Rock Siding", and it junctioned from the Llanfyllin Branch just beyond the Hoffmann kiln at new station Carreghofa Halt.

=== 1911-1961 ===
Revived as one of Colonel Stephens Railways under the title of the Shropshire and Montgomeryshire Light Railway in 1911, the new company added a few more stations but it did not prosper, and in 1941 was taken over by the War Department/Ministry of Defence, to create Central Ammunition Depot Nesscliffe.

Designed, constructed and operated by the Royal Engineers, they built extensive additional service tracks along the 8.75 miles (14.08 km) of line from Maesbrook to the former Ford and Crossgate railway station, south of the River Severn. The site was made up of four sub-sites: Kinnerley; Pentre; Ford; and Argoed; in total capable of storing around 50,000 tonnes (55,000 tons) of shells. This created far more additional traffic for Llanymynech station, with Shrewsbury Abbey still not connected to the mainline.

There was also a sub-site at Loton Park, under the Alberbury medieval deer park, used for storage of both Incendiary ammunition and chemical weapons shells from 1943. This was one of two chemical warfare depots operated in co-operation with and guarded by the United States Army Air Forces, the second being in Shepton Mallet, Somerset.

Locomotives and train drivers were provided by the Royal Engineers, who also maintained the extensive network. Their main servicing depot for rolling stock was on the stub-junction of the former branchline to Criggion. After the closure of CAD Nesscliffe in 1959, the railway tracks were removed and the line closed in 1961.

== Closure of the "Rock Siding" ==
On 11 April 1894 the CR agreed to build a 0.5-mile (0.80 km) deviation from the Llanfyllin branch to join the Nantmawr branch at Wern. This enabled the CR to access the Potts aqueduct under the canal, and hence stop use of the "Rock Siding" with immediate effect. The CR also agreed to junction the Potts on the level with the CR mainline north of Llanymynech station.

The Nantmawr branch reopened as a Cambrian subsidiary on 1 January 1896, and the deviation to the Llanfyllin branch followed on 27 January. The reconstruction at Llanymynech required the addition of new through platforms on the northeast side for access by the Potts. Trains to/from Llanfyllin had a cross over installed south of the station, enabling access to any platform.

A lease for 99 years followed on 12 April 1900, with the CR paying £555 a year: half itself, half from the Tanat Valley Light Railway which opened on 5 January 1904.

After signing the agreement, the CR completed a loopline by extending the junction with the Nantmawr branch line through the new Porthywaen Halt, connecting with the Porth-y-waen branch, and then reconnecting northwards with the mainline towards Oswestry at Llynclys Junction.

The "Rock Siding" continued to serve the kilns until their closure in 1914, after which it was used to store redundant wagons. The siding was removed in 1939.

== Signalling ==
There were two signal boxes for Llanymynech, one immediately to the north, and one on the loopline junction south of the station, where the CR mainline became single track to Welshpool, just before crossing the River Vyrnwy.

As part of the agreement for the Potts deviation, the GWR rebuilt the northern signal box in 1895. There were two road bridges north of Llanymynech, making visibility of trains approaching from Oswestry potentially difficult from a standard height signal box. They hence built a customised signal box with a floor height of just 8 feet 2 inches (2.49 m) above rail level, enabling a signal man of average height to see the complete station view.

== Closure ==
The station was allocated and operated by the Great Western Railway from the implementation of the Railways Act 1921, and kept under their successor company on nationalisation in 1948 under British Railways.

In 1963, the former CR mainline was reallocated to become part of the London Midland Region. In the review under the Beeching Axe the Cambrian Railway mainline was decreed uneconomic and the line closed to passengers in 1965.

Freight services continued to run on the Gobowen, Oswestry to Llynclys Junction section until 1988, to access the Llanyblodwel quarry on the Nantmawr branch.

== Present ==
The station was demolished soon after the railway tracks were removed, relaid under tarmac as a heavy goods vehicle carpark, the abandoned state in which it remains today.

The single line, which allowed stone trains to run from Gobowen to Llanyblodwel until 1988, remains in place. It, together with a section south of Llynclys is part of an ambitious plan by the Cambrian Heritage Railways to restore services from Gobowen to the new Penygarreg Lane Halt and possibly beyond.

Preceding station	Disused railways	Following station
Four Crosses; Line and station closed	Cambrian Railways; Oswestry and Newtown Railway	Pant (Salop); Line and station closed
Carreghofa Halt; Line and station closed	Cambrian Railways; Llanfyllin Branch	Terminus
Llanyblodwel; Line and station closed	Shropshire and Montgomeryshire Railway; Potteries, Shrewsbury and North Wales Railway	Maesbrook; Line and station closed
