= Rail transport in Shropshire =

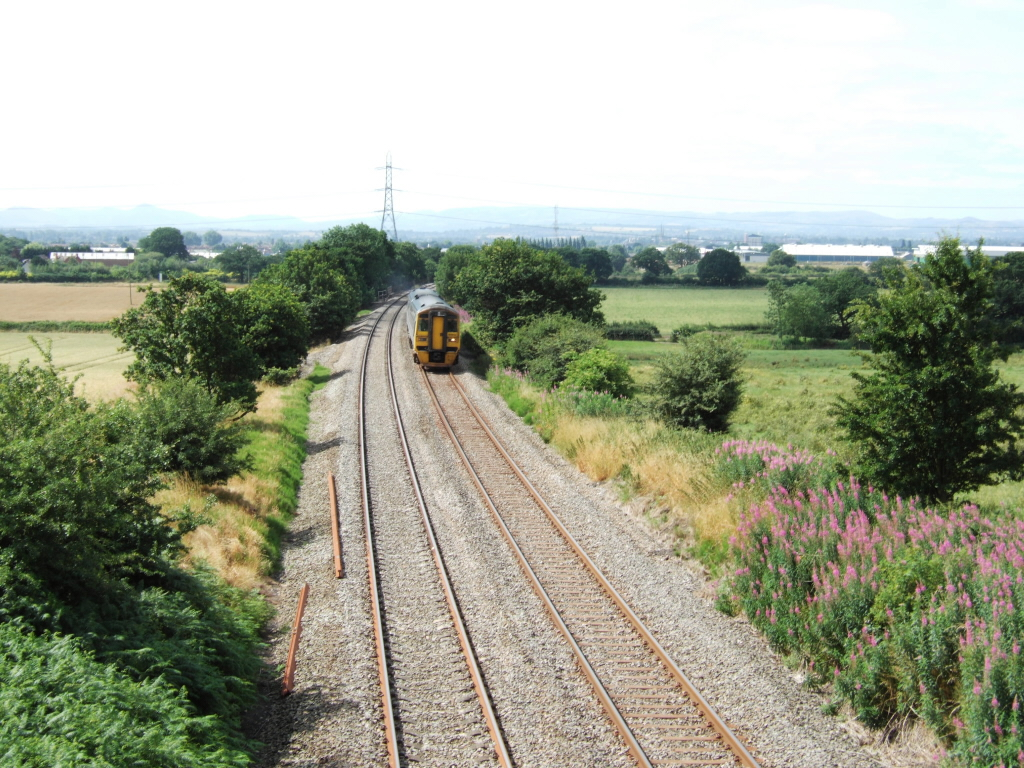
A DMU heads north towards Whitchurch and Cheshire on the Welsh Marches Line at Battlefield.

The English county of Shropshire has a fairly large railway network, with 19 National Rail stations on various national lines; there are also a small number of heritage and freight lines, including the famous heritage Severn Valley Railway running along its eastern border with Worcestershire.

The majority of the county's public rail services are run by Transport for Wales Rail; the remainder are run by West Midlands Trains (under their West Midlands Railway brand) and Avanti West Coast.

== National Rail services ==
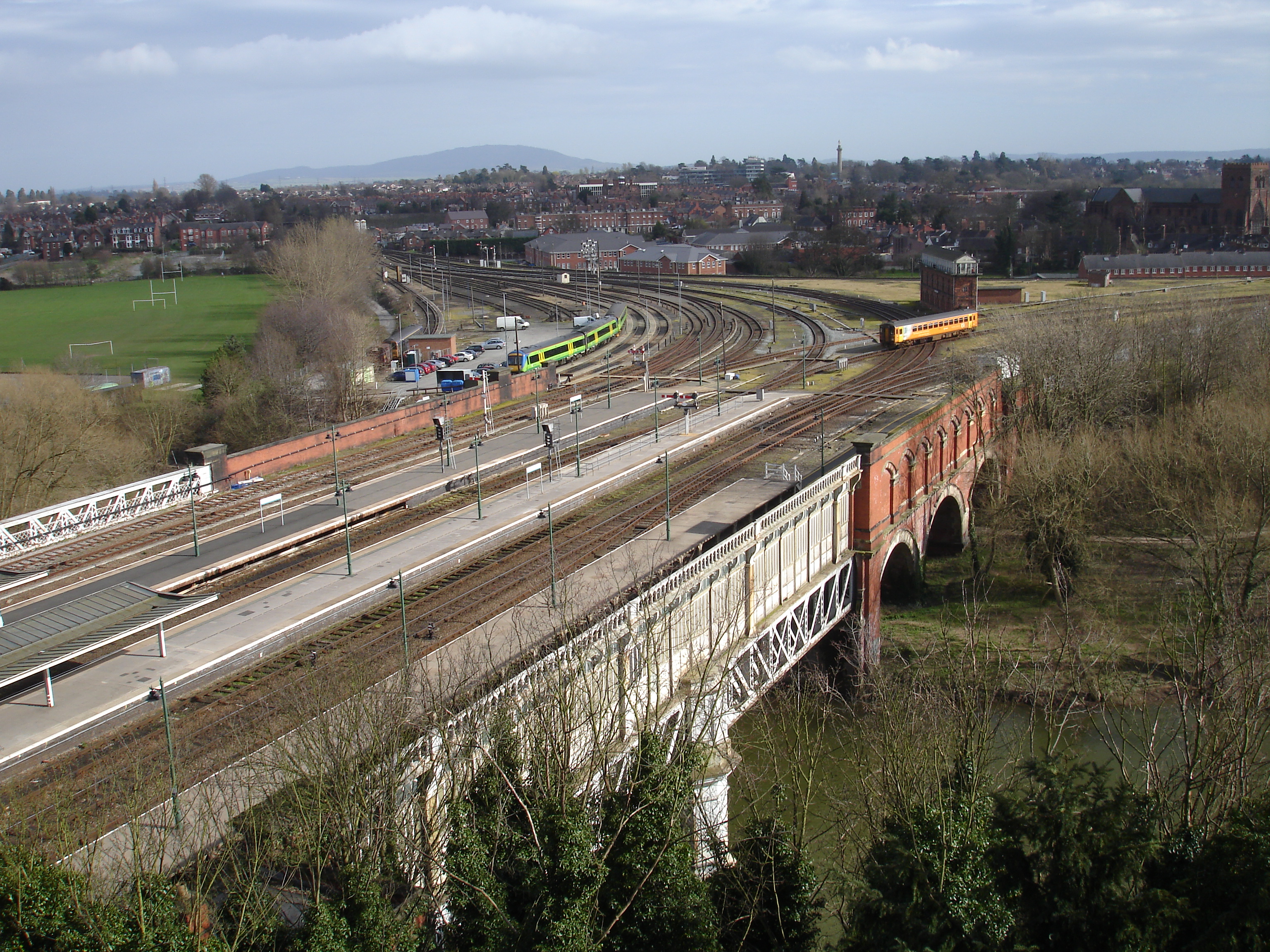
Severn Bridge Junction, the busiest in the county, south of Shrewsbury railway station.

National Rail services in Shropshire are centred about Shrewsbury station (all other 'national rail' stations in Shropshire have a direct train service to Shrewsbury, which is the county town), which is managed by Transport for Wales. The station is at the junction of the Wolverhampton to Shrewsbury Line, Shrewsbury to Chester Line, the Welsh Marches Line (between Cardiff and Manchester) and the Cambrian Line (towards Welshpool). Craven Arms station is at the junction between the Welsh Marches Line and the Heart of Wales Line, although services on the Heart of Wales Line begin at Shrewsbury rather than Craven Arms itself. There are direct train services from Shrewsbury (and elsewhere in the county) to the cities of Manchester, Birmingham and Cardiff, as well as the port at Holyhead where regular ferries to Dublin depart.

There are no electrified railways, as such, in the county despite the surrounding railway nodes of Crewe, Chester and Wolverhampton all being electrified (the funicular Bridgnorth Cliff Railway, although electrically powered, is cable worked). This has meant that since the mid-1990s rail privatisation, there has been a reluctance to establish a direct service to London by the cross-country railway companies (previously British Rail ran direct trains from Shrewsbury to London), notably Virgin Trains West Coast who previously ran services to London Euston from the county in 2000. There was a direct service to London Marylebone, provided by the open-access company Wrexham & Shropshire, which operated from 28 April 2008 to 28 January 2011 and used diesel locomotives. On 11 December 2014, Virgin Trains recommenced direct services between Shrewsbury and London Euston.

== Freight only lines ==
There are two freight only lines in operation in the Telford area. One is the line from Madeley Junction on the Shrewsbury to Wolverhampton Line to Ironbridge Power Station via the historic industrial area of Coalbrookdale. The other is the newly restored line from Wellington to the Telford International Railfreight Park in Donnington which links the Terminal at Donnington with the Shrewsbury to Wolverhampton Line.

There is also the short Abbey Loop line in Shrewsbury which is generally only used by freight trains.

Historically, after the closure of the 'Potts' Line in 1960, the former Shrewsbury Abbey Station became an Esso oil terminal. The line utilised a short stub of the closed Severn Valley line from Sutton Bridge Junction before being reversed and switched towards the terminal. The terminal was closed in July 1988 and the line was subsequently removed.

The Gobowen to Blodwell line, which runs through Oswestry, has been a mothballed line since the 1980s. It previously served a small number of stone quarries in the area. In 2008 the line was bought by Shropshire County Council and will likely be used in part by the Cambrian Heritage Railways being set up in the area (by the Cambrian Railways Trust and Society, see Heritage section below) and also as a cycle path from Oswestry to Gobowen.

== Former railways ==
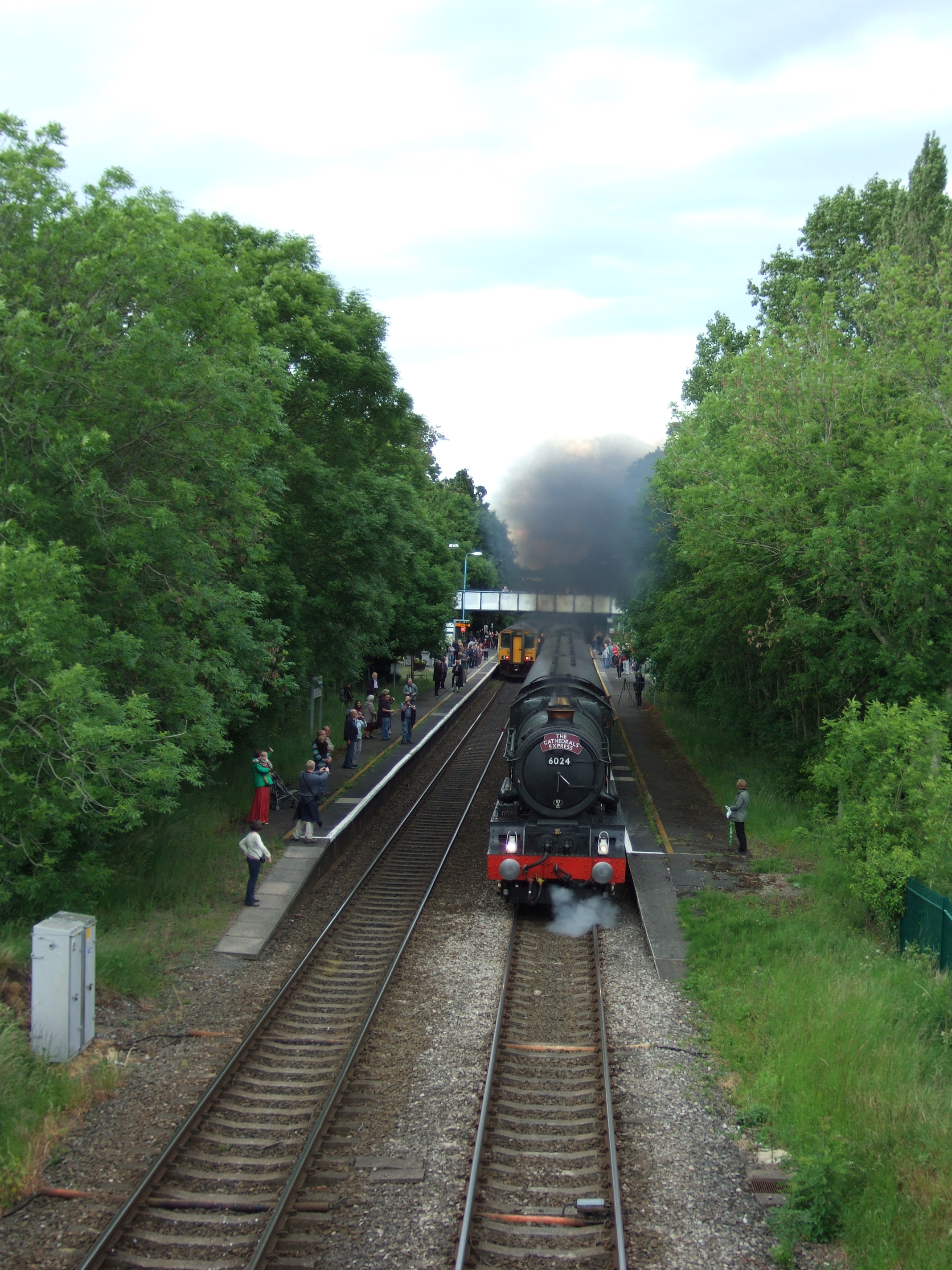
A steam charter train heads through Church Stretton on the Welsh Marches Line, passing a regular DMU service.

There are many closed lines in Shropshire, including

- Tenbury and Bewdley Railway which ran from the now-closed Woofferton station on the Shrewsbury to Hereford line and passing briefly through Herefordshire through Tenbury Wells, Cleobury Mortimer, and then into Worcestershire to Bewdley
- Cleobury Mortimer and Ditton Priors Light Railway
- Bishop's Castle Railway was a 19 1/2 mile line running from just north of Craven Arms station to Bishop's Castle
- Severn Valley Railway; although part of the southern section has been restored, the line used to continue north from Bridgnorth to Sutton Bridge Junction in Shrewsbury
- Craven Arms station to Wellington via Much Wenlock and a junction with the Severn Valley Railway at Buildwas. A small section of this line has been reopened as the Telford Steam Railway. There was also a branch via Madeley to Shifnal.
- Shropshire and Montgomeryshire Railway (the 'Potts Railway'), an 18-mile line from Shrewsbury Abbey to Llanymynech with a branch to Criggion
- Minsterley branch line was a 9-mile line from Shrewsbury station to Minsterley, with a further branch to Snailbeach
- Stafford to Wellington line ran from Wellington to Stafford via Newport and Gnosall. Although closed in the 1960s, new track has been restored from east of Wellington to Donnington in 2008. It is hoped the next phase would be to reconnect Newport to the railway network. The line is in the top 36 'Lines that should reopen' listing published by the Campaign for Better Transport.
- Wellington to Nantwich in Cheshire, via Market Drayton, with another line running into Stoke-on-Trent in Staffordshire from Market Drayton
- Oswestry to Newtown, passing through Shropshire
- Oswestry, Ellesmere and Whitchurch Railway, a constituent line of the Cambrian Railways system
- The Tanat Valley Light Railway, running from Llanyblodwel up the Tanat valley to Llangynog in Powys
- Wrexham and Ellesmere Railway, a constituent line of the Cambrian Railways system which ran for a short distance within Shropshire
- Whitchurch and Tattenhall Railway which ran for a short distance in Shropshire before passing into Cheshire

Many were closed in the 1960s, although the county did not fare too badly under Dr Beeching's massive nationwide railway cuts. The Heart of Wales Line was saved from closure. However, some previously major railway centres in the county, such as Oswestry, Newport and Market Drayton, now have no public railways.

== Heritage railways ==
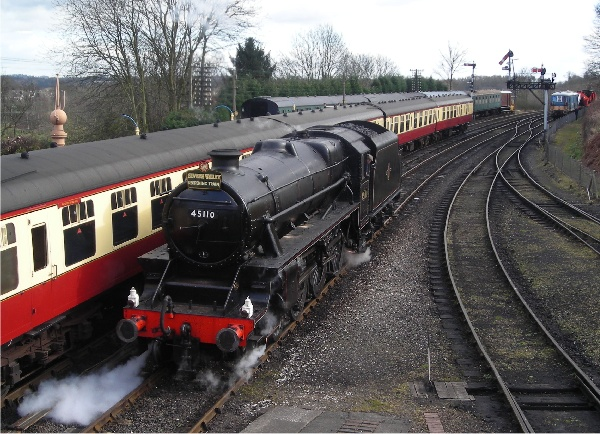
The Shropshire-Worcestershire Severn Valley Railway, at Bridgnorth.

There are three heritage railways in Shropshire: the Severn Valley Railway from Bridgnorth en-route to Kidderminster (in Worcestershire), the Telford Steam Railway at Horsehay & Dawley, and two restored stretches of the Cambrian Railways, being run by Cambrian Heritage Railways between Oswestry and Weston Wharf, and between Llynclys South and Penygarreg Lane in Pant.

Cambrian Heritage Railways also (since taking on the former Cambrian Railway Society CRS) aims to restore part of the Potteries, Shrewsbury & North Wales Railway at Nantmawr for use as a heritage railway. The CHR have a second operating base at Oswestry railway station, with a small collection of locos and rolling stock.

As well as the heritage only lines, the national lines of Shropshire witness a regular number of special charter trains with heritage diesel and steam locomotives and historic carriage stock in operation.

== Stations ==
Here are listed the 19 National Rail stations in current use in the county.

Station	Place	2015/16 usage	2016/17 usage	2017/18 usage	Managed by	Co-ordinates	Line	Distance from Shrewsbury	Platforms	Request stop?	DFT station category
Albrighton railway station	Albrighton	95,322	99,380	98,972	West Midlands Trains	52.63778°N 2.2683°W	Shrewsbury-Wolverhampton	35 km (21 3/4 miles)	2	No	F2
Broome railway station	Broome / Aston on Clun	1,564	782	1,150	Transport for Wales	52.423°N 2.885°W	Heart of Wales	36.5 km (22 3/4 miles)	1	Yes	F2
Bucknell railway station	Bucknell	5,696	5,516	4,324	Transport for Wales	52.3573°N 2.948°W	Heart of Wales	45.5 km (28 1/4 miles)	1	Yes	F2
Church Stretton railway station	Church Stretton	127,748	132,352	130,380	Transport for Wales	52.537°N 2.803°W	Welsh Marches	20.5 km (12 3/4 miles)	2	No	F1
Cosford railway station	Cosford (alight for DCAE Cosford & Air Museum)	81,530	84,384	87,626	West Midlands Trains	52.6448°N 2.3°W	Shrewsbury-Wolverhampton	32.5 km (20 1/4 miles)	2	No	F2
Craven Arms railway station	Craven Arms	109,478	100,914	96,996	Transport for Wales	52.442°N 2.837°W	Welsh Marches (junction with Heart of Wales)	32 km (20 mi)	2	No	F1
Gobowen railway station	Gobowen (alight here for a bus service to Oswestry)	213,900	221,138	218,684	Transport for Wales	52.8935°N 3.0371°W	Shrewsbury-Chester	28.5 km (17 3/4 miles)	2	No	E
Hopton Heath railway station^{1}	Hopton Heath	1,754	1,332	1,006	Transport for Wales	52.3915°N 2.912°W	Heart of Wales	41 km (25 1/2 miles)	1	Yes	F2
Knighton railway station	Knighton^{2}	21,626	20,714	21,440	Transport for Wales	52.345°N 3.042°W	Heart of Wales	52.5 km (32 1/2 miles)	2	No	F1
Ludlow railway station	Ludlow	299,776	299,802	300,742	Transport for Wales	52.371°N 2.716°W	Welsh Marches	44 km (27 1/2 miles)	2	No	E
Oakengates railway station	Oakengates	55,830	59,006	67,408	West Midlands Trains	52.693°N 2.450°W	Shrewsbury-Wolverhampton	21.5 km (13 1/2 miles)	2	No	F2
Prees railway station	near Prees	6,674	6,838	7,374	Transport for Wales	52.8992°N 2.6895°W	Welsh Marches	22.5 km (14.0 mi)	2	Yes	F2
Shifnal railway station	Shifnal	144,532	166,046	181,702	West Midlands Trains	52.666°N 2.372°W	Shrewsbury-Wolverhampton	28 km (17 1/4 miles)	2	No	F2
Shrewsbury railway station	Shrewsbury	1,979,248	2,087,820	2,211,520	Transport for Wales	52.712°N 2.75°W	Junction of several lines	n/a	5	No	C1
Telford Central railway station	Telford Town Centre	1,139,070	1,207,406	1,211,078	West Midlands Trains	52.681°N 2.441°W	Shrewsbury-Wolverhampton	23 km (14 1/4 miles)	2	No	C2
Wellington (Shropshire) railway station	Wellington	631,176	665,778	693,438	West Midlands Trains	52.7015°N 2.517°W	Shrewsbury-Wolverhampton	16 km (9.9 mi)	3	No	E
Wem railway station	Wem	100,678	105,044	110,636	Transport for Wales	52.856°N 2.719°W	Welsh Marches	17 km (10 3/4 miles)	2	No	F1
Whitchurch (Shropshire) railway station	Whitchurch	125,430	138,246	140,746	Transport for Wales	52.968°N 2.6716°W	Welsh Marches	30 km (18 3/4 miles)	2	No	F1
Yorton railway station	Yorton / Clive	9,304	8,788	7,686	Transport for Wales	52.809°N 2.736°W	Welsh Marches	11.5 km (7 1/4 miles)	2	Yes	F2

^{1} Sometimes written as "Hoptonheath".
^{2} Although the town of Knighton is in Powys, Wales, the railway station is in Shropshire, England.

== Tunnels ==
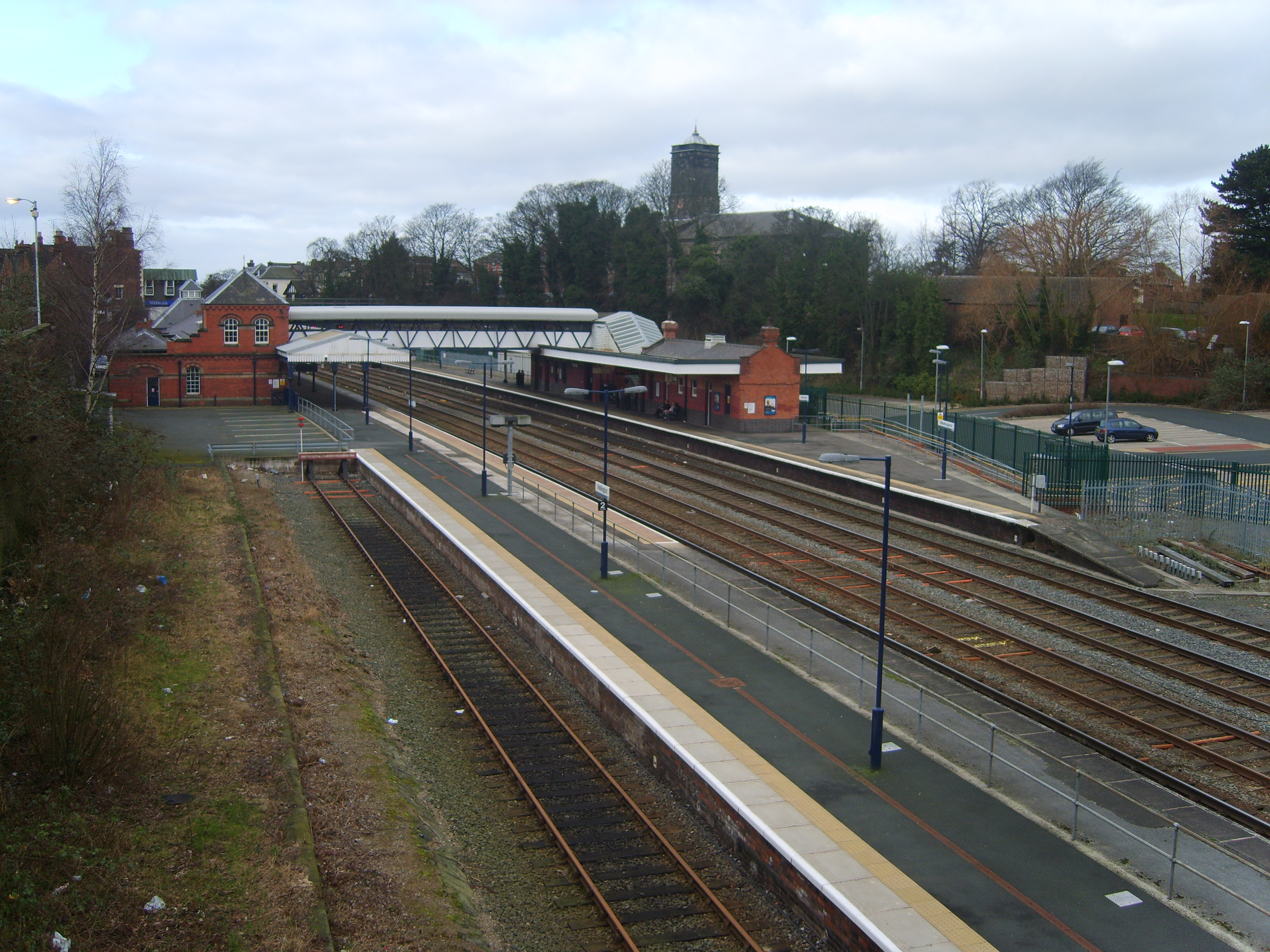
Wellington's railway station, with its 3 remaining platforms.

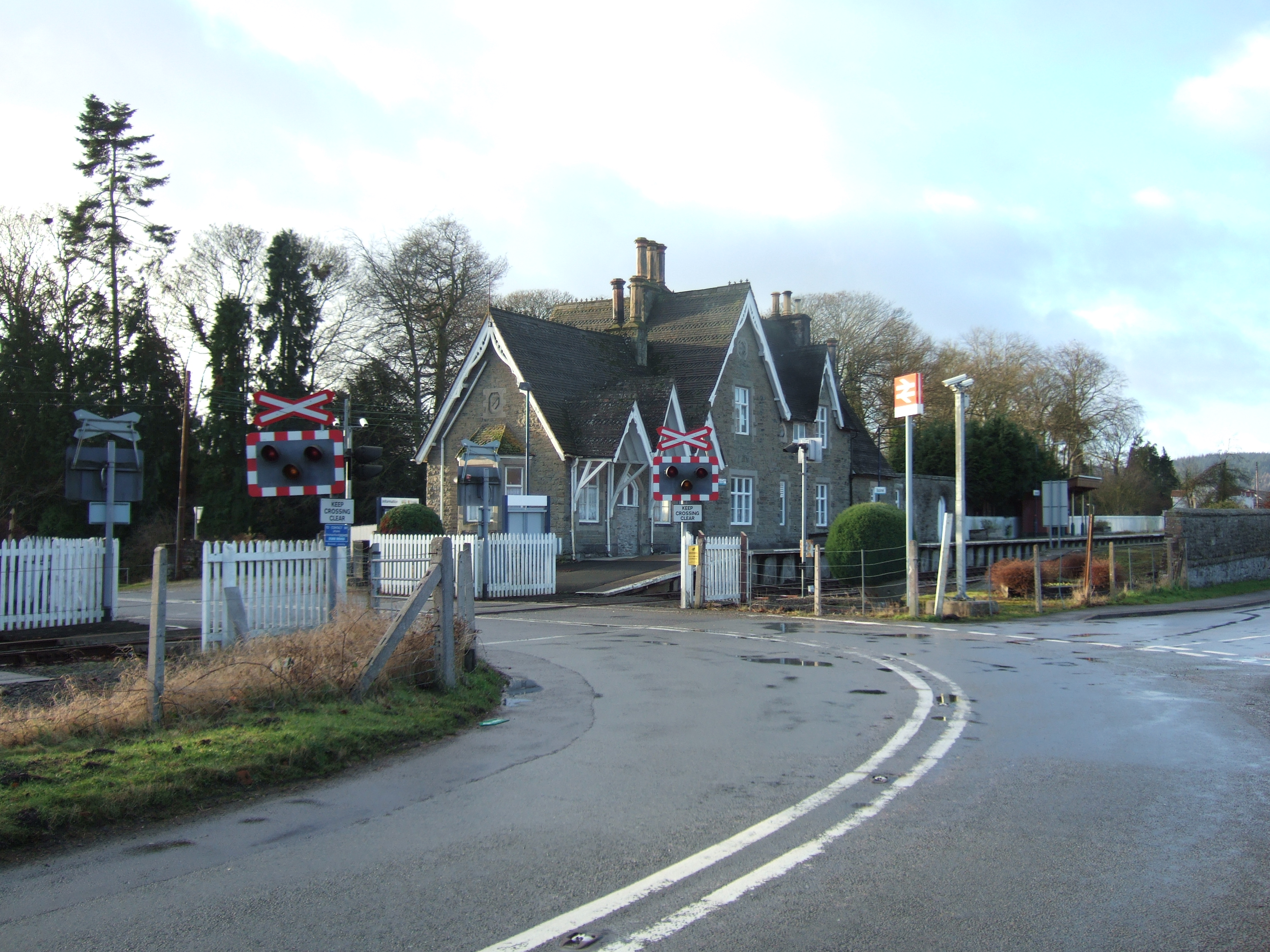
The small rural station at Bucknell, which has a level crossing at one end.

There are four railway tunnels in use at present in Shropshire:

- Oakengates Tunnel - the longest tunnel in the county, located between Oakengates and Telford Central stations, on the Shrewsbury to Wolverhampton Line
- Ludlow Tunnel - a short tunnel just to the south of Ludlow station, on the Welsh Marches Line
- Heath Hill Tunnel - located between Lawley Common and Horsehay on the Telford Steam Railway, this tunnel was reopened to trains with track relayed through it in early 2009, as part of the heritage railway's northward extension to Lawley
- Knowlesands Tunnel - a very short tunnel on the Severn Valley Railway, located between Bridgnorth and Hampton Loade

A notable disused tunnel exists running beneath High Town of Bridgnorth, which once carried the railway from Bridgnorth station northwards towards the Ironbridge Gorge. The tunnel continues to be maintained and is in good condition. There is the possibility of the Severn Valley Railway extending northwards through the tunnel, with the tunnel's owner BRB (Residuary) Ltd offering the heritage railway first refusal, however there would be substantial difficulties in reinstating the railway beyond the tunnel to the north of Bridgnorth.

== See also ==
- Rail transport in Great Britain
- History of rail transport in Great Britain
