= Llynclys South railway station =

Railway station in Shropshire, England

Coordinates: 52.8078°N 3.0638°W

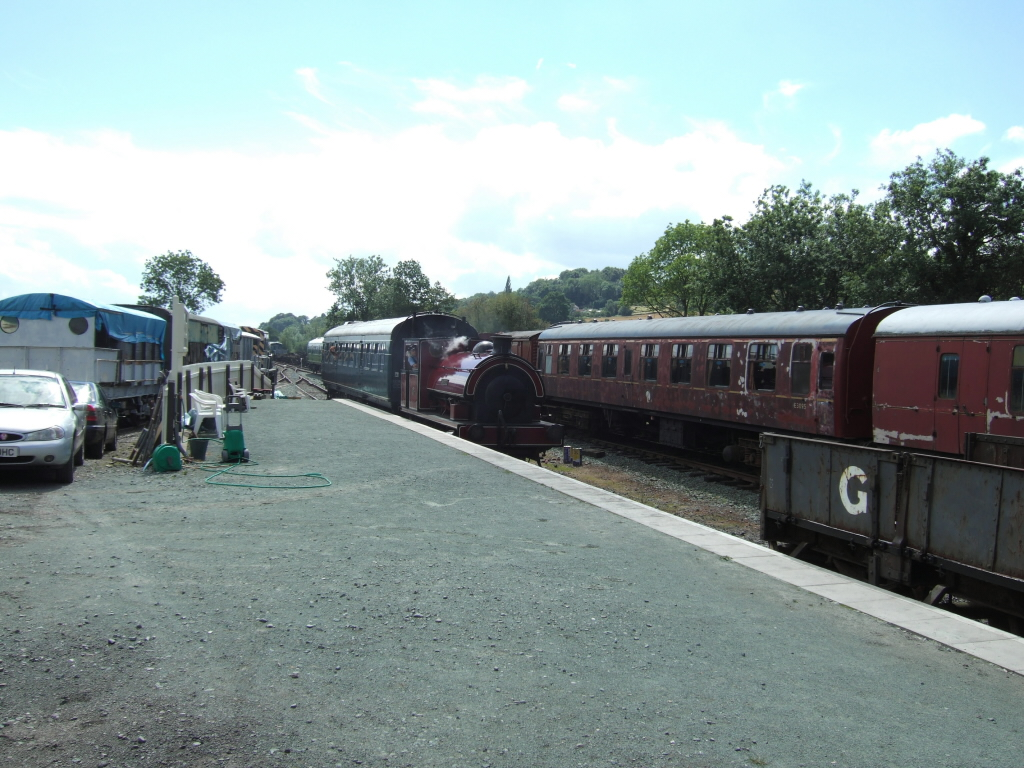
A passenger train arrives at Llynclys South, passing through the Trust's rolling stock, having returned from Penygarreg Lane halt.

Llynclys South is a railway station on the Cambrian Heritage Railways' (CHR) line in Shropshire.

It is located in the heart of the village of Llynclys, just south of Llynclys station, on the other side of the B4396 road bridge. During the original commercial operation of the line, the site was used for goods handling.

The station was built as an alternative to the original Llynclys station, which has become a private house. Work on the South station began in 2004 and opened to the public in 2005. CHR currently keeps the bulk of its rolling stock here, on a number of sidings, and a new carriage shed is set to be built after having gained planning permission in 2007.

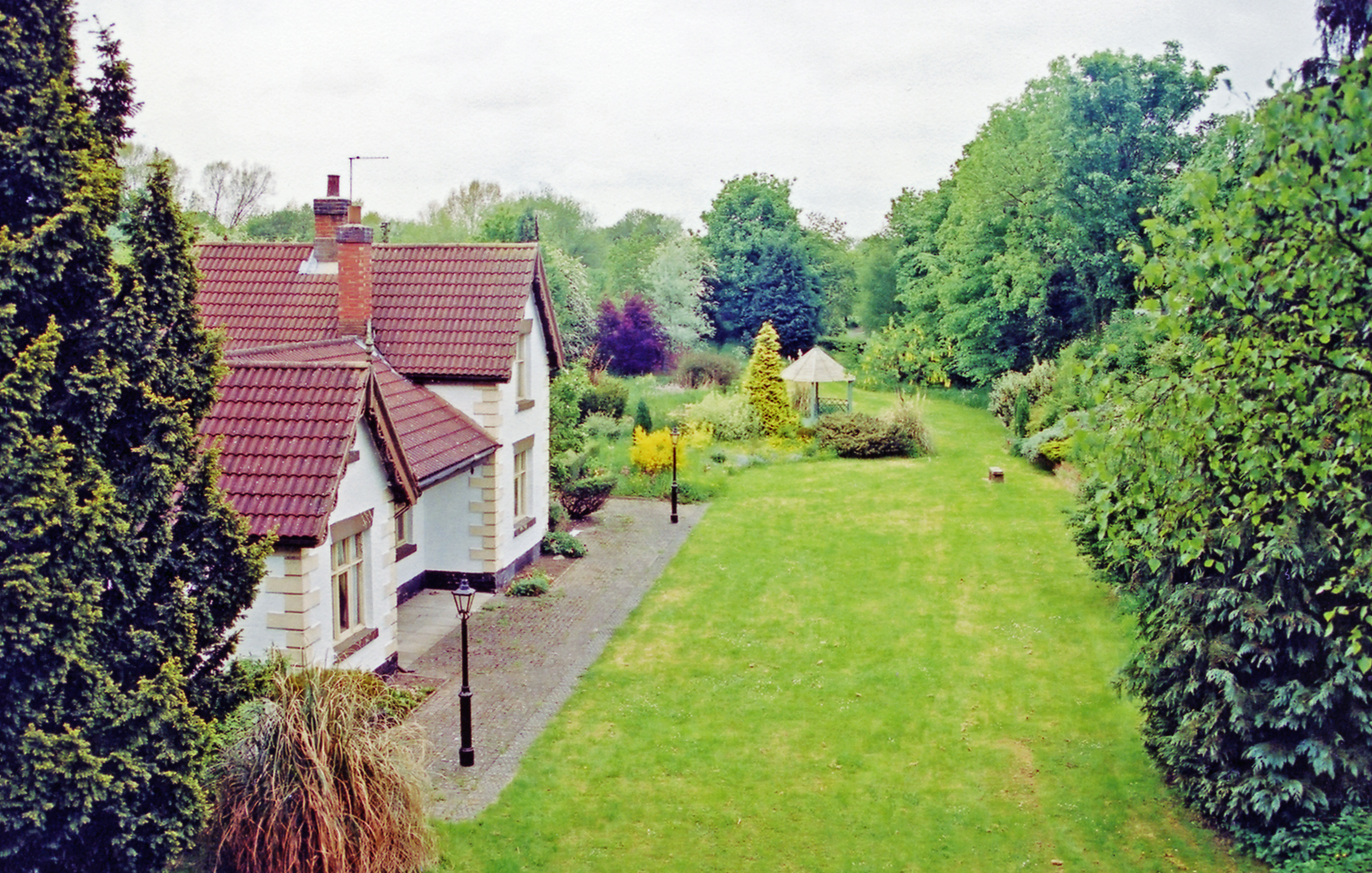
The remains of the original station

A notable historic feature of the site is the surviving bridge abutments from the narrow gauge Crickheath Tramway. Built under powers contained in the Montgomeryshire Canal Act 1794 (34 Geo. 3. c. 39), the 3 ft (914 mm) gauge line ran from the canal wharf at Crickheath to Porthywaen and was approximately two and a half miles (4 km) long. It shut in 1932. Towards the bottom of the station's access drive, a small length of 2 ft 6 in (762 mm) track with a display of wagons serves as tribute to the tramway.

Preceding station	Heritage railways	Following station
Penygarreg Lane Halt Terminus	Cambrian Heritage Railways Penygarreg Lane–Llynclys South section	Terminus
