= Park Hall Halt railway station =

Former railway station in England

Park Hall Halt

General information
- Location: Oswestry, Shropshire; England
- Coordinates: 52.8826°N 3.0378°W
- Grid reference: SJ302321
- Platforms: 1

Other information
- Status: Disused

History
- Original company: Great Western Railway
- Post-grouping: Great Western Railway

Key dates
- 5 July 1926: Opened
- 7 November 1966: Closed
Location

Park Hall Halt railway station was a station near Oswestry, Shropshire, England. It was on the 2½-mile Gobowen to Oswestry branch of the Great Western Railway, which was originally opened by the Shrewsbury and Chester Railway.

The station was opened on 5 July 1926 to serve the adjoining Robert Jones and Agnes Hunt Orthopaedic Hospital near Gobowen (whose land was in the triangle between the Oswestry branch line and the Chester mainline), and closed on 7 November 1966 under the Beeching cuts.

The name derived from Park Hall, located about ½ mile to the south-east.

In March 2021, the then North Shropshire MP Owen Paterson visited the site of the former Park Hall Halt, following initial discussions with Cambrian Heritage Railways regarding reopening the Oswestry to Gobowen line. He stated that the restoration of the short ½-mile section between Gobowen and Park Halt would be “unbelievably easy” to achieve, given that "You can still see the platform, the bridge looks in good order and all the track is even there."

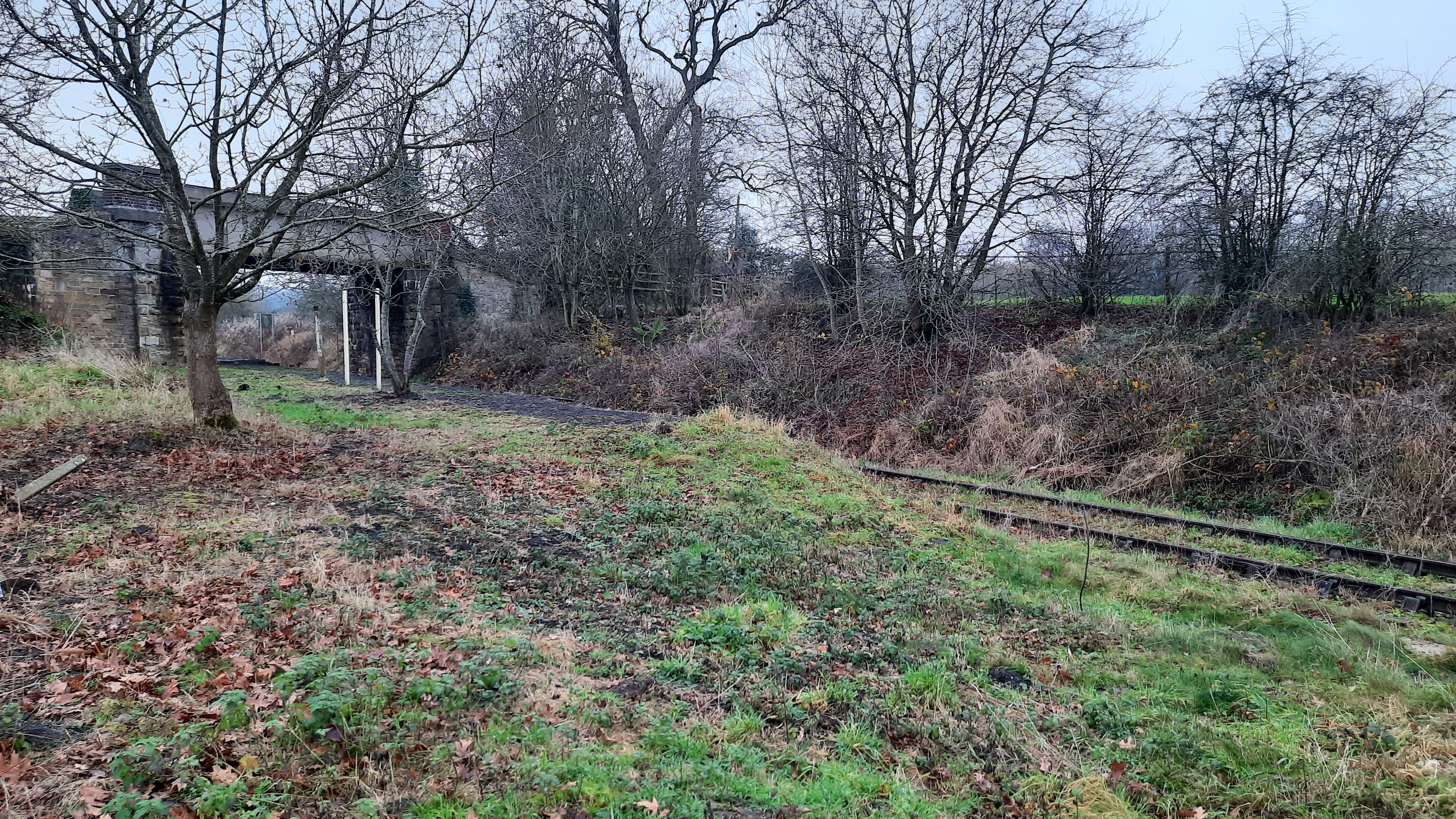
The former Park Hall Halt, viewed from the hospital grounds

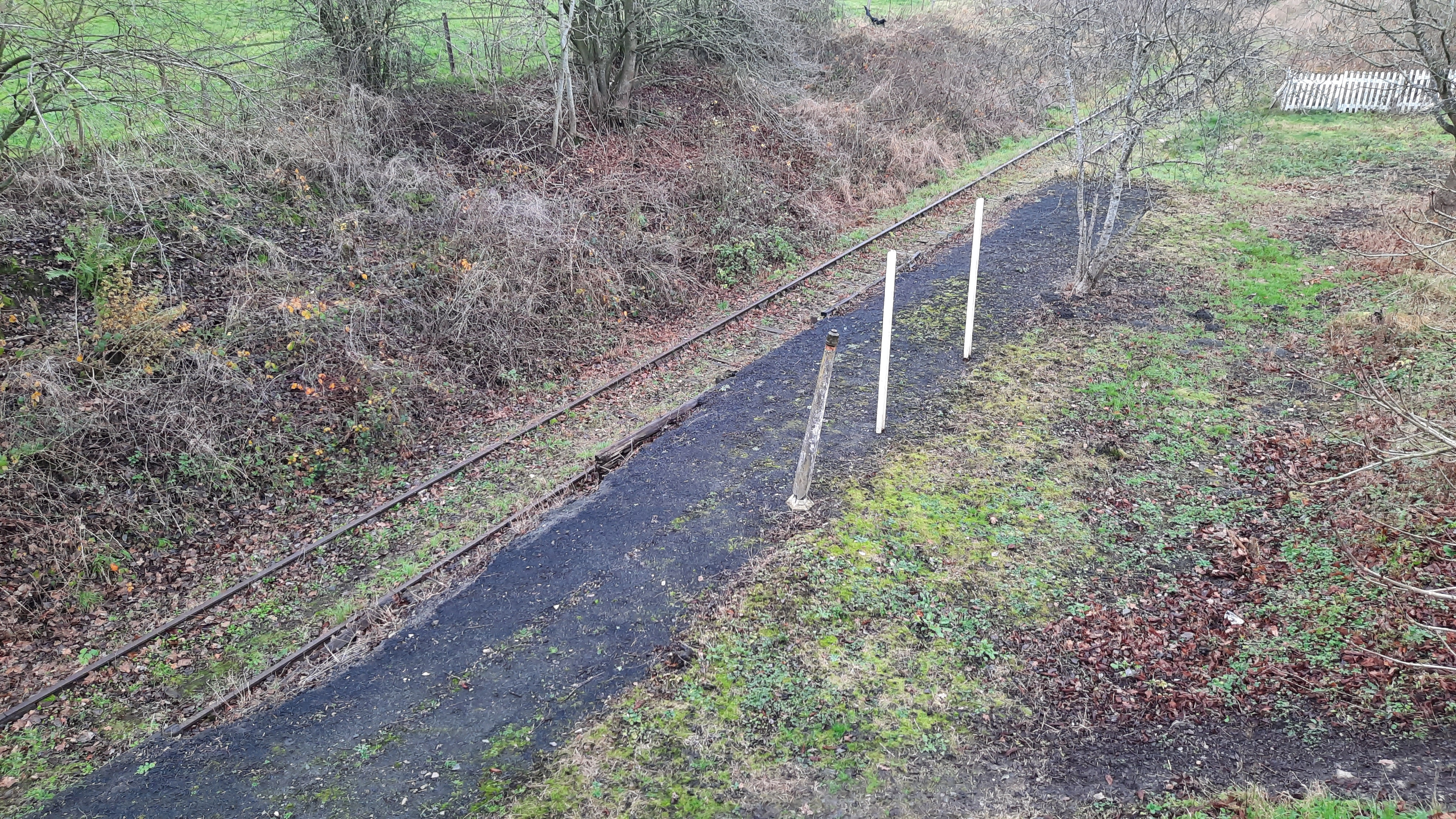
The former Park Hall Halt, viewed from the bridge

== See also ==
- Cambrian Heritage Railways

| Preceding station | Disused railways | Following station |
|---|---|---|
| Oswestry; Line and station closed | Great Western Railway; Oswestry to Gobowen Branch | Gobowen; Line closed- station open |
