= Penygarreg Lane Halt railway station =

Railway station in Shropshire, England

Penygarreg Lane Halt

General information
- Location: Pant, Shropshire; England
- Coordinates: 52.7985°N 3.0697°W
- Grid reference: SJ280229
- System: Station on heritage railway
- Manager: Cambrian Heritage Railway
- Platforms: 1

Key dates
- Easter 2011: Opened to public
- 8 September 2012: Official opening
Location

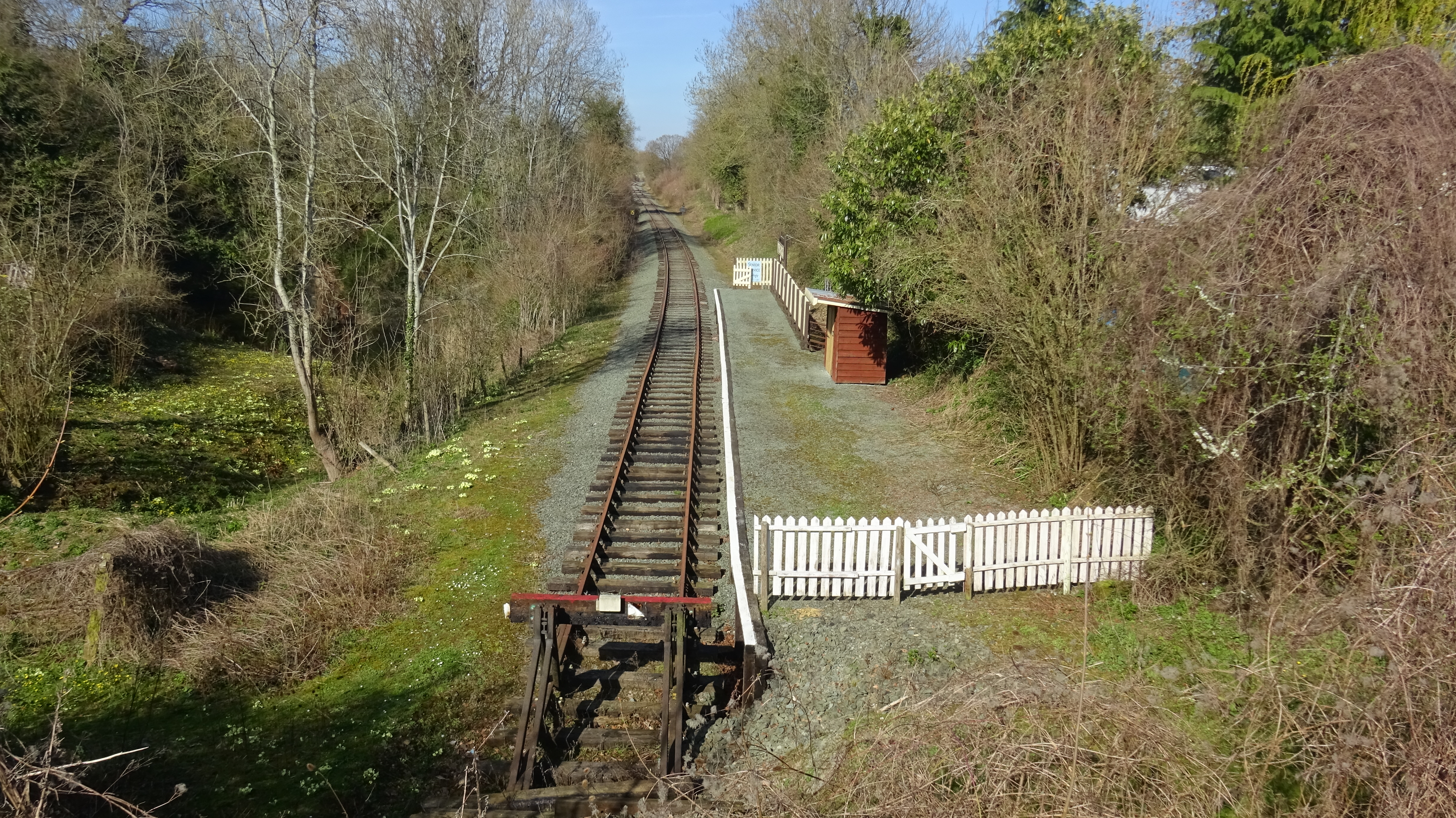
Penygarreg Lane Halt

Penygarreg Lane (or "Pen-y-garreg Lane") is a halt on the Cambrian Heritage Railways' line in Shropshire. It is on the northern edge of the village of Pant, north of the disused Pant station. Since 2021 trains stop at the constructed platform only to reverse back towards Llynclys and passengers cannot board or alight here.

== History ==
A planning application for the construction of a 25 m (82 ft) platform and a waiting shelter was submitted by Cambrian Heritage Railways to Oswestry Borough Council and subsequently was approved in February 2008. Preparation work began on the site in January 2010 and construction was underway through the summer of that year.

The Montgomery Canal, which is currently undergoing restoration in this area, runs alongside Penygarreg Lane where the pedestrian entrance to the halt was formerly situated. Pedestrian access via a permissive path between the lane and the halt was via the trackbed of a tramway which linked the railway line with the canal. This was closed in 2021 following a change of ownership of the land over which the trackbed runs. On the other side of the halt, right by the platform, is Piccadilly Pool. This is a remnant of the disused quarry once in operation here. Some small buildings once used by the quarry still exist in the area.

== Opening ==
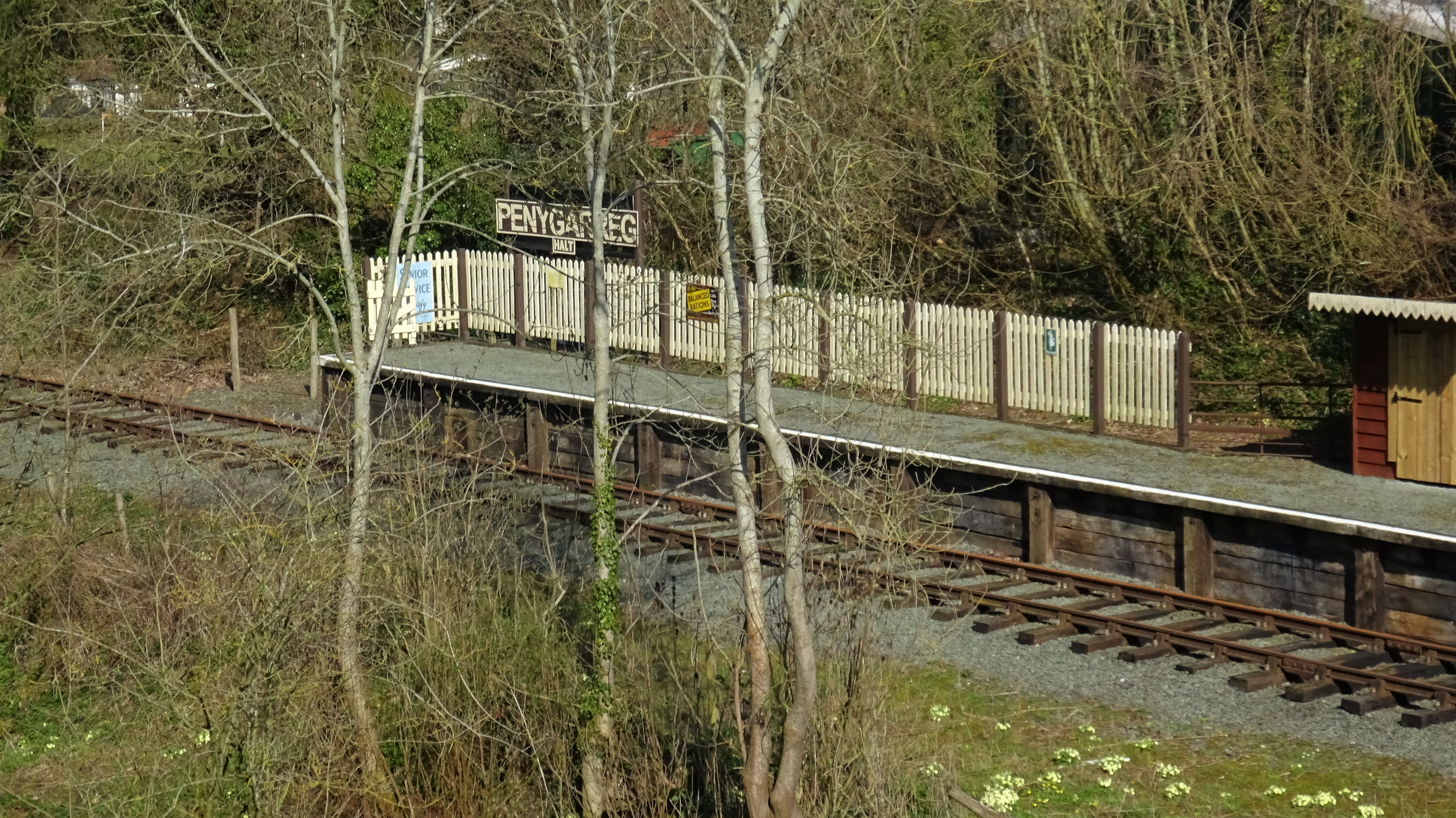
Penygarreg Lane Station

On Easter Saturday 2011 the newly built Pen-y-Garreg Lane station opened to the public, thus permitting a journey as well as a ride. Passengers were able to alight and take a walk around the area, with the Montgomery Canal and the village of Pant only a few minutes' walk away.

The station was officially opened by Councillor Arthur Walpole at 12:00 noon on Saturday 8 September 2012.

The station has already proved to be very popular with walkers and cyclists who use it as a starting point for local treks and cycle rides, returning later to Llynclys for refreshments and use of the free facilities. The station is the southern terminus of Cambrian Heritage Railways' line from Llynclys South.

Preceding station	Heritage railways	Following station
Terminus	Cambrian Heritage Railways Penygarreg Lane–Llynclys South section	Llynclys South Terminus
