= Restaurant Miniature Buffet =

British Railways Mark 1 coach

British Rail Restaurant Miniature Buffet
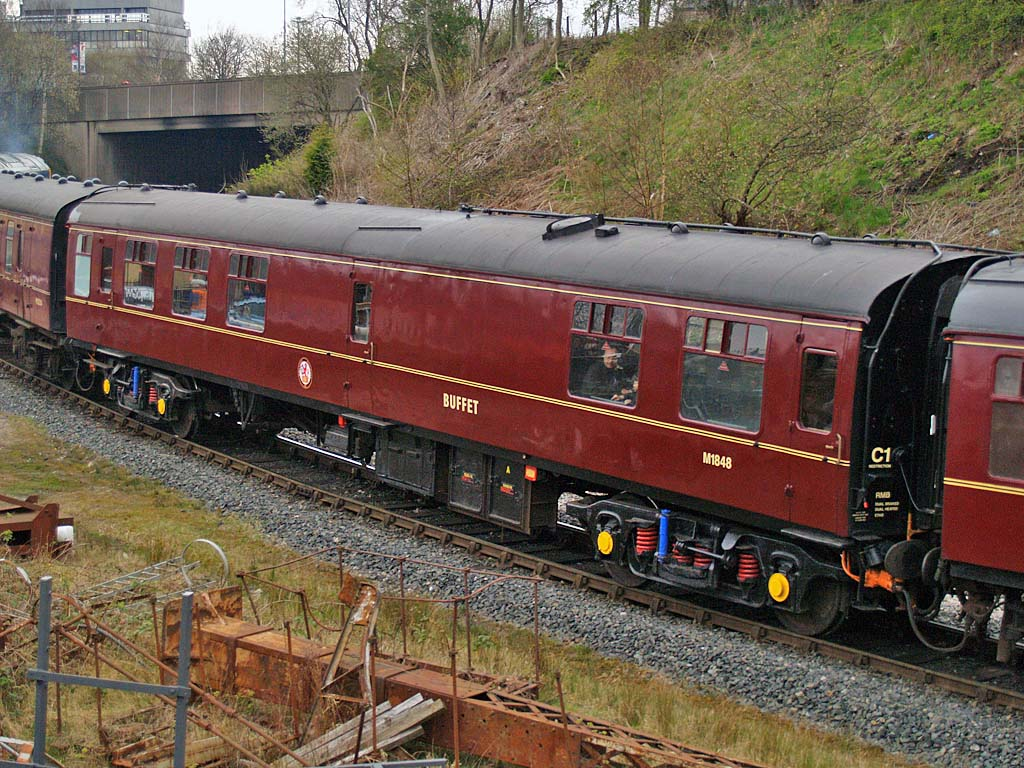
- RMB M1848 on the East Lancashire Railway
- In service: 1957–
- Manufacturer: York Works (12); Wolverton Works (70)
- Family name: British Railways Mark 1
- Constructed: 1957–1962
- Number built: 82
- Fleet numbers: 1801–1882
- Capacity: 48 or 44 seats
- Operators: British Rail

Specifications
- Car length: 64 ft 6 in (19.66 m)
- Width: 9 ft 3 in (2.82 m)
- Height: 12 ft 9 1/2 in (3.90 m)
- Maximum speed: 90–100 mph (145–161 km/h)
- Weight: 34.5–38 tonnes (34.0–37.4 long tons; 38.0–41.9 short tons)
- HVAC: Dual steam and electric – ETH 3, Cooking by bottled gas
- Bogies: BR1, Commonwealth or B4
- Braking system(s): Vacuum, air, or both
- Coupling system: Drop-head knuckle coupler on draw-hook (dual)
- Track gauge: 4 ft 8 1/2 in (1,435 mm)

The Restaurant Miniature Buffet (or RMB) is a British Railways Mark 1 railway coach. It is a Tourist Standard Open (TSO) coach with two full seating bays next to the centre transverse vestibule removed and replaced with a buffet counter and customers standing space, and one bay on one side (same side as the buffet counter) removed and replaced with a store cupboard on the other side of the centre vestibule. They were built in five lots from 1957 to 1962.

Lot No.	Diagram	Built	Builder	Qty	Fleet numbers	Notes
30485	97	1957–1958	York	12	1801–1812	No store cupboard, 48 seats, BR1 Bogies
30507	98	1960	Wolverton	15	1838–1852	1851 fitted with B5 Bogies for EMU use, the rest fitted with Commonwealth bogies
30520	99	1960	Wolverton	25	1813–1837	Commonwealth bogies
30670	99	1961–1962	Wolverton	12	1853–1864	Commonwealth bogies
30702	99	1962	Wolverton	18	1865–1882	Commonwealth bogies

Quite a few still operate on the national network on Railtours, but not on service trains. A lot have made it into railway preservation and are used by many heritage railways in the UK. Even though the first batch had no store cupboard 1807 on the Watercress has been fitted with one and B4 Bogies.

== List of Preserved RMBs ==
Number	Location	Livery	Status	Notes
1802	Midland Railway - Butterley	Lined Maroon	Operational	
1803	Dean Forest Railway	Chocolate & Cream	Awaiting Overhaul	
1804	West Somerset Railway	BR maroon	Operational	Part of 'Quantock Belle' dining train
1805	Swindon and Cricklade Railway	Being repainted to BR Maroon	Operational	Being repainted as of 18 May 2019.
1807	Watercress Line	Malachite Green	Operational	
1808	Gloucestershire Warwickshire Railway	Chocolate & Cream	Operational	
1809	Colne Valley Railway	Crimson & Cream	Stored	
1811	Great Central Railway (Nottingham)	BR maroon	Operational	Previously based at the Gloucestershire Warwickshire Railway, where it was painted in Chocolate & Cream. Moved to Ruddington May 2009, where repainted into current livery.
1812	Ribble Steam Railway	Crimson & Cream	Operational	Owned by the Furness Railway Trust. Previously based at the Lakeside & Haverthwaite Railway. Moved to Ribble during November 2009, and entered service there in 2017 after refurbishment.
1813	Riviera Trains	Chocolate & Cream	Operational - Main Line	
1815	Bere Ferrers	Chocolate & Cream	Static - Restaurant	
1816	Battlefield Line Railway	Maroon	Static - Used as store	
1818	Bluebell Railway	BR(S) Green	Under Overhaul	
1823	North Yorkshire Moors Railway	Lined Maroon	Operational	Main line registered for Esk Valley Line only.
1824	Keighley and Worth Valley Railway	Crimson & Cream platform side, Plain Maroon other side	Static - Catering Vehicle at Oxenhope Station.	
1826	Embsay and Bolton Abbey Steam Railway	Lined Maroon	Operational	
1829	East Lancashire Railway	Crimson & Cream	Operational	Previously based at Dean Forest Railway, where it was used as Staff coach for 'Royal Forester' dining train. Moved to ELR December 2017 where repainted into current livery.
1832	Riviera Trains	Chocolate & Cream	Operational - Main Line	
1833	East Lancashire Railway	Lined Maroon	Operational	
1835	Peak Rail	Lined Maroon	Operational	
1836	Keighley and Worth Valley Railway	Lined Maroon	Operational	
1837	East Lancashire Railway	Lined Maroon	Operational	
1838	Bluebell Railway	BR(S) Green	Operational	
1839	Ribble Steam Railway	Lined Maroon	Operational	Previously based at Steamport Southport. Moved to Ribble Spring 1999.
1840	West Coast Railways	Lined Maroon	Operational - Main Line	Previously based at Mid Hants Railway, and used as part of their Main Line set. Moved to Carnforth circa 2006.
1842	Mid Norfolk Railway	Crimson & Cream	Operational	Previously in Main Line charter set use. Moved to Dereham June 2014 where repainted into current livery.
1845	Chinnor and Princes Risborough Railway	Chocolate & Cream	Operational	
1848	East Lancashire Railway	Lined Maroon	Operational	
1850	Cambrian Heritage Railways	Crimson & Cream	Static - Shop & Cafe at Llynclys	
1851	Watercress Line	Malachite Green	Operational	
1852	Great Central Railway	Malachite Green	Under overhaul	
1853	Severn Valley Railway	Crimson & Cream	Operational	
1854	Pontypool and Blaenavon Railway	Crimson & Cream	Operational	
1855	Severn Valley Railway	Lined Maroon	Operational	
1856	Severn Valley Railway	Maroon	Operational	Repainted from previous Chocolate & Cream livery during 2021-2022.
1857	Embsay and Bolton Abbey Steam Railway	Plain Maroon	Operational	
1859	Bo'ness and Kinneil Railway	Lined Maroon	Operational - Main Line	
1860	West Coast Railways	Lined Maroon	Operational - Main Line	
1861	West Coast Railways	Lined Maroon	Operational - Main Line	
1862	Midland Railway - Butterley	Crimson & Cream	Operational	
1863	Crewe LNWR Heritage Company	Chocolate & Cream	Under Overhaul	
1864	Spa Valley Railway	Chocolate & Cream	Operational	Previously based at Llangollen Railway. Moved to Spa Valley May 2021.
1865	Swanage Railway	Malachite Green	Static Catering Vehicle	
1866	Bo'ness and Kinneil Railway	Crimson & Cream	Operational	
1869	Kent and East Sussex Railway	Forest Green	Operational	
1871	East Lancashire Railway	Blue & Grey	Operational	Named 'Howson Bar', after benefactor whose legacy funded restoration.
1872	Nene Valley Railway	Blue & Grey	Awaiting Restoration	
1873	Bodmin and Wenford Railway	Crimson & Cream	Static - Catering Vehicle at Bodmin General	
1874	Ecclesbourne Valley Railway	Pullman Umber & Cream Platform side, Crimson & Cream other side	Static - Catering Vehicle at Wirksworth	Previously based at Bodmin & Wenford Railway. Moved to Wirksworth May 2022 where Platform side repainted into current livery.
1875	East Lancashire Railway	Pullman Umber & Cream	Static - Catering use at Rawtenstall Station	Previously used as a home at Rawtenstall.
1876	Gloucestershire and Warwickshire Railway	Lined Maroon	Operational	
1878	North Yorkshire Moors Railway	Lined Maroon	Operational	Main line registered for Esk Valley Line only. Previously based at Churnet Valley Railway. Moved to NYMR late 2016/early 2017, and into service there April 2019 after refurbishment.
1879	Wensleydale Railway	Lined Maroon	Operational	Previously based at Steamport Southport, Ribble Steam Railway, and Weardale Railway. Moved to Wensleydale February 2010.
1880	North Yorkshire Moors Railway	Blue & Grey	Under Overhaul	Previously based at East Lancashire Railway. Moved to NYMR April 2019.
1882	West Coast Railways	Lined Maroon	Operational - Main Line	Now numbered 99311.
