= Cambrian Heritage Railways =

Heritage railway in Shropshire, England

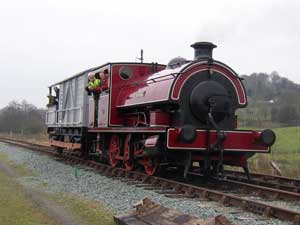
- Locale: Llynclys & Oswestry, Shropshire, England
- Terminus: Llynclys South & Weston Wharf

Commercial operations
- Name: Cambrian Railways
- Original gauge: 4 ft 8 1/2 in (1,435 mm) standard gauge

Preserved operations
- Operated by: Cambrian Heritage Railways
- Stations: 2 (Oswestry section); 2 (Llynclys section)
- Length: 62 chains, 0.78 mi, 1.2 km
- Preserved gauge: 4 ft 8 1/2 in (1,435 mm) standard gauge

Commercial history
- Opened: 1860
- Closed: 1965

Preservation history
- 2004: Restoration and relaying of track begin
- 2005: First trains run on newly restored (Llynclys section) of track
- 2011: First train service along restored (Oswestry section) of track
- 2012: Penygarreg Lane halt (Llynclys section) opens to the public, officially
- 2022: Weston station (Oswestry section) opens to the public, officially

The Cambrian Heritage Railways (CHR) is a heritage railway company, trust and society based at both Llynclys and Oswestry in its restored Oswestry railway station, Shropshire, England. It operates trains on two stretches of line: between Oswestry–Weston Wharf, and between Llynclys South–Penygarreg Lane Halt.

Formed after the 2009 merger of the Cambrian Railways Society (CRS) and the Cambrian Railways Trust (CRT), it aims to reinstate the infrastructure required to operate trains from Gobowen to Llynclys Junction (for Pant) and to Blodwel.

Cambrian Heritage Railways also operates the Cambrian Railways Museum in the Oswestry railway station's former goods depot. Displays include photographs, signs, lamps, signal box fittings and artefacts related to the history of the Cambrian Railways.

== History ==
In 1972, a group of enthusiasts established the Cambrian Railways Society, which obtained a lease from BR over the former Oswestry goods yard and Oswestry South Signalbox. The CRS established a museum in the former CR goods shed and acquired either directly, or through members, a number of steam and diesel engines plus associated rolling stock. In 1997, BR agreed to allow CRS to run trains under a light railway order to Middleton Road, over a track of 300 metres (980 ft) in length. The CRS then purchased the freehold of Weston Wharf goods yard and shed with the help of the Heritage Lottery Fund. After quarry trains finished in 1988, the CRS obtained further agreement from BR to run occasional works/inspection trains (i.e. non-passenger carrying, non-revenue earning) over the line to Blodwel.

In 1998, to secure the trackbed and return trains to the residual CR lines, a wider community group of the CRS, Oswestry Council and local business people formed the Cambrian Railways Trust, to acquire the railway between Gobowen and Blodwel. Once secured, the CRT would hand over the legal agreement to the CRS to actually run trains. In 1997, the CRT obtained funding to carry out a business study of the plans and subsequently agreed to purchase the track from Railtrack. By 2001, planning permission had been obtained for the entire project, along with a supporting business plan and funding.

However, after government-owned company Network Rail replaced Railtrack, they stopped negotiations and broke off the deal, stating that they would only deal with a local council. As a result, the CRS withdrew from the CRT and went back to new direct negotiations with Network Rail. After negotiations failed for a second time, the CRS established a third base on part of the Nantmawr branch at Llanddu Junction.

The enthusiasts left in CRT decided to embark on their own project, having been offered the freehold of the trackbed between Llynclys and Pant. After obtaining European Union grant aid through Oswestry Borough Council's tourism initiative, the trackbed was purchased by the council and leased to the CRT. From 2003/4, the CRT began rebuilding the track bed, which allowed trains to run from July 2005. Further grants from DEFRA and the EU allowed this small operation to expand, in both track as well as rolling stock assets. This culminated in the building of Llynclys South station.

In 2005, the council bought the semi-derelict Oswestry railway station, refurbishing it with grant aid to provide both a visitor and small business centre. It established the Oswestry Station Building Trust to manage the building and provide information on the old CR. Also in 2005 the CRT obtained via match-funding an HLF grant to establish a new business plan to reinstate the railway between Gobowen, Llynclys and Blodwel.

After completion of the study, the CRT proposed a merger with the CRS and the Oswestry Station Building Trust. This would enable: the assets of all three organisations to be merged; duplication of effort in restoring the railway to be removed; a revenue stream which would enable such efforts to continue; and a resultant organisation capable of obtaining monies to restore the railway at an earlier date. This was agreed to in 2009, resulting in the formation of the new trust company, Cambrian Heritage Railways'.

Through a ballot at an Extraordinary General Meeting held at Oswestry railway station on 20 November 2009, members of both the CRS and CRT agreed that:

- Every member of the CRS and CRT automatically becomes a member of the recently formed Cambrian Heritage Railways (CHR) Ltd
- The CRT and CRS work towards transferring assets from the CRT to CHR Ltd.; and
- Various functions of both groups be combined to avoid duplication of costs and efforts.

== Operations ==
The CHR currently operates trains on two stretches of line: between Oswestry–Weston Wharf, and between Llynclys South–Penygarreg Lane Halt on the former CRT Llynclys South to Pant line.

The CHR has moved the museum collections of the CRS into Oswestry station, while retaining the former goods shed as an engine and rolling stock restoration point. CHR is also restoring more of the railway infrastructure in Oswestry to operational condition, and since 2006 has restored the former Oswestry South Signal Box, thanks to a £22,000 grant from the Oswestry Visitor Facilities Infrastructure fund.

The first steam passenger services ran on the CHR on 24 August 2007, with a DMU trailer coach worked by ex-Hams Hall Peckett No. 1738/1928 on loan for two weekends from the Kingfisher Line. It was the first steam locomotive at Llynclys since the closure of the Oswestry-Welshpool section of the Cambrian in 1964.

== Extension developments ==
The Cambrian Heritage Railway is extending and repairing track from Llynclys South northwards towards Oswestry to enable trains to run into the former Cambrian Railway headquarters at Oswestry. The line between Llynclys Junction and the A483 level crossing at Weston on the Oswestry bypass was largely cleared and was visited by HM Railways Inspectorate in September 2009 with recommendations made.

Additional working-party activities have concentrated on the eastern edge of Dolgoch housing estate between Porth-y-waen and Llynclys and the A483 road bridge at Llynclys. Efforts are soon expected to be directed from the Dolgoch housing estate west towards Blodwel, which will link up with an already cleared section at Porth-y-waen.

Recent work has concentrated on reinstating track from then railhead south of Oswestry station, to Weston Wharf, where there is a craft brewery and other recreational facilities. Before this extension was realised, work was required prior to track being re-laid: the replacement of the Middleton Road Footbridge; lowering of the trackbed under Gasworks Bridge; and the replacement of the Cattle Creep girders beyond Travis Perkins.

By December 2018, ballast was laid from the current railhead to Gasworks Bridge and from the Cattle Creep north to near the bridleway crossing at Travis Perkins. Concrete sleepers were laid from the railhead to where the sewer passes under the track, at which point steel sleepers were laid. Concrete sleepers had also been laid for about 200m north from the Cattle Creep. Work progressed, using mechanical help, in spacing and aligning the sleepers.

Early in 2019, a contractor fixed the rail-bearing chairs to the concrete slab under Gasworks Bridge. Work on Gasworks Bridge was completed and trains can run under it. Track has been laid at Weston Wharf after the rolling stock that was stored there had been moved. Sections for the new station at Weston Wharf were delivered and installed. The extension to Weston was completed and opened for service on 2 April 2022.

== T&WA Order ==
The CHR applied for a Transport and Works Act Order for transfer of Network Rail's residual rights to itself and the Cambrian Railways Order 2017 (SI 2017/370) was granted on 28 February 2017. This permits the CHR to reopen the route from Gobowen to Blodwel Quarry, subject to level crossings of the A5 and A483 being replaced by a tunnel and overbridge respectively.

== Stations ==
=== Cambrian Railway (Oswestry) ===
- Gobowen (future interchange for commuter services to the National Rail network)
- Park Hall Halt
- Oswestry
- Weston Wharf
- Llynclys North (located at the exact site of Llynclys Junction, this will be the replacement station site to the former Llynclys station site as well as the future junction station towards Blodwel)
- Porth-Y-Waen Halt
- Blodwell

=== Cambrian Railway (Llynclys) ===
- Gobowen (future interchange for commuter services to the National Rail network)
- Park Hall Halt
- Oswestry
- Weston Wharf
- Llynclys South (current northern terminus)
- Penygarreg Lane Halt (current southern terminus)

=== Locations and map ===
Point	Coordinates (Links to map resources)	OS Grid Ref	Notes
Oswestry	52.8611°N 3.0499°W	SJ29412980	
Weston Wharf	52.8414°N 3.0429°W	SJ29852760	
(Planned) Llynclys North station	52.8119°N 3.0608°W	SJ28592434	Not Open Yet
(Former) Llynclys	52.8092°N 3.0629°W	SJ28452404	Closed
Llynclys South	52.8078°N 3.0638°W	SJ28382389	
Blodwell Junction	52.8006°N 3.1111°W	SJ25182313	Closed
Porthywaen Halt	52.8107°N 3.0826°W	SJ27122423	Closed
Penygarreg Lane Halt	52.7985°N 3.0697°W	SJ27972286	

== Locomotives ==
The locomotive fleet currently based on the line is listed below.

=== Oswestry–Weston Wharf section ===
==== Steam Locomotives ====
- Andrew Barclay Sons & Co. 0-6-0ST no. 885 of 1900. Not in service.
- Hudswell Clarke 0-6-0T "Gothenburg" no. 32 of 1903. On loan and in service.
- Peckett 0-4-0ST "Adam" no. 1430 of 1916. Stored awaiting restoration.
- Andrew Barclay Sons & Co. 0-4-0ST "Fife Flyer No 6" no. 2261 of 1949. Not in service.
- Beyer Peacock 0-4-0ST "Oliver Veltom" no. 2131 of 1951. Not in service.
- Hunslet Austerity 0-6-0ST "Norma" no. 3770 of 1952. Not in service.

==== Diesel Locomotives ====
- Hudswell 0-4-0DM no. D893 of 1951. On display in the Cambrian Railways Museum.
- FC Hibberd 4wDM "Cyril", works no. 3541 of 1952. Not in service.
- Ruston & Hornsby 0-4-0DM "Scottie", works no. 412427 of 1957. Previously carried the number 1. Not in service.
- Planet 0-4-0 Diesel hydraulic "Alpha", works no. 3953 of 1962. Operational as a yard shunter.
- Ruston and Hornsby 165DE 0-4-0 "Alun Evans" no. 11517, works no. 458641 of 1963. In passenger service.

==== Diesel Multiple Units ====
- BR Class 101 unit nos. 51205+51512 of 1957–1959. Not in service.
- BR Class 144 unit nos. 144006 (55806+55829) and 144007 (55807+55830) of 1987. In passenger service.

==== Electro-Diesel Locomotives ====
- BR Class 73 "City of Winchester" no. 73129 of 1965–1967. In passenger service.

=== Llynclys–Penygarreg Lane Halt section ===
==== Diesel Locomotives ====
- BR 0-6-0 Class 08 no. D3019 of 1953. Not in service.
- Vulcan 0-4-0 "Telemon" no. 295 of 1955. Operational for passenger and shunting duties.
- Hudswell Clarke 0-4-0 no. D1288 of 1967. Not in service.
- English Electric 0-6-0DH "Jana" no. D1201 of 1969. Not in service.
- English Electric 'Stephenson' Class 0-6-0DH no. D1230 of 1969. Known as 'Kimberley' by previous owners but no plates carried. Operational as a shunter and permanent way locomotive.

==== Diesel Multiple Units ====
- BR Class 101 unit nos. 51187+54055 of 1957-1959. Not in service.
- BR Class 142 unit no. 142055 (55705+55751) of 1986. 142055 is operational. Owned by the 142055 Group.

==== Electric Multiple Units ====
- BR Class 503 no. 28690 of 1938. Stored at Llynclys. Owned by the Heritage Electric Trains Trust.

==== Miscellaneous ====
- GP-TRAMM (General Purpose Track Repair and Maintenance Machine) no. 98205 of 1985. Stored at Blodwel.

== Carriages ==
Passenger carriages are based at Llynclys, Oswestry and Weston for use, storage or future restoration to be carried out. Most of the British Rail Mark 1 variety had already seen service in preservation prior to being brought on site, as most of these vehicles were originally based at the Great Central Railway in Loughborough. The carriage fleet currently based on the line is listed below.

=== Oswestry–Weston Wharf section ===
- GWR autocoach 163 of 1927. Stored at Weston, Oswestry. Owned by the GWR Autocoach Coach 163 Trust.
- BR Mk 1 TSO W3950 of 1955. In restored condition but not in use at Weston, Oswestry.
- BR Mk 1 TSO E4610 of 1956. Undergoing overhaul with the bodywork receiving attention.
- BR Mk 1 TSO E4965 of 1961. Operational at Oswestry.
- BR Mk 3 SLE 10722 of 1984. Ex-Caledonian Sleeper. Stored at Oswestry.
- BR Mk 1 CK 15632 of 1956. Undergoing overhaul, bodywork receiving minor repairs and roof being repainted.
- BR Mk 1 CK E16025 of 1957. Undergoing overhaul.
- BR Mk 1 BSK E35334 of 1962. Operational at Oswestry.
- BR Mk 1 BSK 35342 of 1962. Stored awaiting restoration.
- BR Mk 1 35444 of 1963. Stored at Oswestry.
- BR Mk 3 40751 LNER Buffet Coach of 1981. Used as a station shop and café at Weston.
- BR Mk 1 E43145 of 1955. Operational at Oswestry.
- BR Mk 1 81423 of 1958. Stored at Oswestry.

=== Llynclys–Penygarreg Lane Halt section ===
- BR Mk 1 RMB 1850 of 1959. Non-operational and used as a station shop and café at Llynclys.
- BR Mk 1 BSK 35316 of 1962. In restored condition but not used at Llynclys.
- BR Mk 1 E43046 of 1954. Stored at Llynclys.

== See also ==
- Railways of Shropshire
