= Llynclys railway station =

Former railway station in England

Llynclys
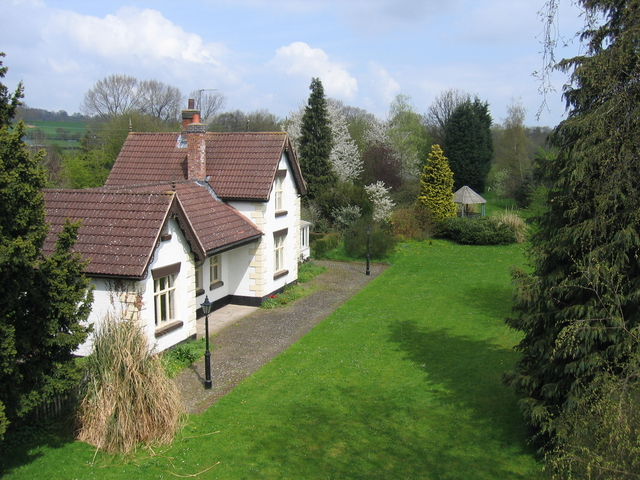
- Llynclys Station Building

General information
- Location: Llynclys, Shropshire; England
- Coordinates: 52.8092°N 3.0629°W
- Grid reference: SJ284240
- Platforms: 2

Other information
- Status: Disused

History
- Original company: Oswestry and Newtown Railway
- Pre-grouping: Cambrian Railways
- Post-grouping: Great Western Railway

Key dates
- 1 May 1860: Opened
- 18 January 1965: Closed
Location

Llynclys railway station was a station in Llynclys, Shropshire, England. The station was opened on 1 May 1860 and closed on 18 January 1965.

== Present day ==
The station remains as a private residence but both platforms have been filled in and the trackbed forms a garden. The Cambrian Heritage Railway have hopes to reconnect the line from Oswestry to Pant but have run into a problem with completing this due to the trackbed through the former station being part of a private residence and has led to the CHR waiting to buy the former station building, although part of the section south to Pant has been rebuilt as a heritage railway. This is what has led to the heritage railway being unable to reconnect with the line to Oswestry.

Preceding station	Disused railways	Following station
Pant (Salop); Line and station closed	Cambrian Railways; Oswestry and Newtown Railway	Oswestry; Line and station closed
