= Porthywaen Halt railway station =

Former railway station in Porth-y-waen, Shropshire, England

Porthywaen Halt
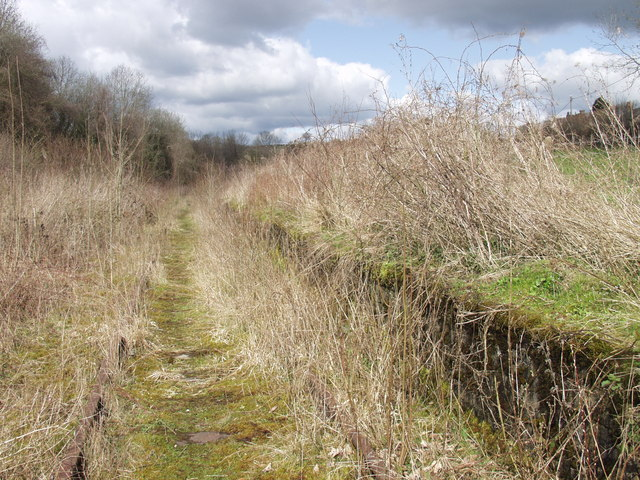
- The site of Porthywaen Halt, in 2006

General information
- Location: Porth-y-waen, Shropshire; England
- Coordinates: 52.8107°N 3.0826°W
- Grid reference: SJ270242
- Platforms: 1

Other information
- Status: Disused

History
- Original company: Tanat Valley Light Railway
- Pre-grouping: Cambrian Railways
- Post-grouping: Great Western Railway

Key dates
- 6 January 1904: Opened
- 15 January 1951: Closed
Location

Porthywaen Halt railway station was a station in Porth-y-waen, Shropshire, England, on the Tanat Valley Railway and the Potteries, Shrewsbury and North Wales Railway. The station opened in 1904 and closed in 1951. The short platform had a shelter and there was also signal box at the east end which controlled access to the quarry branches. Cambrian Heritage Railways has plans to re-open the station as part of its aim of reopening the line from Gobowen to Blodwel. The platform is still extant.

Preceding station	Disused railways	Following station
Blodwell Junction; Line and station closed	Cambrian Railways; Tanat Valley Light Railway	Oswestry; Line and station closed
