= Pant railway station (England) =

Former railway station in the Wales

Pant (Salop)

General information
- Location: Pant, Shropshire; England
- Coordinates: 52.7940°N 3.0736°W
- Grid reference: SJ277223
- Platforms: 2

Other information
- Status: Disused

History
- Original company: Oswestry and Newtown Railway
- Pre-grouping: Cambrian Railways
- Post-grouping: Great Western Railway

Key dates
- February 1862: Opened
- 18 January 1965: Closed
Location

Pant (Salop) railway station was a station in Pant, Shropshire, England. The station was opened in February 1862 and closed on 18 January 1965.

Preceding station	Disused railways	Following station
Llanymynech; Line and station closed	Cambrian Railways; Oswestry and Newtown Railway	Llynclys; Line and station closed
