= Blodwell Junction railway station =

Disused railway station in Llanyblodwell, Shropshire

Blodwell Junction
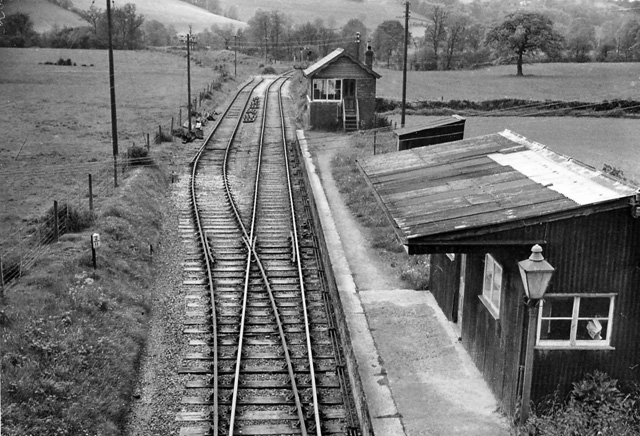
- Blodwell Junction station in 1962

General information
- Location: Llanyblodwel, Shropshire; England
- Coordinates: 52.8006°N 3.1111°W
- Grid reference: SJ250231
- Platforms: 1

Other information
- Status: Disused

History
- Original company: Potteries, Shrewsbury and North Wales Railway
- Pre-grouping: Cambrian Railways
- Post-grouping: Great Western Railway

Key dates
- 18 April 1870: Opened as Llanyblodwel
- 5 January 1904: Renamed Blodwell Junction
- 15 January 1951: Closed to passengers
- 6 January 1964: Closed to goods trains
Location

Blodwell Junction railway station was a station in Llanyblodwel, Shropshire, England. The station opened on 18 April 1870 as Llanyblodwel before being renamed in 1904. The station closed to passengers on 15 January 1951 and closed completely on 6 January 1964. There is no trace of the station today.

== Present day ==
The tracks remained in use to serve Nantmawr Quarry until 1984 when the entire line was closed by British Rail and the line was left in situ from Blodwell Junction to near Oswestry. The line has since been cleared and is now under the co-ownership of both the Cambrian Heritage Railway and the recently reformed Tanat Valley Light Railway.

Preceding station	Disused railways	Following station
Llanyblodwel Halt; Line and station closed	Cambrian Railways; Tanat Valley Light Railway	Porthywaen Halt; Line and station closed
Llanymynech; Line and station closed	Cambrian Railways; Nantmawr Branch	Nantmawr quarry Line closed
