= Oswestry railway station =

Former railway station in England

Coordinates: 52.8611°N 3.0499°W

Oswestry
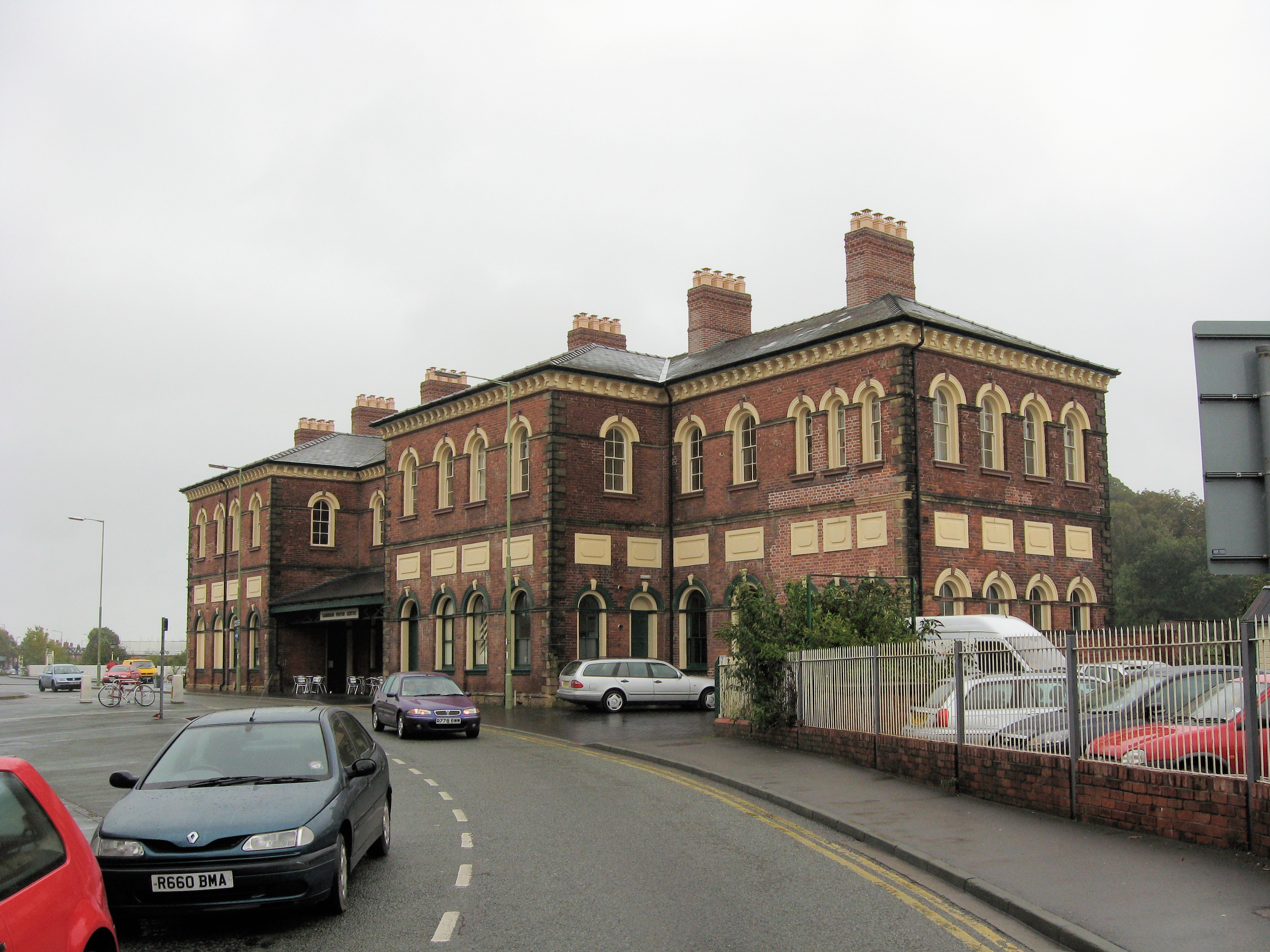

General information
- Location: Oswestry, Shropshire; England
- Grid reference: SJ294298
- System: Station on heritage railway
- Operator: Cambrian Heritage Railways
- Platforms: 1 (formerly 6)

History
- Original company: Oswestry & Newtown Railway
- Pre-grouping: Cambrian Railways
- Post-grouping: Great Western Railway; Western Region of British Railways

Key dates
- 1 May 1860: Station opened
- 7 November 1966: Closed to passengers
- 1971: Closed to freight
- 17 August 2014: First steam services restart
Location

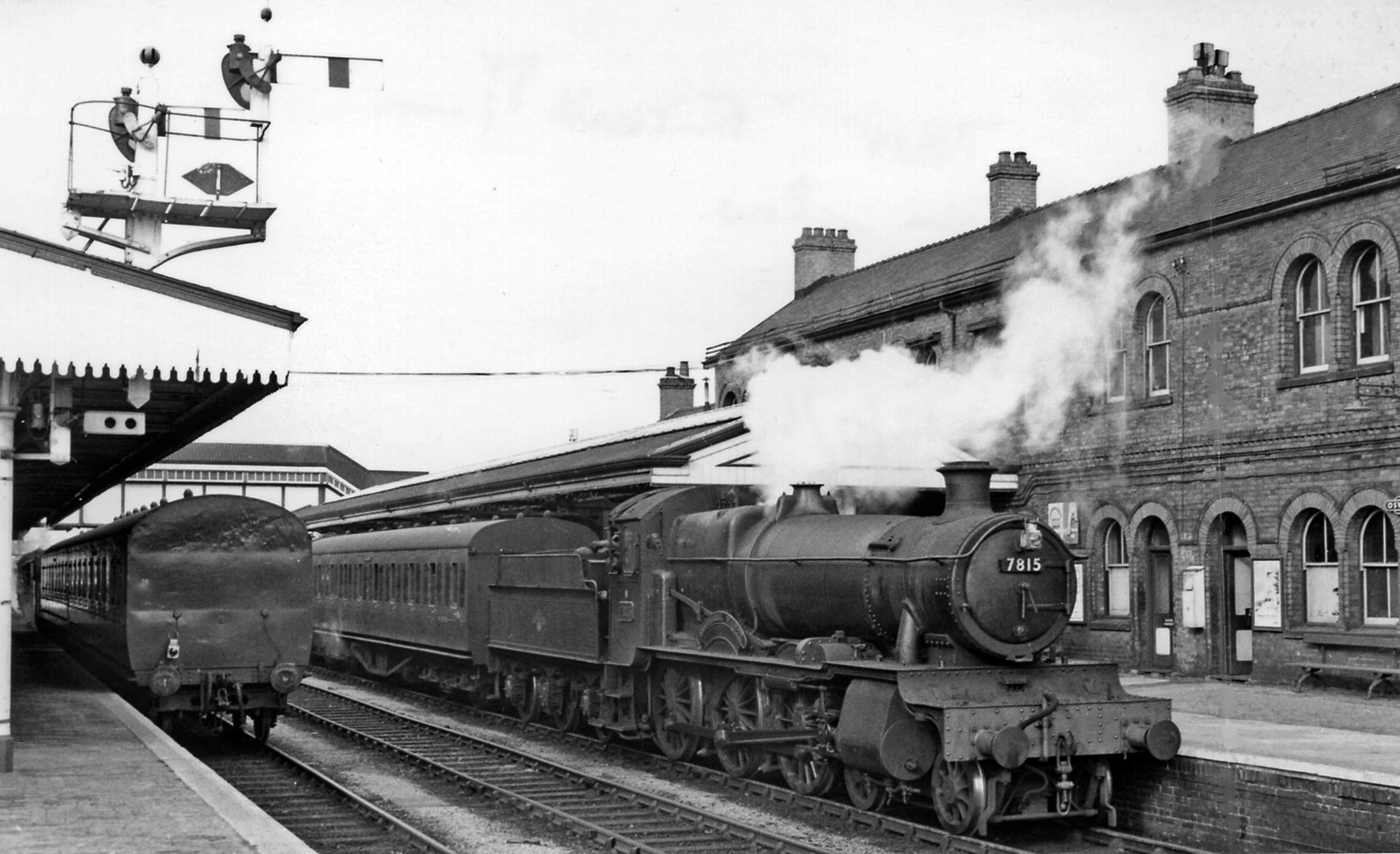
View north towards Whitchurch and Gobowen, with ex-GWR 7800 Class 4-6-0 No. 7815 Fritwell Manor on a down-stopping service towards Welshpool

Oswestry railway station is a Grade II listed heritage railway station in Oswestry, Shropshire, England. It was closed when passenger services were withdrawn in 1966. The station building today is used as commercial premises, although the Cambrian Railways Society are restoring it.

== History ==
=== Great Western Railway ===
The railway was first opened by the Great Western Railway (GWR) who opened its single platform station on 1 January 1849 on a branch from Gobowen.

Under the Railway Act 1921, the Cambrian Railways was allocated to the GWR. The GWR closed its competing station on 7 July 1924 and diverted all services to either pass through or terminate at the adjacent former Cambrian Railways station. The main GWR service integrated was the shuttle to Chester via Gobowen on the Shrewsbury-Chester line.

The GWR immediately made the Cambrian Railways/London and North Western Railway engine shed its divisional base for the new Oswestry locomotive division, allocating it code: OSW. In 1929, the GWR improved the facilities, adding electric lighting to the entire complex, extra inspection pits, and a GWR standard-pattern single-ramp coaling stage. A further improvement programme occurred in 1939, when the wooden roof was replaced with steel trusses, allowing the introduction of improved clearances, increased ventilation and additional glass shuttering.

An administrative oddity occurred throughout the period of control by the GWR, in that a singular ex-LNWR engine was stabled but not allocated to Oswestry shed from 1923, only attached to the shed after 1946 when the UK railway system was nationalised under British Railways.

=== Cambrian Railways ===
Proposed to be formed from the amalgamation of a series of local regional railway companies, as a result the new company called Cambrian Railways (CR) proposed to base its headquarters in Oswestry. Using existing approval in an act of Parliament for development of a station, it proposed to build closer to the centre of the town than the existing Great Western Railway (GWR) station, which had opened in 1849. On completion, the CR station would complete the mainline for the London and North Western Railway, from Whitchurch on the Crewe and Shrewsbury Railway, to Welshpool in Mid-Wales.

The first connection to the station was made from the south by the Oswestry and Newtown Railway, which operated its first train on 1 May 1860. After a legal tussle between the two competing companies, LNWR and GWR, Parliament authorised building the CR/LNWR sponsored line to Whitchurch in August 1861, driven by the need to regenerate Ellesmere. However, the proposed route was heavily fought over by land owners, with the eventual tracks running via Fenn's Moss, requiring additional civil engineering, support and drainage to overcome the local bog conditions. On 25 July 1864 the CR was formally created, allowing the first CR train to the run from Whitchurch into Oswestry two days later on 27 July 1864.

=== Facilities ===
The station consisted of two main platforms, which each had two bays either end, creating a total of six platforms: one main up, one main down, two bays up, two bays down. Built to standard gauge, there was an allowance to build a third freight-bypass track down the middle of the running road, which was completed later by the GWR in 1923. The station building was designed by a local architect in keeping with CR constituent design philosophies, but was substantial and included a great deal of office accommodation and a Boardroom. This was to allow, once the first CR train had run into the station from the north, the CR to formally move its headquarters and administration base to the station building.

After the station opened, the CR demolished the temporary wooden 2-road O&NR shed, located just north in the fork between the GWR junction to Gobowen and the CR mainline to Whitchurch. Designed, engineered and hence based on standard LNWR practice, when completed it comprised: 4-road running shed; 2-road lifting shed; 55 feet (17 m) turntable; coal tip; plus associated offices and mess rooms.

On the opposite side of the tracks, the CR later built its own railway works. Its construction of 22 locomotive roads and an 11 carriage and wagon works sidings, hastened Oswestry's boom as a railway town: from a population of 5,500 in 1861; to nearly 10,000 40 years later.

A war memorial, designed by Allan G. Wyon, to 53 CR employees who died serving in World War I was erected after the war and stood in the station until after its final closure (1971) when, in 1975, Oswestry Town Council moved it into the Cae Glas Park where it stands today.

== Closure ==
In 1963, the station was reallocated to become part of the London Midland Region. In the review under the Beeching cuts, the Cambrian Railways line from Whitchurch to Welshpool was decreed surplus to demands and listed for closure.

On 18 January 1965, passenger services to Welshpool and Whitchurch ceased, and the locomotive shed was closed. A shuttle service to Gobowen, operated by diesel multiple units, continued until 7 November 1966, when both the station closed to passengers and the works were shut down.

Freight services continued to run until 1971, but following this much of the station was demolished, to leave only the main building. A single line from Gobowen through the station to Llanyblodwel quarry was used by freight trains until 1988 but since closure the track has remained in place .

== Present ==
=== Private ownership ===
The station was sold in the 1980s to local businessman Den Hinton and became Oswestry DIY & Home Centre. The offices and former Cambrian Railways boardroom on the first floor were converted into eight flats and two bedsits. The ground floor was opened up to form a large retail area and the rear platform was enclosed to provide storage.

The building was sold to Owens Motor Factors in 1993 who renamed their car parts business Cambrian Autoparts. During their redevelopment of the car park adjoining the building (which covered the land that previously carried the Oswestry to Gobowen line) a large air raid shelter was uncovered which had tunnels running off it to the old railway works.

In the late 1990s the site was purchased by Tesco with the aim of developing a supermarket on the land behind the station and using the original station building as the frontage and entrance foyer which would incorporate small, specialist retail units. After a fierce (and controversial) planning battle, permission was refused and the site remained empty until its purchase by the local authority in 2005. After restoration, this building was reopened as the Cambrian Visitor Centre in June 2006 but closed on 11 January 2008. It later reopened, and has since evolved into the headquarters of the Cambrian Heritage Railways (CHR) and a small catering establishment known as "Buffers"; other parts of the building have been converted into retail and office units to contribute to the upkeep of the building.

=== Cambrian Heritage Railways ===
The single railway track still runs through the station, and is the subject of a plan by Cambrian Heritage Railways to reopen the line between Oswestry and Llanyblodwel, and eventually to Gobowen to reconnect with the mainline. CHR has agreed leases with Shropshire Council for an 8.5-mile (13.7 km) section of the Oswestry and Newtown Railway between Gobowen and Blodwel. The lease runs for 50 years from 2014.

On 17 August 2014, Beyer Peacock 0-4-0ST No. 1827 hauled the first steam passenger services from Oswestry for the first time since January 1965. Passengers were carried in the CHR's brake van over the first half-mile of track towards Gobowen.

=== Transport & Works Act Order ===
The CHR applied for a Transport & Works Act Order for transfer of Network Rail's residual rights to itself and this was granted on 28 February 2017. This permits the CHR to reopen the route from Gobowen to Blodwel Quarry subject to level crossings of the A5 and A483 being replaced by a tunnel and overbridge respectively.

=== Cambrian Railways Museum ===
The station's former goods depot now serves as the Cambrian Railways Museum. Displays include photographs, signs, lamps, signal box fittings, and artefacts related to the history of the Cambrian Heritage Railways.

== Services ==
Preceding station	Heritage railways	Following station
Weston Wharf Terminus	Cambrian Heritage Railways Weston Wharf–Oswestry section	Terminus
Disused railways
Park Hall Halt; Line and station closed	Great Western Railway; Oswestry to Gobowen Branch	Terminus
Porthywaen Halt; Line and station closed	Cambrian Railways; Tanat Valley Light Railway	Terminus
Llynclys; Line and station closed	Cambrian Railways; Oswestry and Newtown Railway; Oswestry, Ellesmere and Whitchurch Railway	Tinkers Green Halt; Line and station closed

== See also ==
- Listed buildings in Oswestry
