= Weston Wharf railway station =

Railway station in Shropshire, England

Weston Wharf
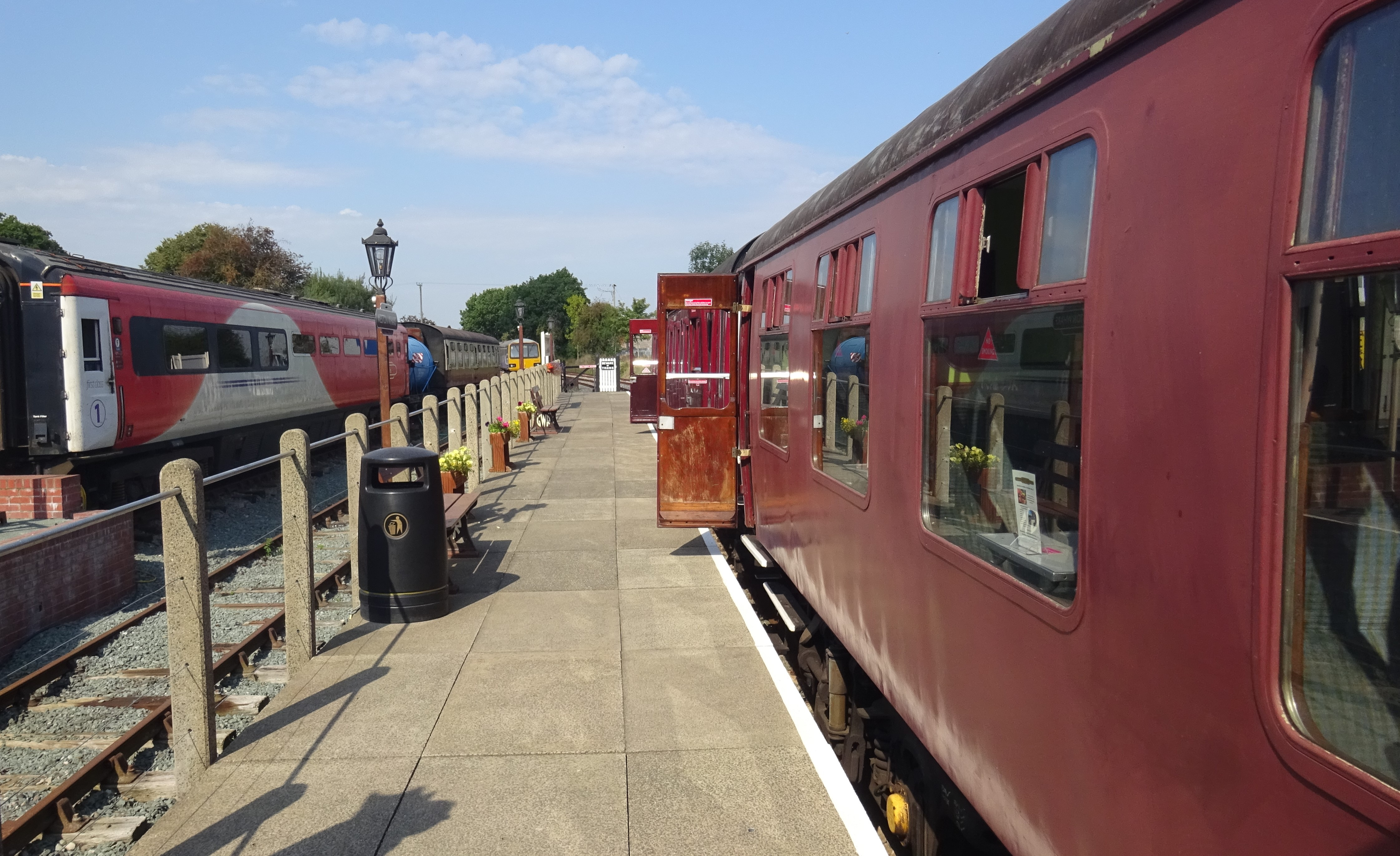

General information
- Location: Morda, Shropshire; England
- Coordinates: 52.8414°N 3.0429°W
- System: Station on heritage railway
- Manager: Cambrian Heritage Railway
- Platforms: 1

Key dates
- 2 April 2022: Official opening
Location

Weston Wharf is a railway station on the Cambrian Heritage Railways' line in Shropshire on the former Oswestry and Newtown Railway. It is located off the A483 road, by Weston Road near the Shropshire village of Morda and the Weston Pools holiday village and fishery. Oswestry town centre lies 1 3/4 miles (2.8 km) to the north.The station is next to the Stonehouse Brewery.

== History ==
Plans to extend the line from Oswestry were reported in January 2016. The work was scheduled to proceed in three stages: phase one from Oswestry to Gasworks Bridge which carries the B4579 Shrewsbury Road over the line, phase two to make Gasworks Bridge passable and phase three to reach Weston Wharf. At Gasworks Bridge, the track had to be lowered to allow trains to pass under the steel girder frame installed to strengthen the bridge. Funding was received from Shropshire Council and Oswestry Town Council.

By April 2022 the 2 miles (3.2 km) of track from Oswestry to Weston Wharf, which lay abandoned for more than 50 years, had been reinstated. The station was officially opened on 2 April 2022 by Helen Morgan MP and Vince Hunt, Chairman of Shropshire Council. It consists of a single platform, a run-around loop and a siding. Previously, there was no station here, only a goods depot.

Preceding station	Heritage railways	Following station
Terminus	Cambrian Heritage Railways Weston Wharf–Oswestry section	Oswestry Terminus
