= Llynclys =

Village in Shropshire, England

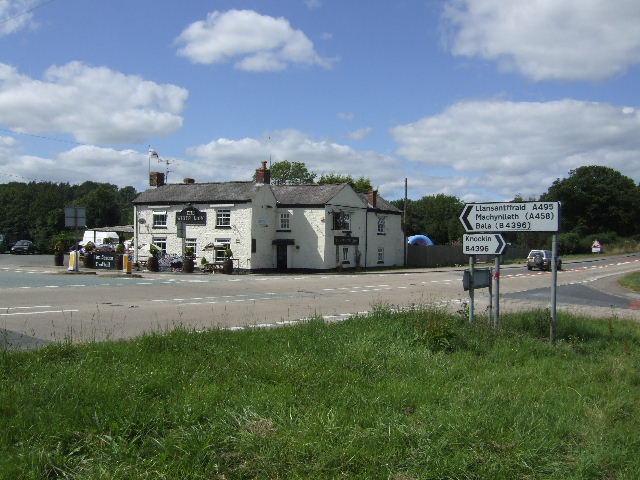
- The White Lion at Llynclys

- Location within Shropshire
- OS grid reference: SJ284239
  - London: 155 mi (249 km) SE
- Civil parish: Llanyblodwel
- Unitary authority: Shropshire
- Ceremonial county: Shropshire
- Region: West Midlands
- Country: England
- Sovereign state: United Kingdom
- Post town: OSWESTRY
- Postcode district: SY10
- Dialling code: 01691
- Police: West Mercia
- Fire: Shropshire
- Ambulance: West Midlands
- UK Parliament: North Shropshire

Llynclys (English: /ˈlʌŋklɪs/, Welsh pronunciation: [ˈɬɨːnklɨːs])) is a small village in Shropshire, England, in the civil parish of Llanyblodwel. It lies north of Pant at the crossroads of the A483 and B4396, where there are several houses and a pub, the White Lion.

== Etymology ==
The name Llynclys is based on the Welsh word for lake, llyn, and Llynclys Pool still lies near to the village. The -clys element was in the past thought to be derived from llys, "palace" or "court", and the lake, supposed to be of extraordinary depth, was said to contain a drowned city or palace with various legends attached to it.

== Countryside ==
Much of the area around Llynclys Hill to the west is common land; there are a number of cottages and smallholdings probably built by workers in the area's lead mines and limestone quarries. Llynclys Common, from which there are fine views, is home to eight varieties of orchid and the brown argus butterfly.

== Railways ==
Llynclys was formerly on the Cambrian Railways line from Oswestry to Welshpool. The Cambrian Heritage Railways are now re-building sections of the line as a heritage railway. Llynclys South railway station is in operation, whilst the original Llynclys station remains unused of 2010.

== Plane Crash ==
On 30 October 1941 a Royal Air Force, Handley Page Hampden Mk I (P1294) crashed near the White Lion pub while on a training flight in bad weather, all four crew died
