= Gobowen railway station =

Railway station in Shropshire, England

Gobowen
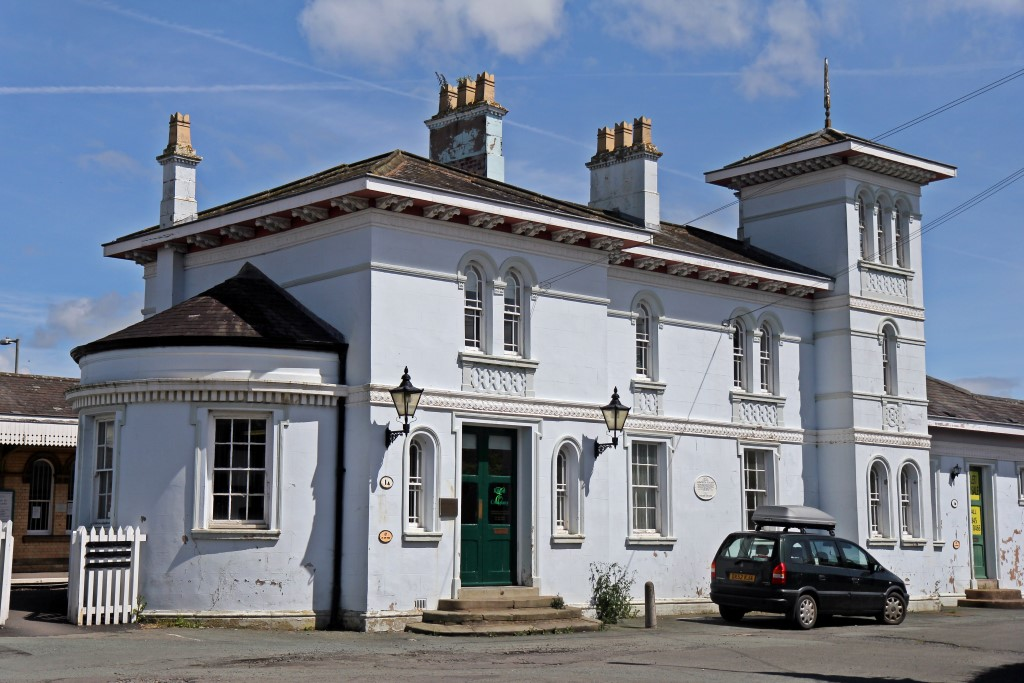

General information
- Location: Gobowen, Shropshire; England
- Coordinates: 52.8935°N 3.0371°W
- Grid reference: SJ303333
- Manager: Transport for Wales
- Line: Shrewsbury–Chester
- Platforms: 2

Other information
- Station code: GOB
- Classification: DfT category E

History
- Original company: Shrewsbury, Oswestry and Chester Junction Railway
- Pre-grouping: Great Western Railway

Key dates
- 12 October 1848: Opened

Passengers
- 2020/21: ▼37,790
- 2021/22: ▲0.154 million
- 2022/23: ▲0.195 million
- 2023/24: ▲0.218 million
- 2024/25: ▲0.248 million
Location
Notes
- Passenger statistics from the Office of Rail and Road

Gobowen railway station is a railway station on the Shrewsbury to Chester Line of the former Great Western Railway's London Paddington to Birkenhead Woodside via Birmingham Snow Hill line, serving the village of Gobowen in Shropshire, England. It is the nearest station to the town of Oswestry.

== History ==
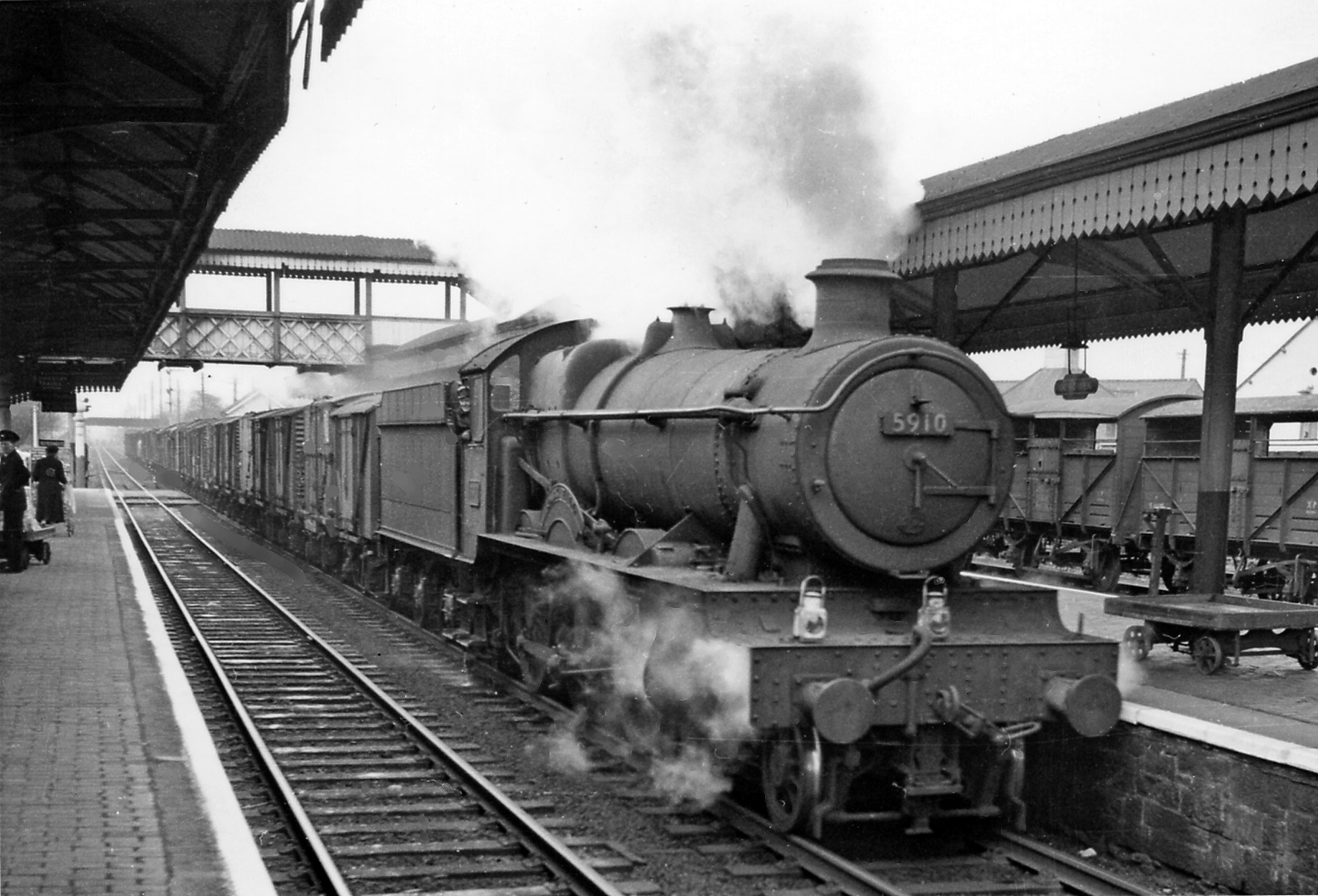
Up fast freight passing in 1960

The station building was designed by Thomas Mainwaring Penson, and is a Grade II listed building. The station was built between 1846 and 1848 by the Shrewsbury and Chester Railway in a notable Florentine (or Italianate) style with white stucco facing and a small turret. The awnings and the footbridge were added later by the Great Western Railway (the footbridge was demolished in 1987). Although a very small village, Gobowen was the junction station for the much larger regional town of Oswestry some three miles away. When rail services to Oswestry ceased in November 1966, Gobowen was retained as the railhead for the surrounding area. There is a scheme in progress to open this branch as a heritage railway. Until 1967 Gobowen was served by the GWR, latterly BR Western Region, express services between London Paddington and Birkenhead Woodside.

In the booking office is a replica nameplate for Wrexham & Shropshire locomotive 67015, which was named in honour of David Lloyd who was also a keen campaigner for the restoration of a direct rail link between the area and London.

== Facilities ==
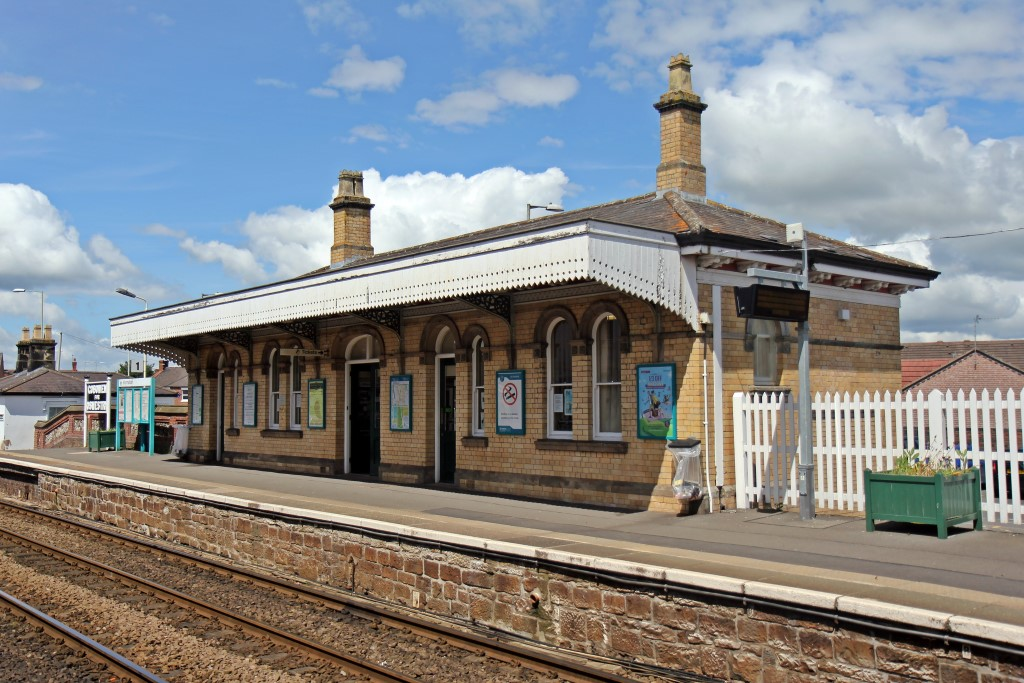
The ticket office building (2014)

The main building, which was renovated in 2005, is used as small business space. The booking office is now located in the waiting room on the southbound platform. Unusually, it is not operated directly by the train operating company but by an independent travel agent, Severn-Dee Travel.

A vending machine and disabled access toilet is located in the ticket hall, with a ticket vending machine provided on both platforms. Train running information is offered via CIS displays, timetable posters and automatic announcements. Level access to both platforms is via the staffed barrier level crossing at the north end which is controlled from the adjacent signal box.

There are no waiting shelters, but canopies are provided on both platforms:

- Platform 1 - For southbound services to Shrewsbury, Cardiff Central or Birmingham New Street
- Platform 2 - For northbound services to Wrexham General, Chester or Holyhead

== Services ==
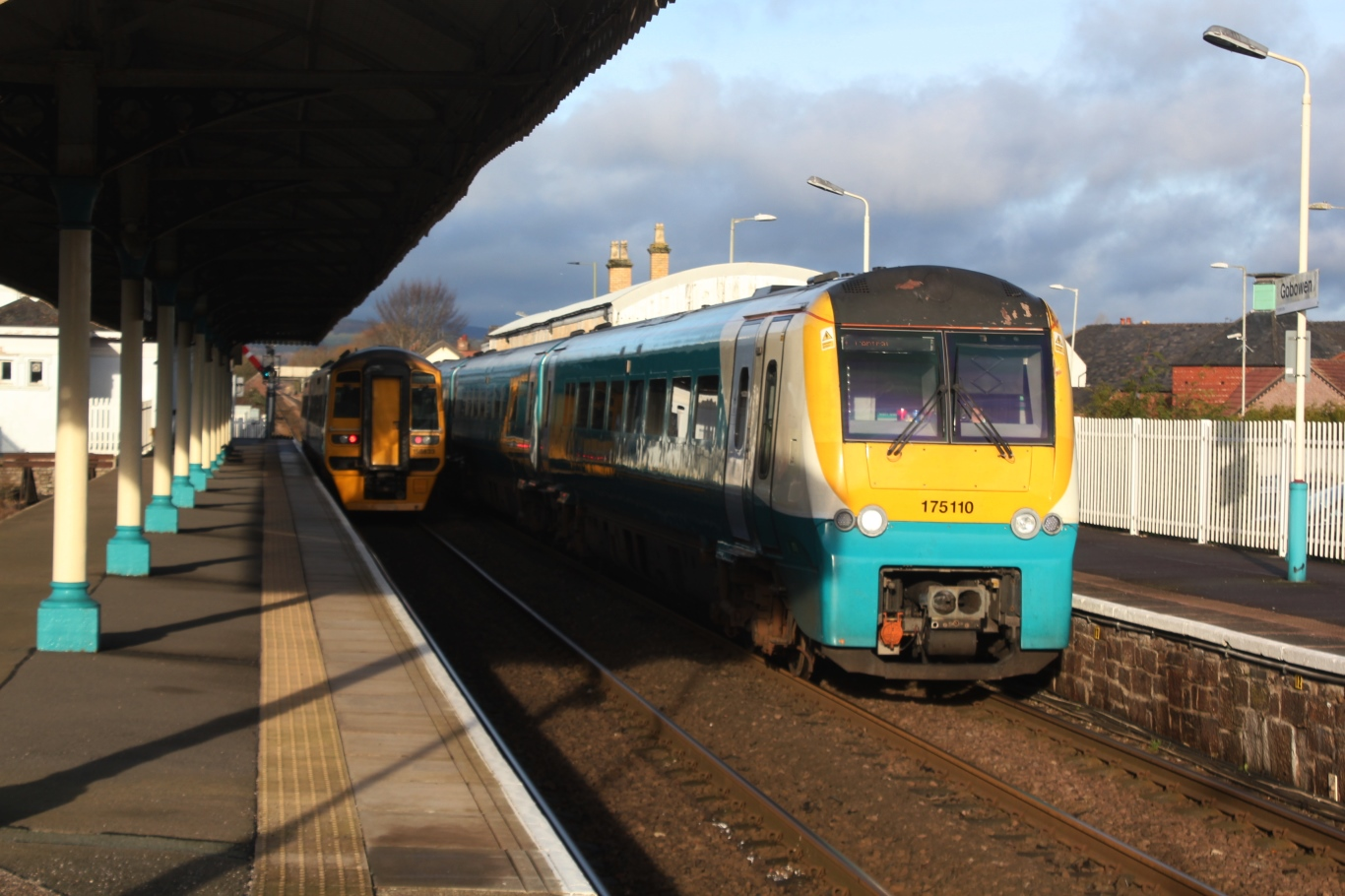
Transport for Wales Class 175 with a train for Cardiff passing a Class 158 from Birmingham

As of October 2018, train services run on two routes:

- Transport for Wales service from Birmingham International to Holyhead.
- Transport for Wales service from Holyhead to Cardiff.

These combine to give a basic hourly frequency between Shrewsbury and Chester (Mon - Sat). Two early morning northbound trains terminate short at Wrexham General on weekdays (one of which connects with the Avanti West Coast service to London Euston), whilst one morning and one evening train start from there. Others at the start and end of day run between Chester and Shrewsbury only, though there is also one late evening weekday through train to Manchester Piccadilly and three that run to Llandudno rather than Holyhead (with one in the opposite direction). On Sundays, there is a two-hourly service (with occasional extras) each way, mostly running between Chester and Birmingham International (though there are three trains to Holyhead and two to Cardiff).

Preceding station	National Rail	Following station
Shrewsbury	Transport for Wales; Shrewsbury to Chester Line	Chirk
	Historical railways	
Whittington Low Level	Great Western Railway; Shrewsbury to Chester Line	Weston Rhyn
Park Hall Halt; Line and station closed	Great Western Railway; Oswestry to Gobowen Branch	Terminus

== Future ==
Gobowen station may become the northern terminus of the proposed Cambrian Heritage Railways line to Llynclys, Pant and Blodwel via Oswestry. Shropshire Council was to acquire the coal yard at Gobowen for railway-related uses, including car parking for the station. If the plans are fully realised, the station would have three platforms, one of which would be for the Heritage Railway.

== Bibliography ==
- Hendry, R. Preston; Hendry, R. Powell (1992). Paddington to the Mersey. Oxford Publishing Company. pp. 112–113. ISBN 9780860934424. OCLC 877729237.
- Marshall, Geoff; Pipe, Vicki (2018). The Railway Adventures: Places, Trains, People and Stations. September Publishing. ISBN 978-1910463871.
- Mitchell, Vic; Smith, Keith (2010). Shrewsbury to Chester. Middleton Press. pp. 27–36. ISBN 9781906008703. OCLC 495274299.
