= John Lloyd (cricketer) =

Welsh cricketer

Personal information
- Full name: John Maurice Edward Lloyd
- Born: 7 May 1844; Llanmerewig, Montgomeryshire, Wales
- Died: 21 January 1910 (aged 65); Montgomery, Montgomeryshire, Wales
- Batting: Unknown

Domestic team information
- Years: Team
- 1866: Oxford University

Career statistics
Competition	First-class
Matches	1
Runs scored	6
Batting average	6.00
100s/50s	–/–
Top score	6
Catches/stumpings	1/–
- Source: Cricinfo, 29 March 2020

John Maurice Edward Lloyd (7 May 1844 – 21 January 1910) was a Welsh first-class cricketer and barrister.

Lloyd was born in January 1844 at Llanmerewig, Montgomeryshire, the second of three sons of the Reverend John Lloyd (1810–1891), of Castell Forwyn, Abermule, Montgomeryshire, rector of Llanmerewig from 1844 to 1878, and his wife Marianne (d. 1850), daughter of Edward Davies, of Rhydwhiman. The Lloyd family had lived in the town of Montgomery for centuries, and were hereditary burgesses of the town, descending from Maurice Lloyd, Capital Bailiff of Montgomery in 1686. His elder brother, William Llewellyn Lloyd, succeeded their father as head of the family.

Lloyd was educated at Marlborough College, matriculating at Trinity College, Oxford in 1864, where he graduated B.A. in 1869, M.A. in 1872. While studying at Oxford, he made a single appearance in first-class cricket for Oxford University against the Gentlemen of England at Oxford in 1866. Opening the batting in the Oxford first-innings, he was dismissed for 6 runs by Isaac Walker. A student of Lincoln's Inn, he was called to the bar in April 1872, where he specialised as an equity draftsman and conveyancer.

In 1898, Lloyd married Alice Norton, daughter of Major-General Charles Stirling Dundas, son of the 26th Chief of Clan Dundas. Her mother, Mary Louisa, was daughter of Sir Norton Joseph Knatchbull, 10th Baronet. Their elder son was John Davies Knatchbull Lloyd, an antiquarian researcher and public servant. Lloyd died at his home, Plas Trefaldwyn, Montgomery- owned by the Lloyd family since the 1700s- in January 1910.

Lloyd did NOT die at his home of Plas Trefaldwyn. After one of the local elections (possibly mayoral?) he walked up to one of his friends, Tom Mitchell at the Old Castle Farm and borrowed a 12-bore shotgun from him, continued walking up the hill road to Llandyssil and shot himself dead. (You may have to look in local newspaper archives or do further research into this - I was told this story by an elderly friend born in the early 1930s who has lived in Montgomery all of his life).
