= Abermule with Llandyssil =

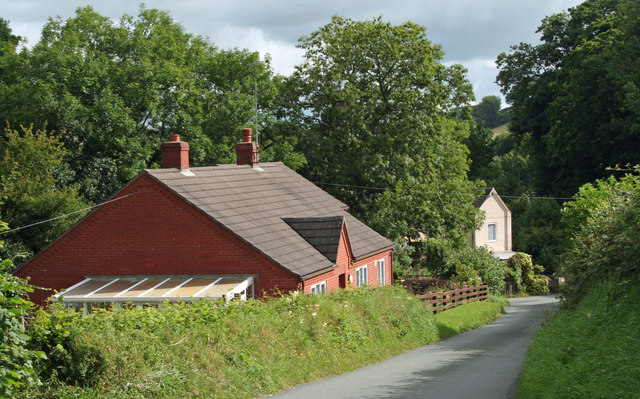
- Road To Llandyssil
- Principal area: Powys
- Country: Wales
- Sovereign state: United Kingdom
- Post town: MONTGOMERY
- Postcode district: SY15
- Post town: NEWTOWN
- Postcode district: SY16
- Dialling code: 01686
- Police: Dyfed-Powys
- Fire: Mid and West Wales
- Ambulance: Welsh
- UK Parliament: Montgomeryshire and Glyndŵr
- Senedd Cymru – Welsh Parliament: Montgomeryshire
- Website: Abermule with Llandyssil Community Council
- List of places UK Wales Powys 52°32′41.82″N 3°12′50.34″W Map of the community

Abermule with Llandyssil, formerly just Llandyssil (Welsh: Llandysul), is a community in Powys (historically Montgomeryshire), Wales, including the villages of Abermule and Llandyssil, and had a population of 1527 as of the 2011 UK Census. It also includes settlements of Llanmerewig and Green Lane.

The community, located near the border with England, is mainly English-speaking.

== History ==
In the 1986 Review, Llandyssil was formed from the former Llandyssil community, with the inclusion of parts of the former Bettws and Newtown communities, Abermule, Llanmerewig, and Llandyssil.

The railway now known as the Cambrian Line runs through the Community, following the river Severn. The former Abermule railway station is now closed.

== Governance ==
At the local level the community elects community councilors to Abermule with Llandyssil Community Council.

As at 2005, the community was divided for electoral purposes into two wards: Abermule in the west and Llandyssil in the east; each ward elected five community councillors. By 2017, there were seven council seats for Abermule, which had expanded in population, and four for Llandyssil, although in both wards fewer councillors than that were nominated.
