= Llanmerewig =

Coordinates: 52.526°N 3.241°W

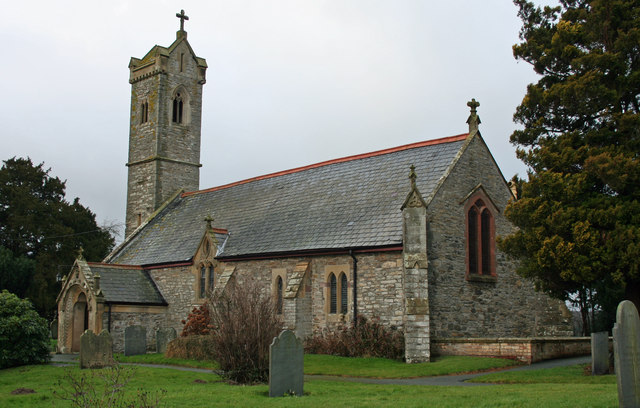
- Llanmerewig Church

- Location within Powys
- OS grid reference: SO157932
- Principal area: Powys
- Country: Wales
- Sovereign state: United Kingdom
- Post town: MONTGOMERY
- Postcode district: SY15
- Dialling code: 01686
- Police: Dyfed-Powys
- Fire: Mid and West Wales
- Ambulance: Welsh
- UK Parliament: Montgomeryshire and Glyndŵr
- Senedd Cymru – Welsh Parliament: Montgomeryshire

Llanmerewig is a historic parish in Powys, Wales, in the historic county of Montgomeryshire, and is situated between Newtown and Welshpool. The church and small village stand on high ground, which overlooks the river Severn, and is close to Abermule; part of which lies within the parish. The river Severn forms the North Western boundary of the parish and the Eastern boundary is the river Mule, which cuts through a steep gorge, before entering the Severn at Abermule. The historic parish covered 1,023 acres.

Until 1987 Llanmerewig was a community.

== Saint Llwchaiarn ==
The Church is dedicated to the 6th-century Saint Llwchaiarn, or Lluwchaiarn, who was also the patron saint of Llanllwchaearn near Newtown, and of two parishes in Ceredigion. The placename presents a problem as it would be expected that the llan ("parish") would proceed the recognizable name of its patron saint, but this is not the case. The most likely explanation is that the placename has been corrupted from Lam-yr-ewig or "Hind’s Leap". The 16th-century Welsh poet, Sion Keri uses the name "Lamerewig" as the placename and describes the various feats and miracles attributed to the saint which include slaying a dragon and causing a hind to leap into a pool of water.

== The church ==
Located on a lane 400m N of Llanmerewig village to the east of Church Farm. The church is situated in an oval churchyard (typical of a "llan’’ enclosure) bounded by a masonry wall. The medieval church has largely disappeared as church underwent major alterations on two occasions in the C19. The first alterations were undertaken from 1839 to 1843 by the rector, John Parker (1798-1860), an enthusiastic advocate of the Gothic style. The present curiously slender tower and a semi-dormer window on the S side were added at this time, and the porch was richly ornamented. The second series of restorations took place in 1892 and were more conventional in style; plans were prepared by Sir Aston Webb and the work was funded by Charles Whitley Owen of Fronfraith Hall. The E and N walls were rebuilt, and a new E window was built to match the old Medieval window which was removed to the E boundary wall of the churchyard, where it remains.. A fragment of the 15th century Rood Screen survives in the reconstructed screen of 1892.

Rectors

- 1537 David ap Llenn
- 1560 Thomas ap David
- 1564 Thomas Jenkin
- 1567 Griffith Jones
- 1573 Robert Myddelton
- 1575 Gregory Jones
- 1617 John Price
- 1618 John Lloyd
- 1620 Matthew Evans
- 1635 Edward Jones A.M.
- 1643 Thomas Bright A.M.
- 1666 Thomas Evance
- 1688 John Evance
- 1700 Ellis Jones
- 1700 Robert Smith
- 1732 Richard Lewis
- 1762 Roderick Jones
- 1782 Edward Vardy
- 1797 Roderick Jones
- 1798 Llewelyn Davies
- 1827 John Parker A.M.
- 1844 John Lloyd A.M.

== Administrative history ==
In the Medieval period Llanmerewig was in the Commote of Cedewain in the Kingdom of Powys. Llanmerewig appears to have consisted of only one or two townships, Llanmerewig itself and Cilgwrgan; which in the Medieval period may have been a township. In 1885, the township of Bolbro, which was previously in Llandyssil parish, was transferred to Llanmerewig. For ecclesiastical administration the parish is in the Diocese of St Asaph, the Archdeaconry of Montgomery and the Deanery of Cedewain. In 1974, as a result of Local Government reform, Llanmerewig was joined with Llandyssil Parish Council to become a Community Council within the new Montgomeryshire District Council. In 1984 the Community Council was renamed Abermule with Llandyssil Community Council. At this time, the Community Council covered the old parishes of Llanmerewig and Llandyssil, together with Dolforwyn, which had been a township in Bettws Cedewain parish. In 1996, with the abolition of the Montgomeryshire District Council, the Community Council became part of the Powys County Council unitary authority.

== Notable people ==
- John Lloyd (1844–1910), cricketer and barrister
