= Deanery of Cedewain =

Church in Wales (Anglican) Mission Area within the Archdeaconery of Montgomery

The Deanery of Cedewain is a deanery within the Archdeaconery of Montgomery in the Diocese of St Asaph. It is a large largely upland area between Welshpool and Newtown, which is cut across by the river Severn. It is first mentioned in the Lincoln Taxation of 1291. At that time it consisted of the parishes of Berriew, Bettws Cedewain, Manafon, Llanwyddelan, Tregynon, Newtown, Llanllwchaiarn, Llanmerewig, Llandyssil, and Aberhafesp. The Deanery was reconstituted by an Order in Council in 1849 and further changes in its boundaries occurred in 1882. In 1908 it consisted of eleven parishes: Aberhafesp, Bettws Cedewain, Dolfor, Kerry, Llandyssil, Llanllwchaiarn, Llanmerewig, Mochdre, Newtown, Sarn and Tregynon. For administrative purposes Llandyssil is now included in the Deanery of Pool.

Deaneries became known as Mission Areas from 2017. The Mission Area of Cedewain includes:

- All Saints, Mochdre (the most southern church in the group and one of the most western)
- All Saints, Newtown
- St Beuno, Bettws Cedewain
- St Cynon, Tregynon
- St Gwyddelan, Llanwyddelan (the most northern church in the group)
- St Gwynog, Aberhafesp (one of the most western churches in the group)
- St Llwchaiarn, Llanllwchaiarn
- St Llwchaiarn, Llanmerewig (the most eastern church in the group)
- St Michael, Kerry
