= Llandyssil =

Village in Powys, Wales

Coordinates: 52.550°N 3.186°W

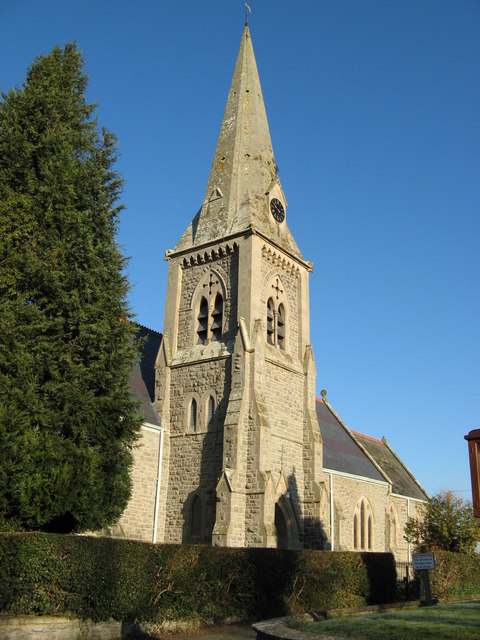

- Location within Powys
- Population: 300
- OS grid reference: SO1995
- Community: Abermule with Llandyssil
- Principal area: Powys
- Country: Wales
- Sovereign state: United Kingdom
- Post town: MONTGOMERY
- Postcode district: SY15
- Dialling code: 01686
- Police: Dyfed-Powys
- Fire: Mid and West Wales
- Ambulance: Welsh
- UK Parliament: Montgomeryshire and Glyndŵr
- Senedd Cymru – Welsh Parliament: Montgomeryshire

Llandyssil (Welsh: Llandysul) is a village in the community of Abermule with Llandyssil, in Powys, Wales, in the traditional county of Montgomeryshire. It is about two miles from the town of Montgomery.

In 2001 there were 420 inhabitants in the parish, of whom 300 lived in the village itself. (Note: The population figures are approximate because the 2001 Census figures do not coincide with the historic boundaries of the parish)

== Connection with Celtic saints ==
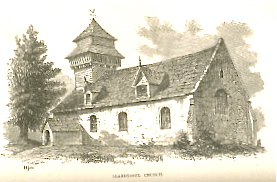
Old St Tysul's Church, Llandyssil c.1855 (from a drawing by Harry Longville Jones)

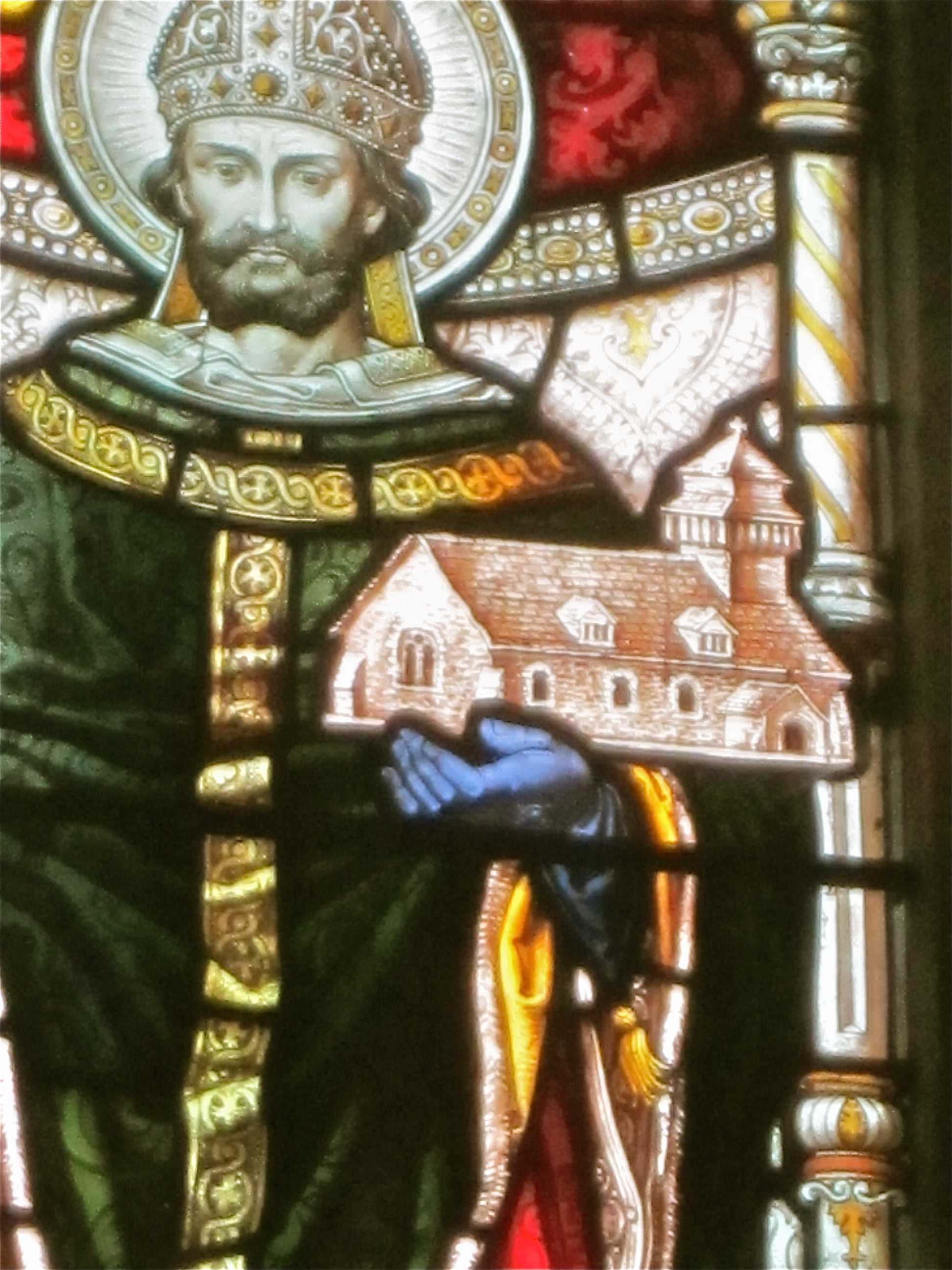
St Tyssul holding Llandyssil Church (window in Montgomery church)

Llandyssil takes its name from St Tysul, a little known Welsh saint of the 7th century. Only two churches in Wales were dedicated to this saint, Llandyssil in Montgomeryshire and Llandysul in Ceredigion, and the feast day for this saint was celebrated on 31 January. The old church in the village (largely demolished in 1866) stood in the graveyard to the southeast of the present village. This suggests that the present settlement dates back to the period around 700. There is also a connection with another early Welsh and Breton saint, St Padarn. On the highland to the south in Cefn y Coed is the farm Cwm Badarn. The Llandyssil Brook rises in this Cwm or valley, and between Cwm Badarn Farm and the Pinion is a rock-cut spring, that was possibly a holy well, dedicated to St Padarn.

== History ==
In the medieval period, Llandyssil was in the Cantref of Cedewain in the Kingdom of Powys. The parish was divided into four townships: Bolbro, Bronywood (or Bronycoed), Bryntalch and Rhandir. Rhandir, which contained the parish church, was the largest of these townships. It was probably an amalgamation of three other townships; Cefn-y-coed, Coedywig and Trefganol.

In 1536, following the Act of Union, Llandyssil became part of the new county of Montgomeryshire. For ecclesiastical administration, the parish was in the Bishopric of St Asaph, the Archdeaconry of Montgomery and the Deanery of Cedewain. For Parliamentary representation, Llandyssil fell within the County of Montgomery until 1885, when, for electoral purposes, it was included within the Montgomery Boroughs. It was transferred back to the county in 1918, when only one MP represented Montgomeryshire. In 2024 it became part of the new Montgomeryshire and Glyndŵr constituency.

With the establishment of the Montgomeryshire County Council in 1894, Llandyssil Parish Council was created, and it was included in Forden Rural District Council. In 1974, as a result of local government reform, Llandyssil Parish Council became a Community Council within the Montgomeryshire District Council. At this time, Llanmerewig was joined with Llandyssil to form the new community council, and in 1984 this was renamed Abermule with Llandyssil Community Council. At this time, the council covered the old parishes of Llanmerewig and Llandyssil, together with Dolforwyn, which had been a township in Bettws Cedewain parish. In 1996, with the abolition of the Montgomeryshire District Council, the Community Council became part of Powys County Council.

== Population and language ==
According to census returns, the historical population of Llandyssil has been as follows:

Historical population

Year	Pop.	±%
1801	645	—
1811	758	+17.5%
1821	870	+14.8%
1831	914	+5.1%
1841	876	−4.2%
1851	808	−7.8%

Year	Pop.	±%
1861	790	−2.2%
1871	830	+5.1%
1881	890	+7.2%
1891	704	−20.9%
1901	606	−13.9%
1911	626	+3.3%

Year	Pop.	±%
1921	661	+5.6%
1931	572	−13.5%
1951	509	−11.0%
1961	520	+2.2%

In 1880, a portion of the township of Bolbro was transferred from Llandyssil to Llanmerewig and the size of the parish was reduced from 4187 acres to 3800 acres. This may be reflected in the decrease in population between the 1881 and 1891 censuses.

During the later part of the 18th century, it appears that the Welsh language was supplanted by English for general usage in the village. There remain some Welsh speakers in the village, but they have mainly come from elsewhere in Montgomeryshire.

== Archaeological and historic monuments ==
Llandyssil is particularly rich in archaeological sites, especially of the Later Bronze Age and Iron Age. To the northeast is Ffridd Faldwyn, possibly the largest hillfort in Wales, which is adjacent to Town Hill in Montgomery. Most of the sites have been discovered by aerial photography. The main sites are as follows.

=== Prehistoric ===
The prehistoric sites include:

- Brynderwen Enclosure. Ditched enclosure close to the river Severn, dated to c.3350-3000 BC. Late Neolithic Peterborough ware pottery has been found at the site .
- Cefn Llan Hillfort in Cefnycoed. This enclosure, situated on low hill, is a scheduled ancient monument. The site is overgrown and its bank is starting to erode. To the north of the hillfort is a triple-ditched enclosure.
- Cloddiau. This is a triple-ditched enclosure, possibly a late Bronze Age or Iron Age cattle krall or banjo enclosure.
- Coed y Wig hillfort. An Iron Age hillfort revealed by aerial photography.
- Cuckoo Hill Hillfort. Another triple-ditched enclosure, this was excavated in 1993. A single rim sherd, probably dating from Roman times, was discovered there.
- Fron Fraith Wood Hillfort. This is the northwest part of two ditched enclosures. Excavated in 1994.
- Goron Ddu Hillfort. This hillfort overlooks the river Severn to the north of the village. Geophysical survey has shown a concentration of features in the centre of the enclosure, but with insufficient clarity to distinguish roundhouses.
- Mount Pleasant Defended Enclosure. A scheduled ancient monument, this is a double-ditched enclosure with surviving earthworks. Inside the enclosure, the remains of a clay dump rampart were discovered, with the remains of a hearth and grains of spelt. Radiocarbon dating suggests that the site was occupied in the earlier Iron Age.

=== Roman ===
- The Roman road from Forden Gaer/Lavrobrinta to Caersws runs through the parish along the river, probably largely in line with the B3484 from Caerhowel railway bridge to the Abermule railway bridge. A length of the road was uncovered in 2006, during the construction of the Felin Hafren housing estate in Abermule.

=== Early Medieval and Norman ===
- Brynderwen motte-and-bailey castle is an early castle that guarded the river Severn crossing. The motte has gone and the bailey area is occupied by a farm.
- Cefn Bryntalch motte-and-bailey castle stands to the southwest of Cefn Bryntalch house.
- Mound by Llandyssil Bridge. This may have been a barrow or medieval mill mound. Place names in the vicinity, such as Cae Melyn and Ty Melyn (originally Cae Melin and Ty Melin – Welsh for Mill Field and Mill House) may support its identification as a windmill mound for a post mill.

== Notable buildings and bridges ==
=== Churches and chapels ===
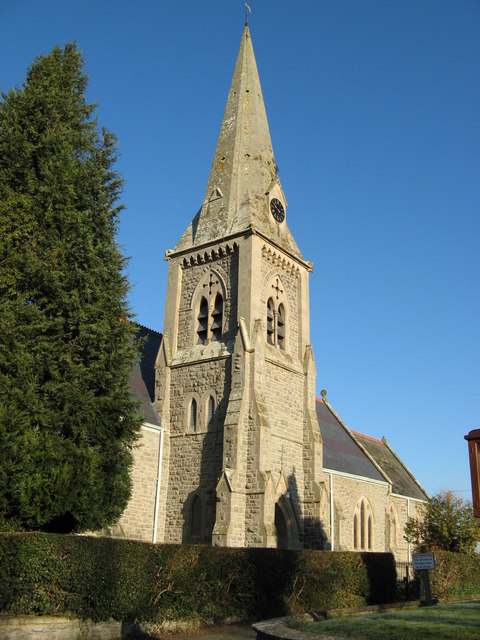
St Tysul's Parish Church

The medieval church of St Tysul formerly stood on the hillside overlooking the village. It was extensively rebuilt in the 18th century with round arched windows and roof dormers. Now only a stone porch with an 18th-century doorway remains, standing in the churchyard.

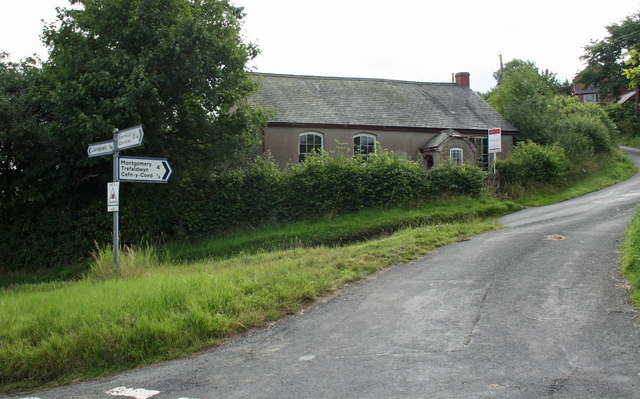
Bethesda Presbyterian Chapel

The current St Tysul's church, by the architect Thomas Henry Wyatt, was built between 1863–66. Its nave has polished red granite columns, with red sandstone and white limestone blocks used to decorate the stone arches. Its chancel arch is in Early English style.

The village's Wesleyan chapel, with Gothic windows, has been converted into a house.

The Bethesda Presbyterian Chapel, Cefn y Coed, was founded in 1840. It was closed in 2008 and is currently unused.

=== Other buildings ===
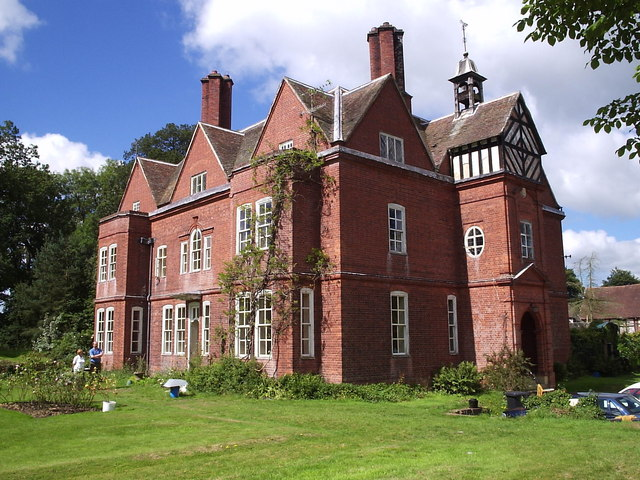
Cefn Bryntalch

- Cefn Bryntalch. Built between 1867–69, this house by G F Bodley is an important early example of the Queen Anne revival. The house was completed by Philip Webb. The client was Richard Jones, who had made a fortune in the flannel trade. It is a Grade II* listed building and its Victorian garden is listed, also at Grade II*, on the Cadw/ICOMOS Register of Parks and Gardens of Special Historic Interest in Wales. The hall was home to the composer Peter Warlock in the early 20th century.
- Rectory. Built between 1812–14 by the Shrewsbury architect Joseph Bromfield and modified in 1858 by Thomas Penson, it has a well-preserved Regency design. In 1865, the east range was added to match by Thomas Garland, clerk of works to Thomas Henry Wyatt. The building is Grade II listed.
- Former School (now the Village Hall), opposite the church and built at the same time. Thomas Henry Wyatt was the architect.
- Phipp's Tenement. A three-bay farmhouse built of substantial square-timber framing, with a dormer gable dated 1630.
- Plas Robin. An old stone house which stood on the opposite side of the road to Phipp's Tenement. Demolished in 1972.
- Oak House and Smithy, built mainly of local Llandyssil siltstone and dating c.1700, with surviving “Montgomeryshire” iron-framed windows. It was possibly an inn, and was later the village shop owned by the Varley family, which closed in 1959–60.

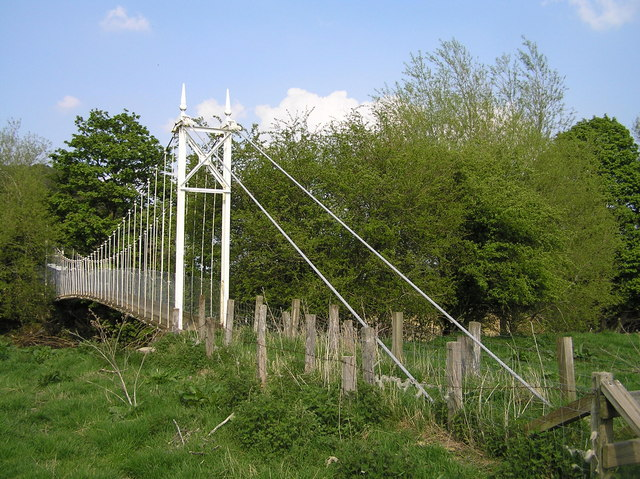
River Severn, Fron footbridge - geograph.org.uk - 923467

- The Upper House. Built as a pub before 1849. The village quoits court was behind the pub until 2003.
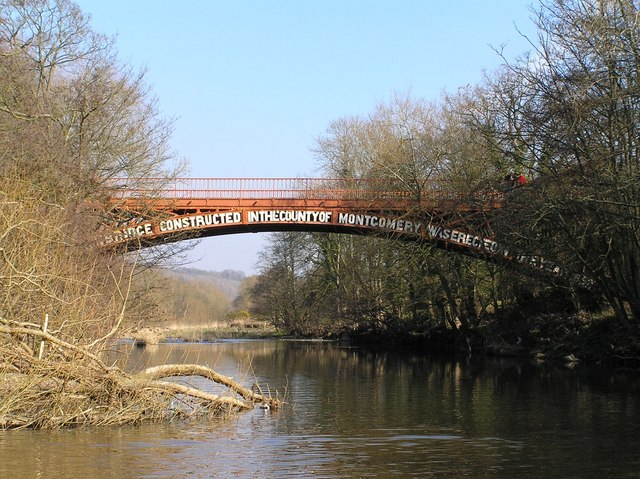
  River Severn, Brynderwen road bridge - geograph.org.uk - 659348

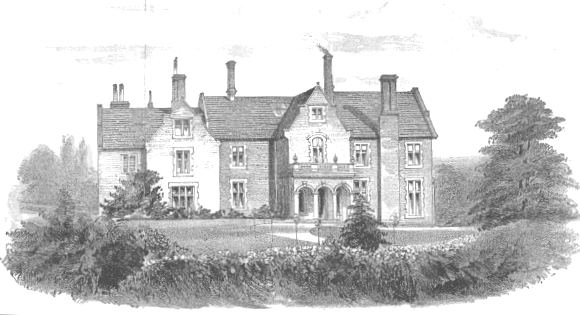
Print of Fronfraith Hall, Llandyssil, 1870

- Brynderwen Bridge. Built in 1852, close to Abermule, this is a single 109-ft span across the river Severn (and a smaller span across the canal) on five iron girders. Designed by Thomas Penson. The bridge came from Brymbo ironworks near Wrexham, and would have been transported to the site by the Montgomeryshire Canal. Grade II* listed.
- Fron Footbridge. An elegant iron suspension footbridge over the Severn, taking a footpath from Severn Villa to Lower Llegodig Farm. Built in 1926 by David Rowell & Co. of London.
- Middle Llegodig. Timber-framed lobby-entry house of c. 1700, a late example of its type.
- Fronfraith Hall, designed by James Pickard of Shrewsbury, c. 1860. Its west wing burnt down in 1966.

== Quoiting ==
Playing quoits was a widespread pastime in many rural areas. It had largely died in much of England by the Second World War, but after the War enjoyed a revival in Mid-Wales, when the quoits were made by a light engineering company in Newtown. In Llandyssil the 'old' or 'long' quoits rules were followed. The quoits court was moved to behind the Upper House pub by 1983, where Wales beat Scotland in an international match. In a 1991 international match at Llandyssil, Wales convincingly beat Scotland 252 to 83. The last championship match was held at Llandyssil in 2003, after which the court was closed.

== Sheep dog trials ==
The 2012 Welsh National Sheep Dog Trials were held on the field by the bridge at Henfron, Llandyssil, between 19 and 21 July 2012.

== Notable people ==
- Rear Admiral Sir Charles Thomas Jones (1778–1853), Royal Navy officer and High Sheriff of Montgomeryshire in 1832.

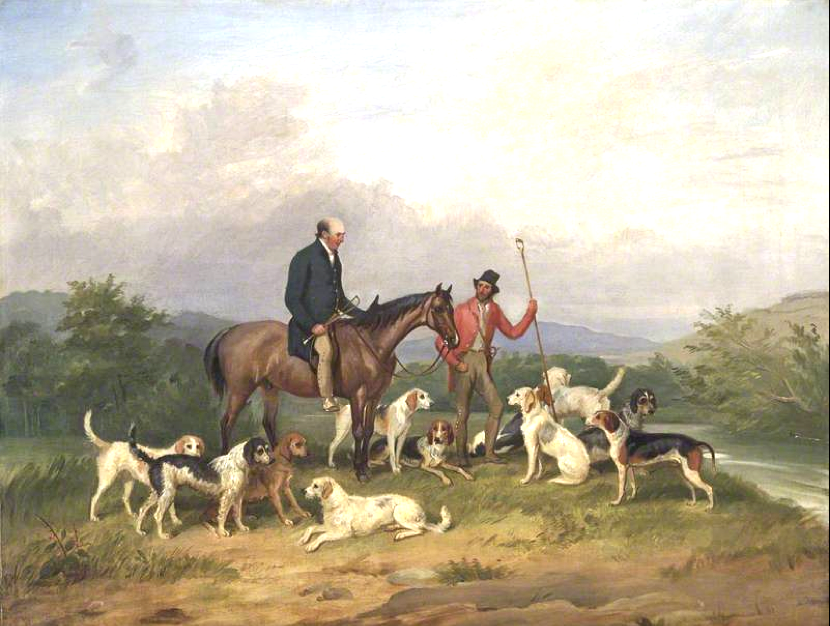
Otter Hunt - John Lloyd of Abermule and George Thomas, by Thomas Weaver ca.1817

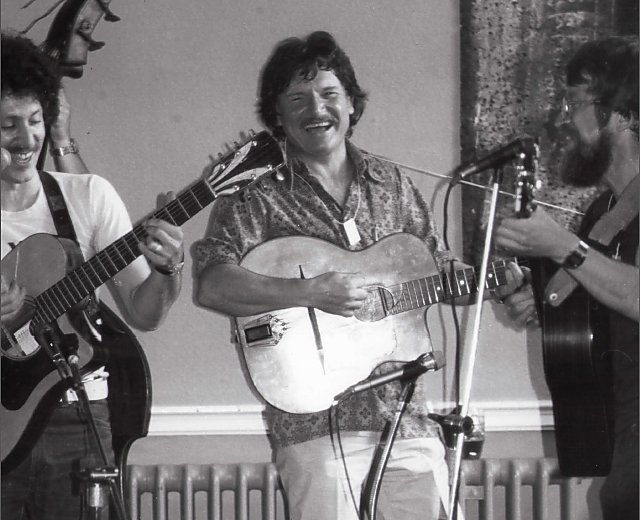
Diz Disley, 1981)

- George Thomas (1786–1859), writer and poet, was the first postmaster of Llandyssil. In 1817 he wrote a poem about otter hunting, commemorated by a painting in the National Museum of Wales.
- Brigadier General Lumley O W Jones (1876–1918), British Army General
- Rupert Davies (1879-1967), Canadian politician and newspaper editor; owned Fronfraith Hall between 1932 and 1948
- Peter Warlock (1894–1930), composer, lived at Cefn Bryntalch, where he composed many works; also played the organ in Llandyssil church
- Nigel Heseltine (1916–1995), writer and colonial administrator brought up at Cefn Bryntalch
- Diz Disley (1931–2010), jazz guitarist, lived in Oak Cottages in the 1930s
- John Billington (born 1936), high jumper
- Julie Christie (born 1940), actress, lived at Whitehall Farm, Cefn y Coed from 1981–2010
- Iolo Williams (born 1962), naturalist and TV presenter, lives in Llandyssil

== Gallery ==
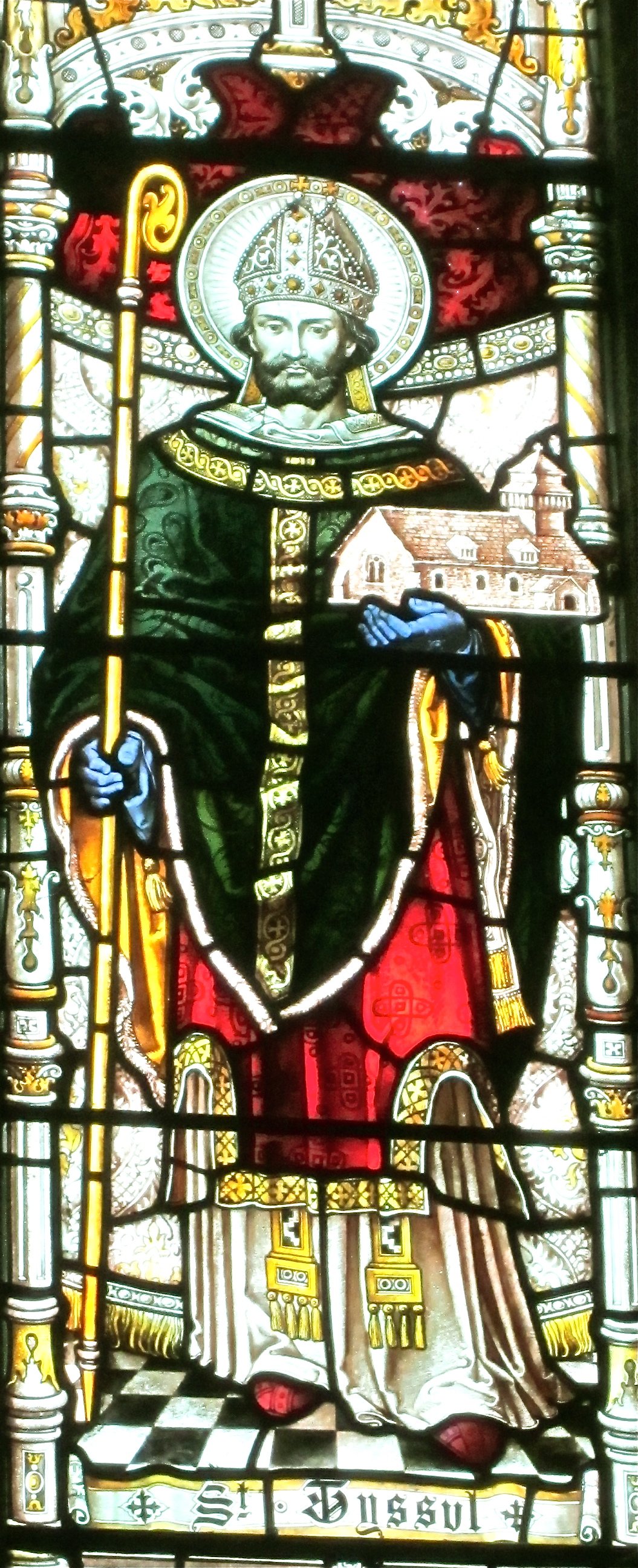
St Tyssul, Montgomery church

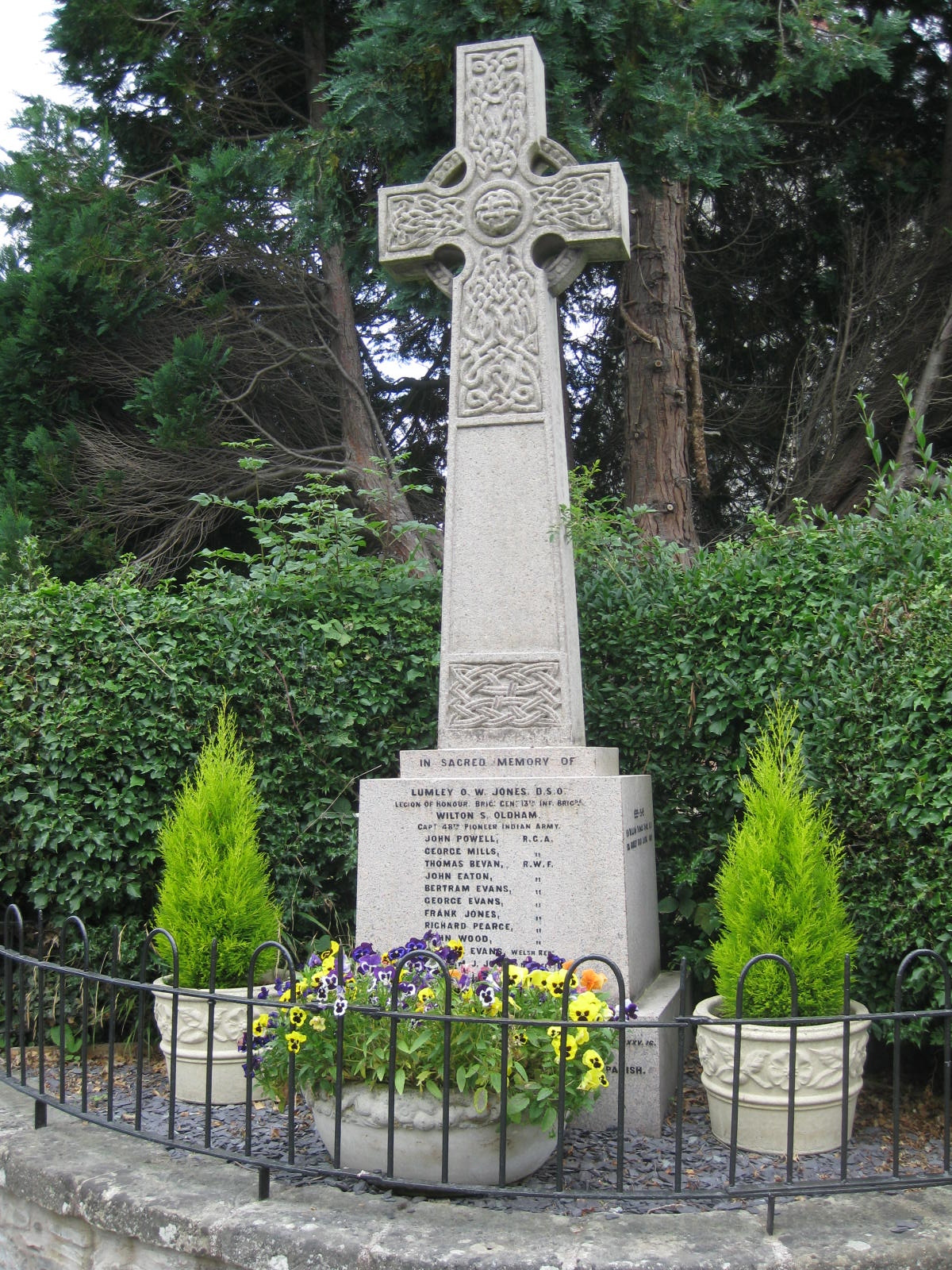
Llandyssil War Memorial

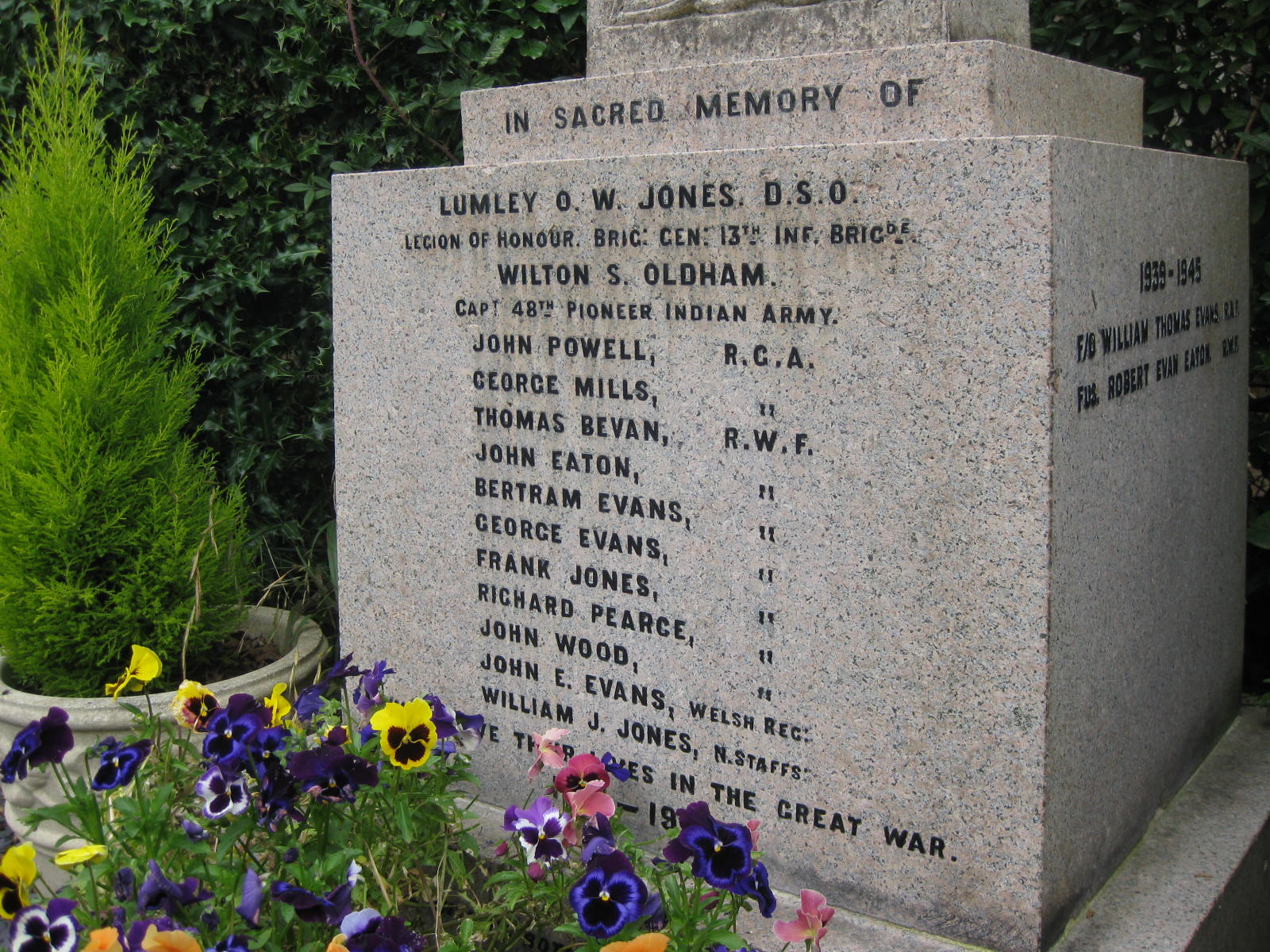
Llandyssil War Memorial - the 1914–18 War

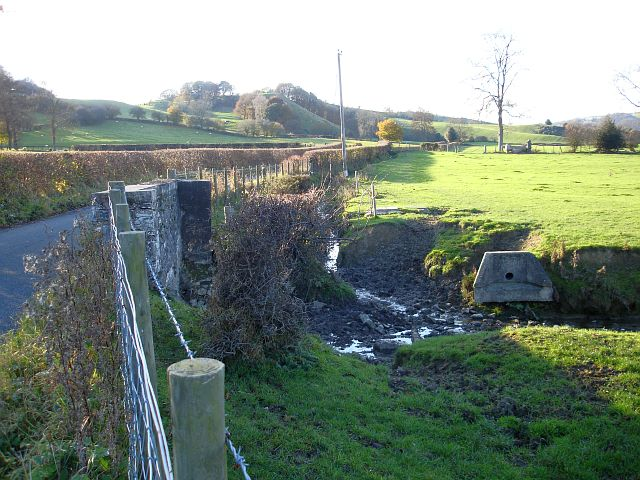
Llandyssil Bridge

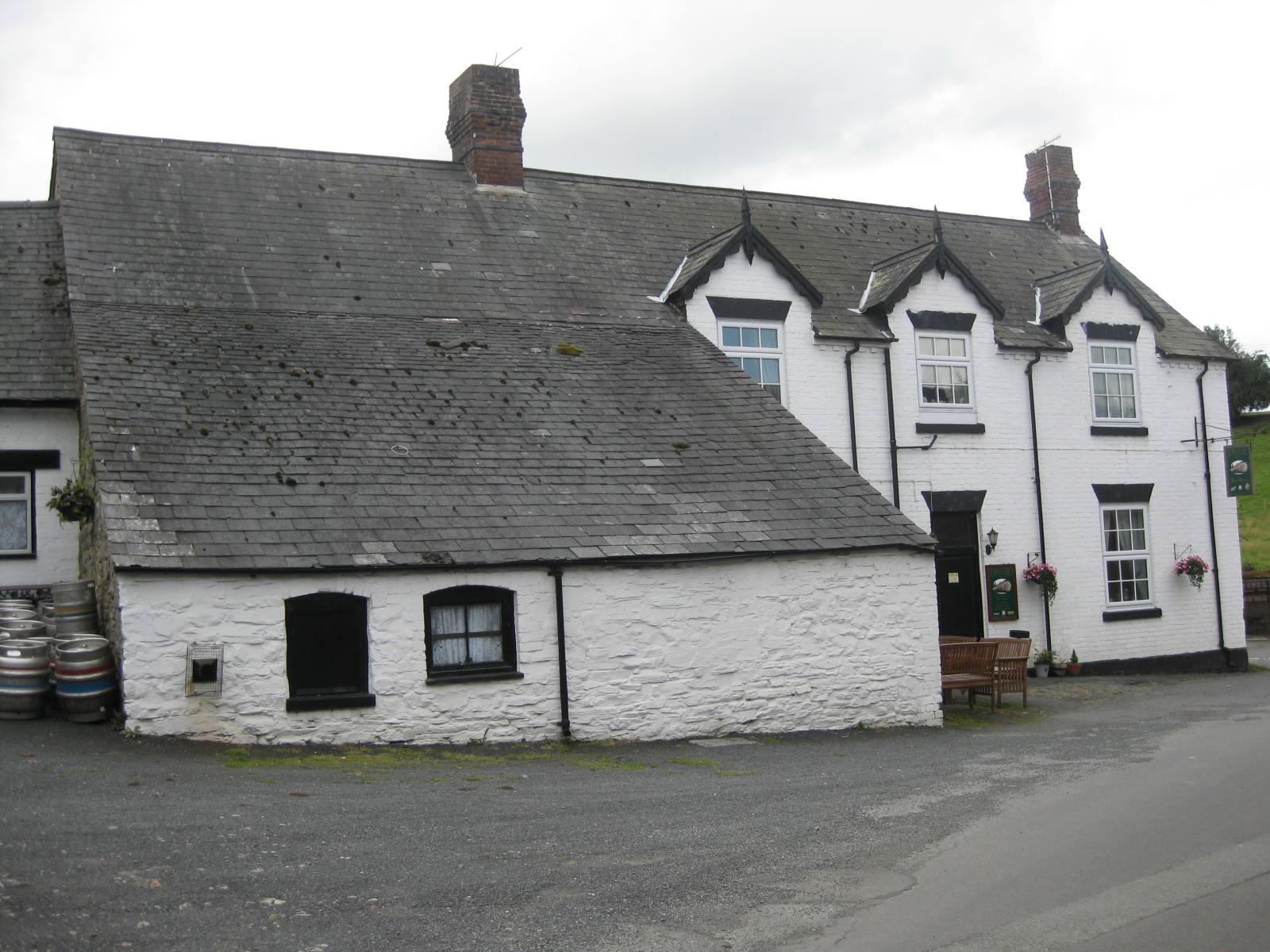
The Upper House, Public House, Llandyssil

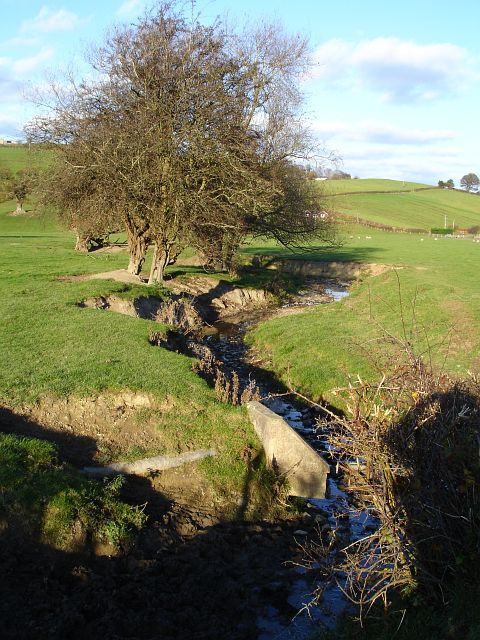
Brook from Llandyssil Bridge

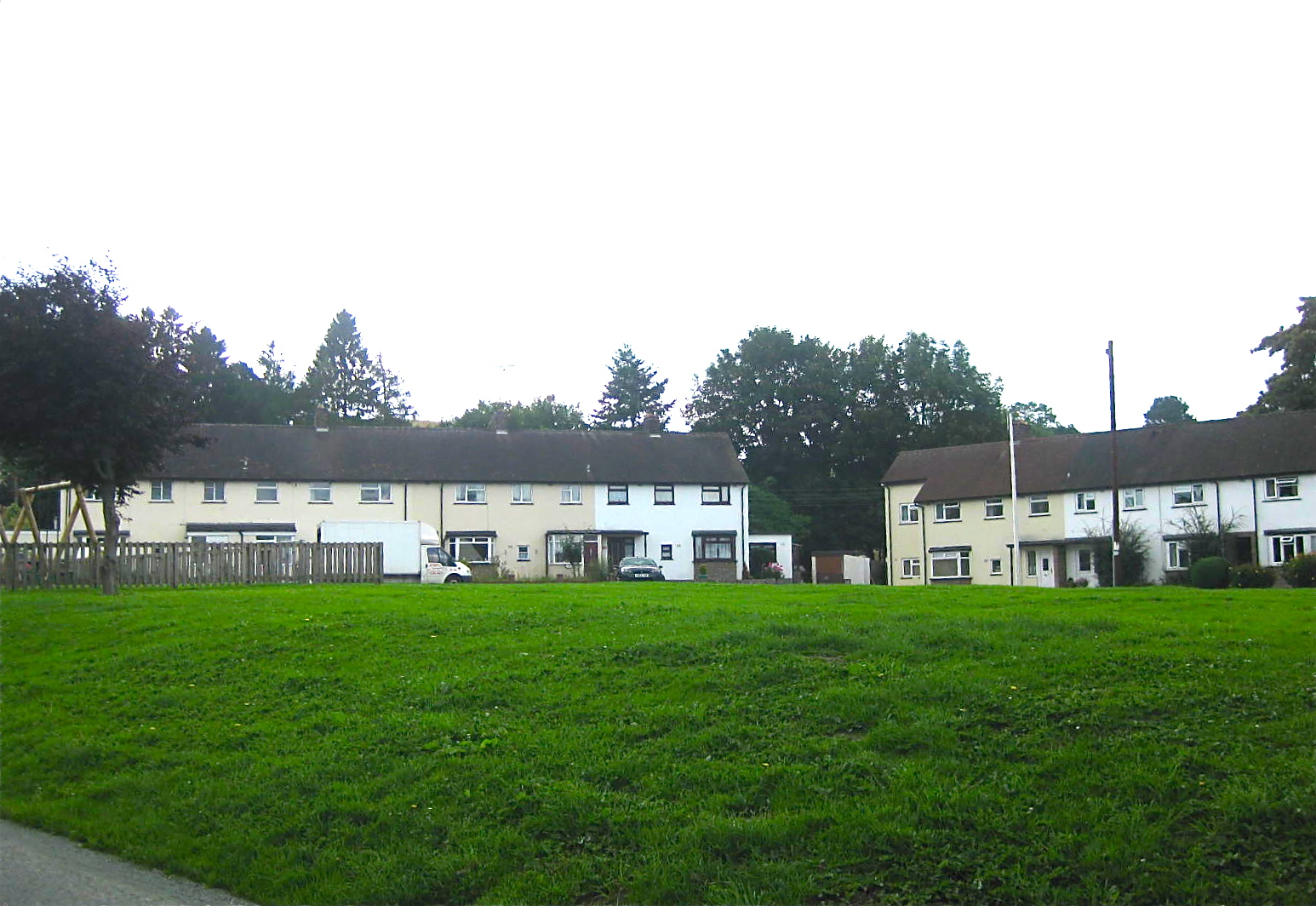
Brooklyn, Llandyssil

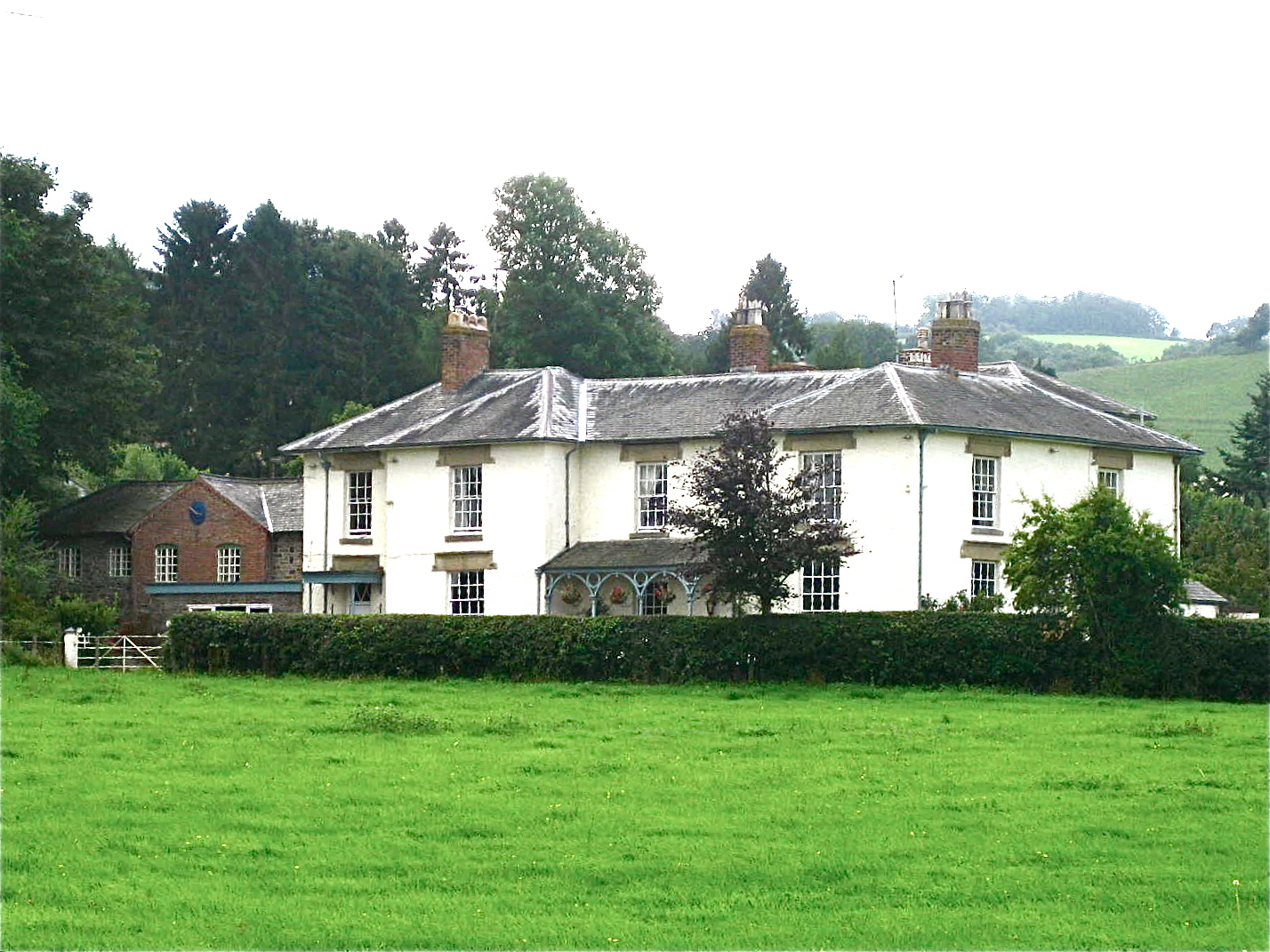
The Old Rectory, Llandyssil

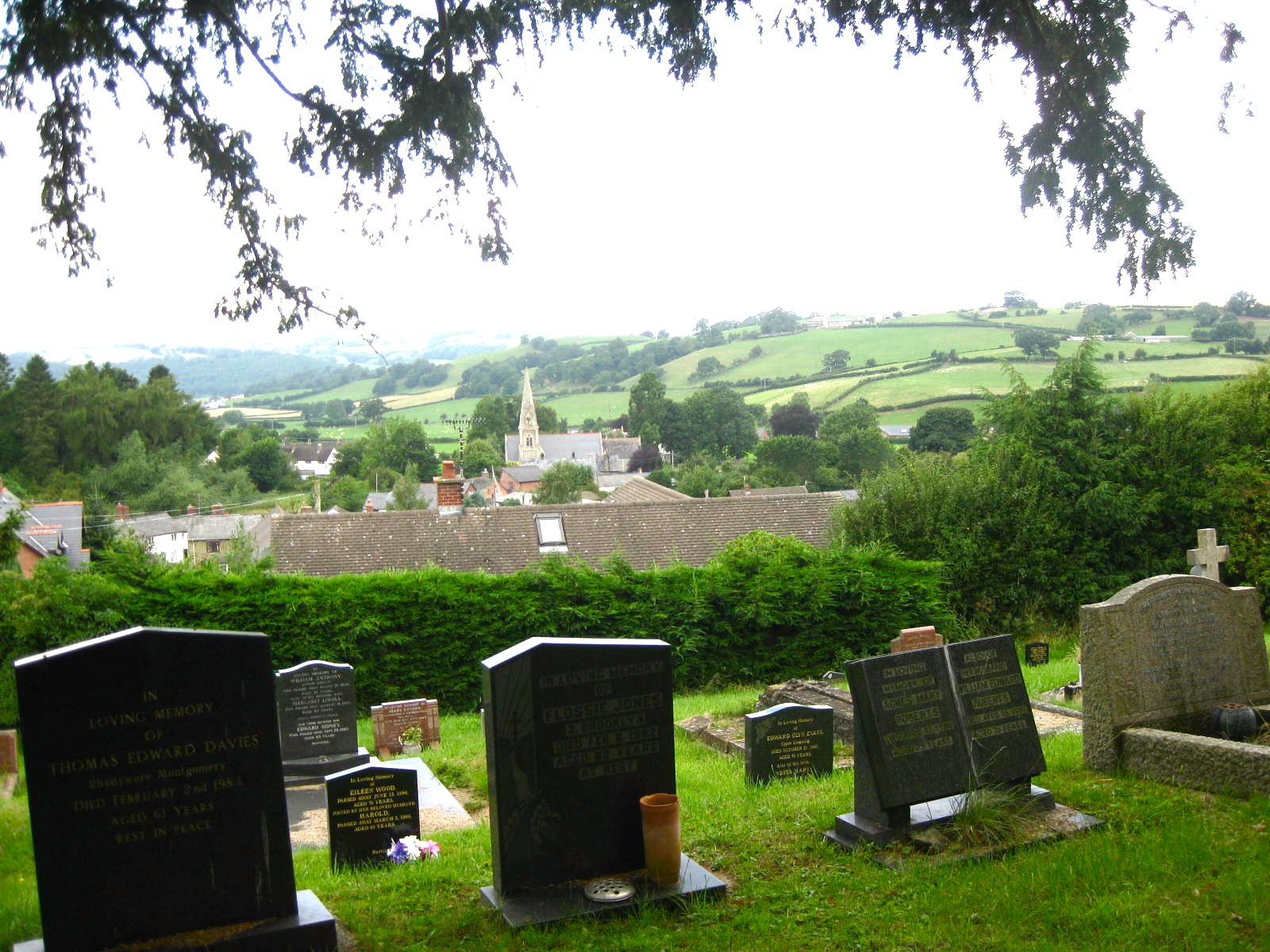
View over Llandyssil from the old churchyard.

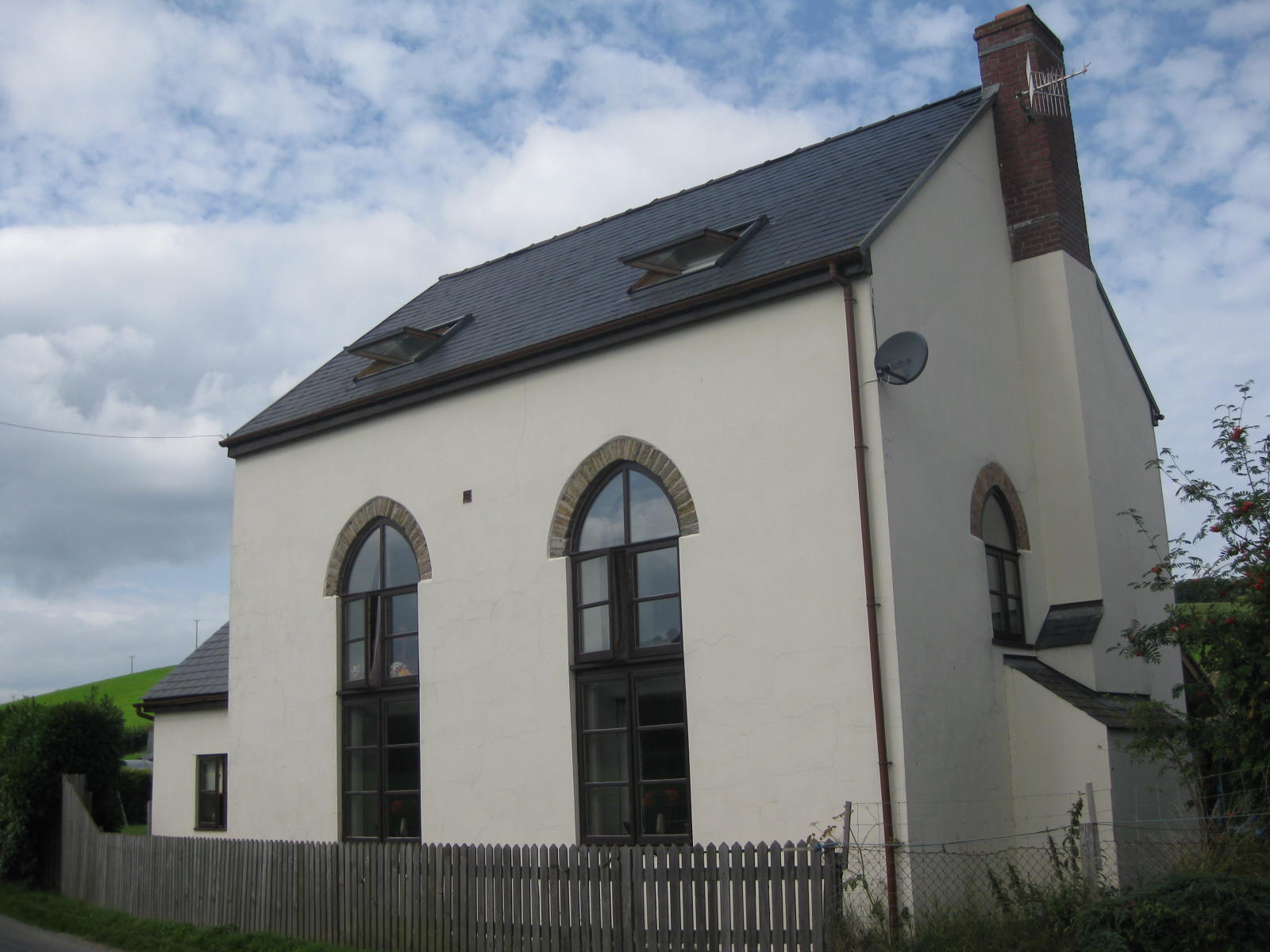
The Former Wesleyan Chapel, Llandyssil

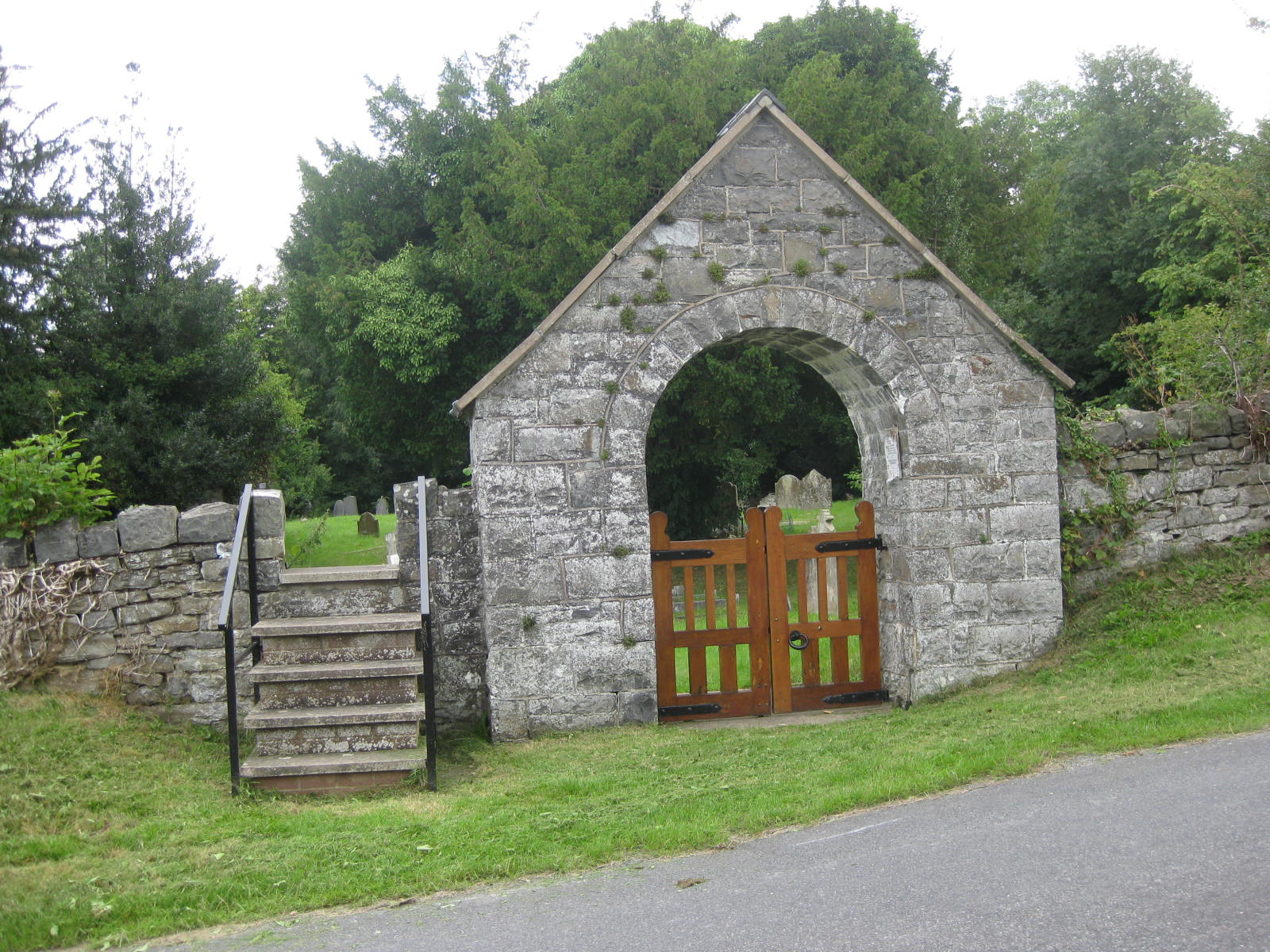
Lych Gate, St Tysul's Old churchyard, Llandyssil

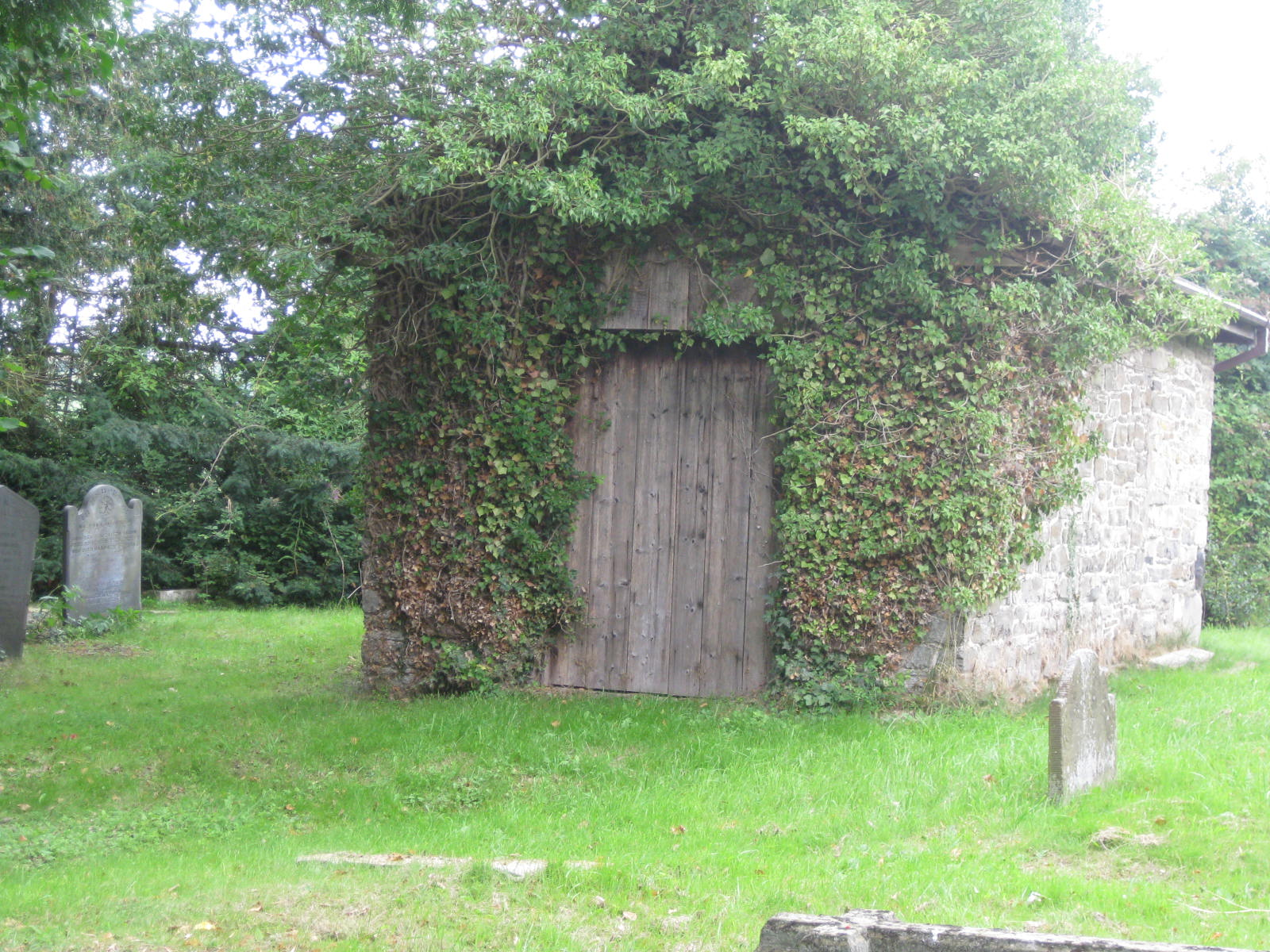
The re-built porch of the Old Church, Llandyssil

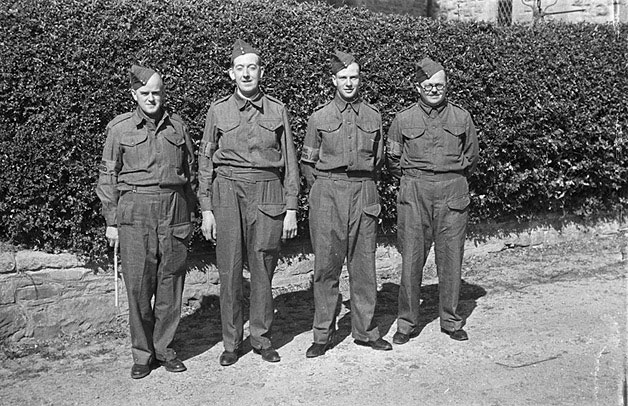
Llandyssil Home Guard after a Church Parade at Parish Church

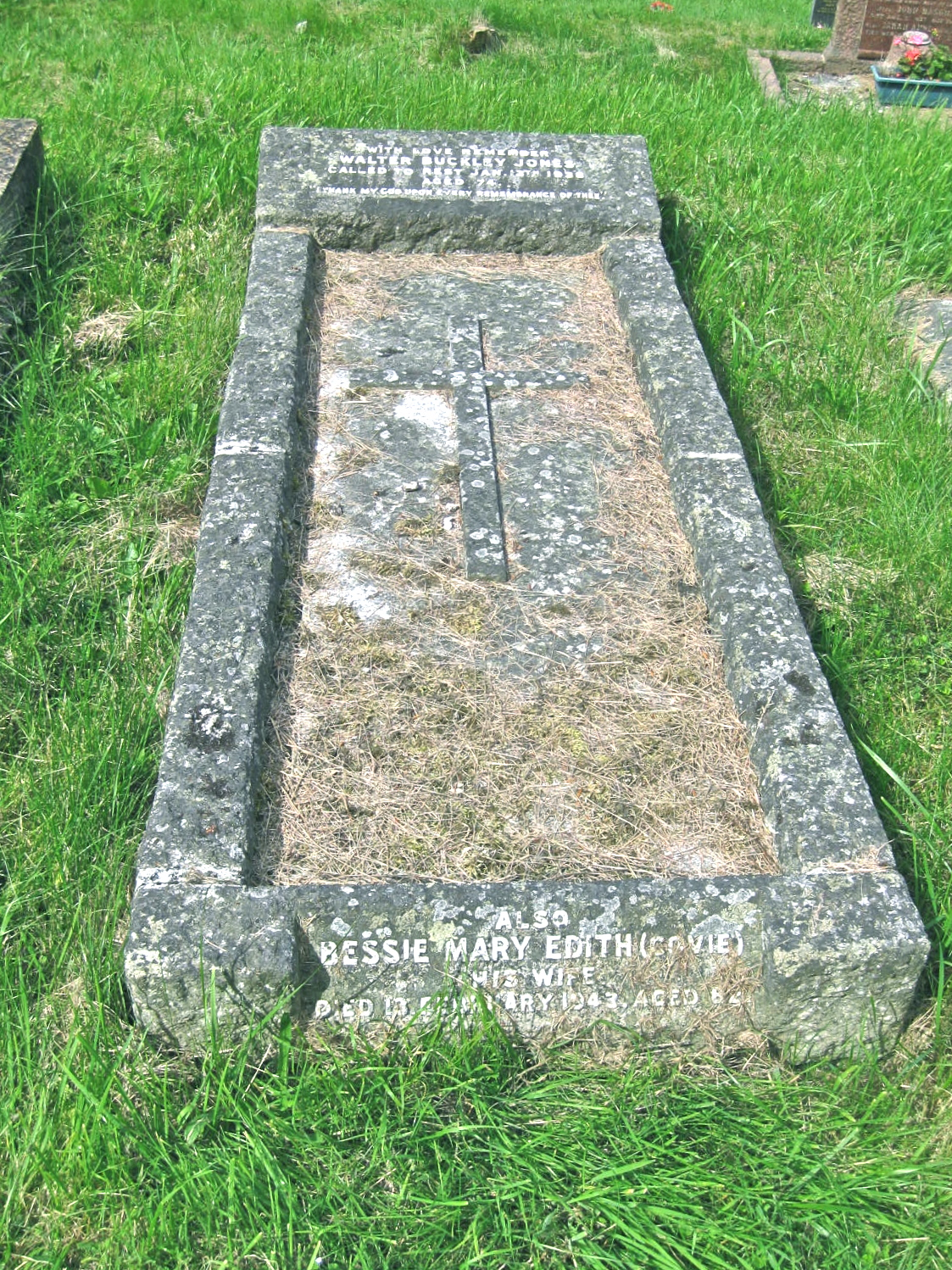
Llandyssil Churchyard. Grave of Walter Buckley Jones and wife Edith

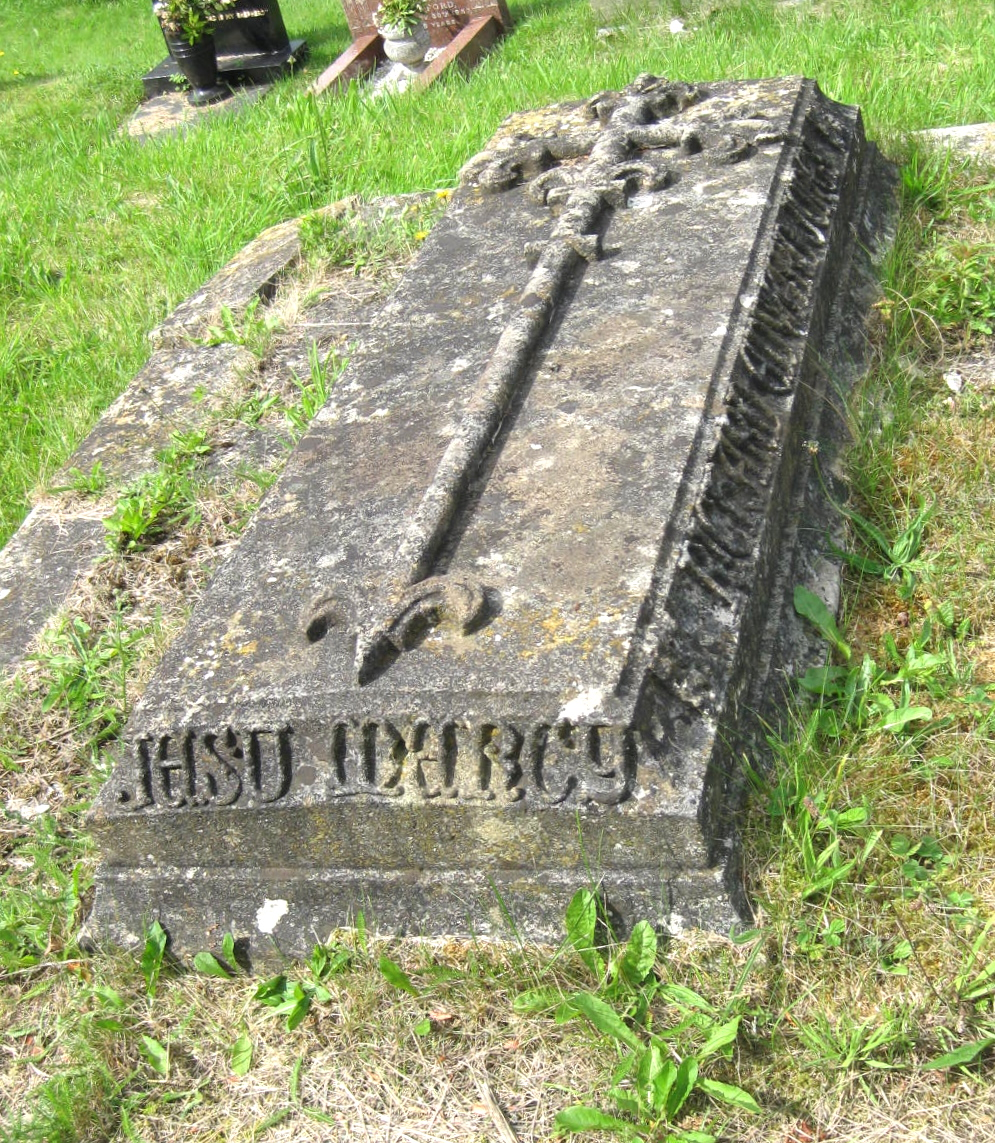
Llandyssil Churchyard. Grave of Richard Jones and wife Catharina.

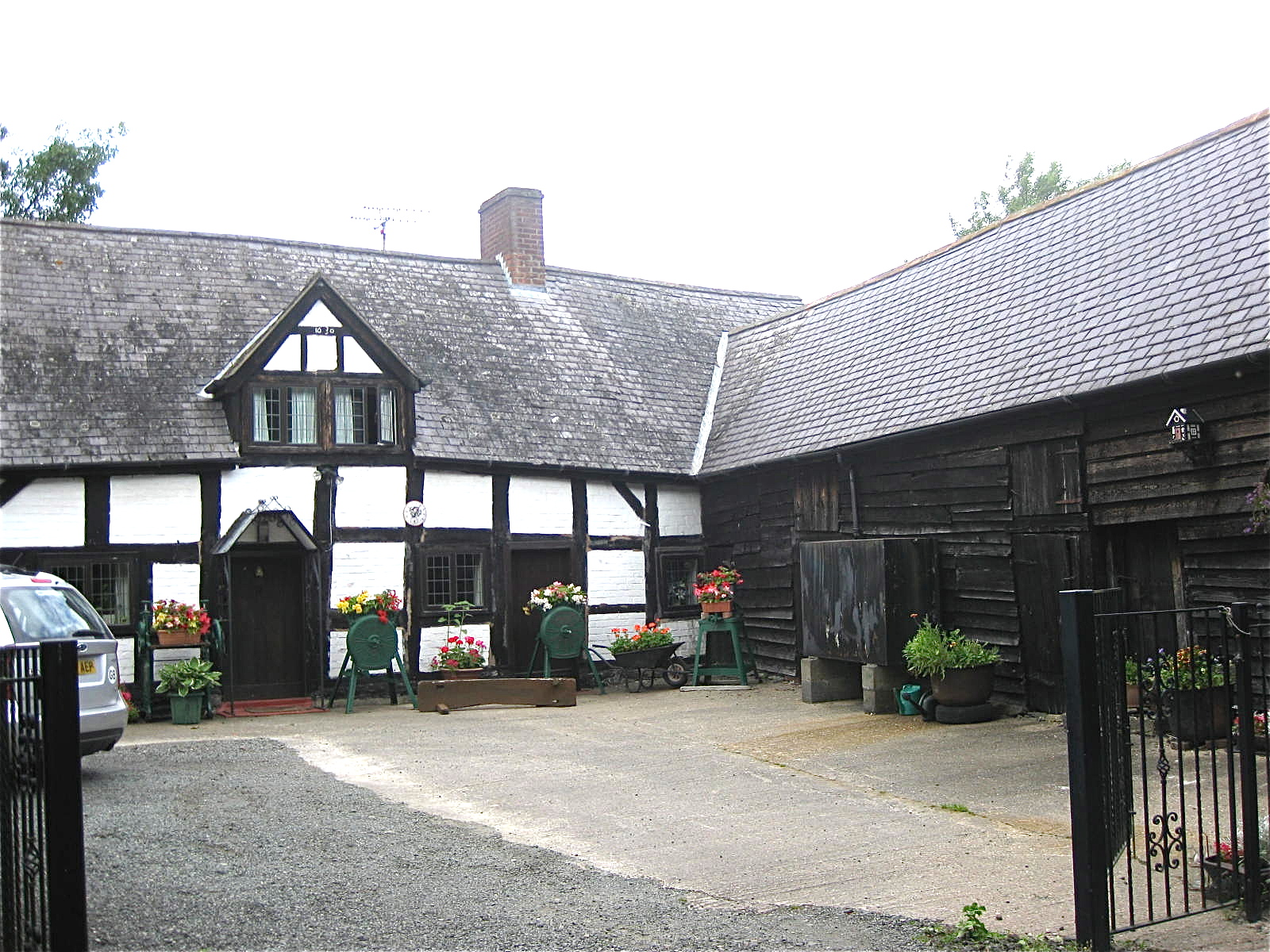
Phipp's Tenement and Barn, Llandyssil

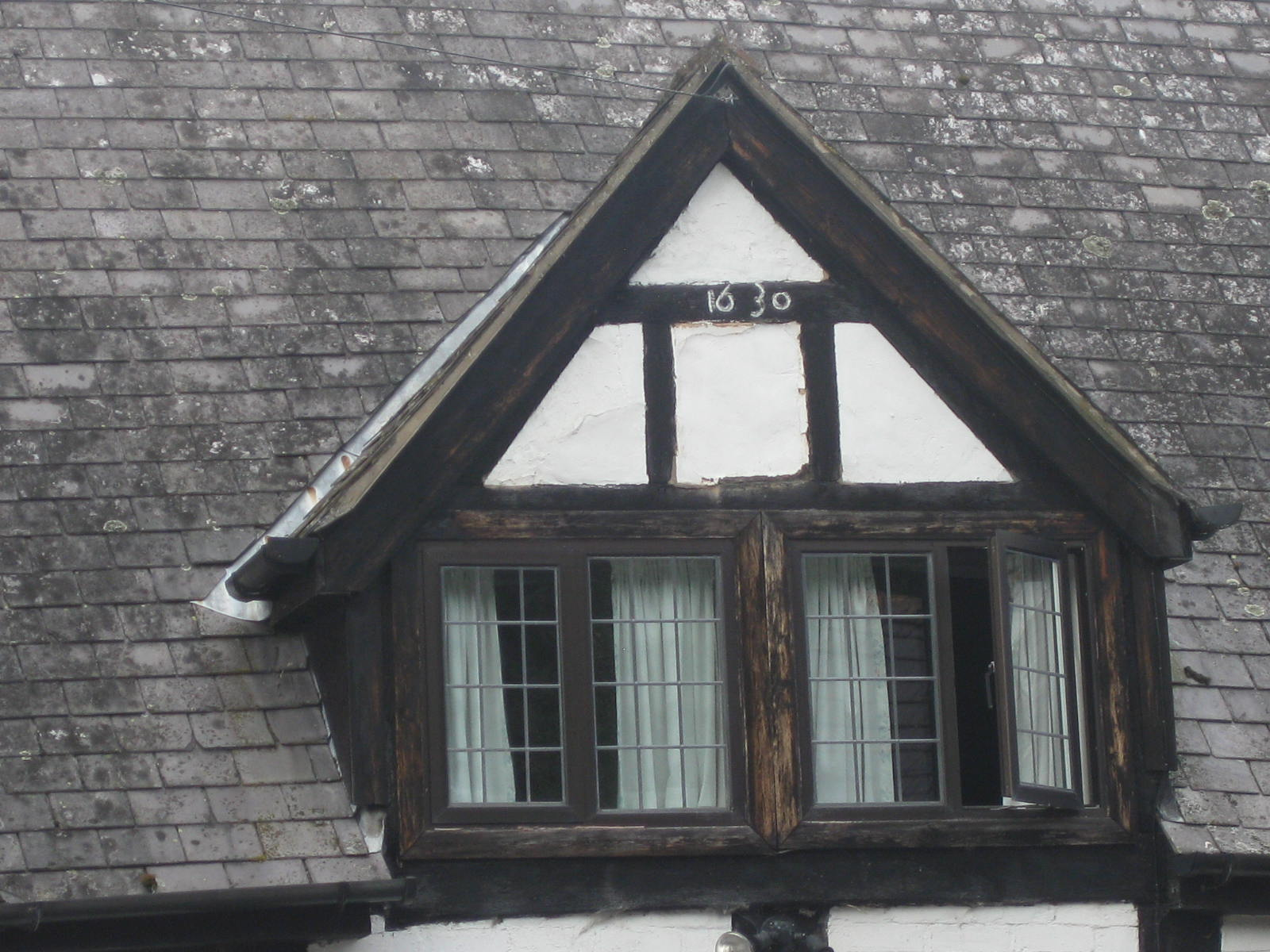
Dormer Window dated 1630, Phipp's Tenement, Llandyssil
