= Tysul =

6th-century Welsh saint

Saint Tysul
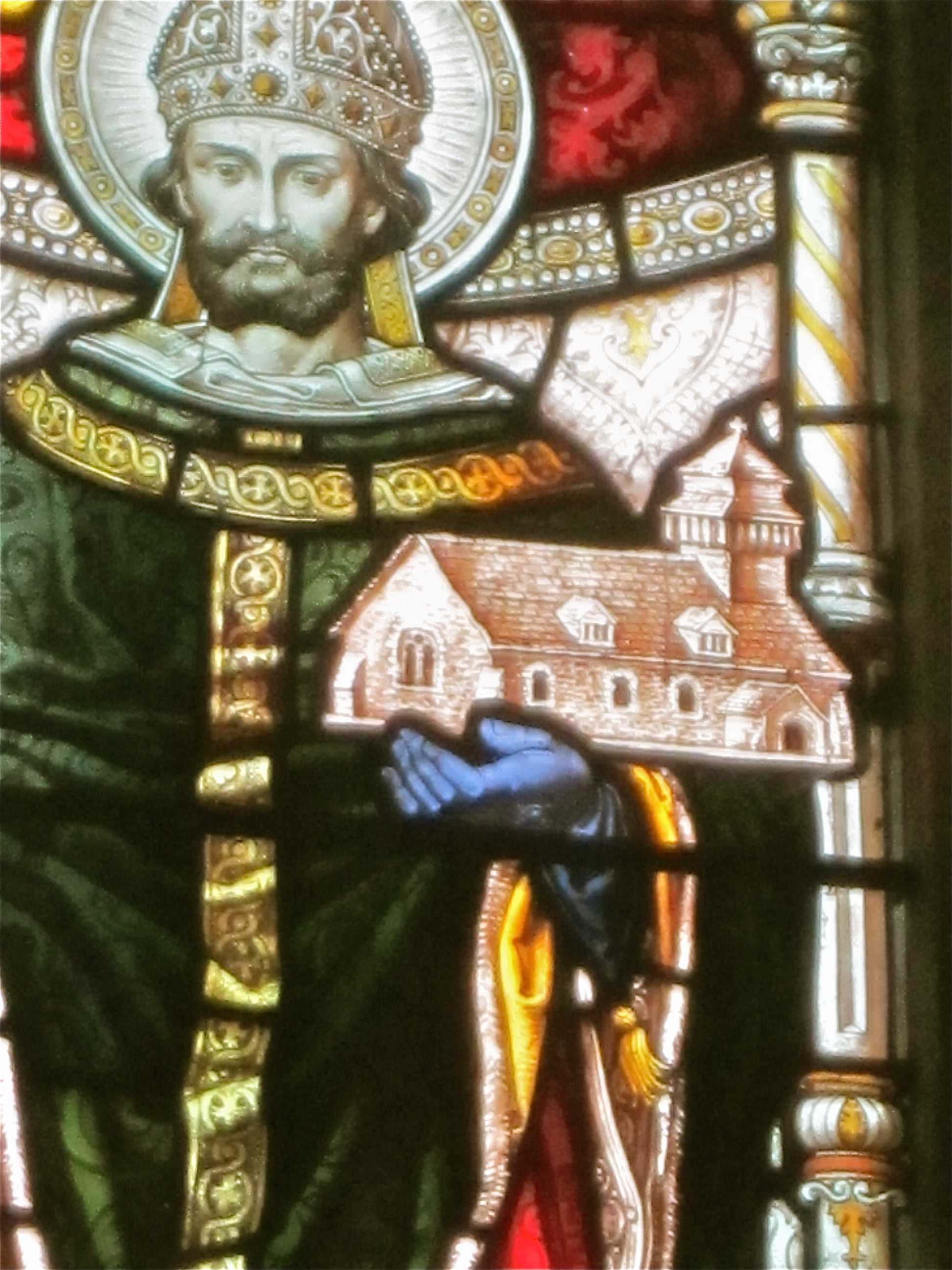
- Window in Montgomery Church showing St Tyssul holding the Old Church in Llandyssil
- Born: c. 470 AD
- Venerated in: Anglican Communion
- Canonized: pre-canonical
- Feast: 31 January

Tysul was a 5th-century pre-canonical saint and patron saint of the churches of Llandysul in Ceredigion (Cardiganshire) and Llandyssil in Maldwyn (Montgomeryshire), Powys. Tysul’s full name was Tysul ap Corun ap Cunedda – or son of Corun, son of Cunedda. His feast day is 31 January.

== Life ==
His full name was Tysul ap Corun ap Cunedda – or in English Tysul son of Corun, son of Cunedda and he was born around 462 AD.

He died in 554 and today he is remembered in the church of Llandyssil, and the 13th-century church of Llandysul in Ceredigion.

== Tysul's Church ==
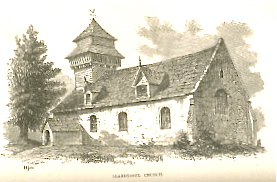
Old St Tysul's Church, Llandyssil c1855. Engraving from a drawing by Harry Longueville Jones. Arch Camb, 1884, p. 91

Tysul built a church in Llandyssil, Powys. It was located on a hillside to the south east of the village. and today its remains are still within a roughly circular graveyard, which is still in use.

The south porch is the only surviving part of St. Tysul's church, which was replaced in 1866 by a new church on the north west side of the village. His church was renowned for its timber belfry, and there was strong contemporary feeling against its demolition and replacement.

== Gallery ==
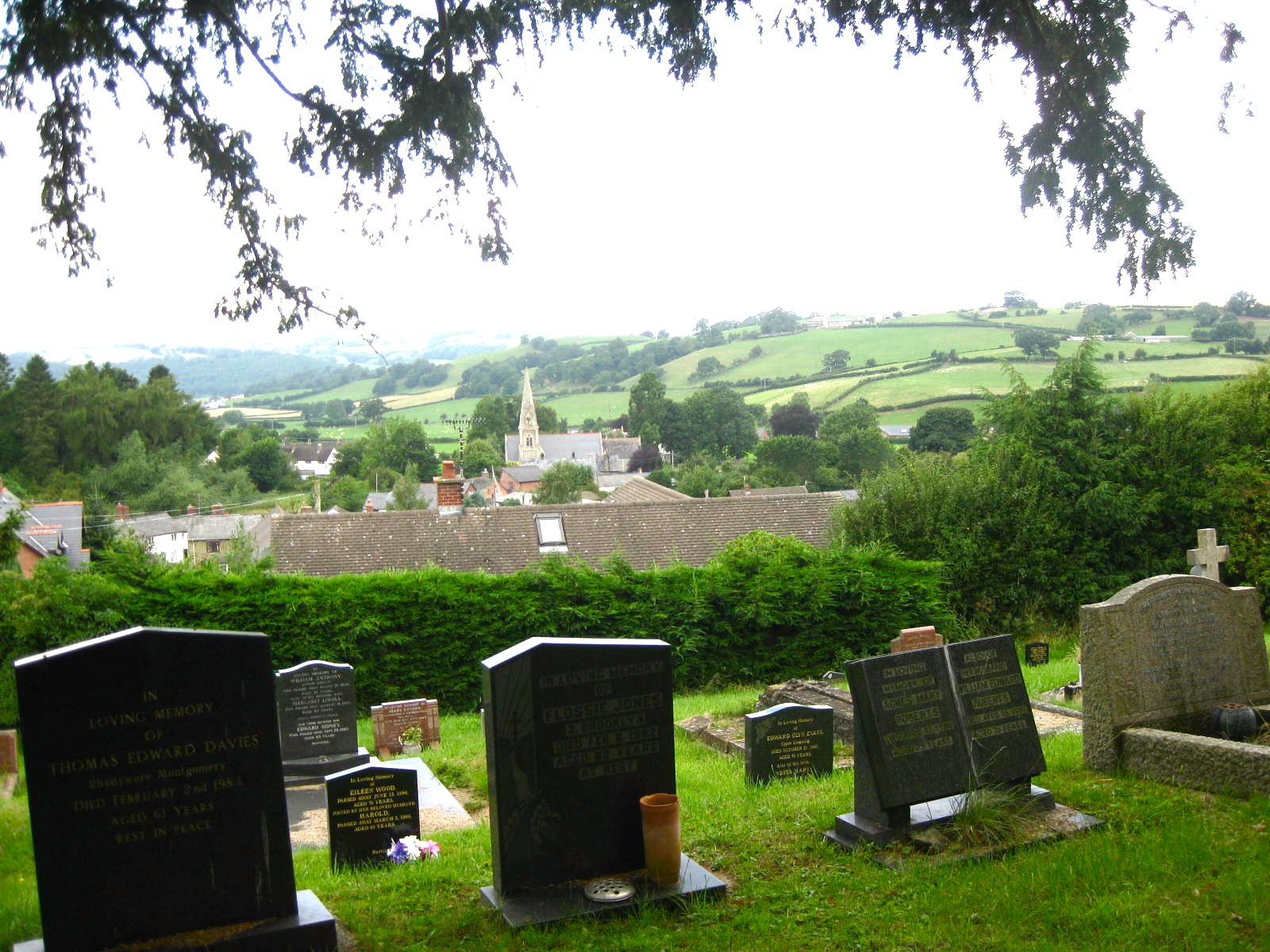
View over Llandyssil in Montgomeryshire from the old churchyard

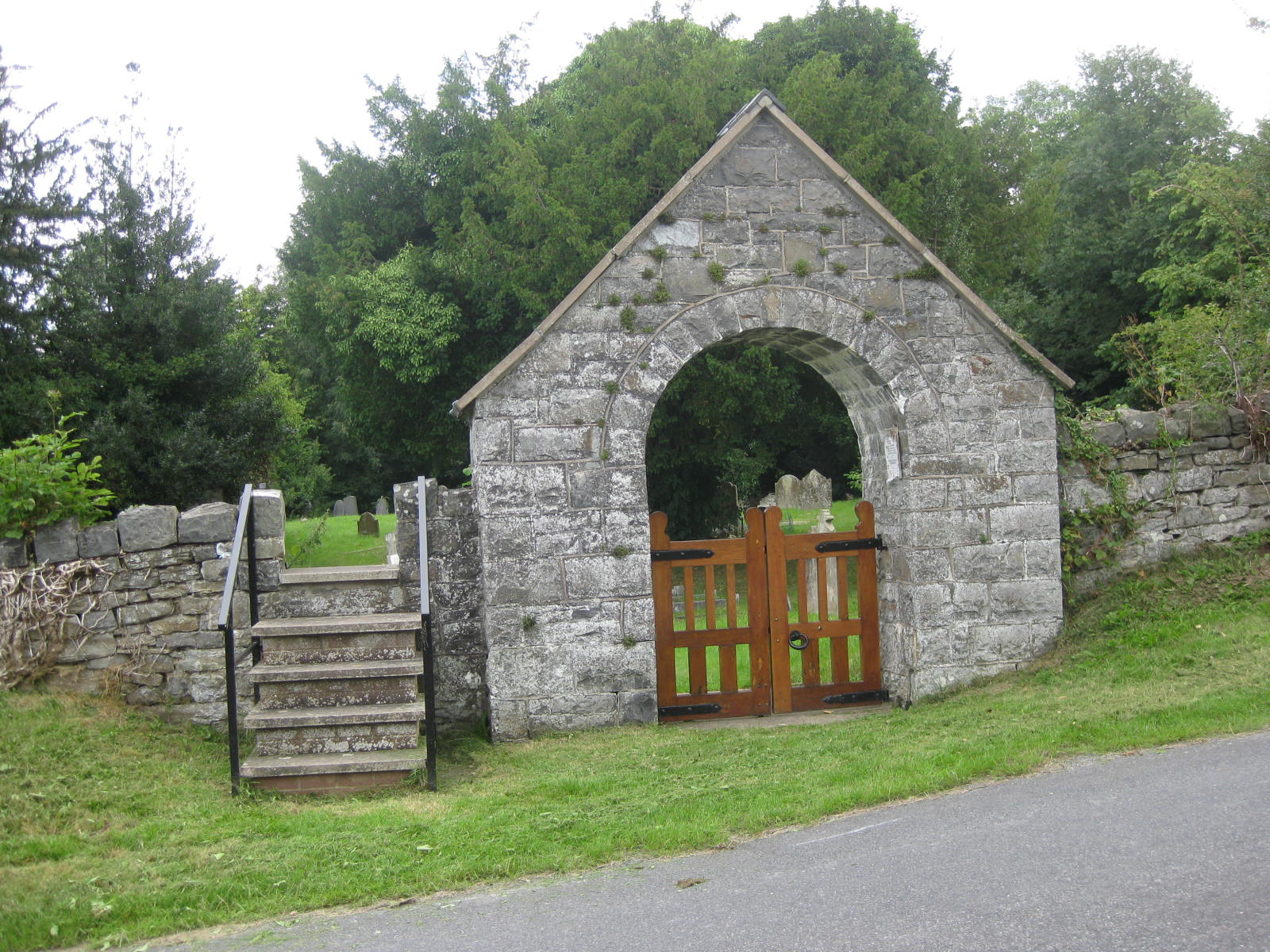
Lych Gate, St Tysul's Old churchyard, Llandyssil

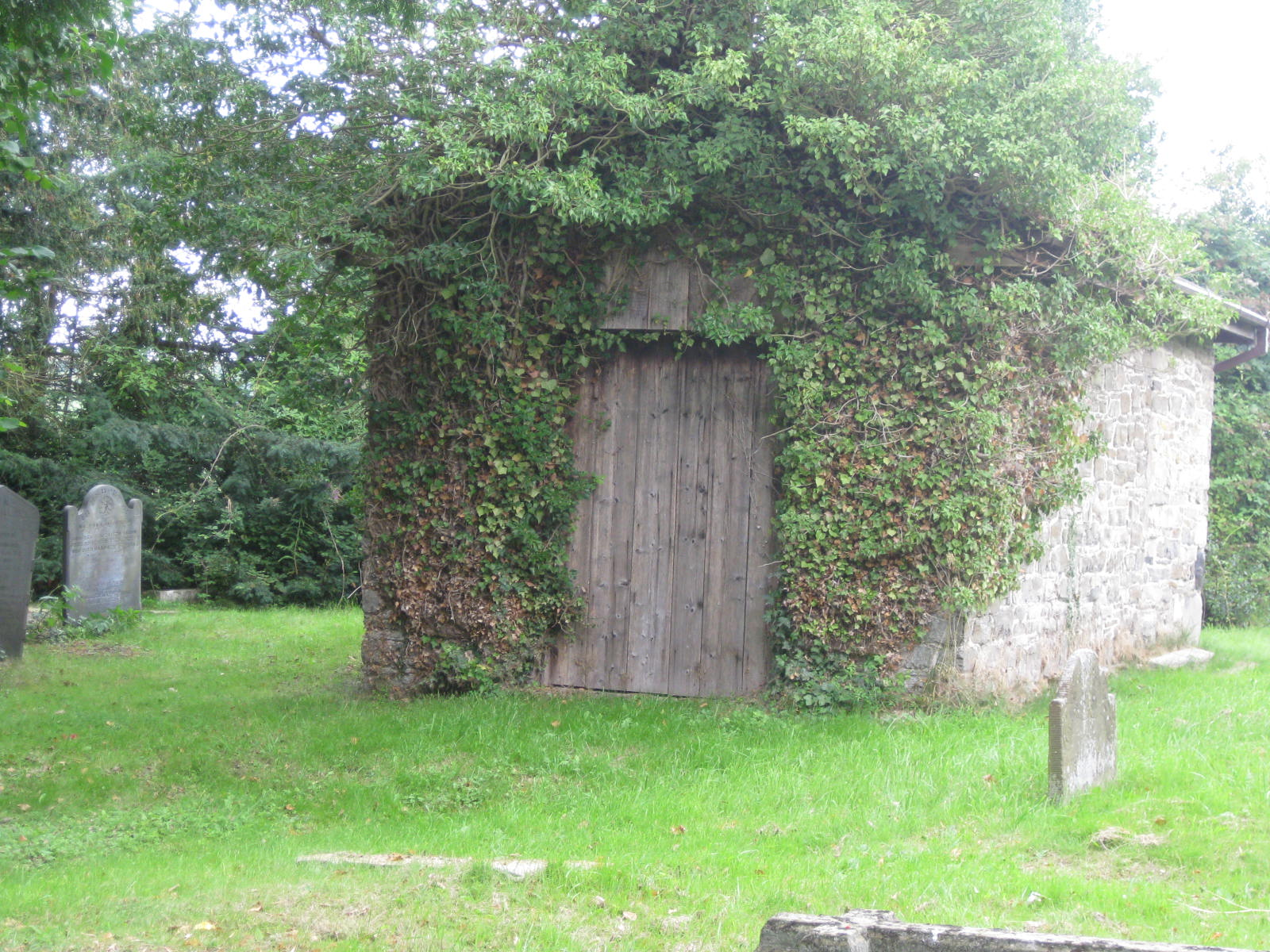
The re-built porch of the Old Church, Llandyssil

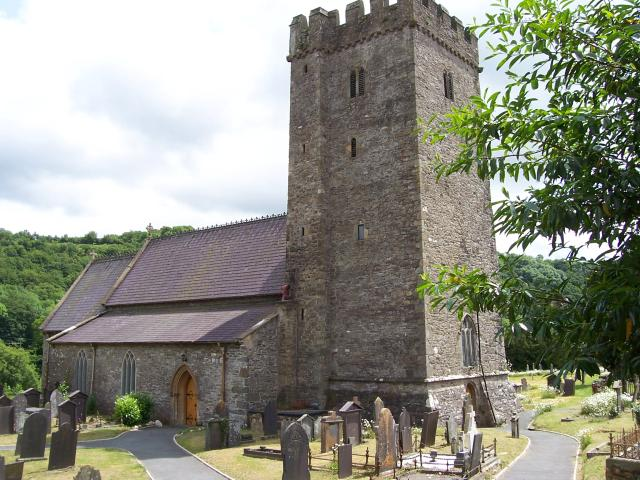
13th-century St Tysul Church, Llandysul, Ceredigion

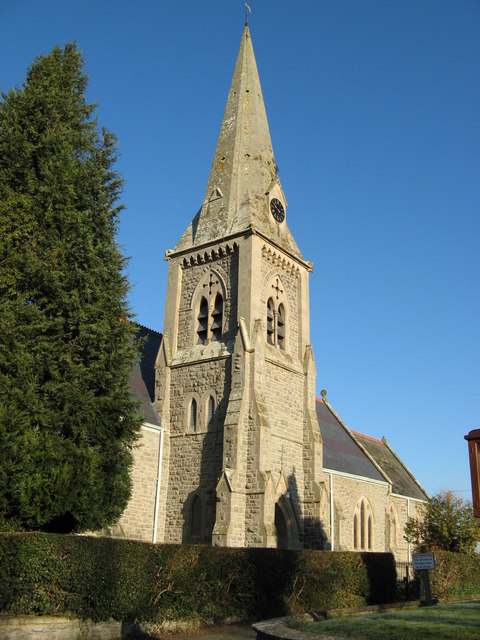
New Church of St Tysul, Llndyssil
