= Abermule =

Coordinates: 52.5441°N 3.2367°W

Abermule: Welsh: Aber-miwl
- Location within Powys
- Population: 900
- OS grid reference: SO162947
- Community: Abermule with Llandyssil
- Principal area: Powys
- Preserved county: Powys
- Country: Wales
- Sovereign state: United Kingdom
- Post town: Montgomery
- Postcode district: SY15
- Dialling code: 01686
- Police: Dyfed-Powys
- Fire: Mid and West Wales
- Ambulance: Welsh
- UK Parliament: Montgomeryshire and Glyndŵr

Abermule (Welsh: Aber-miwl) is a village lying on the River Severn 6 km (4 miles) northeast of Newtown in Powys, mid Wales. The A483 Swansea to Chester trunk road, the Cambrian Line railway, connecting Aberystwyth to Shrewsbury, and the Montgomery Canal, close to the river, all pass through Abermule. The village had a population of 900 as of the 2011 census.

The village is part of the Abermule with Llandyssil community.

== Amenities ==
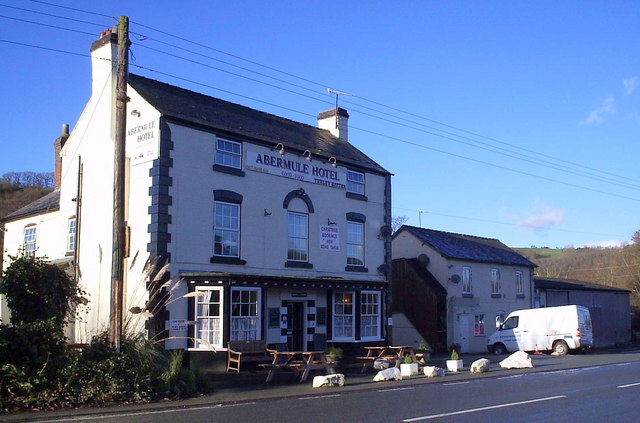
The Abermule Hotel

The village has one primary school – Abermule CP School; previously called Dolforwyn CP School – a caravan park, a growing number of new houses, a community centre/playing fields, two parks for children, a bowling green, two tennis courts, and one pub – The Abermule Inn. Abermule is also home to Wales's first privately owned natural burial site, Green Lane Burial Field.

== History ==
Nearby are the remains of Dolforwyn Castle, the only castle built by the last native prince of Gwynedd of direct descent, Llywelyn ap Gruffudd, Prince of Wales. In 2006 a Roman Road was found while building the Felin Hafren estate.

== Transport ==
=== Rail ===
Abermule railway station was closed as part of the Beeching cuts in 1965. The Cambrian railway users group has called for the reinstatement of this station. Abermule had earlier been the junction for a short branch railway to Kerry, closed in 1956.

The Abermule train collision on 26 January 1921 killed 17 passengers, including a Cambrian Railways director, Lord Herbert Vane-Tempest of Machynlleth.

=== Bus ===
Abermule is served by regular bus services to Llanidloes, Montgomery, Newtown, Rhayader, Shrewsbury, and Welshpool.

== Notable residents ==
- Composer Philip Heseltine, pseudonym Peter Warlock, lived at Abermule before and after the First World War.
- Jack Fairweather (writer), was raised in Abermule. War correspondent and winner of 2019 Costa Book of the Year with The Volunteer.

== Sport ==
=== Football ===
Abermule FC, who play behind the Primary School in the centre of Abermule, has been part of the Montgomeryshire football scene since 1970 and enters its 50th year in 2020. The current team plays in the Mid Wales Football league.
