= Barmouth Bridge =

Railway bridge across the Mawddach estuary

Barmouth Bridge Pont Abermaw
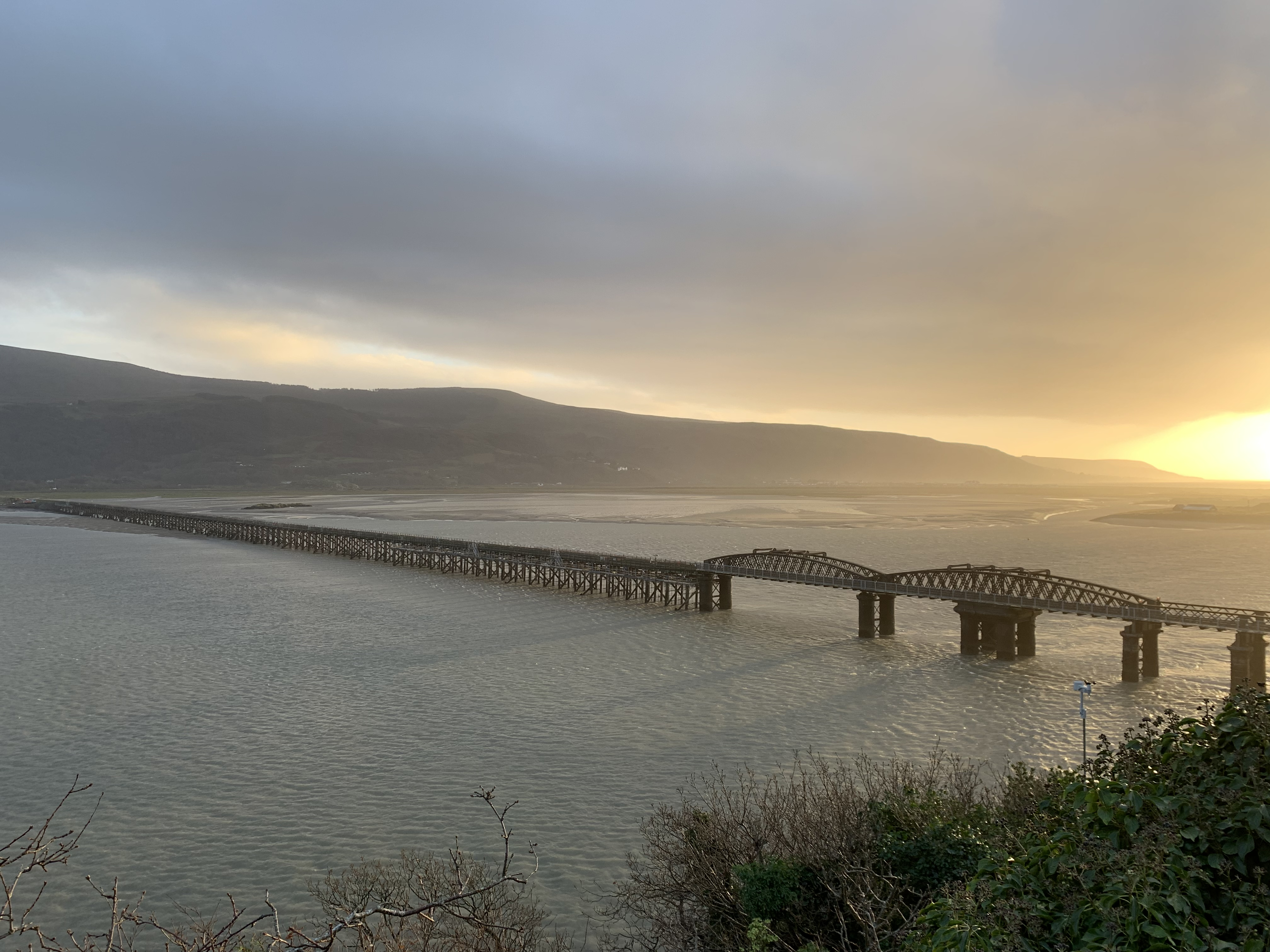
- View of the bridge from above Barmouth
- Coordinates: 52.714°N 4.039°W
- Carries: Cambrian Coast Line, pedestrians, cycles & motorcycles
- Crosses: Afon Mawddach
- Locale: Gwynedd, Wales
- Heritage status

Listed Building – Grade II*
- Designated: 22 March 1988
- Reference no.: 5207

Characteristics
- Total length: 900 yards (820 m): 764 yards (699 m) timber/130 yards (120 m) metallic

History
- Opened: 1867

Location
- Interactive map of Barmouth Bridge

Barmouth Bridge (Welsh: Pont Abermaw), or Barmouth Viaduct (Welsh: Traphont Abermaw), is a Grade II* listed single-track wooden railway viaduct across the estuary of the River Mawddach near Barmouth, Wales. It is 900 yards (820 m) long and carries the Cambrian Line. It is the longest timber viaduct in Wales and one of the oldest in regular use in Britain.

Barmouth Bridge was designed by and constructed for the Aberystwith and Welsh Coast Railway on its line between Aberystwyth and Pwllheli. Work was authorised in 1861 and commenced in 1864. On 10 October 1867, the completed bridge was officially opened. Following the discovery of severe corrosion on underwater sections of ironwork, an intensive restoration programme was performed between December 1899 and late 1902. By 1980, the viaduct was under attack by marine woodworm, which led to concerns that it would have to be closed and demolished. Because of its value to tourism, it was repaired between 1985 and 1986, a closure of six months; a weight restriction and ban on locomotive-hauled trains were also introduced. These restrictions have been relaxed since 2005.

The viaduct, between Morfa Mawddach and Barmouth stations in Gwynedd, is used by rail, cyclists, motorcyclists and pedestrians and is part of the National Cycle Route 8. There is no provision for road traffic. Tolls were collected for foot and cycle traffic up to 2013, but this has been voluntary since 2017.

To allow the passage of tall ships, the bridge originally incorporated a drawbridge, which was replaced by a swing bridge between 1899 and 1902. When the viaduct was refurbished again between 2020 and 2023, the swing-bridge mechanisms were not restored.

== Location ==
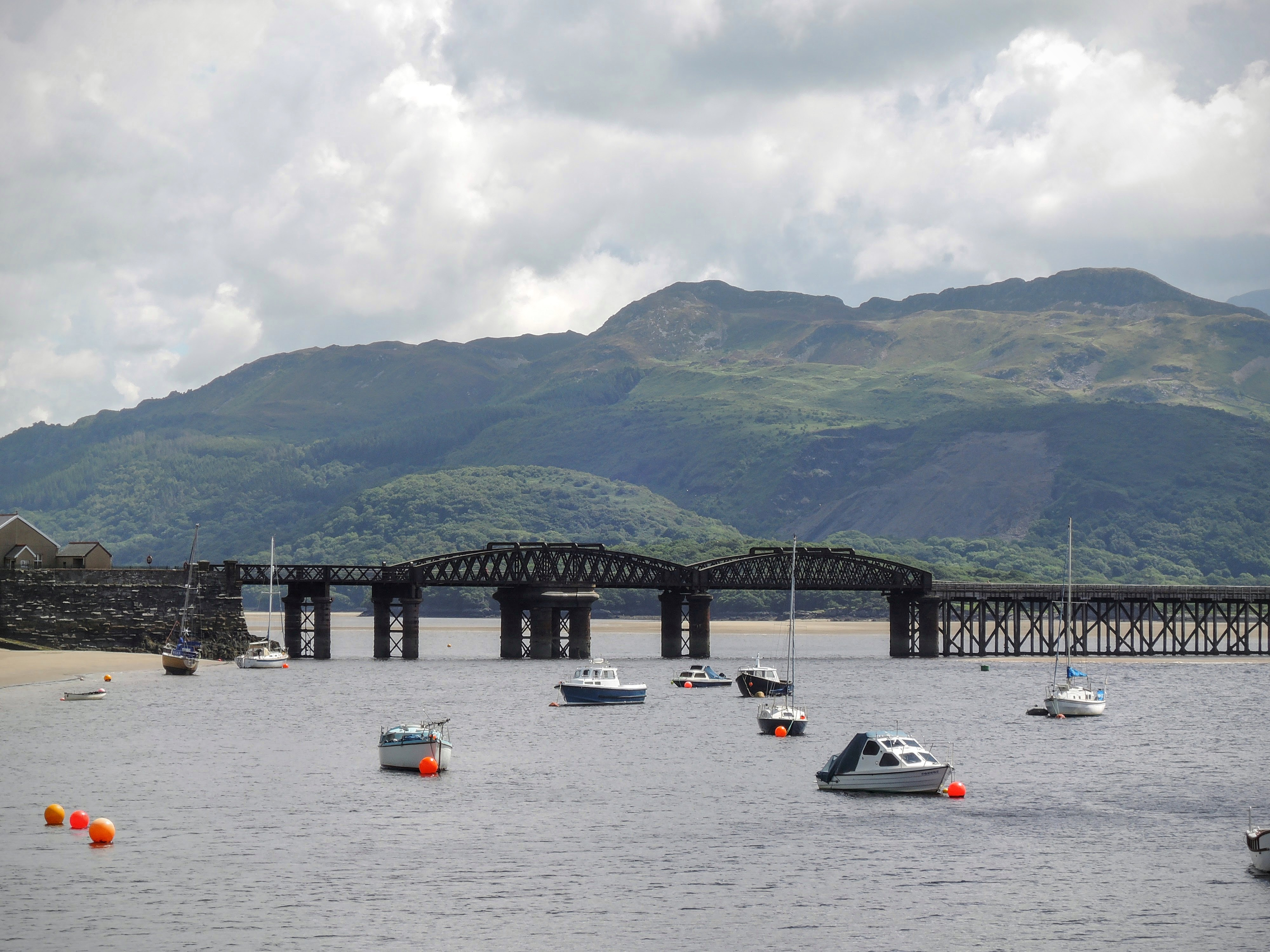
From 1902 until 2023, the north end of the crossing had a swing-bridge section to allow tall ships to pass.

Barmouth Bridge crosses the estuary of the Afon Mawddach between Barmouth to the north and Morfa Mawddach near Arthog on the south. It lies within both a Site of Special Scientific Interest and the Snowdonia National Park. The Cambrian Coast Line was operated by Arriva Trains Wales until 2018, and is now operated by Transport for Wales Rail, which provides connecting services north to Pwllheli and east to Machynlleth, Shrewsbury and Birmingham International.

The timber section of the bridge is 699 metres (764 yd) long, and is made up of 113 wooden trestles, each about 5.5 metres (6.0 yd) span, supported by cast iron piers. It is one of the longest timber viaducts standing in Britain, and has been a Grade II* listed structure since its designation on 22 March 1988.

Most of the bridge is built on top of a gravel bed, covered by shifting sand. The northern end of the viaduct, where the swing bridge is located, is next to Figle Fawr, a rock at the base of the Rhinogydd mountains. Water passing through the channel flows at up to 9 knots (17 km/h; 10 mph). The first two spans at this end are built on the rock on cast iron cylindrical piers. The steel swing bridge section, which replaced the original drawbridge, was last opened (for testing) in April 1987. The installation of continuous rail across the movable section now prevents its movement, and the passage of tall ships in and out of the estuary. All mechanisms associated with the swing bridge, however, are left in situ, in accordance with the Grade II* listing of the structure.

The nearest road across the Afon Mawddach is the toll bridge at Penmaenpool about 5 miles (8 km) upstream, which can carry vehicles up to 2.5 tonnes (5,500 lb). Heavier vehicles must use the first public road bridge, at Dolgellau, about 10 miles (16 km) from Barmouth.

Pedestrians, cyclists and motorcyclists can cross the estuary via the footbridge on the bridge's eastern side. Since 1996, the footbridge has been part of National Cycle Route 8 linking Cardiff and Holyhead. The footbridge is owned by Network Rail, and Gwynedd Council contributes 10 per cent of its annual maintenance cost in exchange for a licence to use it.

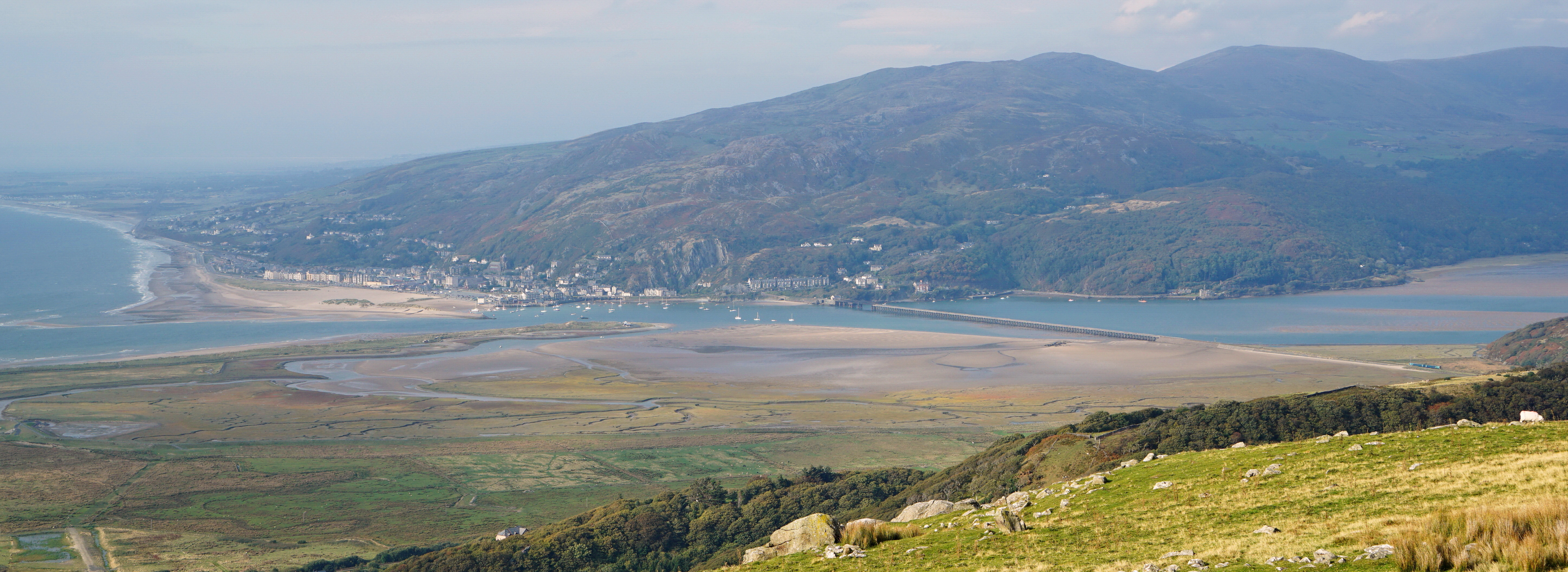
The viaduct spans the Mawddach estuary between Barmouth (left) and Morfa Mawddach station

== History ==
=== Background and construction ===
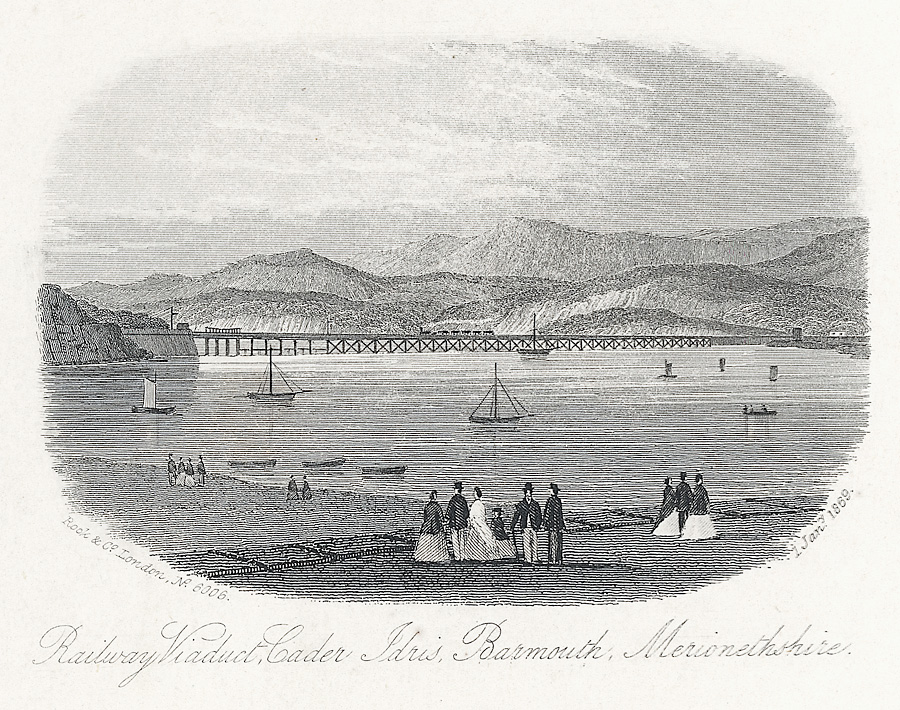
Illustration of the estuary and viaduct (with wooden drawbridge section on the left), c. 1869

A bridge across the Mawddach Estuary at Barmouth was proposed by the Aberystwith and Welsh Coast Railway, which constructed a line between Aberystwyth and Pwllheli. Authorisation for the railway was received in 1861–1862 and the detailed design of the bridge was started.

Barmouth Bridge was designed by the civil engineers Benjamin Piercy and Henry Conybeare in 1864. Conybeare decided on the use of a timber viaduct because it was about four times cheaper to import wood from the Baltic by sea than to construct an iron bridge. The decision was influenced by the incorrect belief that the estuary was free from marine borers, which attack and weaken the timber over time. During this era, timber pile viaducts were commonplace on British coastal railways, although the bridge at Barmouth would be longer than most.

Construction began in 1864; the contractor was Thomas Savin, and the ironwork was produced by John Cochrane & Sons. Early on, progress was hindered by strong tidal currents which caused multiple failed attempts to sink the bridge's piers from barges. Between March and June 1866, staging was built from the northern abutment for the bridge, and the piers were dropped into the water, bedded into the rock, and filled with concrete.

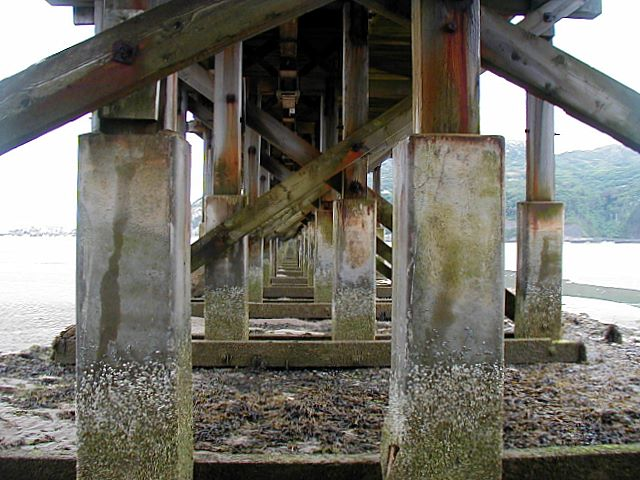
Underside view of the bridge and its piers, showing concrete reinforcement

Wooden trestles were built on screw piles 10 inches (250 mm)-14 inches (360 mm) wide with screw discs 36 inches (910 mm) in diameter in groups of three piles per pier. Timber trellis girders, 40 feet (12 m) long and 4 feet (1.2 m) deep, supported the deck, with driven piles as fenders. The water around the trestles had a maximum depth of 54 feet (16 m) at spring tides but the river bed was raised by tipping stones to protect the piles.

The viaduct had a 47 feet (14 m) wooden drawbridge near its northern end allowing tall ships to pass upstream. The drawbridge span, which was carried on top of wrought iron piles, opened by tilting and rolling back over the track on four 4 feet (1.2 m) wheels, spaced 50 feet (15 m) apart, and nine steel rollers. When opened, there was a 36 feet (11 m) gap between the fenders. The drawbridge was never regularly used as the opening of the railway effectively eliminated the need for traditional boat traffic.

From 3 June 1867, the viaduct was opened for horse-drawn carriages to cross, and on 10 October, the bridge was officially opened, and steam-hauled services started using the track.

=== Operational life ===
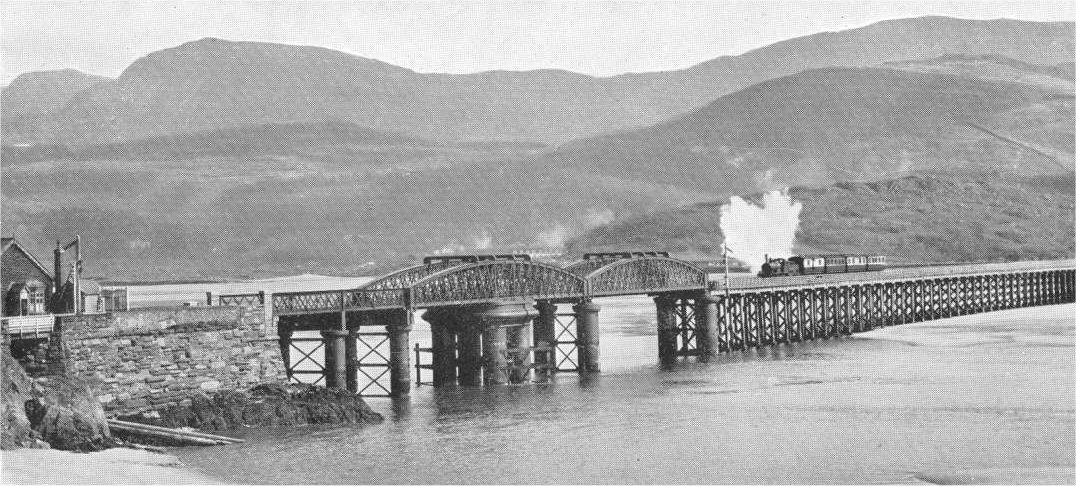
A steam-hauled train traversing Barmouth Bridge, c. 1921

==== 19th century ====
In August 1899, Alfred Jones Collin, the chief engineer of Cambrian Railways (which had absorbed the A&WCR in 1865), ordered underwater inspections to check the integrity of the drawbridge span's ironwork. They discovered that the supports were severely corroded, undermining its structural integrity and requiring the replacement of all the ironwork except for two piers. Repairs started that December and were completed by the end of 1902. The drawbridge was replaced with a swing bridge with a 41.5-metre-long (136 ft) single steel swing span, which rotated around a central pivot, close to a 36-metre-long (118 ft) fixed span. The spans are hogback-shaped lattice trusses, supported by pairs of cylindrical iron piers, and the turntable rests on a cluster of four piers.

==== 20th century ====
In 1906–8, the timber portion of the bridge was completely renewed.

In 1946, the bridge was nearly destroyed after a live naval mine was washed ashore close to it during stormy weather. According to reports, the mine had swept past one of the pillars, but did not detonate and the bridge escaped unscathed.

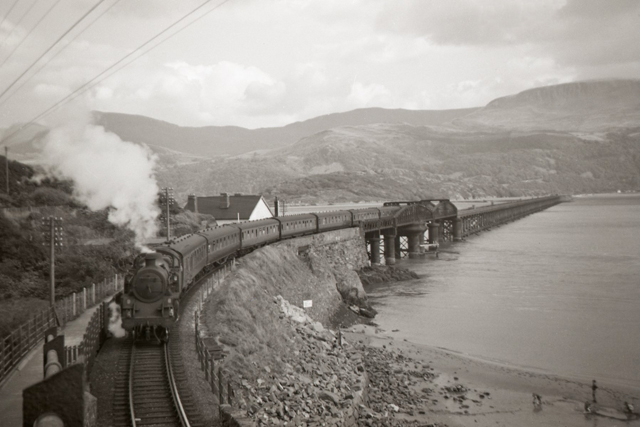
A train approaching Barmouth after crossing the bridge, 1964

Following the Beeching cuts of the 1960s, passenger train services through Barmouth declined after the closure of the Ruabon to Barmouth line via Llangollen and Dolgellau in 1965, causing all traffic to take the longer and slower route from Shrewsbury via Machynlleth and Dovey Junction. The old trackbed from Morfa Mawddach railway station to Dolgellau now forms the Mawddach Trail, a walking and cycle trail.

By 1980, the bridge's 500 timber trestle piles were under attack from marine woodworm at river bed level and the resulting damage was serious enough to threaten its closure. British Rail divers discovered that woodworm had eaten into 69 of the supporting pillars and estimated that it would cost around £2.5 million to repair. On 13 October 1980, the viaduct was temporarily closed to rail traffic, following which locomotive-hauled trains were banned, which resulted in the loss of traffic from Tywyn, including explosives traffic to and from the factory at Penrhyndeudraeth which was re-routed via Maentwrog Road railway station and the Conwy Valley Line. Gwynedd County Council opposed permanently closing the bridge as 40 per cent of all tourism in the area was rail-related. The government applied for a £2.5 million grant from the European Economic Community (EEC) to finance repairs, and £4.6 million was spent on signalling improvements upon the line. In the 1985–1986, the bridge was closed to traffic again for a seven-month period during the repair works, which entailed replacing 48 of the piles with greenheart hardwood. Others were encased and strengthened with grout and glass-reinforced concrete shrouds. Within the trestles, wailing timbers and diagonals were replaced with Douglas fir timber. Rail services resumed when the viaduct reopened in April 1986.

On 13 April 1986, a British Rail Class 37 diesel locomotive number 37427 was named Bont Y Bermo (Welsh for Barmouth Bridge) to celebrate the reintroduction of locomotive-hauled trains following repairs. Locomotive-hauled trains were forbidden shortly afterwards after weight restrictions were imposed upon all bridge traffic.

==== 21st century ====
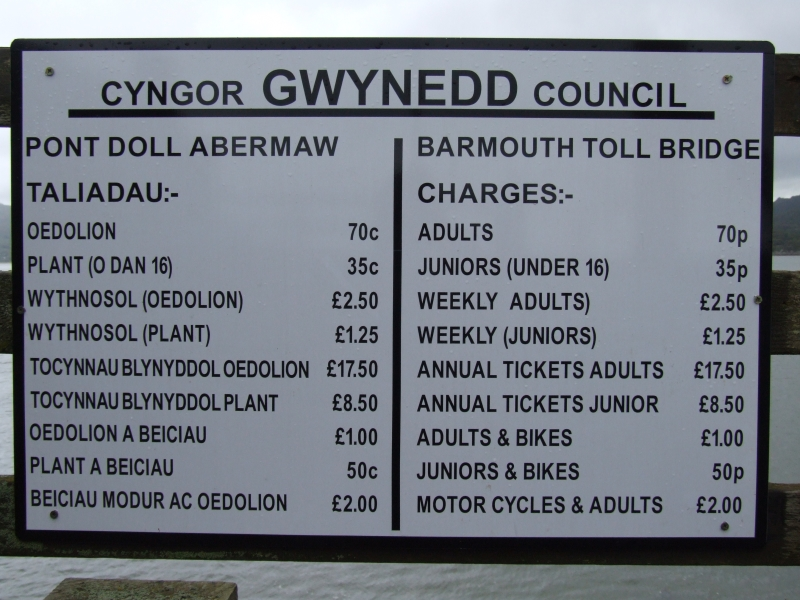
Barmouth Bridge toll prices in 2007, before the toll was removed

In March 2013, the Barmouth Viaduct Access Group (B-VAG), was established to investigate an alternative route from the town centre to the bridge, as the walkway is steep, narrow, and unsuitable for pushchairs or wheelchairs. In June, the bridge toll was removed after the collectors left and were not replaced. The council is undecided as to how to pay for maintenance costs, which were £39,405 for the year. This is problematic as revenue from tolls is insufficient to cover the council's share of costs, and there is no budget to employ staff to collect payments.

Gwynedd Council proposed closing the bridge to pedestrians and cyclists for cost reasons, as it needed to find £9 million of savings by April 2016. Closing the bridge is one of over 100 cost saving options totalling £13 million that were put to a public consultation in autumn 2015. The council pays Network Rail £30,800 per year towards maintenance costs. A petition calling on the council to "cease considerations of closing this much loved walking and cycling route" attracted 20,000 signatures in a week. In February 2016, it was reported that the bridge would not close.

On 4 October 2016, Barmouth Bridge was closed to traffic for a week following a fire on the structure. The following day, Liz Saville Roberts MP called for its speedy renovation as a matter of urgency.

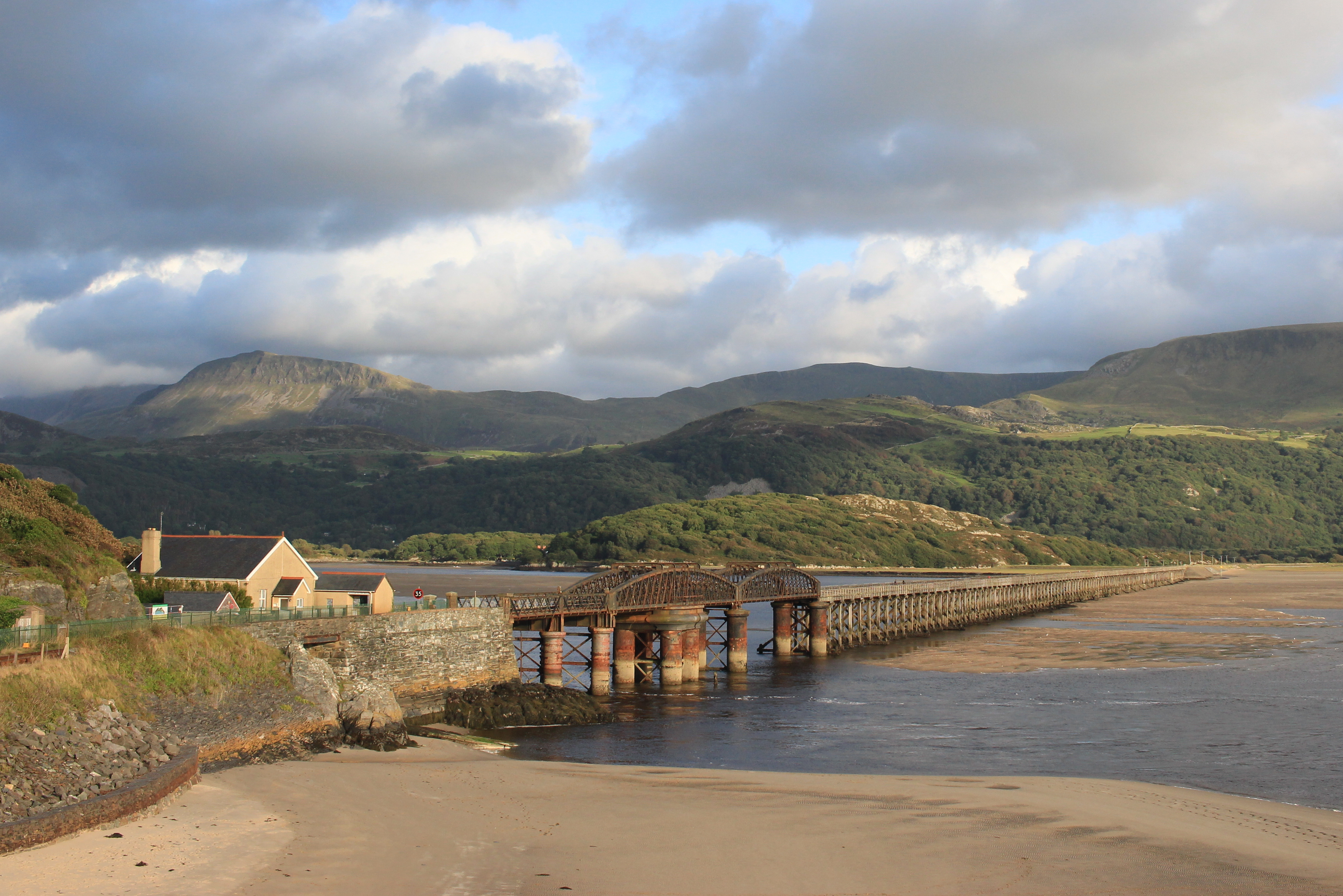
View of the bridge from the northwest in 2019

The viaduct celebrated its 150th anniversary in October 2017 with a fireworks display and special charter trains were run. The same month, Bill Kelly, the chief operating officer of Network Rail Wales, spoke of unapproved ambitions to spend around £20 million to secure the long-term future of Barmouth Bridge between 2019 and 2024. In late 2017, an "honesty toll" of £1 for adults and 50p for children was introduced with a troll mascot, and the old toll house rebranded as a "troll house".

In December 2018, it was reported that the future of the bridge was once again in doubt, but a £25 million 3-year restoration project was announced by Network Rail in May 2020. Network Rail had considered building a new bridge, involving significant groundwork and piling, but chose refurbishment because timber is lighter and the 1867 structure is considered iconic.

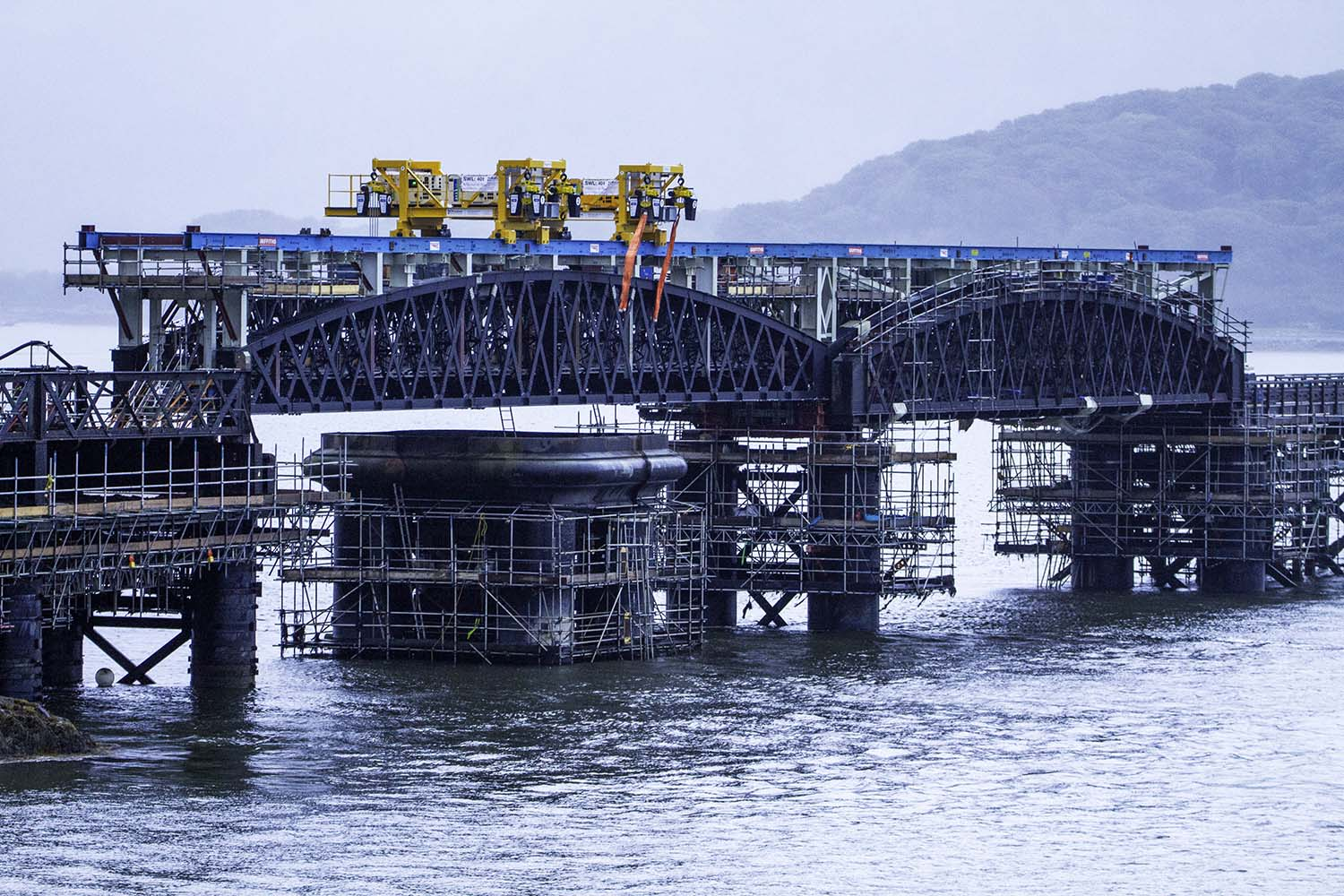
The steel spans were replaced in 2023.

The restoration intended to replace like-for-like a large number of timber elements of the viaduct, the metallic spans of the viaduct, as well as the entire 820 metres (2,690 ft) length of track across it. The swinging elements of the bridge were not to be restored, but all key mechanisms associated with the swing bridge were to be retained in situ in accordance with the 1988 Grade II* listing of the structure. The work was not intended to speed up journeys along the line; the viaduct's long lateral structure gives it limited stability, meaning that maximum speeds of 35 km/h (22 mph) for passenger trains and 15 km/h (9.3 mph) for freight (changed from 20 mph (32 km/h) and 10 mph (16 km/h) respectively upon the introduction of the European Rail Traffic Management System on the line in 2010) will remain. FSC-certified greenheart hardwood was sourced by NR from Guyana for its long track record of use in challenging applications, and preservative treatment is unnecessary as it is resistant to attack by shipworm and wood rotting fungi.

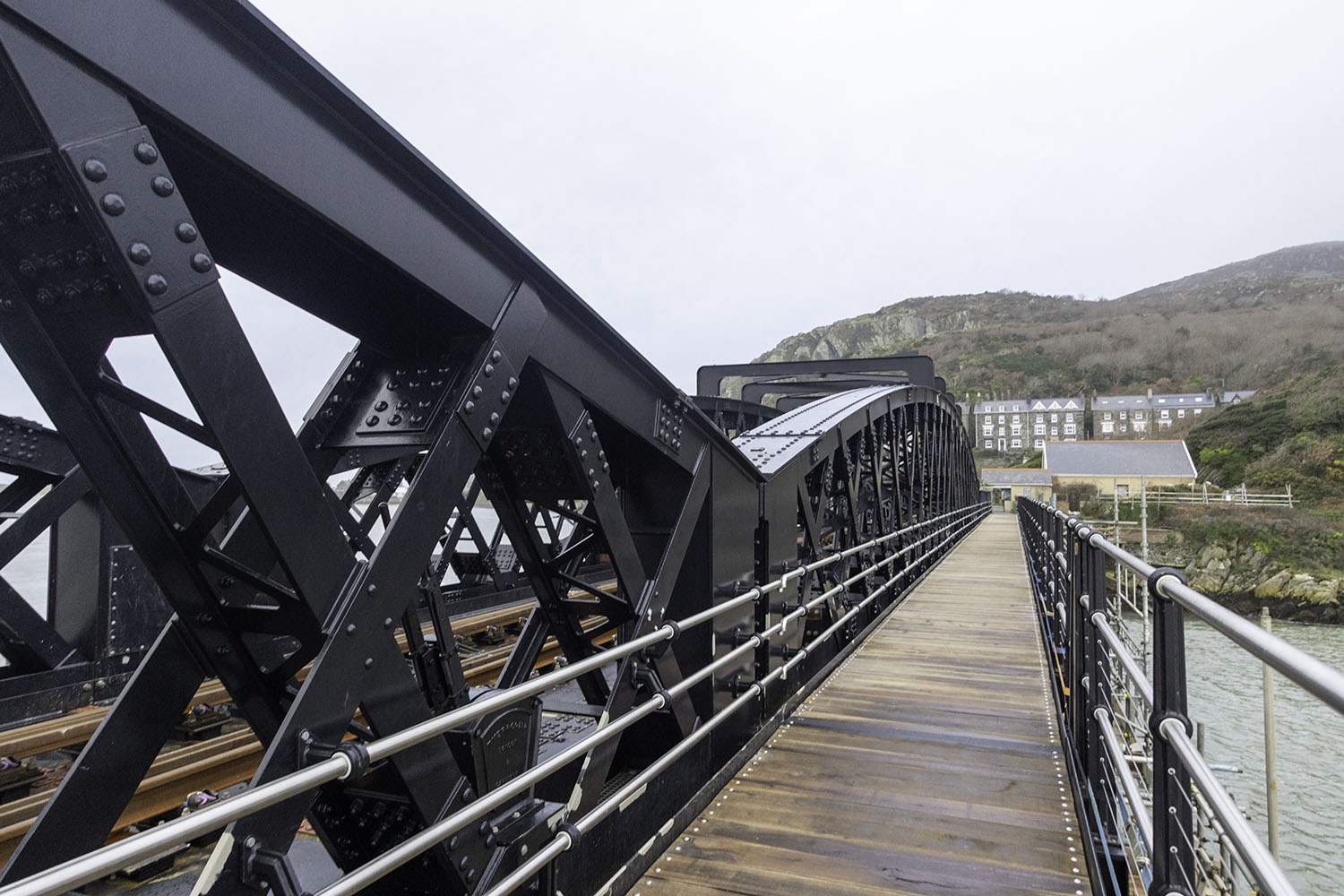
The restored bridge shortly after reopening in December 2023

The first phase of the project was completed in November 2020. The next two of the three planned closures were scheduled for September to December 2021 and October to December 2022. In August 2022, Network Rail announced that the final works would be carried out in two stages, in the autumn of 2022 and in 2023. The work was completed and the track reopened after a three-month closure on 2 December 2023, with a formal opening ceremony on the following Friday attended by Wales Office minister Fay Jones, Senedd member Joyce Watson, the mayor of Barmouth and representatives of Network Rail and their engineering contractors.

== See also ==
- List of bridges in Wales
- Pont Briwet, a former 19th-century timber viaduct built by the Aberystwith and Welsh Coast Railway.
