= Aberystwith and Welsh Coast Railway =

Former railway company west of Wales

Overview
- Locale: Wales
- Continues as: Cambrian Railways

History
- Opened: 1 July 1863
- Closed: 5 August 1866

Technical
- Line length: 86 miles (138 km)
- Track gauge: 4 ft 8 1/2 in (1,435 mm)

The Aberystwith and Welsh Coast Railway was a standard gauge railway company, running a line along the west coast of Wales.

The railway was planned to run between Aberystwyth (Note: Anglicised place name spellings were used during most of the history of the line, and are used here for consistency.) and Pwllheli, and on to Porth Dinllaen, with branches to Dolgelly and Machynlleth. These branches joined the Bala and Dolgelly Railway and Newtown and Machynlleth Railway respectively. There were two major river bridges planned: the Dovey Bridge, across the River Dovey, and the Barmouth Bridge, over the River Mawddach. The former proved impracticable to build, so an altered route was built from Aberdovey to Dovey Junction, near Glandyfi, forming a Y-shaped network. Powers were also obtained in acts of Parliament on multiple occasions for a line from Pwllheli to Porth Dinllaen, though this was never built. The routes were opened progressively between 1863 and 1869.

The company was absorbed into Cambrian Railways in 1865. Continuous shortages of money delayed the completion of the network.

The Dolgelly branch was closed in 1965 as part of the Beeching cuts, and the remainder of the line was under threat of closure in the 1970s. In 1980, serious defects were found in Barmouth Bridge due to a marine worm boring into timber piles, which took several years to fix.

== History ==
=== 19th century ===
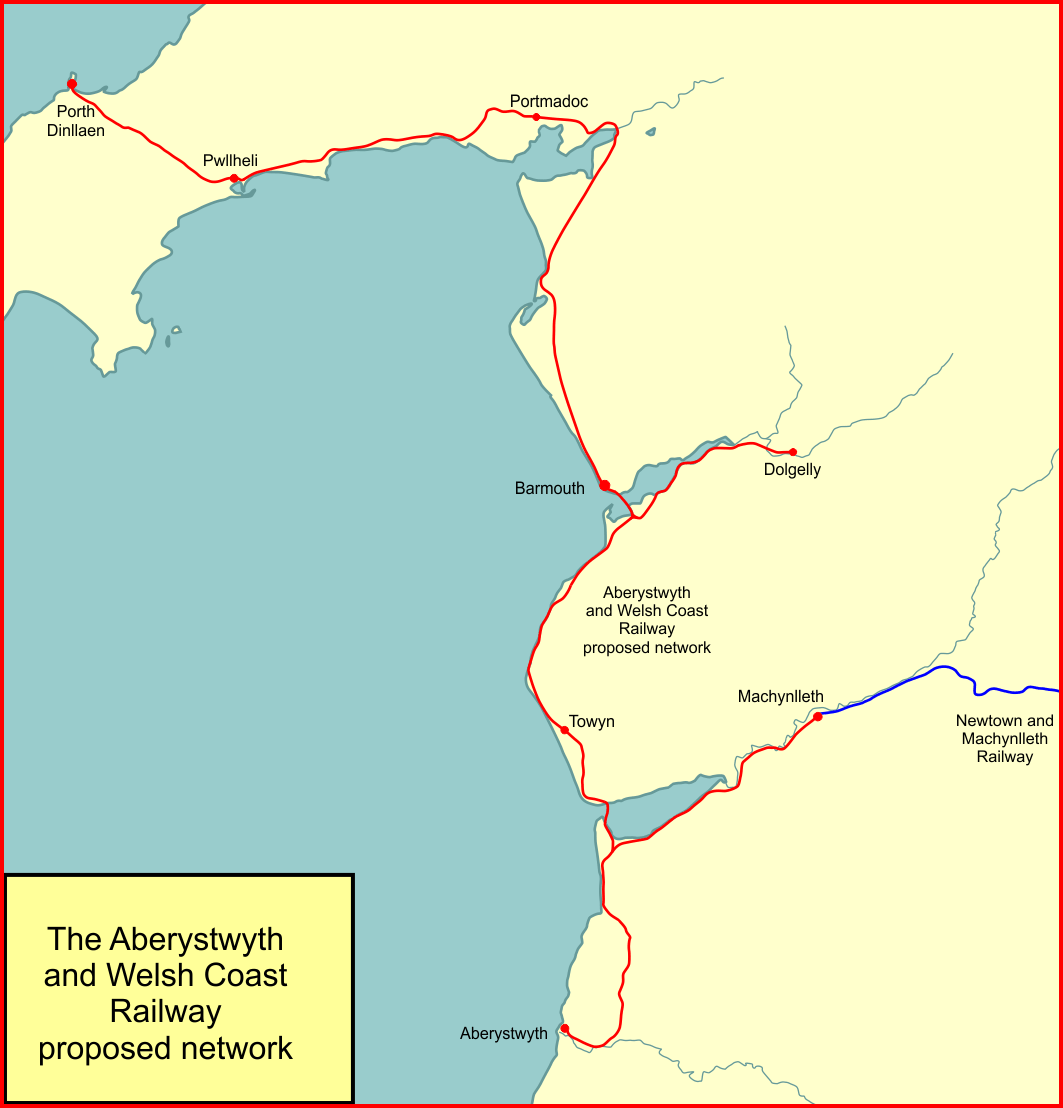
The planned network of the A&WCR

The first main line railway (Note: There were several private mineral lines.) in central Wales, the Llanidloes and Newtown Railway, was opened in 1859. At first it was not connected to any other railway, but it fostered interest in railway development, and soon, through routes to Newtown from both Chester (opened 1861) and from Shrewsbury (opened 1862) were available.

Striking westward and crossing very difficult terrain, the Newtown and Machynlleth Railway was opened on 31 December 1862. (Note: There was a "Grand Opening" afterwards, on 3 January 1863.) Although Machynlleth was an important market town, its promoters were considering an extension to Aberystwyth and the Cardigan Bay coast. Due to a shortage of subscription money from general investors, the Newtown and Machynlleth Railway was in the hands of a successful partnership of railway contractors, David Davies and Thomas Savin, who put up most of the construction money and took paid-up shares as the majority of their payment. These men shared the idea of continuing to the coast, but Savin's ambitious vision of a huge investment in developing the coastal district was considered by Davies to be over-reaching, and the partnership was dissolved on 30 January 1861.

The Newtown and Machynlleth Railway had preliminary designs made for a coastal line, to be known as the Machynlleth, Aberystwyth and Towyn Railway. At about the same time, the Llanidloes and Newtown Railway and the Oswestry and Newtown Railway (the latter still under construction), working together, had a scheme prepared for a coastal line from Aberystwyth to Pwllheli, with several branches. Davies supported the Towyn scheme, while Savin favoured the line to Pwllheli. Moreover, there was no talk of the Pwllheli line continuing to Porth Dinllaen, on the north side of the Lleyn Peninsula. Porth Dinllaen was a natural harbour on the north side of the Lleyn Peninsula, that had been proposed as a packet station for the Irish mail service. At that time, Holyhead had been selected in preference, but Porth Dinllaen still had supporters for development as a ferry port.

Aberystwith and Welsh Coast Railway Act 1861 (Note: Section 1.)
- Act of Parliament
- Parliament of the United Kingdom
- Long title: An Act for making Railways from Aberystwith to various Places in the Counties of Cardigan, Montgomery, Merioneth, and Carnarvon, to be called "The Aberystwith and Welsh Coast Railways," and for other Purposes.
- Citation: 24 & 25 Vict. c clxxi
- Territorial extent: United Kingdom

Dates
- Royal assent: 22 July 1861
- Commencement: 22 July 1861 (Note: The Acts of Parliament (Commencement) Act 1793.)

Status: Current legislation

Both schemes were to be presented to Parliament for the 1861 session, but the Machynlleth, Aberystwyth and Towyn Railway scheme failed to deposit its documentation in time for the parliamentary deadline and was unable to proceed. The Aberystwith and Welsh Coast Railway Bill (in earliest documentation spelt Aberystwith and Welch Coast Railway) alone continued the parliamentary process and was given royal assent on 22 July 1861 as the Aberystwith and Welsh Coast Railway Act 1861 (24 & 25 Vict. c clxxi); the authorised share capital was £400,000 (later increased). The railway was to extend from Aberystwyth to Portmadoc, an important harbour at the time. There was also to be a branch from Ynyslas to Machynlleth to connect to the Newtown and Machynlleth Railway. The main line would bridge the Dovey estuary with a viaduct from Ynyslas to Aberdovey. Seeing a connection to its own line as essential, the Newton and Machynlleth Railway succeeded in getting a clause in the A&WCR Act that, if the A&WCR failed to complete the Machynlleth connection by 1 August 1864, the N&MR might take the powers over.

Aberystwith and Welsh Coast Railway Act 1862
- Act of Parliament
- Parliament of the United Kingdom
- Long title: An Act for authorizing the Aberystwith and Welsh Coast Railway Company to make and maintain additional Lines of Railway, and to reclaim Lands near to their Lines of Railway, and to raise further Monies; and for other Purposes.
- Citation: 25 & 26 Vict. c. clxxvi
- Territorial extent: United Kingdom

Dates
- Royal assent: 29 July 1862
- Commencement: 29 July 1862

Status: Current legislation

Text of statute as originally enacted

The A&WCR took stock and made progress to secure the extension from Portmadoc to Pwllheli and Porth Dinllaen. Railway schemes supported by the Great Western Railway were being planned from Llangollen towards Barmouth, and possibly on from there to north Wales. The A&WCR wanted to head off the threat; to do so it proposed a branch line from near Barmouth to Dolgelly. The A&WCR obtained the second act on 29 July 1862, the Aberystwith and Welsh Coast Railway Act 1862 (25 & 26 Vict. c. clxxvi), which authorised these extensions.

The Bala and Dolgelley Railway, friendly to the GWR, had been authorised on 30 June 1862, so that when built it would complete a GWR-supported route to Dolgelly from Ruabon.

Further north, the Carnarvonshire Railway was incorporated on 29 July 1862 with powers to build from Carnarvon to Portmadoc by way of Afon Wen. The Carnarvonshire Railway authorisation duplicated the A&WCR as between Afon Wen and Portmadoc. The duplication was ignored at first, but the position was finally resolved by an agreement of 13 December 1865 under which the Cambrian Railways (successor to the A&WCR) built the section.

The A&WCR concentrated its construction work on the Machynlleth branch, as it was clear that this offered better hopes of early income, compared with the main line crossing the Dovey estuary. In addition, the deadline set by the clause in the act had to be achieved. The line was opened from Machynlleth as far as Borth on 1 July 1863; it was initially worked by Thomas Savin, the contractor who had built the line. The rest of the Aberystwyth line, from Borth to Aberystwyth, was opened for goods traffic on 23 June 1864; passenger operation had been refused by the Board of Trade inspecting officer, Captain Tyler, but after rectification work, passengers were carried from 1 August 1864.

A part of the northern section of the network, from Aberdovey to Llwyngwril, was the next to be opened, on 24 October 1863. The Aberdovey station was at the harbour, and was initially connected with a ferry from Ynyslas. The line from Llwyngwril to Barmouth Junction, and from there to Penmaenpool on the Dolgelly line, followed on 3 July 1865. There was an intermediate station called Barmouth Ferry, at the place where Fairbourne station was later built. Passengers for Barmouth alighted there and walked on across the sandbar to catch a ferry over the Mawddach estuary to Barmouth Harbour.

Aberystwith and Welsh Coast Railway Act 1863
- Act of Parliament
- Parliament of the United Kingdom
- Long title: An Act for authorizing the Aberystwith and Welsh Coast Railway Company to make and maintain further Lines of Railway and other Works, and to make Arrangements with other Companies, and to raise further Monies; and for other Purposes.
- Citation: 26 & 27 Vict. c. cxli
- Territorial extent: United Kingdom

Dates
- Royal assent: 13 July 1863
- Commencement: 13 July 1863

Status: Current legislation

Text of statute as originally enacted

The third bill promoted by the company was passed as the Aberystwith and Welsh Coast Railway Act 1863 (26 & 27 Vict. c. cxli), on 13 July. It authorised the construction of an Aberystwyth Harbour branch as well as alteration of the Dovey viaduct and of the Mawddach bridge, to add a vehicular road as well as the railway. The south-western extremity of the Corris Railway was duplicated by the A&WCR line and was no longer useful; the Corris Railway was authorised to abandon its line west of Machynlleth, by the Corris Railway Act 1864 (27 & 28 Vict. c. ccxxv) of 25 July. (The Aberystwyth Harbour branch was not constructed because the Cambrian Railways as successor to the A&WCR wished such traffic to go to Aberdovey.)

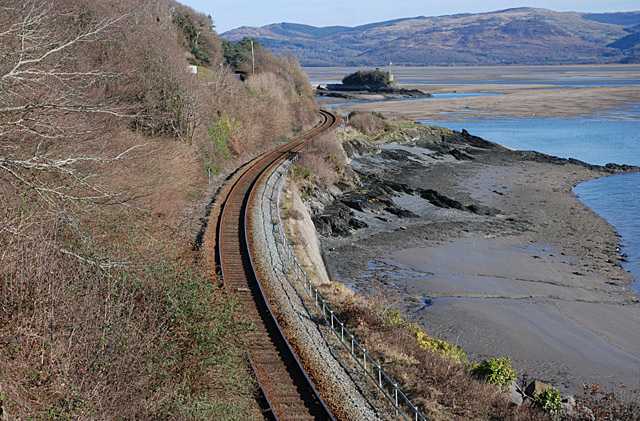
The railway follows the north shore of the Afon Dyfi

Aberystwith and Welsh Coast Railway (General) Act 1864
- Act of Parliament
- Parliament of the United Kingdom
- Long title: An Act for authorizing the Aberystwith and Welsh Coast Railway Company to acquire additional Lands, and to raise further Monies; and for authorizing the Oswestry and Newtown Railway Company to contribute further Monies towards the Funds of that Company; and for other Purposes.
- Citation: 27 & 28 Vict. c. cxlvii
- Territorial extent: United Kingdom

Dates
- Royal assent: 30 June 1864
- Commencement: 30 June 1864

Status: Current legislation

Text of statute as originally enacted

Aberystwith and Welsh Coast Railway (General) Act 1865
- Act of Parliament
- Parliament of the United Kingdom
- Long title: An Act to enable the Aberystwith and Welsh Coast Railway Company to deviate from some of its authorized Lines; to make certain Extensions at Portmadoc Harbour, Aberdovey, and Cerig-y-Penrhyn; and for other Purposes.
- Citation: 28 & 29 Vict. c. cclxxxiii
- Territorial extent: United Kingdom

Dates
- Royal assent: 5 July 1865
- Commencement: 5 July 1865

Status: Current legislation

Text of statute as originally enacted

The A&WCR's engineer, Benjamin Piercy, was dismissed early in 1864 as part of a power struggle between Thomas Savin and other factions on the board. He had been progressing the design of the Dovey bridge, but practical and financial difficulties with it had been emerging. In particular, finding a good foundation stratum was proving extremely difficult. Piercy's expulsion gave an opportunity to revisit the plan to bridge the estuary, and in May 1864 the decision was taken to abandon the bridging plan. In October 1864 preparations were undertaken for a parliamentary bill to authorise the abandonment, and to substitute an extension from Aberdovey to a junction with the Aberystwyth line near Morben. The line became known as the "deviation line" and the junction location was later called Dovey Junction. The bill was given royal assent on 5 July as the Aberystwith and Welsh Coast Railway (General) Act 1865 (28 & 29 Vict. c. cclxxxiii). The act stipulated that the fares and goods rates for consignment between Aberdovey and Borth via Morben were to be the same as if the bridge were built and in operation. The GWR had planned to achieve direct access from Dolgelly to Aberystwyth by way of the bridge, and it obtained the insertion of a clause empowering it to build the bridge itself within ten years, though it never attempted to do so.

The course of the connecting line at Aberdovey was difficult, and a proposed waterside route through the town proved unacceptable. An alternative path around the back of the town was developed, but it was operationally difficult, with steep gradients and sharp curves, as well as three tunnels. In addition, the Aberdovey Harbour station would be bypassed, there was no space for a new station on the deviation line, and the new Aberdovey station was inconveniently located some way west of the town.

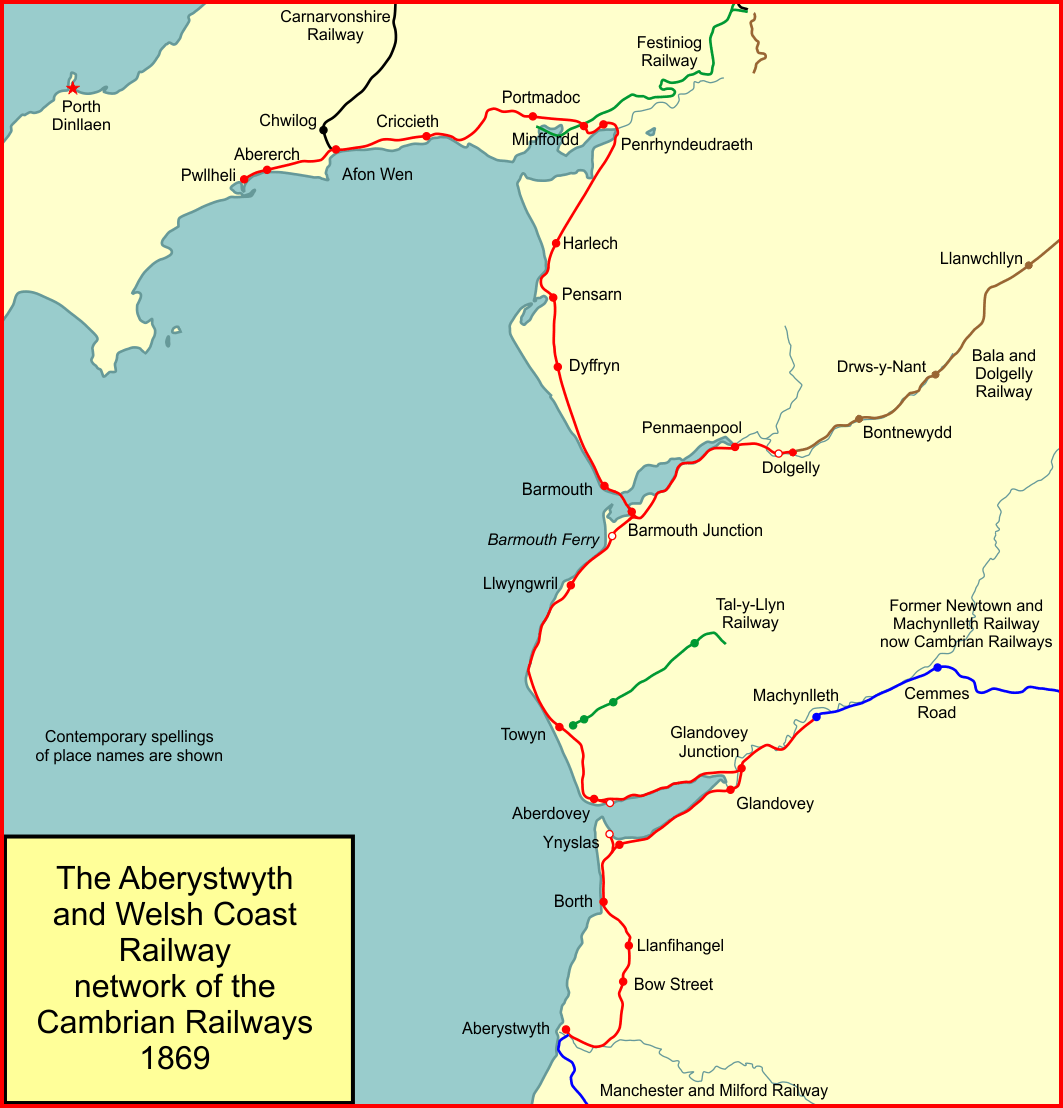
The A&WCR network in 1869 (under the Cambrian Railways)

The group of Newtown railways were now discussing amalgamation: the several small railways would be stronger if they joined forces. The A&WCR was included in the talks, but there was a standard condition imposed by Parliament in considering amalgamations, that the companies concerned must have spent at least half of their authorised capital, and that at least half of their authorised network must have been built. The A&WCR was not yet in that position, and had to be excluded from the amalgamation bill. The other companies were authorised to amalgamate, forming the Cambrian Railways, by the Cambrian Railways Act 1864 (27 & 28 Vict. c. cclxii) of 25 July. Henceforward the A&WCR was included in strategic discussions and plans with the Cambrian Railways.

Cambrian and Coast Railways (Amalgamation) Act 1865 (Note: Section 19.)
- Act of Parliament
- Parliament of the United Kingdom
- Long title: An Act to authorize the vesting of the Aberystwith and Welsh Coast Railway in the Cambrian Railways Company by Amalgamation.
- Citation: 28 & 29 Vict. c. ccxci
- Territorial extent: United Kingdom

Dates
- Royal assent: 5 July 1865
- Commencement: 5 July 1865

Status: Current legislation

Text of statute as originally enacted

A year later, the criterion for amalgamation was achieved, and the A&WCR was incorporated in the Cambrian Railways by the passing of the Cambrian and Coast Railways (Amalgamation) Act 1865 (28 & 29 Vict. c. ccxci) on 5 July: the merger took effect on 5 August 1865.

The Manchester and Milford Railway built a line from Pencader to Aberystwyth, opening there in August 1867, with platforms on the south-west side.

The contractor Thomas Savin was undertaking all the remaining construction work for the A&WCR section of the Cambrian Railways, as well as working the traffic. He had accepted company shares as the major part of the payment for his construction work, and he was directly financing company outlays from his own resources. By 5 February 1866 he was effectively bankrupt, putting the Cambrian Railways into difficulty. On 10 May 1866, the financial house of Overend, Gurney and Company failed, plunging money markets throughout the United Kingdom into turmoil and making railway investments hazardous for the public. Many investors were unwilling or unable to respond to calls on shareholdings, and borrowing became very difficult.

For some years the company was in serious financial difficulty, and at length mortgage holders sued in the Court of Chancery. The company's Deputy Chairman, Captain R. D. Pryce, was appointed as receiver; the actions were stayed after two months, at the end of 1867. In fact, the company as a whole was in serious financial difficulty, with huge obligations and almost no profitable business activity. The Cambrian Railways Finance Act 1868 (31 & 32 Vict. c. clxxvii), was passed on 31 July 1868 and authorised a financial reconstruction, as well as preventing for a period the activation of claims against the company; this averted an immediate disaster but did not abate the problem.

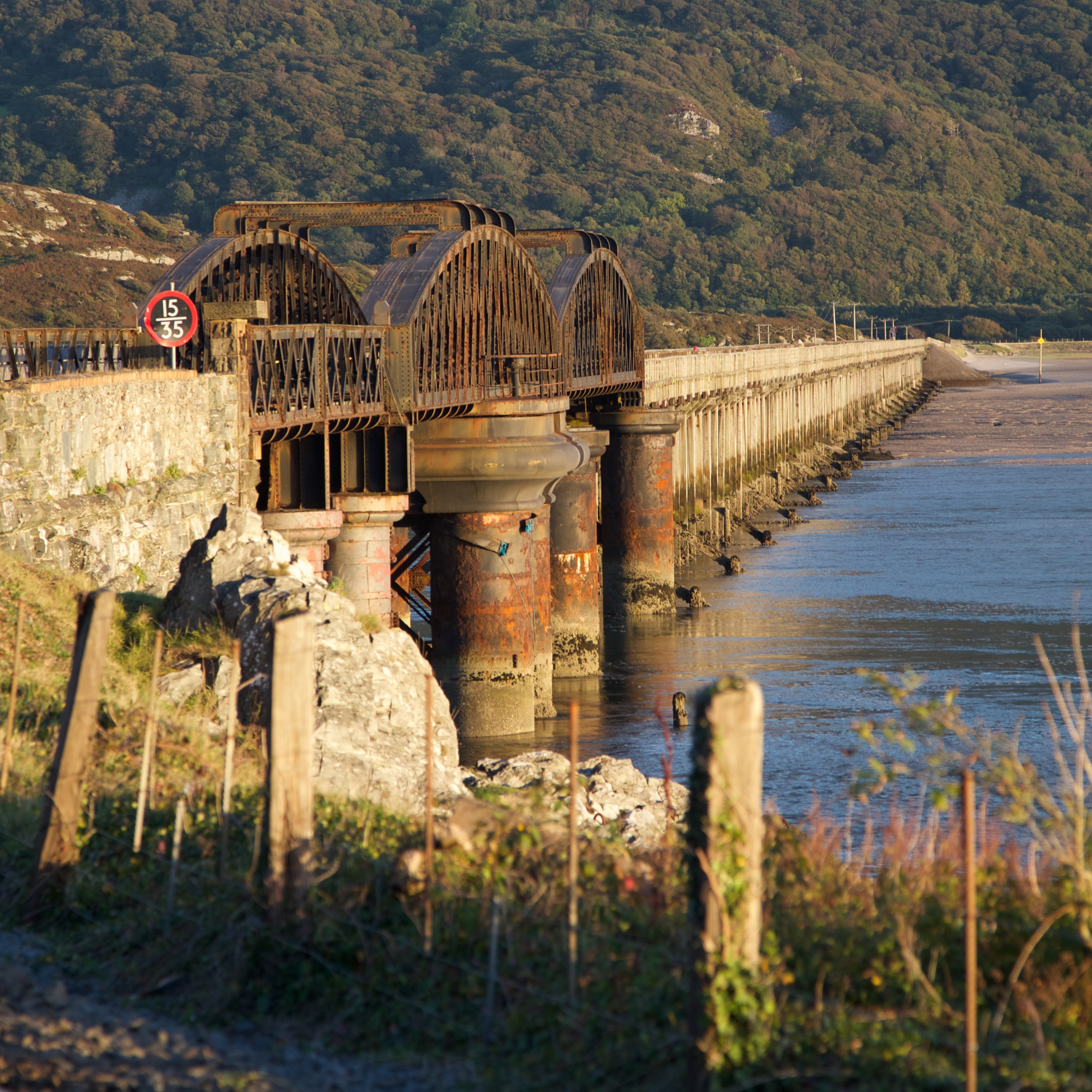
Barmouth railway bridge

Barmouth Bridge was first tested in July 1866 by a steam engine, though service did not start until 3 June 1867, and then only of horse-drawn carriages. Steam trains did not use it regularly until the opening of the entire coast line four months later, when on 10 October 1867 the line was opened through to Pwllheli. The 113-span viaduct, constructed on over 500 timber piles, was driven into a stand, with a drawbridge at the northern end. Meanwhile, on 14 August 1867, the "deviation" line from Dovey Junction to Aberdovey was opened.

Porthdinlleyn Railway Act 1884
- Act of Parliament
- Parliament of the United Kingdom
- Long title: An Act to authorise the construction of a Railway from Pwllheli to Porthdinlleyn in the county of Carnarvon; and for other purposes.
- Citation: 47 & 48 Vict. c. ccxlviii
- Territorial extent: United Kingdom

Dates
- Royal assent: 7 August 1884
- Commencement: 7 August 1884
- Repealed: 20 June 1892
Other legislation
Repealed by	Porthdinlleyn Railway (Abandonment) Act 1892

Status: Repealed

Text of statute as originally enacted

Porthdinlleyn Railway Act 1888
- Act of Parliament
- Parliament of the United Kingdom
- Long title: An Act to revive and extend the powers of the Porthdinlleyn Railway Company for the acquisition of lands for and the completion of their authorised Railway and for other purposes.
- Citation: 51 & 52 Vict. c. liv
- Territorial extent: United Kingdom

Dates
- Royal assent: 28 June 1888
- Commencement: 28 June 1888
- Repealed: 20 June 1892
Other legislation
Repealed by	Porthdinlleyn Railway (Abandonment) Act 1892

Status: Repealed

Text of statute as originally enacted

Porthdinlleyn Railway Act 1890
- Act of Parliament
- Parliament of the United Kingdom
- Long title: An Act to extend the Powers of the Porthdinlleyn Railway Company for the acquisition of Lands for and the completion of their authorised Railway and for other purposes.
- Citation: 53 & 54 Vict. c. cxiii
- Territorial extent: United Kingdom

Dates
- Royal assent: 25 July 1890
- Commencement: 25 July 1890
- Repealed: 20 June 1892
Other legislation
Repealed by	Porthdinlleyn Railway (Abandonment) Act 1892

Status: Repealed

Porthdinlleyn Railway (Abandonment) Act 1892
- Act of Parliament
- Parliament of the United Kingdom
- Long title: An Act for the abandonment of the Porthdinlleyn Railway.
- Citation: 55 & 56 Vict. c. xcvi
- Territorial extent: United Kingdom

Dates
- Royal assent: 20 June 1892
- Commencement: 20 June 1892
- Repealed: 31 January 2013
Other legislation
Repeals/revokes	Porthdinlleyn Railway Act 1884; Porthdinlleyn Railway Act 1888; Porthdinlleyn Railway Act 1890
Repealed by	Statute Law (Repeals) Act 2013

Status: Repealed

Text of statute as originally enacted

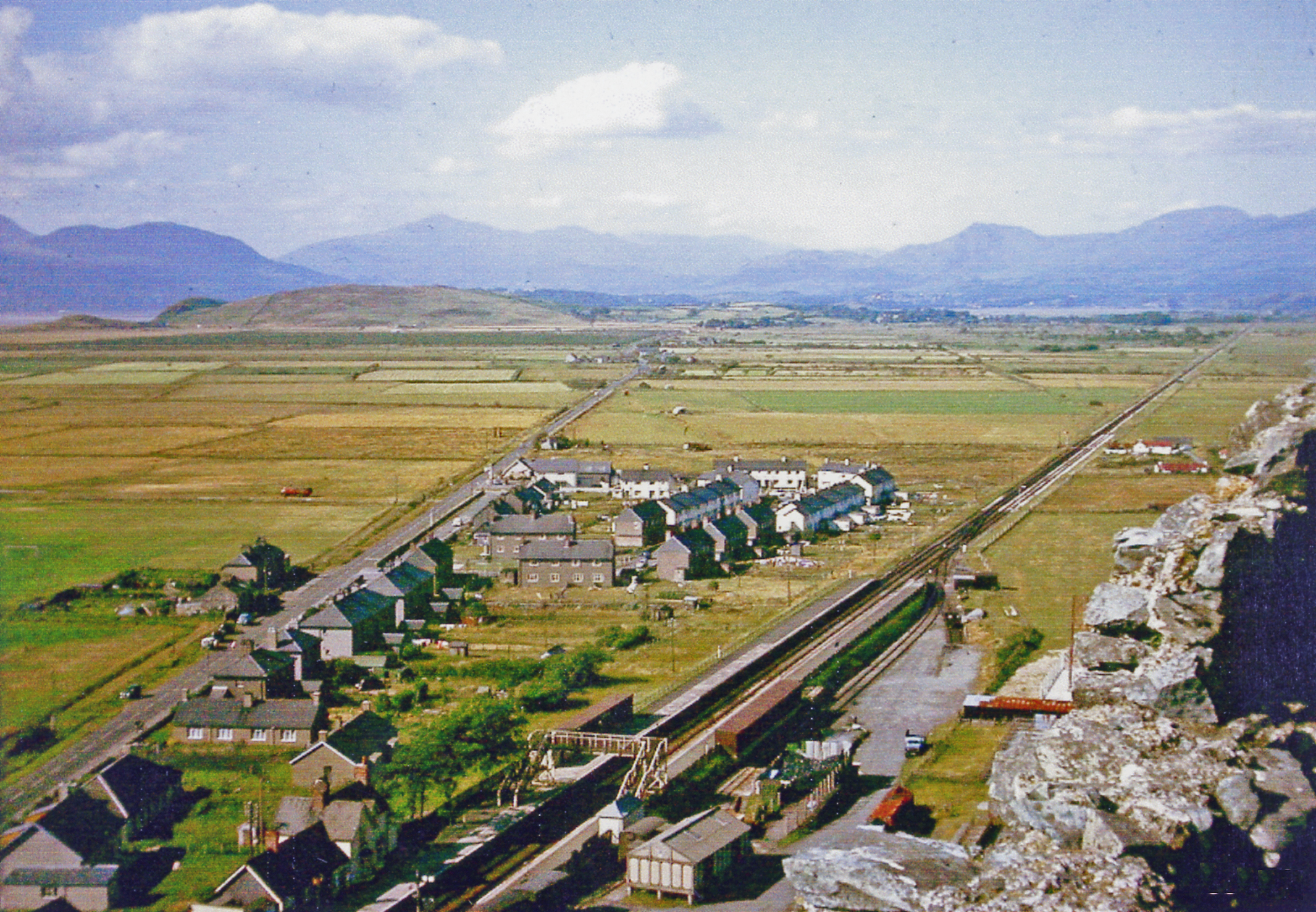
Harlech Station and Morfa Harlech

Porth Dinllaen had once been promoted as the mail packet terminal for Dublin, but lost out in favour of Holyhead. The A&WCR still yearned to develop it, and obtained powers to do so in the 1862 act. When the line reached Pwllheli the vision waned, and continuing across the Lleyn peninsula was not attempted. The Cambrian Railways unsuccessfully sought to revive these powers in 1876. Undeterred, the Porthdinlleyn Railway Company was incorporated in 1884 by the Porthdinlleyn Railway Act 1884 (47 & 48 Vict. c. ccxlviii) for a line from Pwllheli but abandoned it in 1892 by the Porthdinlleyn Railway (Abandonment) Act 1892 (55 & 56 Vict. c. xcvi). In 1913 the company obtained powers for a rail extension to Porth Dinllaen, but World War I intervened and the idea subsequently lapsed.

In 1899, Barmouth viaduct was re-built, described by C. P. Gasquoine as:

In 1899, the ironwork portion of [Barmouth] viaduct had become too weak for the constantly increasing loads of developing traffic, [so] it was completely renewed with a modern steel structure of four spans, one of which was a swing span, revolving on the centre pier and giving two clear openings. The piers carrying the girders are formed of columns 8ft. in diameter sunk through the sand down to the solid rock, which was reached at a depth of about 90 feet below the high water mark... In 1906, and the following two or three years, the timber portion of the viaduct was also completely renewed in the same material.

The original Pwllheli station was on Abererch Road, short of the inner harbour and the River Erch. In the mid-nineteenth century, the harbour was busy with coal and agricultural products, but the railway dominated those traffics; reduced conservancy resulted in silting of the inner harbour by material brought in by the River Erch. In 1903, improvement works were carried out to the inner harbour, and reclamation work was carried out; an embankment was constructed by Pwllheli Corporation. As the railway station was distant from the town centre, the opportunity was taken to extend the line westwards to its present position at the Cob, as authorised by the Cambrian Railways Act 1901 (1 Edw. 7. c. lxix) of 2 July. The extension and the new two-platform terminus were opened on 19 July 1909.

=== 20th century ===
After World War I, the Railways Act 1921 transferred most mainline railways into one of four companies, in a process referred to as the "grouping". The Cambrian Railways became a constituent of a new Great Western Railway, of which the old GWR was the largest component. The transfer took effect on 1 January 1922, from which date the Cambrian Railways ceased to exist. (Note: Except for the winding up of financial affairs.)

The layout at Aberystwyth was improved in 1925, with longer platforms taking up the land formerly used by a turntable. A triangle for locomotive turning was installed, using one of the Manchester and Milford sidings, though through running to Carmarthen via the triangle was not possible. A new station frontage and a big increase in the area roofed over were the improvements most appreciated by passengers.

Aberdovey station, opened at the same time as the "deviation" line to Dovey Junction, was a great distance west of the town, causing complaints lasting for decades. In 1933, Penhelig Halt was opened, at the east end of the town but considerably more convenient.

The last of a series of coast halts was opened at Llandecwyn in 1935. At Abererch, a conditional halt with double-arm platform signals for passengers to stop trains became a full station.

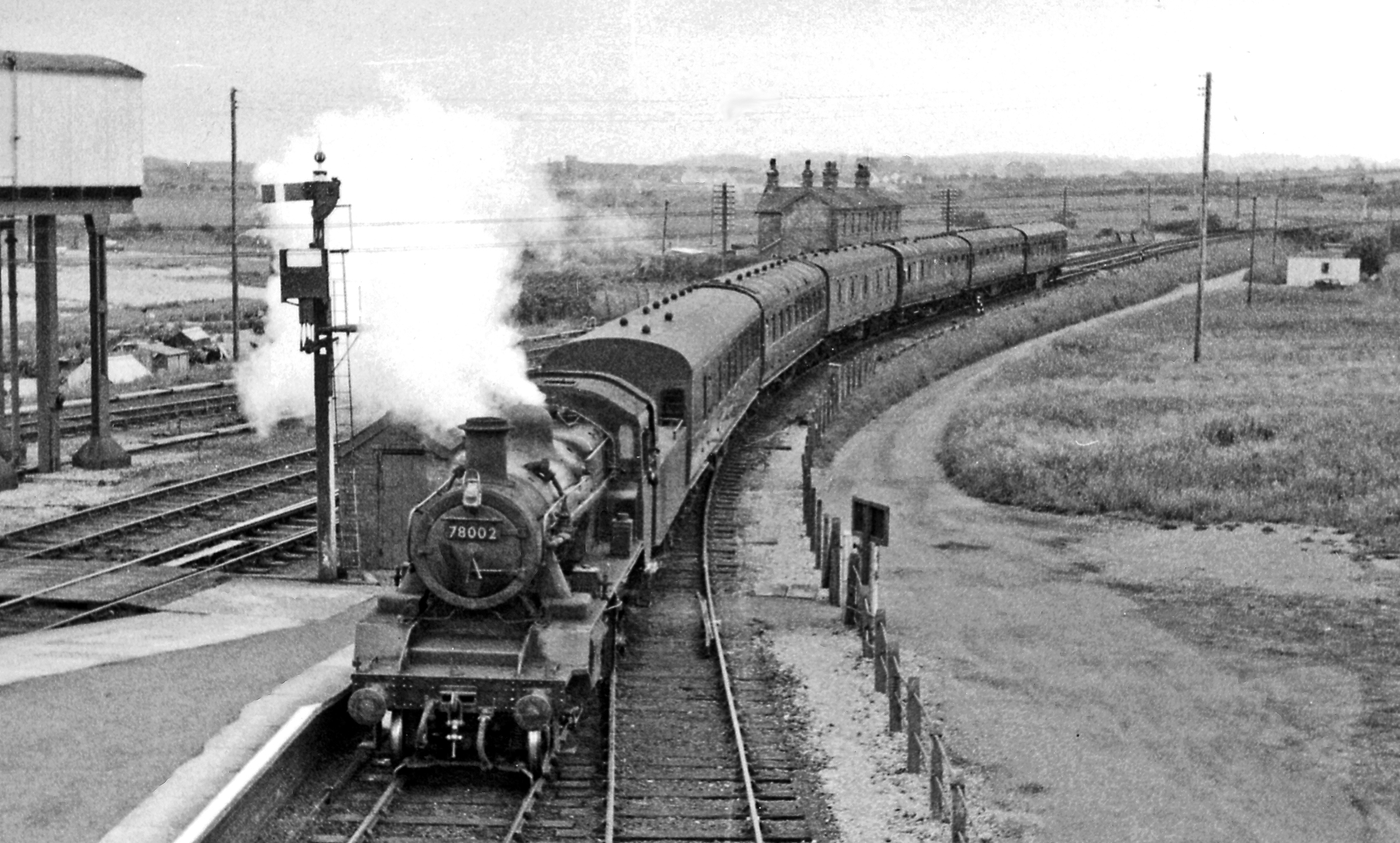
Pwllheli to Bangor train at Afon Wen in 1962

Penychain Halt was opened on 31 July 1933, initially with only a simple short platform. On the seaward side, Butlins built a large holiday camp, but on completion in 1939 the camp was taken over by the Royal Navy as "HMS Glendower". After the War, further work was needed and the holiday camp did not open until the 1947 season. The halt station was enlarged and a wooden second platform built, with brick waiting rooms; the old halt platform was refurbished. The line was doubled to Afon Wen (commissioned on 3 April 1947), since most of the Butlins traffic would be coming via Bangor and the London, Midland and Scottish Railway (successor to the Carnarvonshire Railway). The layout at Afon Wen was enhanced at this time, as the holiday trains reversed there; the running lines at Penychain were reversible. By the 1970s, the use of the station had declined as most holidaymakers came by road.

The railways were nationalised in 1948, becoming British Railways.

In the 1960s, the former A&WCR network was under consideration for closure or significant reduction, as goods traffic declined steeply and passenger business transferred to road transport. The threat of total closure was eventually averted, but the collapse of wagonload traffic, in particular, rendered most local goods facilities unnecessary. The national strike in the coal mining industry in 1983 also hastened a transfer away from traditional goods traffic.

After a partial closure from 13 to 17 December 1964 due to floods east of Dolgellau, the Barmouth to Dolgelly section reopened but finally closed on 18 January 1965.

A proposal to close the entire coast line in 1971 was fought successfully by a pressure group. The Radio Electronic Token Block signalling system was installed over the weekend of 1 and 2 October 1988.

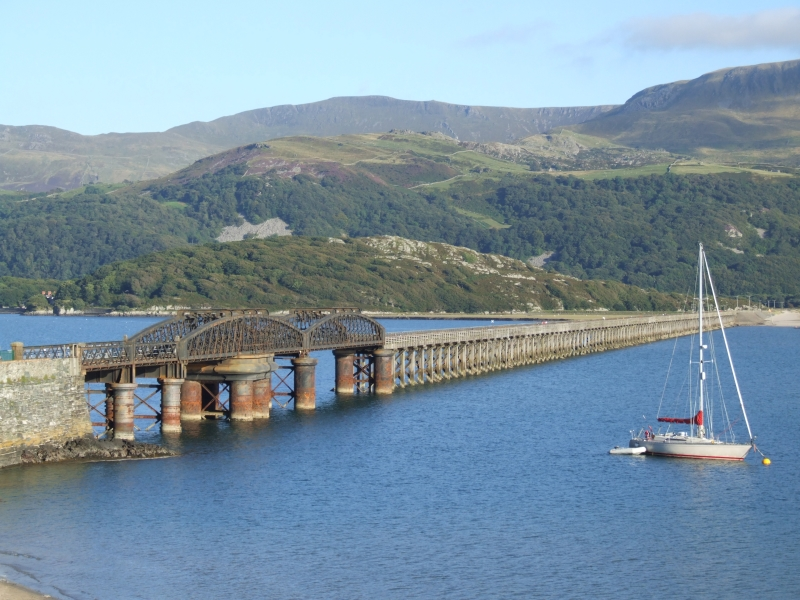
Barmouth Bridge across the River Mawddach estuary near Barmouth, in 2007

On 13 October 1980, Barmouth bridge was closed to rail traffic when it was discovered that about three-quarters of the 500 timber trestle piles had been damaged at river bed level by shipworm. Extensive repairs were undertaken in the mid-1980s, including replacing 48 of the piles with greenheart hardwood and strengthening 330 more piles with cementitious resin grout and glass-reinforced concrete jackets. Rail services resumed when the viaduct re-opened in April 1986.

== Morfa Mawddach triangle ==
There was a triangular layout at Morfa Mawddach where the Dolgelly line diverged from the main line to Pwllheli. The south curve was opened first, on 3 July 1865 as part of the direct route from Aberdovey to Dolgelly. The west and north curves were opened in 1867 as part of the main line to Barmouth, and at that time a station was then opened at the apex nearest Barmouth; it was named Barmouth Junction until 1960 when it was renamed Morfa Mawddach.

No platform was ever built on the south curve; it was singled around 1900 and then used as a siding. The station originally had three platforms, two on the main line and one on the branch, but about 1890 a down platform on the Dolgellau line was added. There was also a bay platform at the end of the up Dolgellau platform, used from 1934 for camping coaches. As the Barmouth turntable would not take all types of engines working through from Dolgellau (which was less restricted than the main line) the triangle was sometimes used for turning engines.

== Dolgelly ==
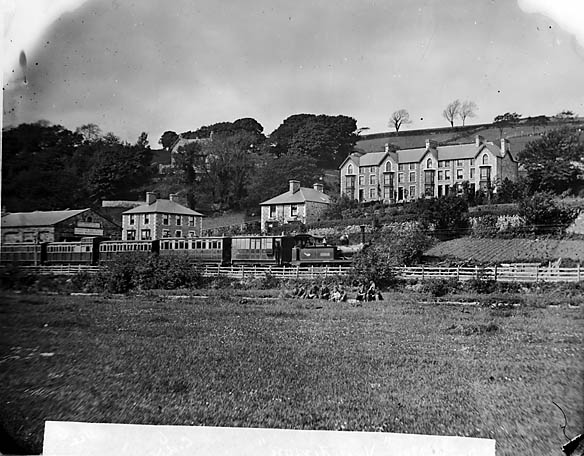
Early train at the first A&WCR Dolgelly station

The A&WCR's Dolgelly branch had been authorised in 1862, and in the same session the Bala and Dolgelly Railway, in effect the Great Western Railway, was also approved. At the time no direction was given as to the lines connecting, but this was rectified in an Act of 21 July 1863, which mandated a joint station. The A&WCR had reached Penmaenpool, two miles short, on 3 July 1865, and no progress was made for some time. The GWR line opened on 4 August 1868.

On 11 June 1869, the Board of Trade Inspector passed the Cambrian extension from Penmaenpool to Dolgelly. Due to a delay in getting possession of land, the Cambrian Railways had to erect a temporary station at a point known as Frondirion (about half a mile west of the Great Western station), opening on 21 June 1869. The extension to Dolgelly GWR station was opened on 1 August 1869. There were two separate stations here until 1872. Mitchell and Smith show a fragment of a 1911 Ordnance Survey map; Dolgellau station has the appearance of a single station on a double track section of the line, but the legend shows "Station (Great Western)" for the buildings on the northern platform, and "Station (Cambrian)" for the southern. Plate 92 shows the station and the caption states, "The canopy styles reflect the earlier different ownerships".

== Accidents ==
The cliff top line at Friog was the site of two almost identical accidents, in 1883 and 1933, in which the locomotive plunged to the foot of the cliff, leaving the bulk of the train remaining on the track. The locomotive crews were killed in both instances. The topography at this point is demanding, as the existing coast road at a higher level had to be accommodated, as well as a working mine.

== Current operations ==
The majority of the line is open, except for the section between Morfa Mawddach and Dolgellau, which closed on 18 January 1965, and the Aberdovey Harbour and Ynyslas wharf branches.

The ten-mile (16 km) section of the Dolgellau branch, alongside the southern shore of the Mawddach estuary, is now the Llwybr Mawddach (or "Mawddach Trail"), a cycle route and bridleway. This section of the line featured in the BBC's Railway Walks series with Julia Bradbury.

== Station list ==
Stations in bold are still open.

=== Machynlleth-Aberystwith ===
- Aberystwith; opened 23 June 1864; spelt **Aberystwyth** in Bradshaw after 1867; still open;
- Bow Street; opened 23 June 1864; closed 14 June 1965; new station opened 14 February 2021;
- Llanfihangel; opened 23 June 1864; renamed Llandre 1 August 1916; closed 14 June 1965;
- **Borth**; opened 1 July 1863; still open;
- Ynyslas; opened 1 July 1863; closed 14 June 1965;
  - Ynyslas Wharf; used 1863 to 1867;
- Glandovey; opened 1 July 1863; renamed Glandyfi 1 July 1904; closed 14 June 1965;
- Glandovey Junction; opened 14 August 1867; renamed **Dovey Junction** 1 July 1904; still open;
- **Machynlleth**; Newtown and Machynlleth Railway station; still open.

=== Glandovey Junction-Pwllheli ===
- **Pwllheli**; opened 20 September 1867; still open;
- **Abererch**; opened July 1884; still open;
- **Penychain**; opened 31 July 1933; still open;
- Afon Wen; opened 20 September 1867; closed 7 December 1964;
- **Criccieth**; opened 20 September 1867; still open;
- Black Rock Halt; opened 9 July 1923; closed 13 August 1976;
- Portmadoc; opened 20 September 1867; renamed **Porthmadog** 5 May 1975; still open;
- **Minffordd**; opened 1 August 1872; still open;
- **Penrhyndeudraeth**; opened 20 September 1867; still open;
- **Llandecwyn**; opened 18 November 1935; still open;
- **Talsarnau**; opened 10 October 1867; still open;
- **Tygwyn**; opened 11 July 1927; still open;
- **Harlech**; opened 10 October 1867; still open;
- **Llandanwg**; opened 18 November 1929; still open;
- Pensarn; opened 10 October 1867; renamed Llanbedr & Pensarn 1 April 1885; renamed **Pensarn** 8 May 1978; still open;
- Talwrn Bach; opened 9 July 1923; renamed **Llanbedr** 8 May 1978; still open;
- Dyffryn; opened 10 October 1867; renamed Dyffryn-on-Sea 1 July 1924; renamed **Dyffryn Ardudwy** 1 June 1948; still open;
- **Talybont**; opened July 1912; still open;
- **Llanaber**; opened 14 August 1911; still open;
- **Barmouth**; opened 5 June 1867; still open;
- Barmouth Junction; opened 3 July 1865; renamed **Morfa Mawddach** 13 June 1960; still open;
- Barmouth Ferry; opened 3 July 1865; closed 3 June 1867; re-opened 6 June 1899 as **Fairbourne**; still open;
- **Llwyngwril**; opened 24 October 1863; still open;
- Llangelynin; opened 7 July 1930; closed 26 October 1991;
- **Tonfanau**; opened July 1896; closed September 1896; reopened July 1903; still open;
- Towyn; opened 24 October 1863; renamed **Tywyn** 5 May 1975; still open;
- **Aberdovey**; opened 14 August 1867; still open;
  - Aberdovey; first station at Harbour opened 24 October 1863; closed 14 August 1867;
- **Penhelig** opened 8 May 1933; still open;
- Abertafol Halt; opened 18 March 1935; closed 14 May 1984;
- Gogarth; opened 9 July 1923; closed 14 May 1984;
- Glandovey Junction; above.

=== Dolgelly to Barmouth Junction ===
- Dolgelly; first station: temporary terminus on the west side of Bridge Street bridge opened 3 July 1865; closed 1 August 1869 when the short gap to join the GWR line was ready 21 June 1869; GWR station used subsequently; closed 18 January 1965;
- Penmaenpool; opened 3 July 1865; closed 18 January 1965;
- Arthog; opened 28 March 1870; closed to goods 4 May 1964; closed to passengers 18 January 1965;
- Barmouth Junction; above.

== Connecting lines ==
Several other railways had connections with the A&WCR network. These were:

=== Machynlleth to Aberystwith ===
- Newtown and Machynlleth Railway at Machynlleth; opened 31 December 1962 * 29 July 1862 (pre-existent); amalgamated with Oswestry and Newtown Railway 31 August 1863 absorbed into Cambrian Railways 25 July 1864; now part of Cambrian Line route; still open;
- Corris Railway at Machynlleth; opened April 1859 (pre-existent); bought by the Great Western Railway late 1929; closed 20 August 1948; partly reopened to passenger traffic 2002; currently being restored;
- Plynlimon and Hafan Tramway at Llanfihangel; opened to goods 19 August 1897; opened to passengers 28 March 1898; closed 19 December 1899;
- Vale of Rheidol Railway at Aberystwith; opened to goods August 1902; opened to passengers 22 December 1902; still open
- Manchester and Milford Railway at Aberystwith; opened 1 January 1866; closed to passengers 22 February 1965; closed to goods September 1973;

=== Glandovey Junction to Pwllheli ===
- Talyllyn Railway at Towyn; opened December 1867; preserved by Talyllyn Railway Preservation Society 8 February 1951; still open;
- Fairbourne Railway at Fairbourne opened 1895; still open;
- Barmouth Junction and Arthog Tramway at Barmouth Junction; see below;
- Harlech Tramway at Harlech; opened 1878; closed 1886;
- Merionethshire Railway near Llandecwyn; proposed, never built;
- Festiniog Railway at Minffordd; opened to goods 20 April 1836 (pre-existent); opened to passengers 1850; closed to passengers 15 September 1939 closed to goods 1 August 1946 (apart from short section within Blaenau Ffestiniog); purchased by Alan Pegler in co-operation with the Ffestiniog Railway Society 24 June 1954 reopened 23 July 1955 to 25 May 1982 (in stages); still open;
- Croesor Tramway at Beddgelert Sidings, near Porthmadog; opened 1864; became part of the Welsh Highland Railway in 1923; closed 1936; re-opened 2011;
- Gorseddau Junction and Portmadoc Railway at Porthmadog; opened 1872; closed before 1897;
- Carnarvonshire Railway at Afon Wen; opened 29 July 1862; closed December 1964;
- Pwllheli and Llanbedrog Tramway (almost) at Pwllheli; opened 1894; mostly closed 28 October 1927 (apart from small section within Pwllheli); fully closed winter 1928

=== Dolgelly to Barmouth Junction ===
- Bala and Dolgelly Railway at Dolgelly; opened 4 August 1868 (pre-existent); closed to passengers 12 December 1964; reopened 17 December 1964; closed to passengers 18 January 1965; closed to goods 1964.
- Barmouth Junction and Arthog Tramway between Barmouth Junction and Arthog; opened to goods August 1899; opened to passengers June 1903; closed end of 1903.

== See also ==
- Cambrian Coast Line
