= Dolgellau railway station =

Disused railway station in Gwynedd, Wales

Coordinates: 52.7449°N 3.8845°W

Dolgellau
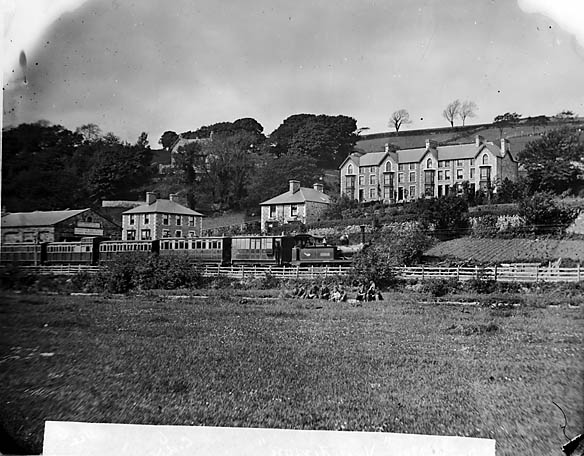

General information
- Location: Dolgellau, Gwynedd; Wales
- Platforms: 2

Other information
- Status: Disused

History
- Original company: Bala and Dolgelly Railway
- Pre-grouping: Great Western Railway
- Post-grouping: Great Western Railway

Key dates
- 4 August 1868: Opened as Dolgelly
- c.1896: renamed Dolgelley
- 12 Sept.1960: renamed Dolgellau
- 4 May 1964: Closed to goods
- 18 January 1965: Closed to passengers
Location

Dolgellau railway station (Welsh pronunciation: [dɔlˈɡɛɬaɨ]) in Gwynedd, North Wales, was a station on the Ruabon to Barmouth line, originally the terminus of a Cambrian Railways branch from Barmouth Junction, then linked by the Great Western Railway to Bala and Ruabon. The station spent most of its life with the spelling "Dolgelley" (often pronounced, especially in English, as [dɔlˈɡɛɬi]); this was altered to "Dolgellau" on 12 September 1960. It was opened on 4 August 1868, and closed to passengers on Monday 18 January 1965 as a result of the Beeching Axe.

It had two platforms and a passing loop, an extensive goods yard and turntable. According to the Official Handbook of Stations the following classes of traffic were being handled at this station in 1956: G, P, F, L, H & C and there was a 6-ton crane.

No trace remains of the station, which was demolished in the late 1970s to make way for the A470 Dolgellau bypass.

== Neighbouring stations ==
Preceding station	Disused railways	Following station
Terminus	Great Western Railway; Bala and Dolgelly Railway	Dolserau Halt; Line and station closed
Penmaenpool; Line and station closed	Cambrian Railways; Aberystwith and Welsh Coast Railway	Terminus
