= Penmaenpool railway station =

Disused railway station in Gwynedd, Wales

Penmaenpool
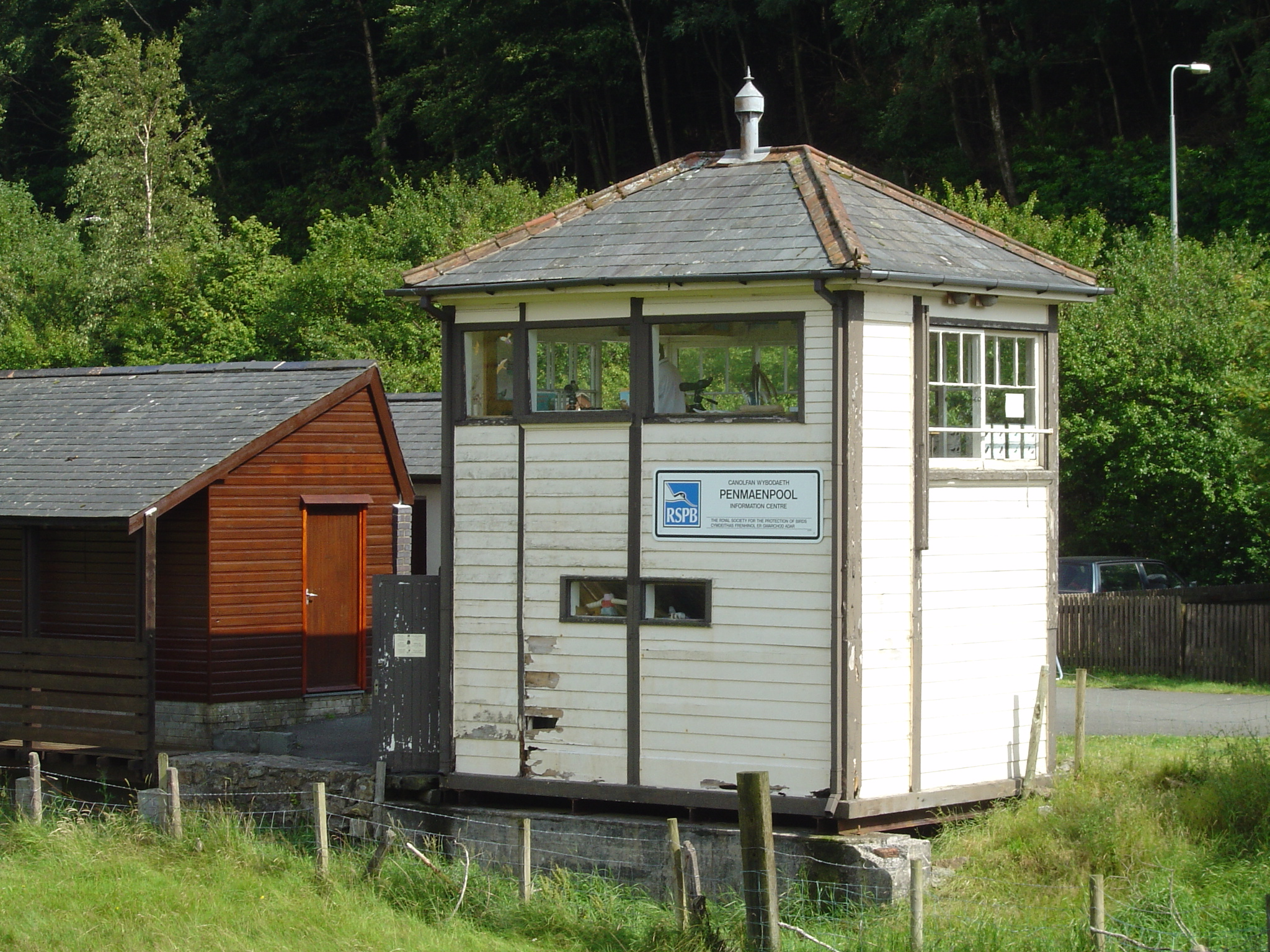
- The former signal box at Penmaenpool, now in use as an RSPB information centre. (17 July 2004)

General information
- Location: Penmaenpool, Gwynedd; Wales
- Coordinates: 52.74857°N 3.93441°W
- Platforms: 2

Other information
- Status: Disused

History
- Original company: Aberystwith and Welsh Coast Railway
- Pre-grouping: Cambrian Railways (GWR)
- Post-grouping: Great Western Railway

Key dates
- 3 July 1865: Opened as Penmaen Pool
- by 1904: Renamed as Penmaenpool
- 18 January 1965: Closed to passengers
- 4 May 1964: Closed to goods
Location

Penmaenpool railway station at Penmaenpool in Gwynedd, North Wales, was formerly a station on the Dolgelly [sic] branch of the Aberystwith and Welsh Coast Railway, part of the Ruabon to Barmouth Line. It closed to passengers on Monday 18 January 1965.

It had two platforms and a passing loop, plus an engine shed approximately half a mile west of the station next to the former fireman's house. According to the Official Handbook of Stations the following classes of traffic were being handled at this station in 1956: G, P, F, L, H & C and there was no crane.

== The site today ==
The station is now occupied by a car park, but the original station signal box remains next to the Penmaenpool Toll Bridge and was used by the RSPB as an observation post and information centre for the local nature reserve. The former station master's house, ticket office and waiting room has been converted into an annexe for the George III hotel. Photographs of the station in its operating days are on display in the bar/reception area of the hotel.

The former trackbed through the site is now in use as a footpath, the Llwybr Mawddach (or "Mawddach Trail").

== Sources ==
- Butt, R. V. J. (October 1995). The Directory of Railway Stations: details every public and private passenger station, halt, platform and stopping place, past and present (1st ed.). Sparkford: Patrick Stephens Ltd. ISBN 978-1-85260-508-7. OCLC 60251199. OL 11956311M.
- Jowett, Alan (March 1989). Jowett's Railway Atlas of Great Britain and Ireland: From Pre-Grouping to the Present Day (1st ed.). Sparkford: Patrick Stephens Ltd. ISBN 978-1-85260-086-0. OCLC 22311137.
- Jowett, Alan (2000). Jowett's Nationalised Railway Atlas (1st ed.). Penryn, Cornwall: Atlantic Transport Publishers. ISBN 978-0-906899-99-1. OCLC 228266687.
- Penmaenpool station on navigable 1946 O. S. map
- Photos of Penmaenpool Station at Dolgellau.net
- Photo of the engine shed
- The RSPB at Mawddach

Preceding station	Disused railways	Following station
Arthog; Line and station closed	Cambrian Railways; Aberystwith and Welsh Coast Railway	Dolgellau; Line and station closed
