= Fairbourne station =

Fairbourne Station may refer to:

- Fairbourne railway station, a railway station that serves the village of Fairbourne in Gwynedd, Wales
- Fairbourne Station, a transit oriented commercial development West Valley City, Utah, United States that includes the West Valley Central station
