= Arthog railway station =

Disused railway station in Gwynedd, Wales

Arthog
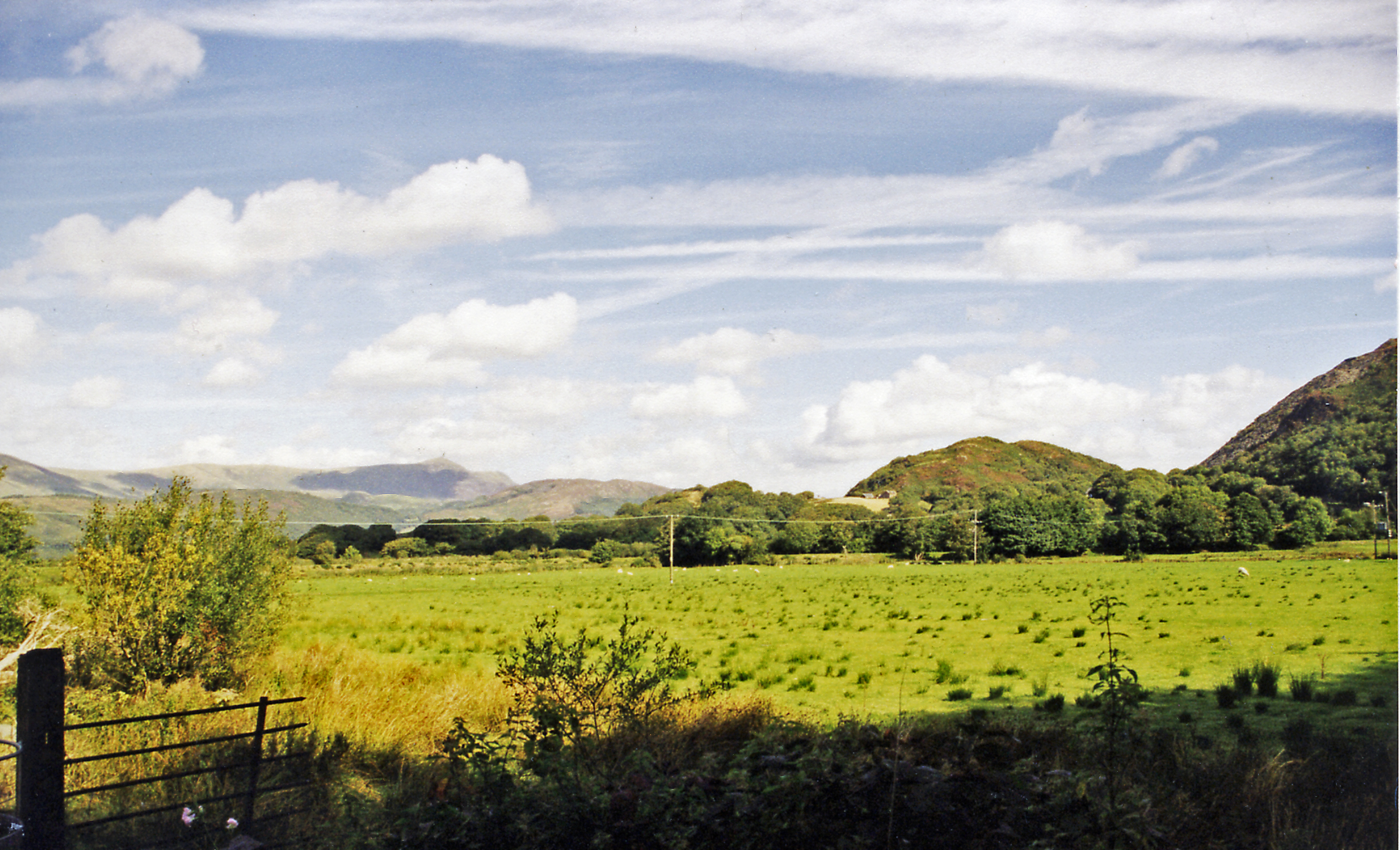
- View up Afon Mawddach valley towards site of Arthog station in 1999

General information
- Location: Arthog, Gwynedd; Wales
- Coordinates: 52.71343°N 4.01481°W
- Platforms: 1

Other information
- Status: Disused

History
- Original company: Aberystwith and Welsh Coast Railway
- Pre-grouping: Cambrian Railways (GWR)
- Post-grouping: Great Western Railway

Key dates
- 28 Mar 1870: Opened
- 18 Jan 1965: Closed to passengers
- 4 May 1964: Closed to goods
Location

Arthog railway station in Gwynedd, Wales, was a station on the Dolgelly [sic] branch of the Aberystwith and Welsh Coast Railway (part of the Ruabon to Barmouth Line). It closed to passengers on 18 January 1965.

== History ==
The station was built by the Aberystwith and Welsh Coast Railway, which became part of the Cambrian Railways before becoming part of the Great Western Railway. The line then passed on to the Western Region of British Railways on nationalisation in 1948, and was closed by the British Railways Board. A camping coach was positioned here by the Western Region from 1953 to 1962. According to the Official Handbook of Stations the following classes of traffic were being handled at this station in 1956: G & P and there was no crane.

== The site today ==
The former trackbed is now the Llwybr Mawddach (or "Mawddach Trail"), but there are no remains of the station except for the access road running from the A493 to the station site.

== Neighbouring stations ==
Preceding station	Disused railways	Following station
Barmouth Junction; Line closed, station open	Cambrian Railways; Aberystwith and Welsh Coast Railway	Penmaenpool; Line and station closed

== Sources ==
- Butt, R. V. J. (October 1995). The Directory of Railway Stations: details every public and private passenger station, halt, platform and stopping place, past and present (1st ed.). Sparkford: Patrick Stephens Ltd. ISBN 978-1-85260-508-7. OCLC 60251199. OL 11956311M.
- Jowett, Alan (March 1989). Jowett's Railway Atlas of Great Britain and Ireland: From Pre-Grouping to the Present Day (1st ed.). Sparkford: Patrick Stephens Ltd. ISBN 978-1-85260-086-0. OCLC 22311137.
- Jowett, Alan (2000). Jowett's Nationalised Railway Atlas (1st ed.). Penryn, Cornwall: Atlantic Transport Publishers. ISBN 978-0-906899-99-1. OCLC 228266687.
