= Barmouth Junction and Arthog Tramway =

Tramway operator in Wales

Operation
- Locale: Arthog
- Open: August 1899
- Close: August 1903
- Status: Closed

Infrastructure
- Track gauge: 3 ft (914 mm)
- Propulsion system: Horse

Statistics
- Route length: 2 miles (3.2 km)

The Barmouth Junction and Arthog Tramway operated a 3 ft (914 mm) narrow gauge tramway service in Arthog between 1899 and 1903.

== History ==
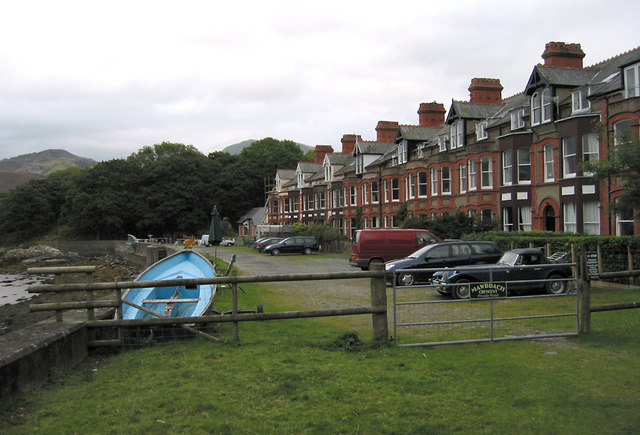
Mawddach Crescent

The tramway was built by Solomon Andrews in 1899 as part of his scheme to develop Arthog as a holiday resort. It used the routes of previous tramways which had been constructed from the 1860s as part of quarrying operations.

Construction of the tramway began in 1899 with a route from the Arthog side to Vegla Island. It was used to carry materials for building roads and houses

The tram road opened to the public in June 1903 with services operating daily Initially a success Solomon Andrews started work on another tramroad which was to run from the entrance of Barmouth Bridge over the sands along the embankment which runs along the railway to the waterfalls above Tyddyn Sheffri.

The tramway connected Mawddach Crescent to Barmouth Junction railway station and other lines were built to local quarries to provide building material for the terraces of houses built as part of the holiday resort project.

== Closure ==
The project failed, and after one or two seasons the tramway was closed, never to re-open. The single passenger car was transferred to the Pwllheli and Llanbedrog Tramway.
