= Arthog =

Village in Gwynedd, Wales

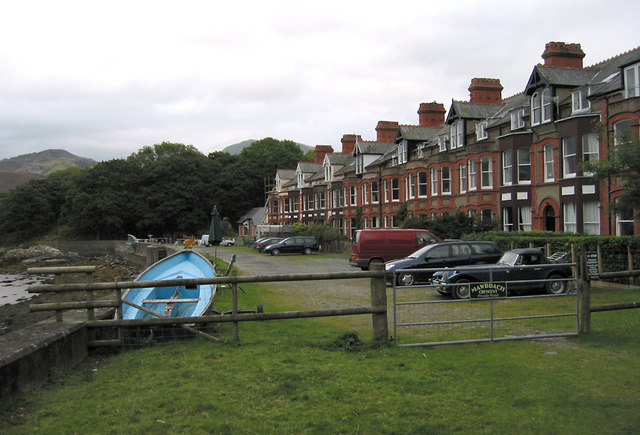
- Mawddach Crescent was the first and only phase of an Edwardian holiday resort built by Cardiff entrepreneur, Solomon Andrews, in the early 20th century.

- Location within Gwynedd
- Population: 1,031 (2011)
- OS grid reference: SH642145
- Community: Arthog
- Principal area: Gwynedd
- Country: Wales
- Sovereign state: United Kingdom
- Post town: FAIRBOURNE
- Postcode district: LL38
- Post town: ARTHOG
- Postcode district: LL39
- Post town: DOLGELLAU
- Postcode district: LL40
- Dialling code: 01341
- Police: North Wales
- Fire: North Wales
- Ambulance: Welsh
- UK Parliament: Dwyfor Meirionnydd
- Senedd Cymru – Welsh Parliament: Gwynedd Maldwyn
- List of places UK Wales Gwynedd 52.711°N 4.009°W Map of the community

Arthog (Welsh pronunciation) is a village, post town and community in the Meirionnydd area in Gwynedd, north Wales including the villages of Fairbourne and Friog. It is located on the A493, approximately 8 miles (13 km) west of Dolgellau, and had a population of 1,010 in 2001, increasing slightly to 1,031 at the 2011 census.

== Etymology ==
The village was named after the Welsh ruler Arthog ap Ceredig

== History ==
In 1894, Solomon Andrews, a Cardiff entrepreneur, bought land overlooking the Mawddach estuary. On the site he completed Mawddach Crescent in 1902. The row of terraced properties was the start of a purpose-built holiday resort he intended for the area. However the planned development went no further because the surrounding land proved unsuitable for urban planning. During the Second World War, the Royal Marines commandeered Mawddach Crescent. It became known as Iceland Camp. The marines also built huts on nearby Fegla Fawr; the foundation bases can still be seen between the trees above the estuary.

It is well known for its outdoor activity centres and the nearby Llynnau Cregennen. The Arthog Outdoor Education Centre is owned by Telford and Wrekin Council and is primarily used in term-time by schools from the Shropshire and Telford & Wrekin Local Education Authorities.

There is a 200-metre cascade of publicly accessible waterfalls within the parish.

== Population ==
According to the 2011 census, 28.3% of the community's residents were able to speak Welsh. Consequently, Arthog had the lowest percentage of Welsh speakers of any community in Gwynedd. 70.6% of the community's residents were born outside Wales.

== Transport ==
The village was served by Arthog railway station (on the Barmouth - Ruabon line) until the complete closure of the line in 1964. The line is now a footpath known as the Mawddach Trail (Welsh: Llwybr Mawddach), and is popular with both walkers and cyclists. Morfa Mawddach railway station is on the western outskirts of the village. The station is situated on the Cambrian Line with direct trains northbound to Pwllheli via Barmouth and Porthmadog and southbound to Birmingham International via Machynlleth and Shrewsbury.
