= Penmaenpool =

Hamlet in Gwynedd, Wales

Coordinates: 52.747°N 3.936°W

Penmaenpool: Welsh: Llynpenmaen
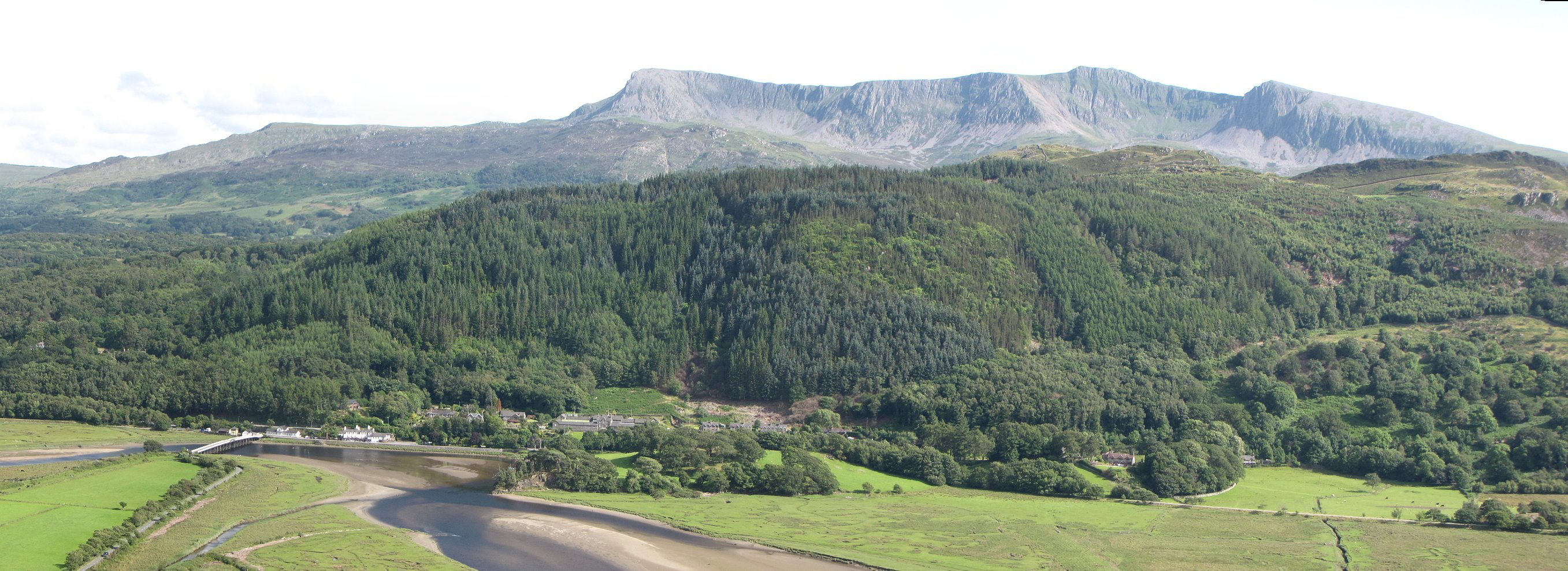
- Penmaenpool with Cader Idris in the background

- Location within Gwynedd
- OS grid reference: SH693184
- Community: Dolgellau
- Principal area: Gwynedd
- Country: Wales
- Sovereign state: United Kingdom
- Post town: DOLGELLAU
- Postcode district: LL40
- Dialling code: 01341
- Police: North Wales
- Fire: North Wales
- Ambulance: Welsh
- UK Parliament: Dwyfor Meirionnydd
- Senedd Cymru – Welsh Parliament: Dwyfor Meirionnydd

Penmaenpool (Welsh: Llynpenmaen) is a hamlet on the south side of the estuary of the River Mawddach in Wales, near Dolgellau. A Grade II listed toll bridge provides access across the estuary for light vehicles.

== Points of interest ==
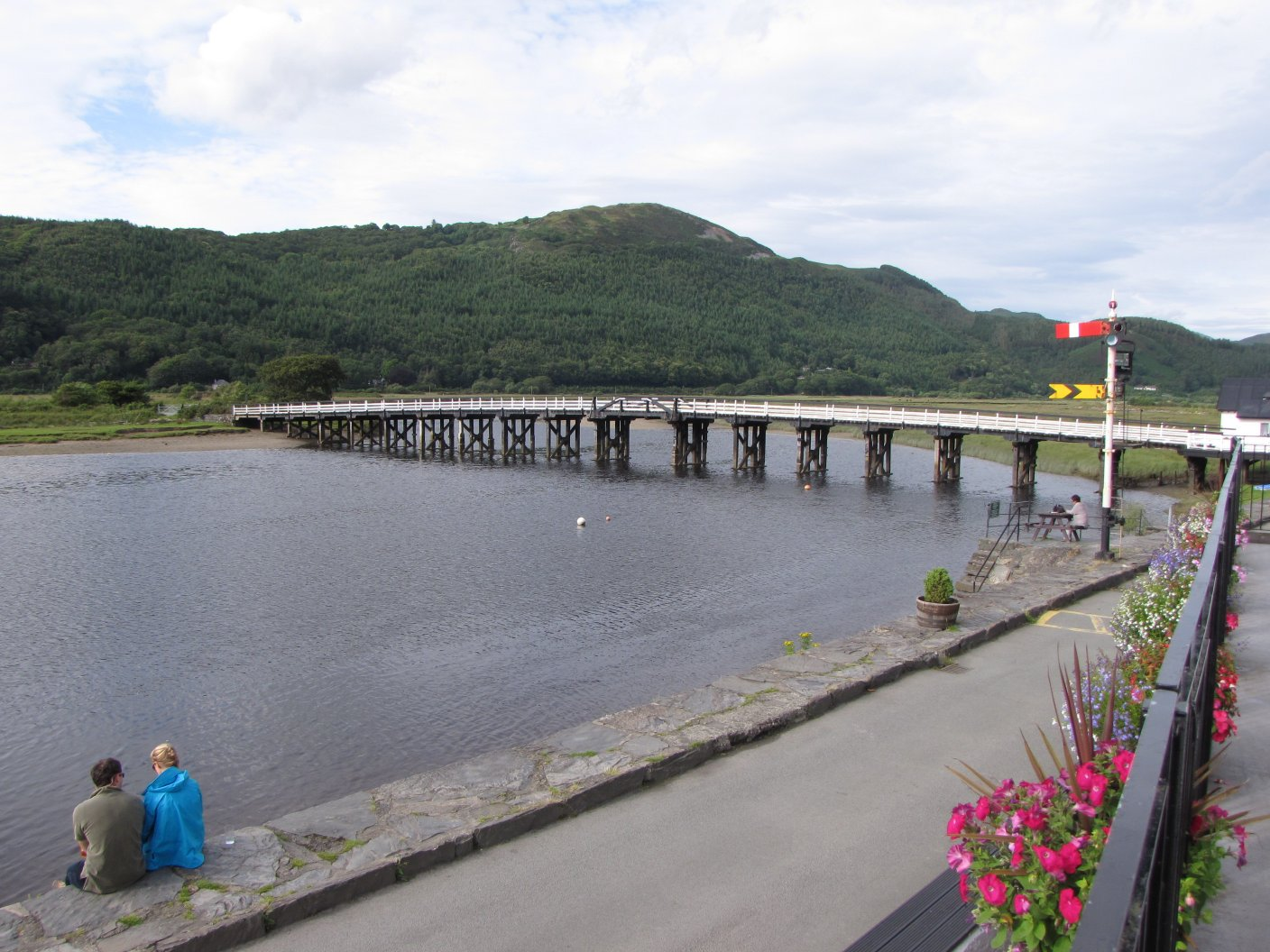
Penmaenpool toll bridge

Penmaenpool toll bridge is a wooden toll bridge built in 1879 to replace a ferry crossing. It links the A493 running along the south bank of the Mawddach to the A496 running along the north. It is Cadw-registered and was Grade II listed in 1990. The bridge can only be used by vehicles under 2.5 tonnes, and around 200 crossings are made each day.

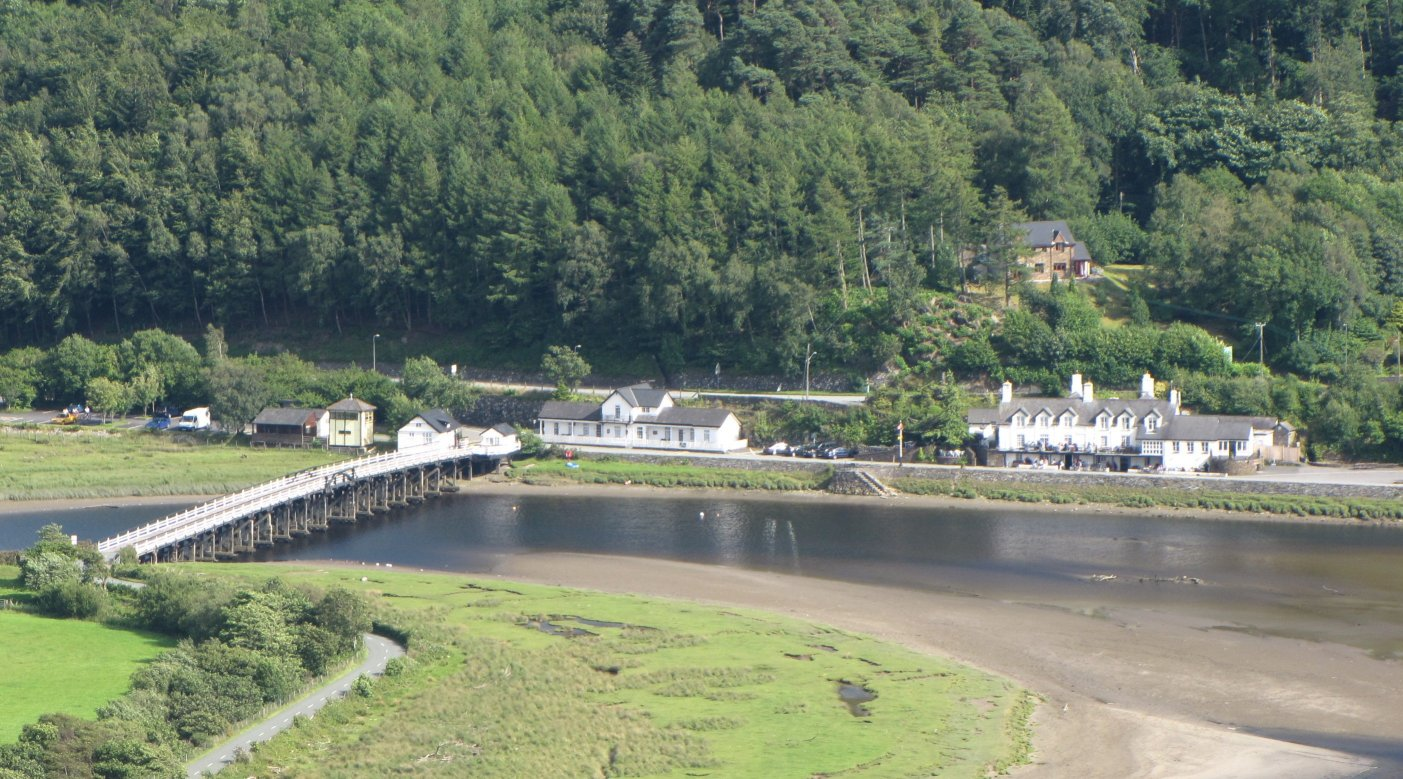
Penmaenpool toll bridge, old signal box and George III Inn (right)

The George III Inn was originally two buildings: a ship chandler serving the boatbuilding industry, and a pub. It dates from approximately 1650. Gerard Manley Hopkins reputedly wrote the poem entitled "Penmaen Pool" in the visitors' book.

Penmaenpool railway station was on the Aberystwith and Welsh Coast Railway. It opened as Penmaen Pool on 3 July 1865, and closed to goods on 4 May 1964 and passengers on 18 January 1965. The route is now part of the Mawddach Trail and is popular with walkers.

== Incidents ==
Fifteen people, including four children, drowned on 22 July 1966 when the ferry Prince of Wales hit the toll bridge and sank. The ferry had been taking 39 people on a pleasure trip from Barmouth to the hotel in the village. Though 27 lives were saved, nobody was officially recognised for bravery. A memorial was held beside the signal box on the 50th anniversary of the disaster in 2016, and a plaque was unveiled commemorating the victims.
