= Fairbourne railway station =

Railway station in Gwynedd, Wales

Fairbourne
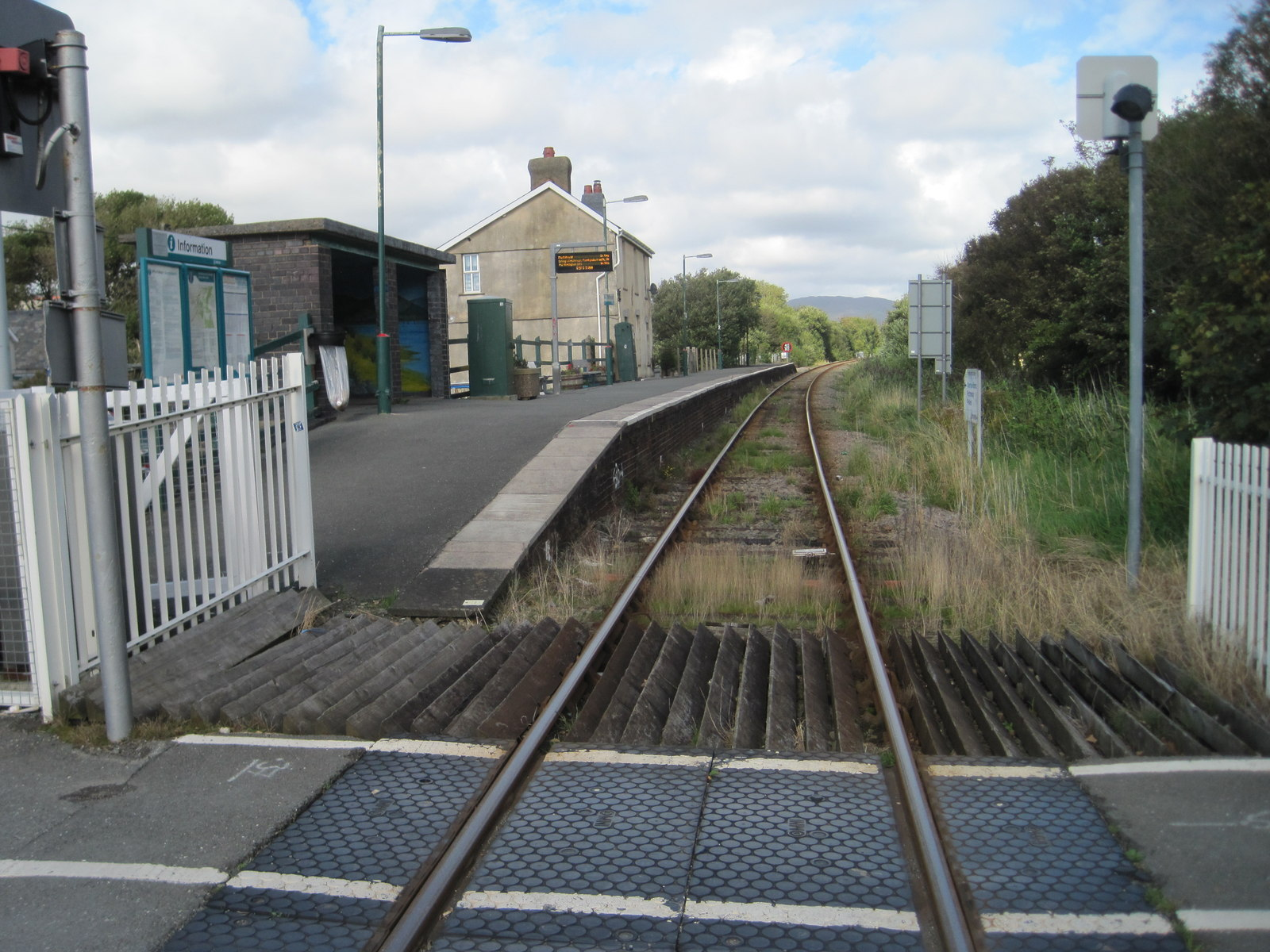

General information
- Location: Fairbourne, Gwynedd; Wales
- Coordinates: 52.696°N 4.049°W
- Grid reference: SH616128
- Manager: Transport for Wales
- Platforms: 1

Other information
- Station code: FRB
- Classification: DfT category F2

History
- Original company: Aberystwith and Welsh Coast Railway
- Pre-grouping: Cambrian Railways
- Post-grouping: Great Western Railway

Key dates
- 3 July 1865: Opened as Barmouth Ferry
- 3 June 1867: Closed
- 6 June 1899: Reopened as Fairbourne

Passengers
- 2021/22: ▲18,438
- 2022/23: ▲29,388
- 2023/24: ▲31,862
- 2024/25: ▲44,390
- 2025/26: ▲48,626
Location
Notes
- Passenger statistics from the Office of Rail and Road

Fairbourne railway station serves the village of Fairbourne in Gwynedd, Wales. It is an unstaffed station on the Cambrian Coast Railway with passenger services to Barmouth, Harlech, Porthmadog, Pwllheli, Tywyn, Aberdovey, Machynlleth and Shrewsbury.

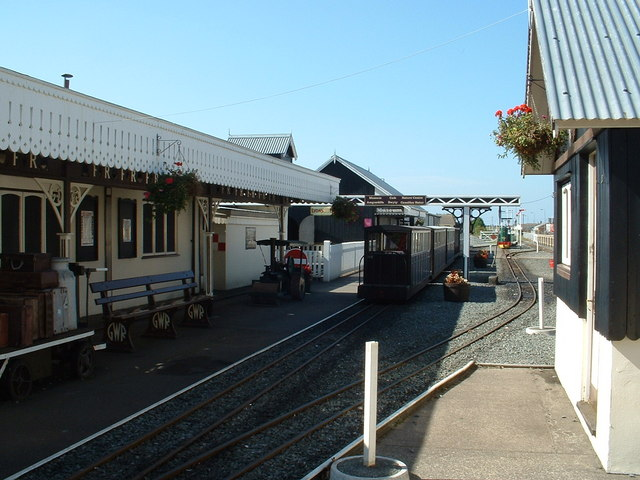
The Fairbourne Railway station

The 12¼ inch gauge Fairbourne Railway has a separate station nearby from which narrow gauge trains run the 2 miles from Fairbourne to Barmouth Ferry (Penrhyn Point).

== History ==
The station first opened on 3 July 1865 and closed on 3 June 1867, during which time it was named Barmouth Ferry. It reopened as Fairbourne on 6 June 1899.

== Services ==
There is a two-hourly service between Pwllheli and Machynlleth, with certain services continuing to Birmingham International.

There are 5 trains per day between Pwllheli and Machynlleth on Sundays.

Preceding station	National Rail	Following station
Morfa Mawddach	Transport for Wales; Cambrian Coast Line	Llwyngwril
	Heritage railways	
Change for Fairbourne station on the Fairbourne Railway
	Historical railways	
Barmouth Junction; Line and station open	Cambrian Railways; Aberystwith and Welsh Coast Railway	Llwyngwril; Line and station open
