= Morfa Mawddach railway station =

Railway station in Gwynedd, Wales

Morfa Mawddach
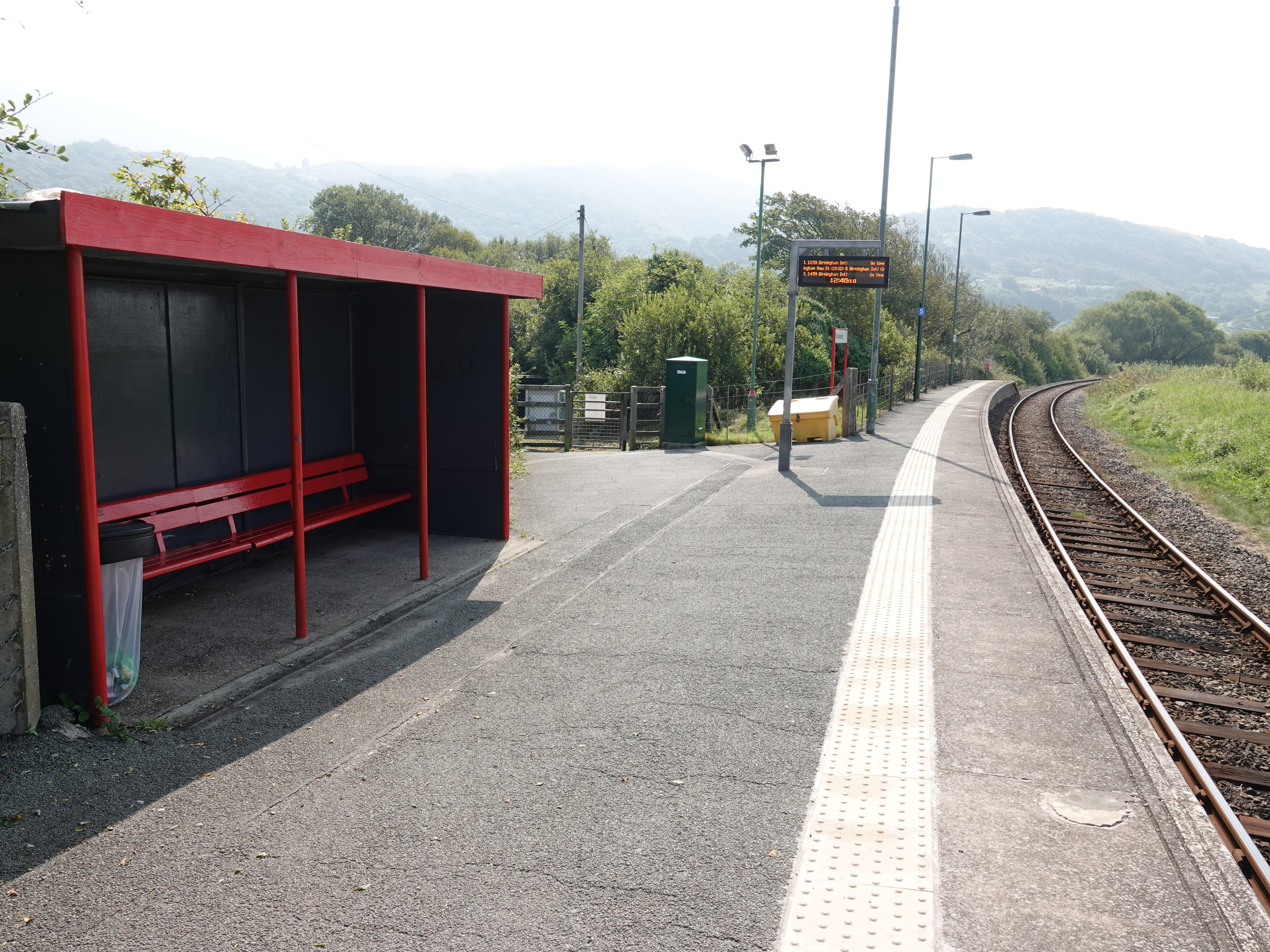

General information
- Location: Arthog, Gwynedd; Wales
- Coordinates: 52.7077°N 4.0316°W
- Grid reference: SH628142
- Manager: Transport for Wales
- Platforms: 1

Other information
- Station code: MFA
- Classification: DfT category F2

History
- Original company: Aberystwith and Welsh Coast Railway
- Pre-grouping: Cambrian Railways
- Post-grouping: Great Western Railway

Key dates
- 3 July 1865: Opened as Barmouth Junction
- 13 June 1960: Renamed Morfa Mawddach

Passengers
- 2021/22: ▲5,320
- 2022/23: ▲8,174
- 2023/24: ▲8,642
- 2024/25: ▲13,508
- 2025/26: ▲15,656
Location
Notes
- Passenger statistics from the Office of Rail and Road

Morfa Mawddach railway station (formerly Barmouth Junction) is a station located on the outskirts of the village of Arthog in Gwynedd, Wales, on the Cambrian Coast line which runs between Machynlleth and Pwllheli. Built by the Aberystwith and Welsh Coast Railway in 1865, it was formerly the junction station for the Ruabon to Barmouth Line. It is now a minor station on the Cambrian Line, sited 99 miles (159.3 km) from Whitchurch (measured via Oswestry), between Barmouth and Fairbourne.

== History ==
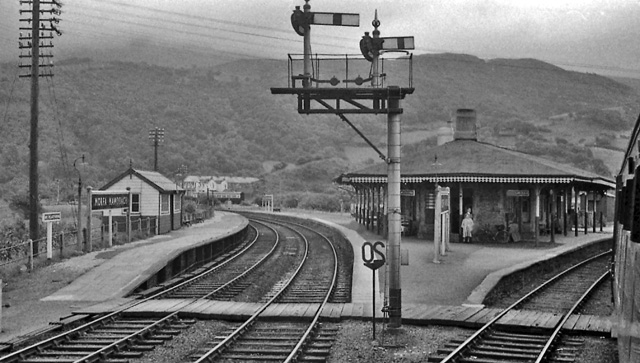
The station as it was in 1962

The station was built by the Aberystwith [sic] and Welsh Coast Railway and opened on 5 June 1867 as Barmouth Junction, originally as the terminus of the line from the south, until Barmouth Bridge opened in October. The line to Ruabon opened two years later, with junctions being built for trains travelling both towards Harlech and Dovey Junction, with the southern triangle later being lifted in part to become a siding. The line to Ruabon closed in its entirety in 1965. In the early 20th century, there was a connection with the Barmouth Junction and Arthog Tramway. The current platform was formerly the southbound platform for trains towards Machynlleth.

The station was host to a GWR camp coach from 1934 to 1939. A camping coach was also positioned here by the Western Region from 1956 to 1962. In 1963 the administration of camping coaches at the station was taken over by the London Midland, there were three coaches here in 1963 and 1964 and two from 1965 to 1968.

On 13 June 1960, it was renamed Morfa Mawddach. The station was staffed until 1968.

Morfa Mawddach is mainly used by passengers travelling to Barmouth from south of the Mawddach Estuary: parking at the station and taking the train to Barmouth is often much quicker than the 20-mile road journey via Dolgellau.

Morfa Mawddach is often quoted as an example of a notable feature of the Great Western Railway in Wales, namely its inheritance of junctions in unlikely and inconvenient locations. Other examples are Moat Lane Junction, Talyllyn Junction, Afon Wen and Dovey Junction.

The trackbed to Dolgellau now forms the Mawddach Trail (Welsh: Llwybr Mawddach), 9.5 mi (15.3 km) long.

== Facilities ==
The station has very few facilities. There is no help point available. There is a small waiting shelter and a car park with 20 spaces and public toilets beside the former platform of the Dolgellau line.

== Passenger volume ==
Passenger volume at Morfa Mawddach
	2004–05	2005–06	2006–07	2007–08	2008–09	2009–10	2010–11	2011–12	2012–13	2013–14	2014–15	2015–16	2016–17	2017–18	2018–19	2019–20	2020–21	2021–22	2022–23	2023–24	2024–25
Entries and exits	6,462	7,106	7,823	7,385	7,152	8,558	9,936	9,614	10,902	9,962	10,758	11,094	10,880	11,434	11,920	11,022	894	5,320	8,174	8,642	13,508

The statistics cover twelve month periods that start in April.

== Services ==
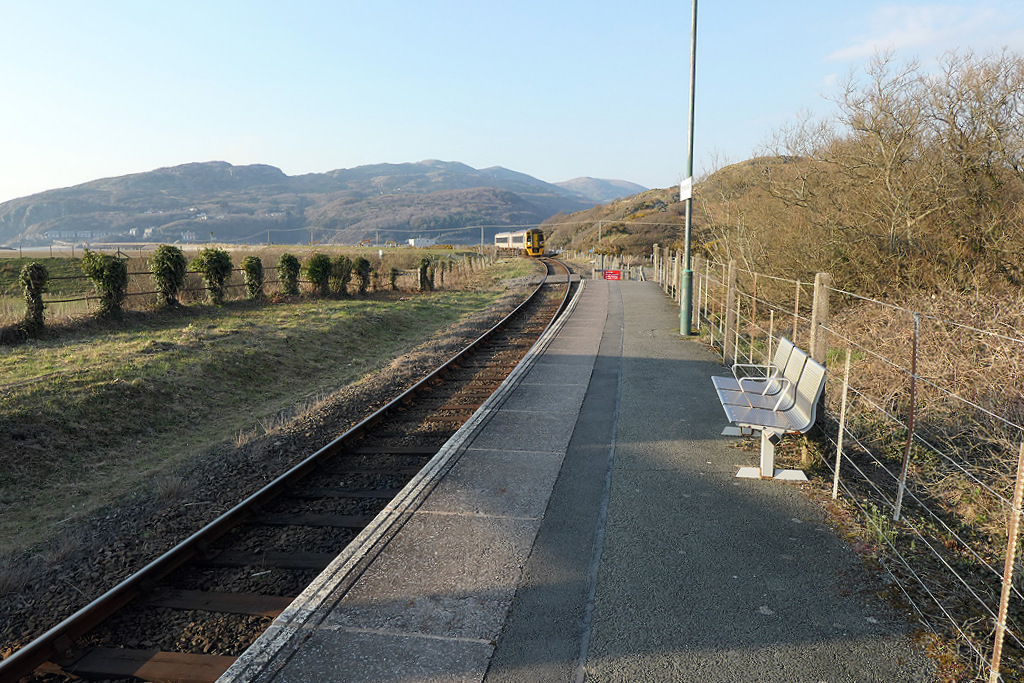
A Transport for Wales train approaches the station in 2022

Originally a four-platform station, it is now a single platform unstaffed halt. Trains stop on request.

All services are operated by Transport for Wales Rail. On weekdays services are approximately every two hours each way, with most running southbound to Birmingham International (via Shrewsbury and Birmingham New Street), with all northbound services terminating at Pwllheli.

Preceding station	National Rail	Following station
Barmouth	Transport for Wales; Cambrian Coast Line	Fairbourne
	Historical railways	
Barmouth; Line and station open	Cambrian Railways; Aberystwith and Welsh Coast Railway	Arthog; Line and station closed
Barmouth; Line and station open	Cambrian Railways; Aberystwith and Welsh Coast Railway	Fairbourne; Line and station open

== Community rail ==
The station, along with all others on the Cambrian Line, is part of the Cambrian Railway Partnership, a community rail organisation.

== Bibliography ==
- Butt, R. V. J. (October 1995). The Directory of Railway Stations: details every public and private passenger station, halt, platform and stopping place, past and present (1st ed.). Sparkford: Patrick Stephens Ltd. ISBN 978-1-85260-508-7. OCLC 60251199. OL 11956311M.
- Caton, Peter (2018). Remote Stations. Leicestershire: Matador. ISBN 978-1-78901-408-2.
- Fenton, Mike (1999). Camp Coach Holidays on the G.W.R. Wild Swan. ISBN 1-874103-53-4.
- McRae, Andrew (1997). British Railway Camping Coach Holidays: The 1930s & British Railways (London Midland Region). Vol. Scenes from the Past: 30 (Part One). Foxline. ISBN 1-870119-48-7.
- McRae, Andrew (1998). British Railways Camping Coach Holidays: A Tour of Britain in the 1950s and 1960s. Vol. Scenes from the Past: 30 (Part Two). Foxline. ISBN 1-870119-53-3.
- Quick, Michael (2023). Railway Passenger Stations in Great Britain: A Chronology (PDF) (5th ed.). London: Railway and Canal Historical Society.
