= Mawddach Trail =

Cycle path route, part of Lôn Las Cymru

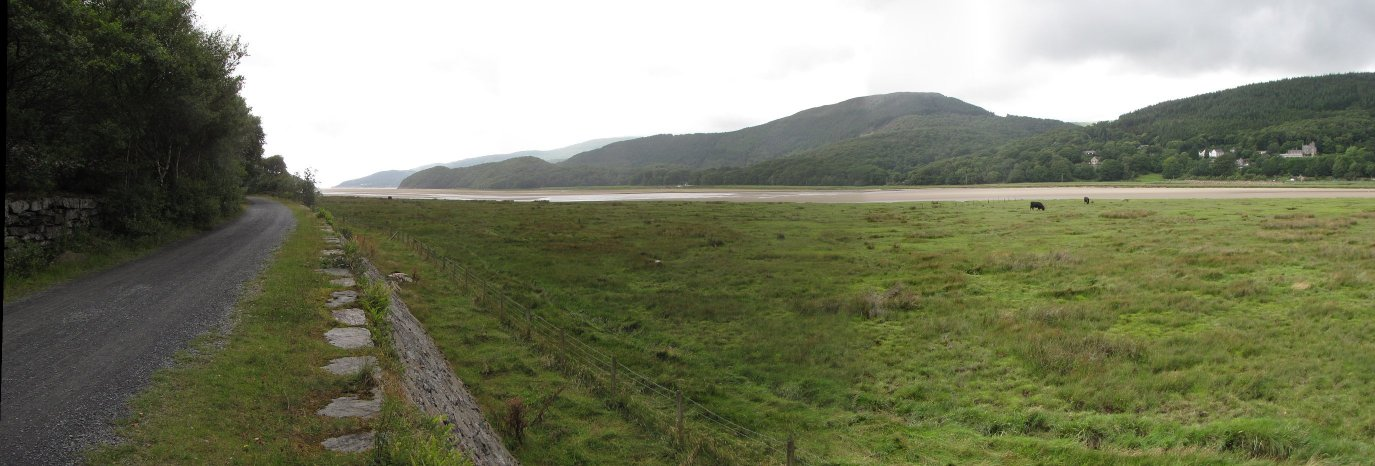
Mawddach trail

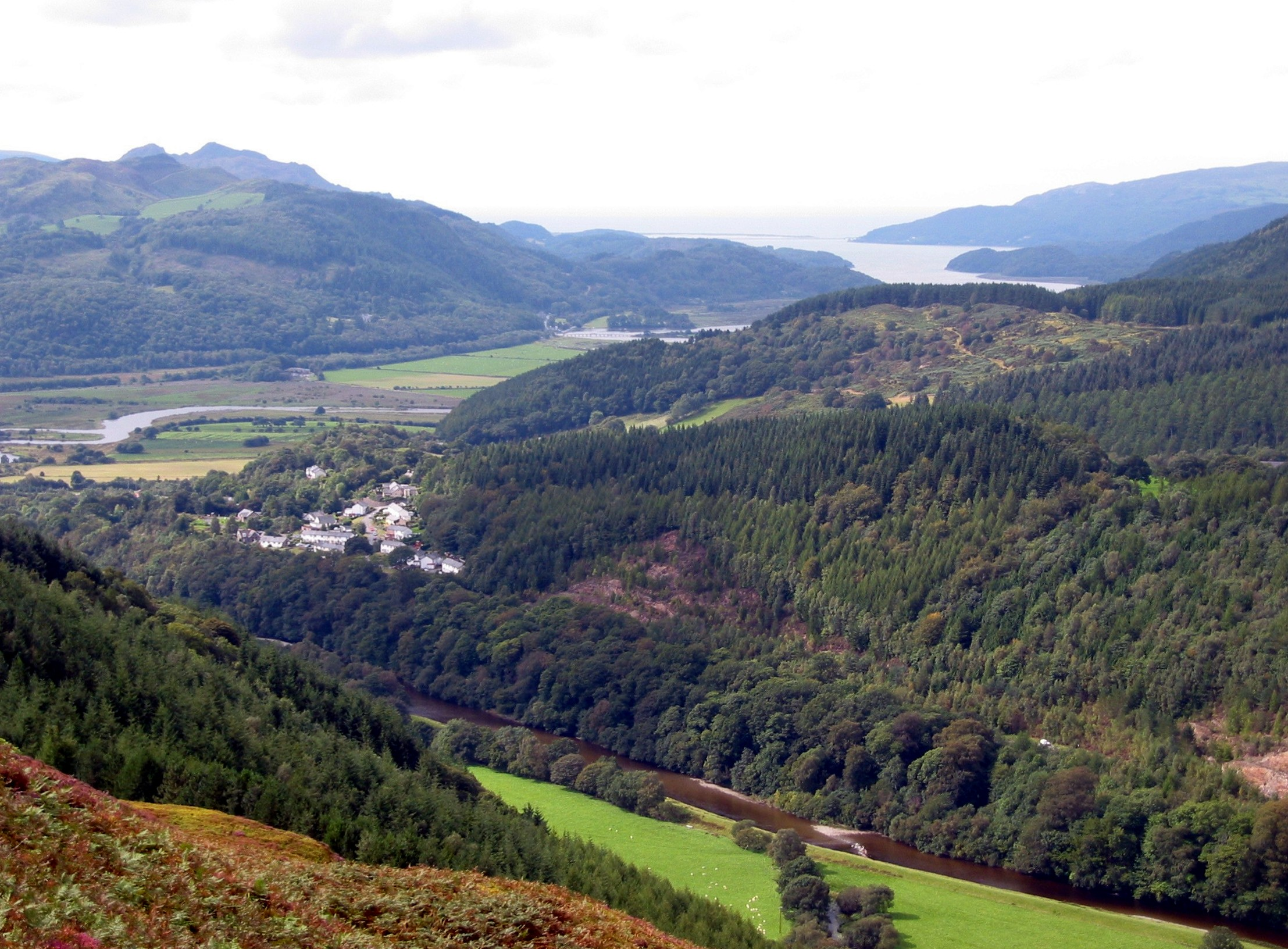
The Mawddach Trail follows the southern (furthest from camera) bank of the Afon Mawddach

The Mawddach Trail (Welsh: Llwybr Mawddach) is a cycle path route, part of Lôn Las Cymru, which runs for some 8 miles (13 km) from Dolgellau (52.7446°N 3.8866°W) to Morfa Mawddach railway station (52.7076°N 4.0315°W), by Barmouth bridge on the Cambrian coast. It is maintained by the Snowdonia National Park and is popular with walkers and cyclists alike. It passes some estuarine areas that are important for water birds, and the RSPB Information Centre at Penmaenpool makes use of the old signal box as an observation centre overlooking the estuary.

The cycle route is a rail trail running along the former trackbed of the Ruabon to Barmouth branch line of the Great Western Railway. This line closed under the Beeching Axe in the 1960s.
