= Talsarnau railway station =

Railway station in Gwynedd, Wales

Talsarnau
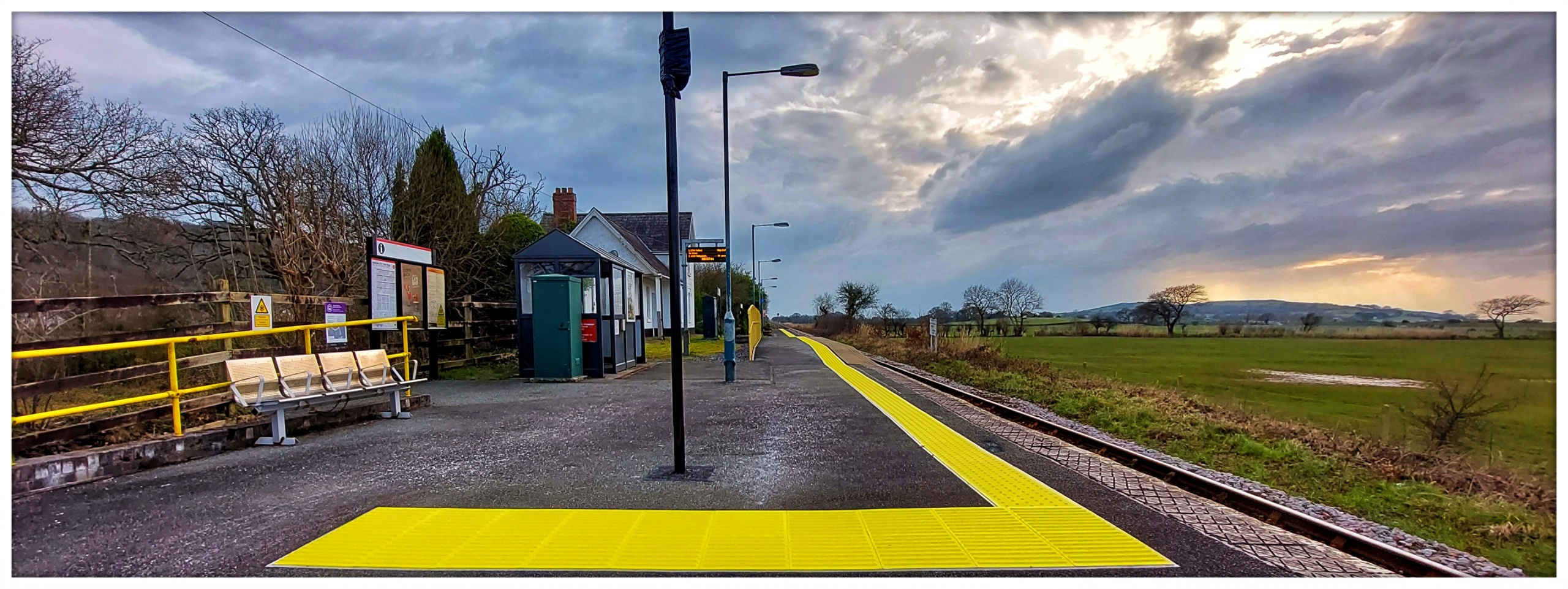

General information
- Location: Talsarnau, Gwynedd; Wales
- Coordinates: 52.904418°N 4.068134°W
- Grid reference: SH609361
- Manager: Transport for Wales
- Platforms: 1

Other information
- Station code: TAL
- Classification: DfT category F2

History
- Opened: 10 October 1867
- Original company: Aberystwith and Welsh Coast Railway
- Pre-grouping: Cambrian Railways
- Post-grouping: Great Western Railway

Passengers
- 2021/22: ▲1,828
- 2022/23: ▲3,030
- 2023/24: ▲3,576
- 2024/25: ▲4,988
- 2025/26: ▲5,702
Location
Notes
- Passenger statistics from the Office of Rail and Road

Talsarnau railway station serves the village of Talsarnau on the estuary of the Afon Dwyryd in Gwynedd, Wales. It is on the Cambrian Line between Llandecwyn and Tygwyn, 114 miles 42 chains (184.3 km) from Whitchurch, measured via Oswestry (the original line diverging at Welshpool). The station is the nearest station for walkers for Ynys Gifftan.

== History ==
The station opened on 10 October 1867. The location of the station itself used to be where the sea now is, until builders created embankments to construct the railway. The station was formerly a receiving point for wool and timber for slate mines.

Between November 2013 and September 2014, services were suspended north of Harlech due to issues with construction of Pont Briwet, near Penrhyndeudraeth.

== Facilities ==
The station has a Harrington hump, a part of the platform which has been raised to enable better access on to the train. The station has a small car park, a bench, a shelter and a live departure screen. As there are no facilities to purchase tickets, passengers must buy one in advance, or from the guard on the train.

== Passenger volume ==
Passenger volume at Talsarnau
	2004–05	2005–06	2006–07	2007–08	2008–09	2009–10	2010–11	2011–12	2012–13	2013–14	2014–15	2015–16	2016–17	2017–18	2018–19	2019–20	2020–21	2021–22	2022–23	2023–24	2024–25
Entries and exits	4,271	4,533	7,341	8,789	9,854	9,216	9,742	12,068	9,942	7,026	5,836	8,028	6,032	5,400	5,890	5,152	204	1,828	3,030	3,576	4,988

The statistics cover twelve month periods that start in April.

== Services ==
The station is an unstaffed halt with passenger services to Pwllheli and Machynlleth. On weekdays there are eight services each way. All trains call on request.

From 1 September to 1 December 2023, engineering work took place to finish restoration of the Barmouth Viaduct. Rail replacement buses served stations from Pwllheli to Machynlleth.

Preceding station	National Rail	Following station
Llandecwyn	Transport for Wales Cambrian Coast Line	Tygwyn
	Historical railways	
Llandecwyn; Line and station open	Cambrian Railways; Aberystwith and Welsh Coast Railway	Tygwyn; Line and station open

== Bibliography ==
- Butt, R. V. J. (October 1995). The Directory of Railway Stations: details every public and private passenger station, halt, platform and stopping place, past and present (1st ed.). Sparkford: Patrick Stephens Ltd. ISBN 978-1-85260-508-7. OCLC 60251199. OL 11956311M.
- Jowett, Alan (March 1989). Jowett's Railway Atlas of Great Britain and Ireland: From Pre-Grouping to the Present Day (1st ed.). Sparkford: Patrick Stephens Ltd. ISBN 978-1-85260-086-0. OCLC 22311137.
- Quick, Michael (2023). Railway Passenger Stations in Great Britain: A Chronology (PDF) (5th ed.). London: Railway and Canal Historical Society.
- Wills, Dixe (2014). Tiny Stations (Paperback, 1st reprint ed.). Basingstoke: AA Publishing. ISBN 978-0-7495-7732-2.
