= Tonfanau railway station =

Railway station in Gwynedd, Wales

Tonfanau
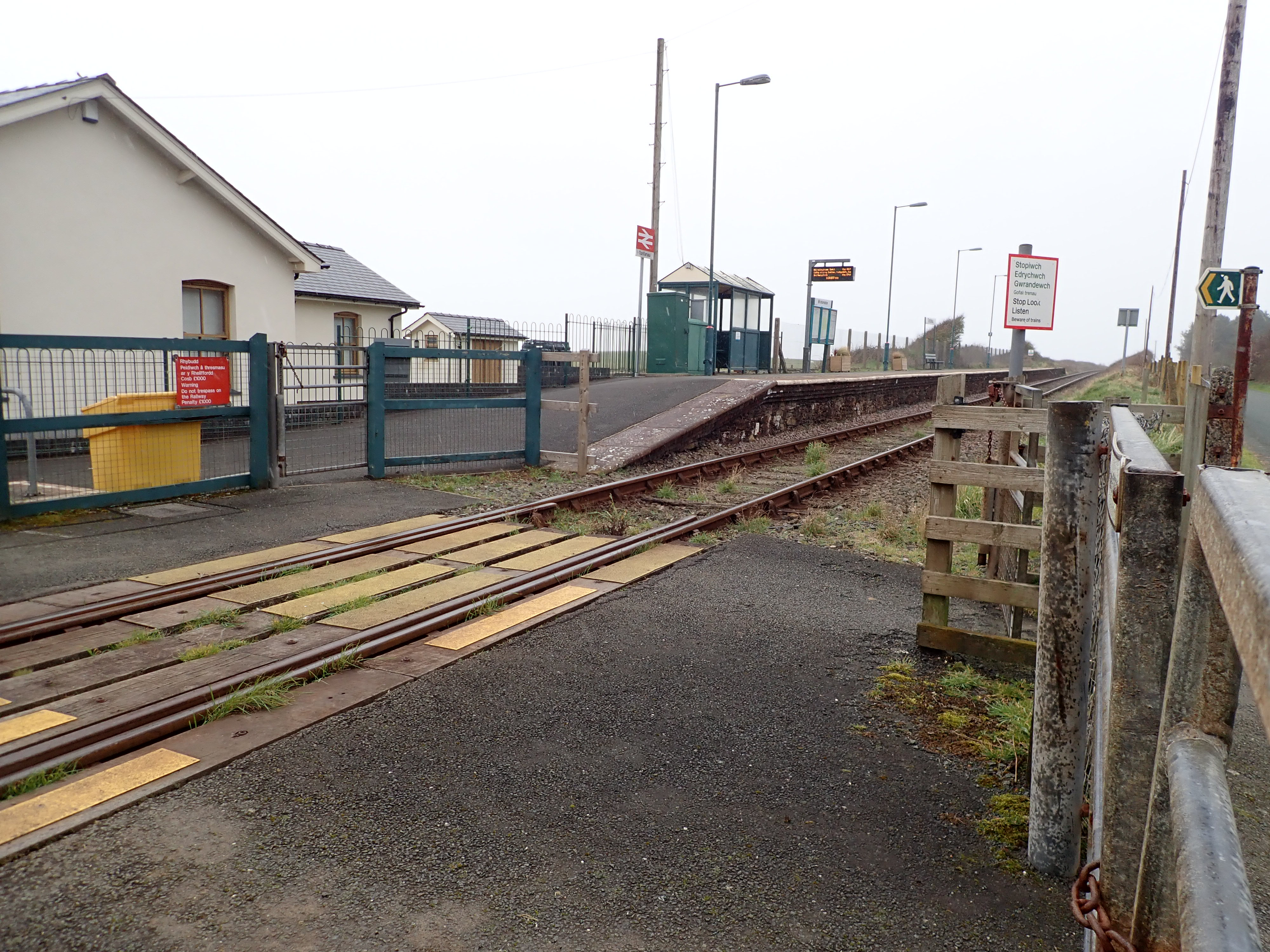

General information
- Location: Tonfanau, Gwynedd; Wales
- Coordinates: 52.614°N 4.124°W
- Grid reference: SH563038
- Manager: Transport for Wales
- Platforms: 1

Other information
- Station code: TNF
- Classification: DfT category F2

Passengers
- 2021/22: ▲1,116
- 2022/23: ▲1,556
- 2023/24: ▲2,380
- 2024/25: ▲2,490
- 2025/26: ▲2,740
Location
Notes
- Passenger statistics from the Office of Rail and Road

Tonfanau railway station is a railway stop that serves Tonfanau in Gwynedd, Wales. The station is located alongside the ruins of the army base it once served and only a couple of occupied buildings can be found within the surrounding area. It is on the Cambrian Line, between Llwyngwril and Tywyn, 84 miles 8 chains (135.3 km) from Whitchurch, measured via Oswestry (the original line diverging at Welshpool).

== History ==
The station, which was opened by the Cambrian Railways, first appeared in Bradshaw in July 1896.

Dixe Wills in Tiny Stations mentions the role of the station in 1972, in rehousing Ugandan Asian refugees:

... in 1972, it was more or less extant and party to an event that gripped the news at the time. It was on a miserably wet and windy night in the autumn of that year that a special train pulled into Tonfanau station carrying the first group of around 1,300 Ugandan Asian refugees given shelter at the former army camp. The train apparently had to stop and shuffle along four times in order that all the passengers could get out onto the short platform.

Due to the deteriorating condition of the platforms, British Rail had considered withdrawing services as from 14 May 1984, but the station was reprieved with minimum maintenance on the grounds of 'educational journeys and the occasional passenger'. The question of closure was revisited by British Rail in the 1990s when it requested the permission of the Secretary of State for Transport to close Tonfanau and three other Cambrian Coast stations (namely Abererch, Llandecwyn and Tygwyn). Their winter 1995/96 timetable featured only one northbound and three southbound trains Mondays to Saturdays, with a note that the service may be withdrawn before 1 June 1996. Permission for the closure was refused.

=== Accidents and incidents ===
During the 'Big Snow of 1982', on 8 January of that year a passenger train became trapped in the snow at Tonfanau, leaving seven people stranded on the train overnight. A helicopter from RAF Valley was sent to rescue them.

== Facilities ==
The station has only basic facilities, including a shelter, a departure screen and a cycle stand. As there are no facilities to purchase tickets, passengers must buy one in advance, or from the guard on the train. The station is due to receive a new help point from Transport for Wales Rail.

== Passenger volume ==
Passenger volume at Tonfanau
	2004–05	2005–06	2006–07	2007–08	2008–09	2009–10	2010–11	2011–12	2012–13	2013–14	2014–15	2015–16	2016–17	2017–18	2018–19	2019–20	2020–21	2021–22	2022–23	2023–24	2024–25
Entries and exits	2,197	868	1,117	1,145	1,352	3,016	2,726	2,150	2,240	2,728	3,258	3,074	2,758	3,292	3,058	2,158	190	1,116	1,556	2,380	2,490

The statistics cover twelve month periods that start in April.

== Services ==
The station is an unstaffed halt, with passenger services to Barmouth, Harlech, Porthmadog and Pwllheli northbound and Tywyn, Aberdovey, Machynlleth and Shrewsbury. Most southbound trains continue through to Birmingham New Street and Birmingham International. Trains stop on request.

Preceding station	National Rail	Following station
Llwyngwril	Transport for Wales; Cambrian Coast Line	Tywyn
	Historical railways	
Llangelynin; Line open, station closed	Cambrian Railways; Aberystwith and Welsh Coast Railway	Towyn; Line and station open

== Bibliography ==
- Caton, Peter (2018). Remote Stations. Leicestershire: Matador. ISBN 978-1-78901-408-2.
- Wills, Dixe (2014). Tiny Stations (Paperback, 1st reprint ed.). Basingstoke: AA Publishing. ISBN 978-0-7495-7732-2.
