= Penychain railway station =

Railway station in Gwynedd, Wales

Penychain
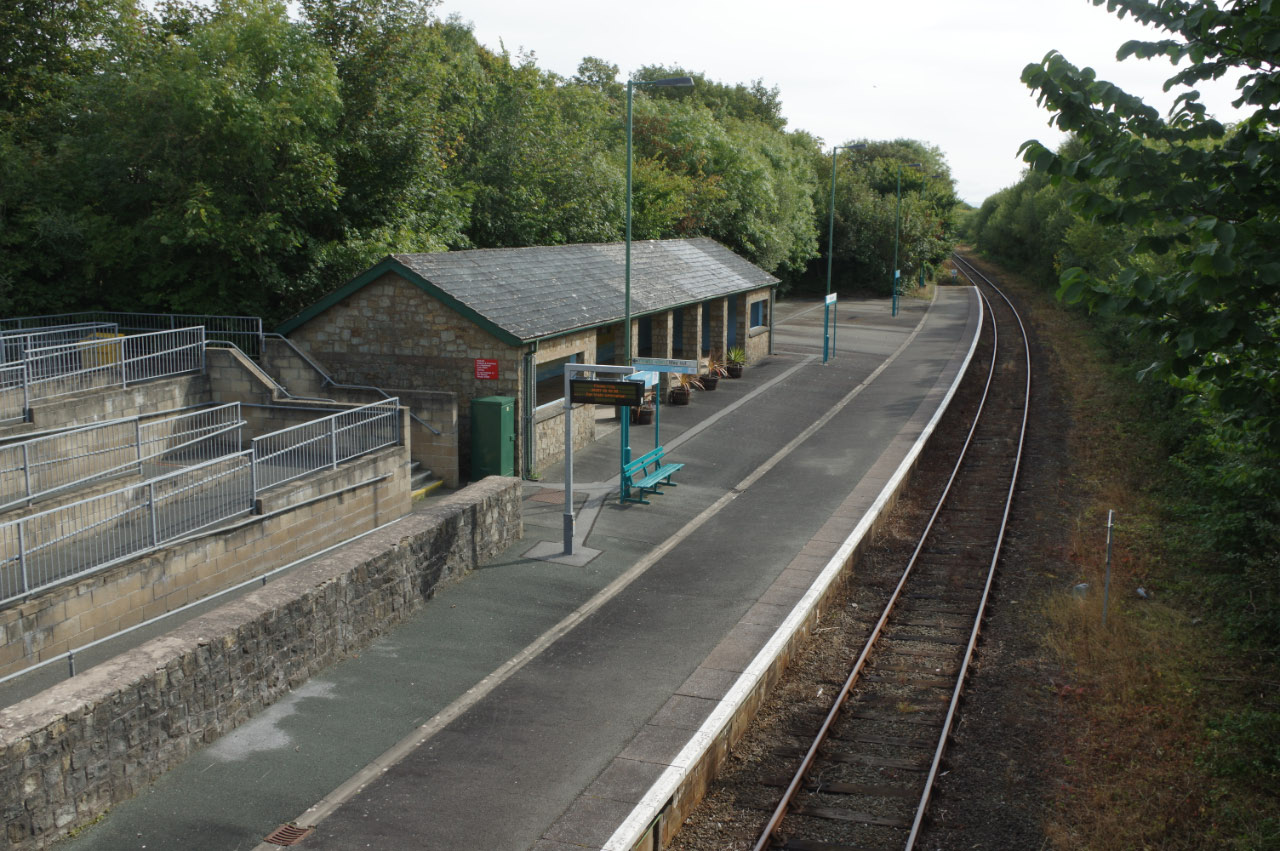
- Penychain station in 2014

General information
- Location: near Chwilog, Gwynedd; Wales
- Coordinates: 52.903°N 4.339°W
- Grid reference: SH428364
- Manager: Transport for Wales
- Platforms: 1

Other information
- Station code: PNC
- Classification: DfT category F2

Key dates
- 31 July 1933: Opened (as Penychain Halt)

Passengers
- 2021/22: ▲2,894
- 2022/23: ▲4,314
- 2023/24: ▲4,818
- 2024/25: ▲8,892
- 2025/26: ▲10,502
Location
Notes
- Passenger statistics from the Office of Rail and Road

Penychain railway station, is located by an over bridge at Pen-ychain on the Llŷn Peninsula in Gwynedd, Wales. For many years the station served the large Butlins Holiday Camp at Penychain. The station is on the Cambrian Line, between Abererch and Criccieth, 129 miles 29 chains (208.2 km) from Whitchurch, measured via Oswestry (the original line diverging at Welshpool).

== History ==
The station opened as Penychain Halt on 31 July 1933. Butlin's built the adjacent camp in 1940 at the request of the Admiralty to serve as HMS Glendower, a Royal Navy training base at Penychain was already used as a Rifle range during WWI. After the end of the war the Butlins camp opened, and the name was changed to Penychain for Pwllheli Holiday Camp on 3 April 1947. The name then changed to Butlins Penychain on 17 May 1993, before reverting to its current name on 18 May 2001.

Between November 2013 and September 2014, services were suspended north of Harlech due to issues with construction of Pont Briwet, near Penrhyndeudraeth. From 1 September to 1 December 2023, engineering work took place to finish restoration of the Barmouth Viaduct. Rail replacement buses served stations from Pwllheli to Machynlleth.

== Facilities ==
There is a large shelter, a bench, and a live departure screen. As there are no facilities to purchase tickets, passengers must buy one in advance, or from the guard on the train.

== Passenger volume ==
Passenger volume at Penychain
	2004–05	2005–06	2006–07	2007–08	2008–09	2009–10	2010–11	2011–12	2012–13	2013–14	2014–15	2015–16	2016–17	2017–18	2018–19	2019–20	2020–21	2021–22	2022–23	2023–24	2024–25
Entries and exits	2,996	2,512	2,719	2,274	1,896	2,446	2,394	3,060	3,252	3,276	1,716	3,430	3,540	4,126	3,554	3,298	640	2,894	4,314	4,818	8,892

The statistics cover twelve month periods that start in April.

== Services ==
Penychain is an unstaffed halt and request stop. There are 8 trains a day, each way to Pwllheli and Machynlleth. A limited service of 5 trains each way operates on Sundays.

Preceding station	National Rail	Following station
Abererch	Transport for Wales; Cambrian Coast Line	Criccieth

== Bibliography ==
- Quick, Michael (2023). Railway Passenger Stations in Great Britain: A Chronology (PDF) (5th ed.). London: Railway and Canal Historical Society.
- Shannon, Paul; Hillmer, John (1999). North Wales (British Railways Past & Present) Part 2. Kettering: Past & Present Publishing Ltd. ISBN 1-85895-163-1. No 36.
