= Llanaber railway station =

Railway station in Gwynedd, Wales

Llanaber
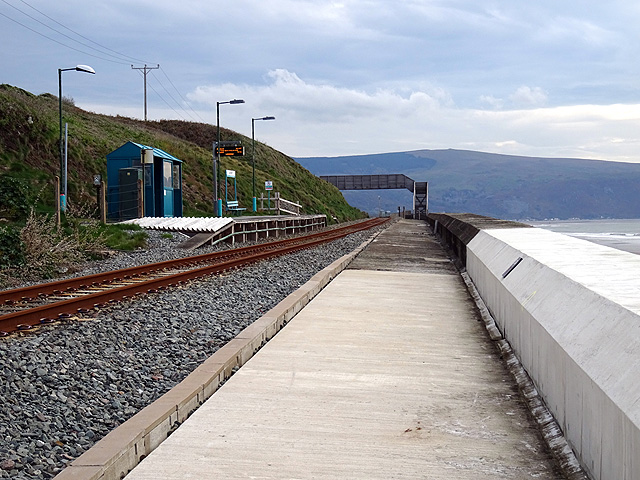
- Llanaber station on 26 October 2015

General information
- Location: Llanaber, Gwynedd; Wales
- Coordinates: 52.742°N 4.077°W
- Grid reference: SH598180
- Manager: Transport for Wales
- Platforms: 1

Other information
- Station code: LLA
- Classification: DfT category F2

History
- Opened: 14 August 1911

Passengers
- 2021/22: ▲620
- 2022/23: ▲1,750
- 2023/24: ▲3,042
- 2024/25: ▲3,844
- 2025/26: ▲5,092
Location
Notes
- Passenger statistics from the Office of Rail and Road

Llanaber railway station serves the village of Llanaber near Barmouth in Gwynedd, Wales. The station is an unstaffed halt on the Cambrian Coast Railway with passenger services to Harlech, Porthmadog, Pwllheli, Barmouth, Machynlleth and Shrewsbury. Most trains call only on request.

The station platform is located on a narrow ledge below the village of Llanaber and immediately above a rocky beach.

From 22 June 2020, trains did not call at the station due to the short platform and the inability to maintain social distancing between passengers and the guard when opening the train door. Restrictions were lifted on 22 August 2021 allowing for the station to reopen to passengers.

== January 2014 storms ==
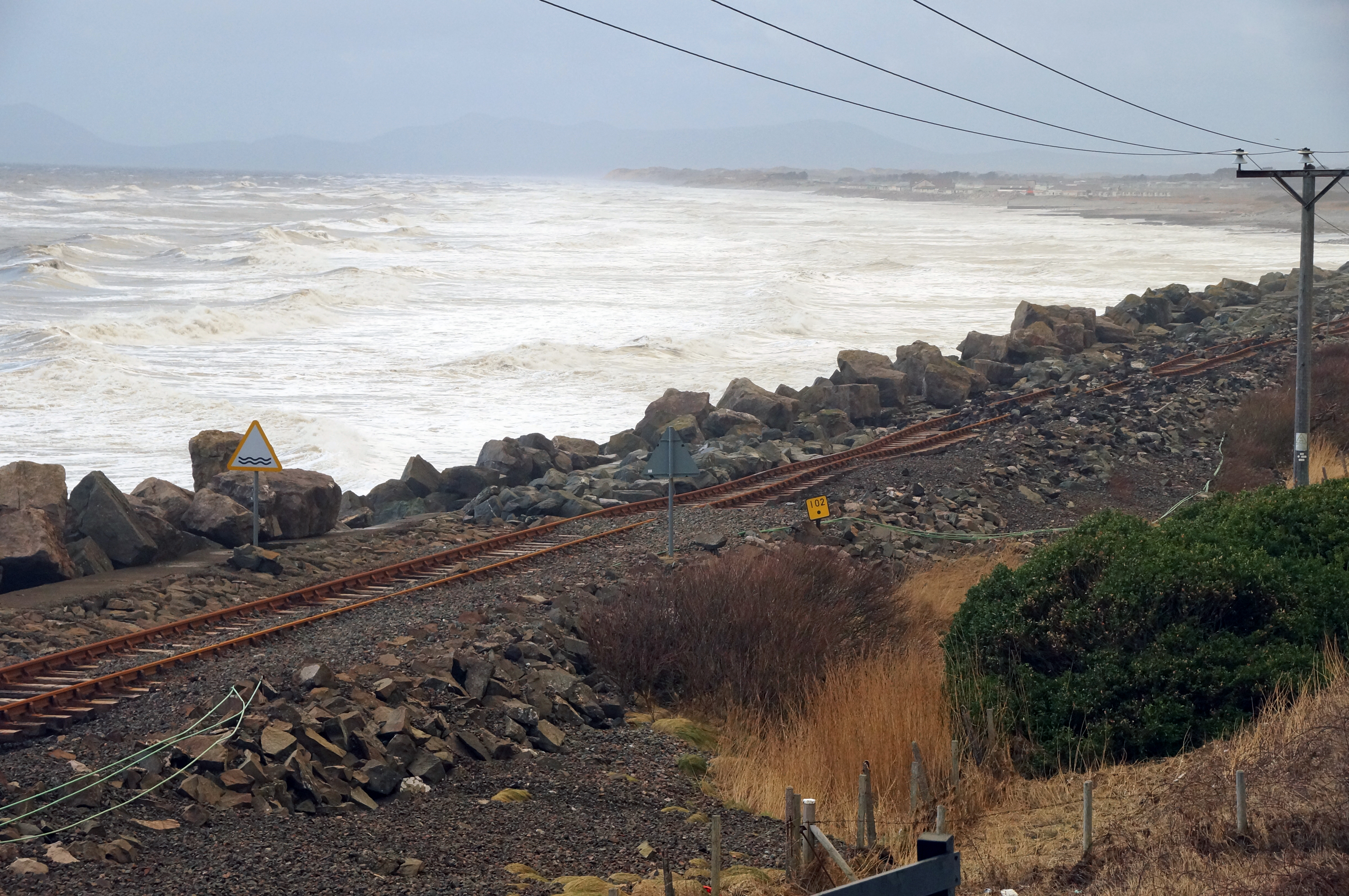
Wave damage caused 3 January 2014, 100m north of the station

On 3 January 2014 wave action washed away 300 tonnes (330 tons) of track bed and deposited 800 tonnes (880 tons) of debris on the line. The line was closed for five months whilst Network Rail engineers repaired the formation and rebuilt the sea wall, with traffic resuming as far as Harlech on 1 May. Through services to Pwllheli remained suspended until 1 September due to rebuilding work on the Pont Briwet viaduct to the north at Penrhyndeudraeth.

| Preceding station | National Rail | Following station |
|---|---|---|
| Talybont | Transport for Wales Cambrian Coast Line | Barmouth |
| | Historical railways | |
| Talybont; Line and station open | Cambrian Railways; Aberystwith and Welsh Coast Railway | Barmouth; Line and station open |
