= Llandecwyn railway station =

Railway station in Gwynedd, Wales

Llandecwyn
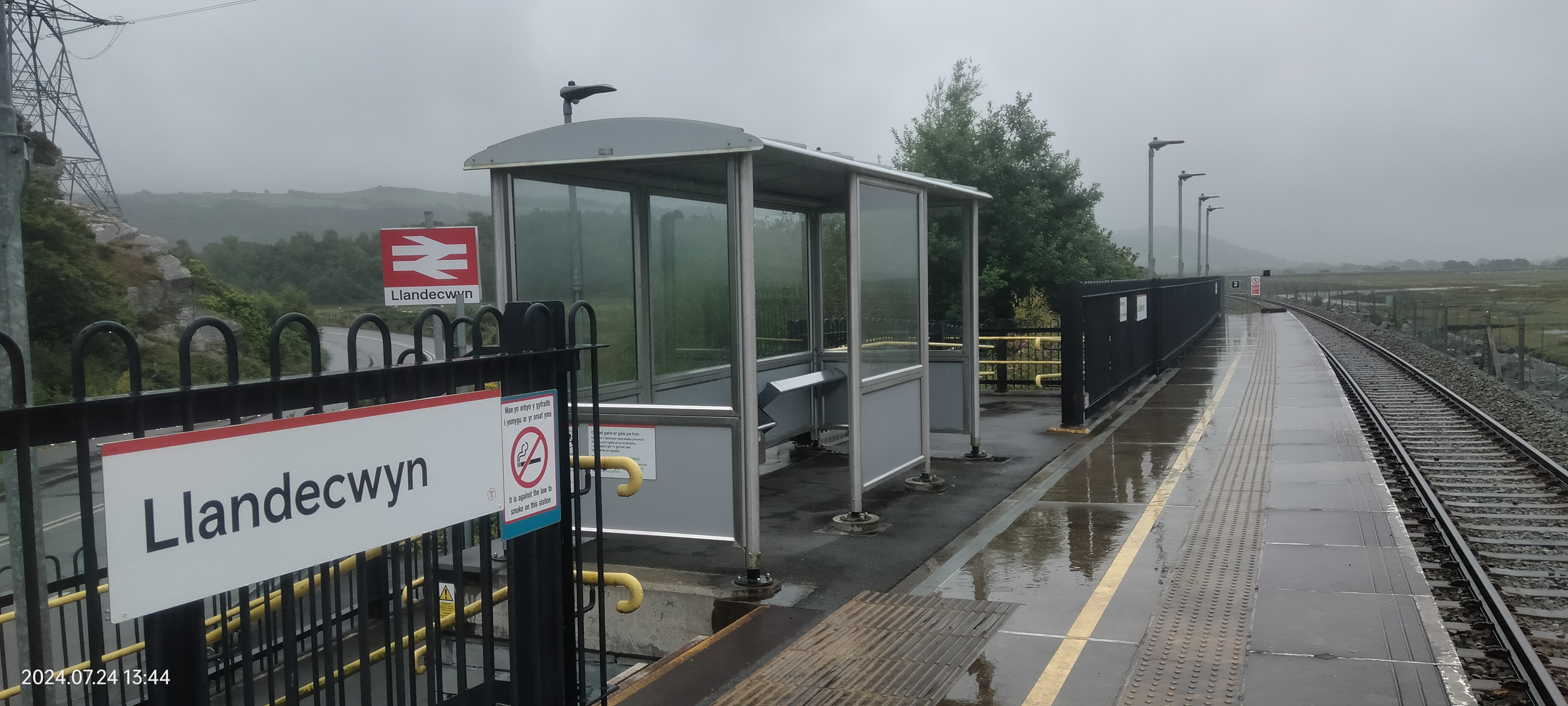

General information
- Location: Llandecwyn, Gwynedd; Wales
- Coordinates: 52.921°N 4.056496°W
- Grid reference: SH618379
- Manager: Transport for Wales
- Platforms: 1

Other information
- Station code: LLC
- Classification: DfT category F2

History
- Opened: 18 November 1935
- Original company: Great Western Railway
- Post-grouping: Great Western Railway

Passengers
- 2021/22: ▲1,302
- 2022/23: ▼1,010
- 2023/24: ▼834
- 2024/25: ▲1,226
- 2025/26: ▲1,404
Location
Notes
- Passenger statistics from the Office of Rail and Road

Llandecwyn railway station serves the rural area around Llandecwyn on the estuary of the Afon Dwyryd in Gwynedd, Wales. It is between Penrhyndeudraeth and Talsarnau on the Cambrian Line, 115 miles 63 chains (186.3 km) from Whitchurch (measured via Oswestry). Transport for Wales operate all services and manage the station. The station is on the Afon Dwyryd estuary, and offers views of Harlech Castle and Ynys Gifftan.

== History ==
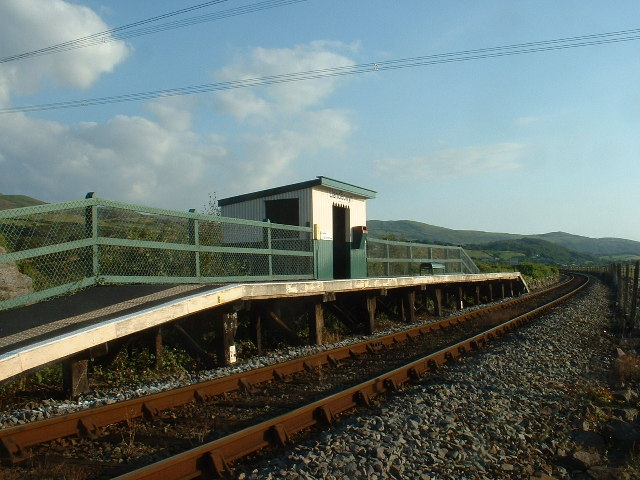
Llandecwyn Station, September 2005

The station opened on 18 November 1935. It was originally opened as Llandecwyn Halt, but the Halt suffix was removed in May 1968.

British Rail requested the permission of the Secretary of State for Transport to close Llandecwyn and three other Cambrian Coast stations (namely Abererch, Tygwyn and Tonfanau) during the mid-1990s. Their winter 1995/96 timetable featured only two northbound and three southbound trains Mondays to Saturdays, with a note that the service may be withdrawn before 1 June 1996. All four however, remained open.

The station was closed from November 2013, as part of the scheme of works to replace nearby Pont Briwet, and was resited and rebuilt upon reopening in September 2014.

== Facilities ==
Since 2014, the station now consists of a small glass shelter and a short concrete platform capable of accommodating two carriages. Station facilities are, like most remote stations, limited, with a bin and live departure screen along with the aforementioned shelter.

== Passenger volume ==
Passenger volume at Llandecwyn
	2004–05	2005–06	2006–07	2007–08	2008–09	2009–10	2010–11	2011–12	2012–13	2013–14	2014–15	2015–16	2016–17	2017–18	2018–19	2019–20	2020–21	2021–22	2022–23	2023–24	2024–25
Entries and exits	1,148	1,534	2,222	1,885	1,474	1,812	1,906	1,418	998	880	1,352	2,370	1,792	1,886	1,700	1,150	104	1,302	1,010	834	1,226

The statistics cover twelve month periods that start in April.

== Services ==
The station is an unstaffed request halt on the Cambrian Coast Railway with passenger services to Pwllheli, Barmouth and Machynlleth. On weekdays and Saturdays there are 8 trains in each direction, giving a service approximately every 2 hours. On Sundays, 5 trains operate in each direction.

Preceding station	National Rail	Following station
Penrhyndeudraeth	Transport for Wales Cambrian Coast Line	Talsarnau
	Historical railways	
Penrhyndeudraeth; Line and station open	Great Western Railway; Aberystwith and Welsh Coast Railway	Talsarnau; Line and station open

== Community rail ==
The station, along with all others on the Cambrian Line, is part of the Cambrian Railway Partnership, a community rail organisation.

== Bibliography ==
- Butt, R. V. J. (October 1995). The Directory of Railway Stations: details every public and private passenger station, halt, platform and stopping place, past and present (1st ed.). Sparkford: Patrick Stephens Ltd. ISBN 978-1-85260-508-7. OCLC 60251199. OL 11956311M.
- Caton, Peter (2018). Remote Stations. Leicestershire: Matador. ISBN 978-1-78901-408-2.
- Jowett, Alan (March 1989). Jowett's Railway Atlas of Great Britain and Ireland: From Pre-Grouping to the Present Day (1st ed.). Sparkford: Patrick Stephens Ltd. ISBN 978-1-85260-086-0. OCLC 22311137.
- Quick, Michael (2023). Railway Passenger Stations in Great Britain: A Chronology (PDF) (5th ed.). London: Railway and Canal Historical Society.
