= Aberdovey railway station =

Railway station serving the village of Aberdyfi in Gwynedd, Wales

Aberdovey Welsh: Aberdyfi
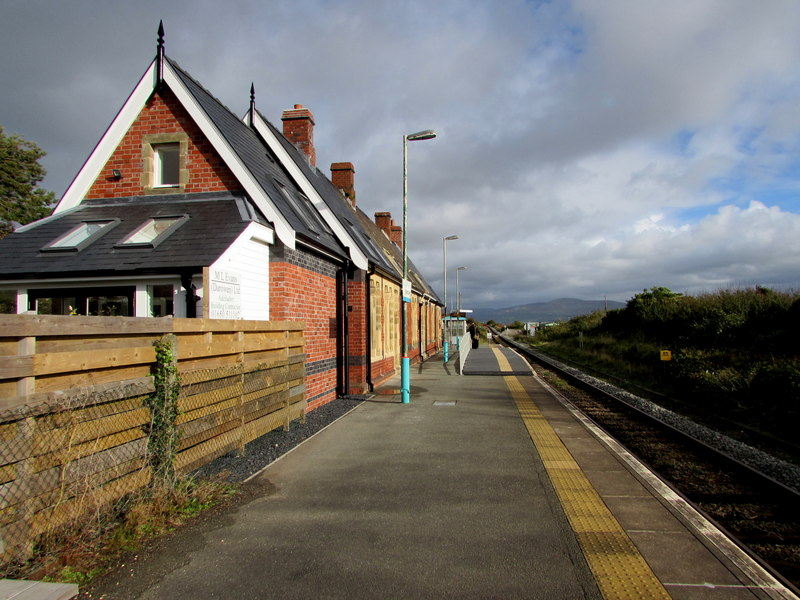

General information
- Location: Aberdyfi, Gwynedd; Wales
- Coordinates: 52.54436°N 4.05638°W
- Grid reference: SN606960
- Manager: Transport for Wales
- Platforms: 1

Other information
- Station code: AVY
- Classification: DfT category F2

History
- Opened: 14 August 1867

Passengers
- 2021/22: ▲22,888
- 2022/23: ▲34,208
- 2023/24: ▲37,538
- 2024/25: ▲49,838
- 2025/26: ▲57,692
Location
Notes
- Passenger statistics from the Office of Rail and Road

Aberdovey railway station (Welsh: Aberdyfi) serves the seaside resort of Aberdyfi in Gwynedd, Wales. The station is on the Cambrian Coast Railway with passenger services every two hours (weekday daytimes) calling at all stations between Machynlleth and Pwllheli, including Tywyn, Barmouth, Harlech and Porthmadog. Passengers can connect at Machynlleth for trains to Aberystwyth or Shrewsbury, Wolverhampton, Birmingham New Street and Birmingham International.

== History ==
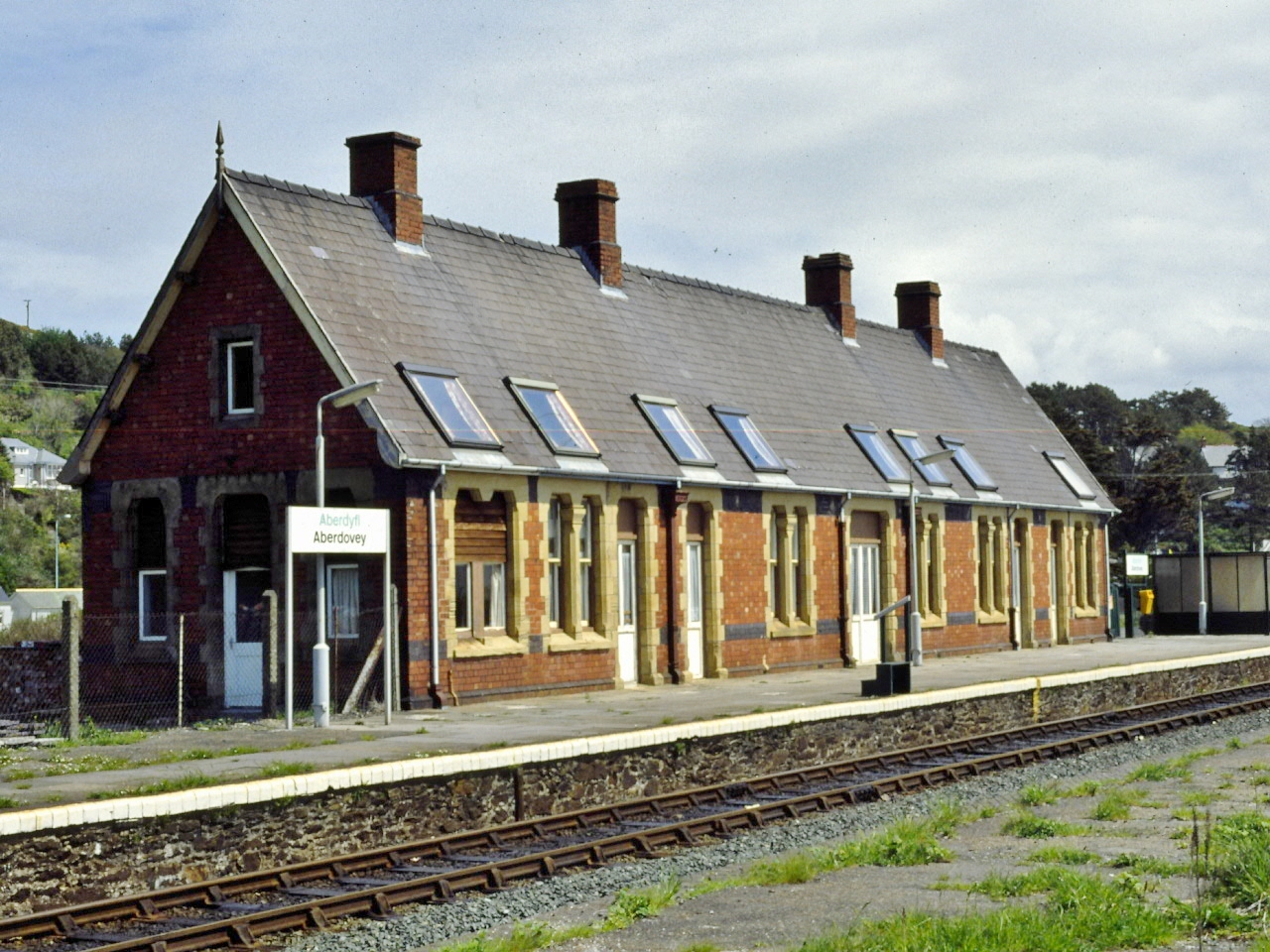
The station building, now a private residence, pictured in August 1986

The first station opened 24 October 1863 near the harbour on a short branch line south of the present station. It closed when the present station was opened in 1867 by the Aberystwith [sic] and Welsh Coast Railway, then run by the Cambrian Railways. It later became part of the Great Western Railway and then passed on to the London Midland Region of British Railways on nationalisation in 1948. When Sectorisation was introduced, the station was served by Regional Railways until the Privatisation of British Railways. Until the 1960s there was a summer service between London Paddington and Pwllheli, via Birmingham Snow Hill, Shrewsbury and Machynlleth.

The original station building is in use as a private residence. It is located next to a static caravan park which is all that lies between the station and the stretch of coastline between Aberdyfi and Tywyn, and next to the Aberdovey Golf Club.

The station was host to a GWR camp coach in 1939. At least one camping coach was positioned here by the Western Region from 1952 to 1962, there were two from 1957 to 1958 and three from 1959 to 1962 when the London Midland Region took over responsibility for the coaches, they had three here from 1963 to 1971.

== Facilities ==
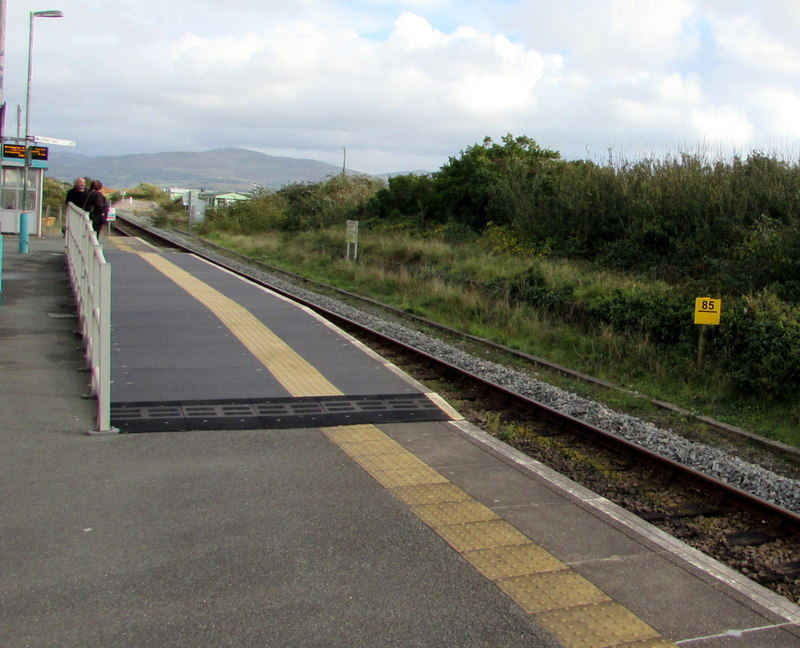
Harrington Hump installed at the station

Originally a two-platform station with a short branch line (only a few hundred yards long) to the harbour, the station is now a single-platform, unstaffed halt. Like many stations in Wales and the North of England, the station was constructed before standard platform heights were established and is very low. Aberdovey was the third UK railway station to receive a specially designed raised section - a Harrington Hump - to improve accessibility for passengers. This was funded by the Welsh Government. There are no ticketing facilities at the station, and there is also no waiting room. There is a free car park with 25 spaces.

== Passenger volume ==
Passenger Volume at Aberdovey
	2019-20	2020-21	2021-22	2022-23
Entries and exits	36,560	5,396	22886	34,208

== Services ==
Transport for Wales run a two-hourly service each way on the Cambrian Coast Line from Machynlleth - where the route connects to the main Cambrian Line - to Pwllheli through Aberdyfi. Most services in the May 2016 timetable run to/from Birmingham International via Shrewsbury.

Preceding station	National Rail	Following station
Tywyn	Transport for Wales; Cambrian Coast Line	Penhelig
	Historical railways	
Towyn; Line and station open	Cambrian Railways; Aberystwith and Welsh Coast Railway	Penhelig; Line and station open
