= Penrhyndeudraeth railway station =

Railway station in Gwynedd, Wales

Penrhyndeudraeth
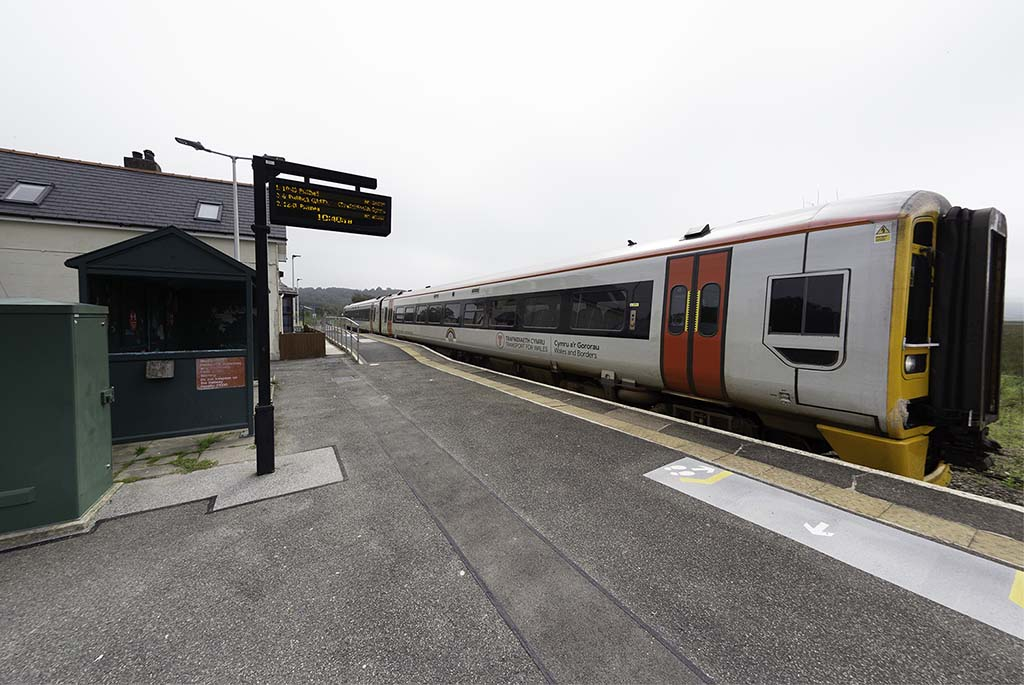

General information
- Location: Penrhyndeudraeth, Gwynedd, Wales
- Coordinates: 52.929°N 4.065°W
- Grid reference: SH613388
- Manager: Transport for Wales
- Platforms: 1

Other information
- Station code: PRH
- Classification: DfT category F2

History
- Original company: Aberystwith and Welsh Coast Railway
- Pre-grouping: Cambrian Railways
- Post-grouping: Great Western Railway

Key dates
- 2 September 1867: Opened

Passengers
- 2021/22: ▲46,290
- 2022/23: ▲56,452
- 2023/24: ▲58,098
- 2024/25: ▲61,622
- 2025/26: ▲62,530
Location
Notes
- Passenger statistics from the Office of Rail and Road

Penrhyndeudraeth railway station serves the small town of Penrhyndeudraeth, on the Dwyryd Estuary, in Gwynedd, Wales. It lies on the Cambrian Coast Railway, with services between Birmingham International, Shrewsbury, Machynlleth and Pwllheli.

== History ==
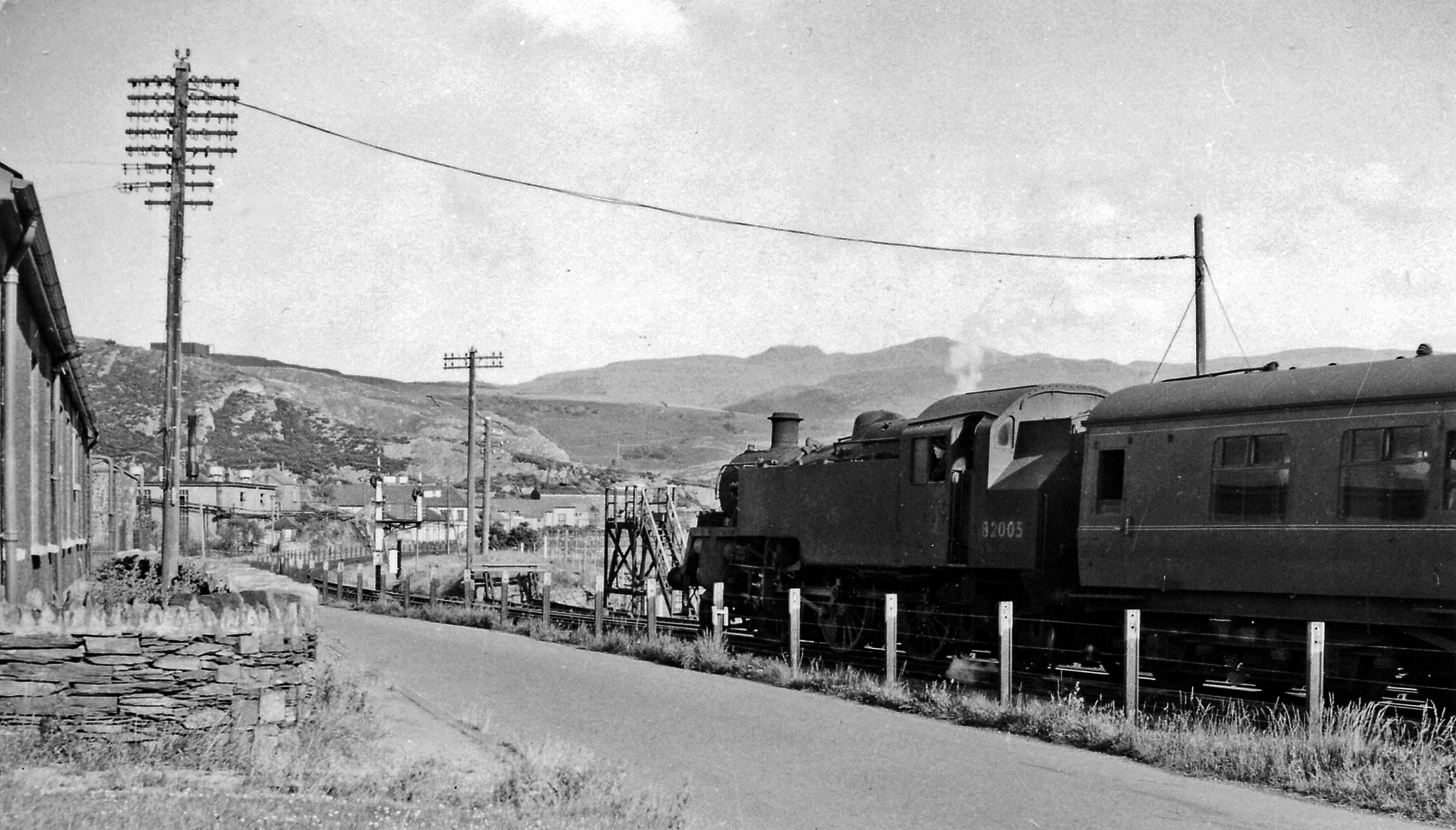
A Pwllheli - Chester train at Penrhyndeudraeth (1964)

The railway line between Machynlleth and Pwllheli was authorised to be built by the Aberystwith and Welsh Coast Railway (A&WCR) on 22 July 1861. During construction, the A&WCR amalgamated with the Cambrian Railways, this being authorised on 5 July 1865 and effective from 5 August 1866. The section between Barmouth and Afon Wen opened on 2 September 1867; Penrhyndeudraeth was opened on the same day.

In 2016, the Welsh Government funded the installation of a reinforced glass fibre Harrington Hump on the platform to improve access for wheelchair and pushchair users onto and off trains.

== Services ==
Transport for Wales operates services between Pwllheli and Machynlleth that call at Penrhyndeudraeth approximately once every two hours, with most continuing on to Birmingham International, via Shrewsbury.

Preceding station	National Rail	Following station
Minffordd	Transport for Wales Cambrian Coast Line	Llandecwyn
	Historical railways	
Minffordd; Line and station open	Cambrian Railways; Aberystwith and Welsh Coast Railway	Llandecwyn; Line and station open
