= Tygwyn railway station =

Railway station in Gwynedd, Wales

Tygwyn
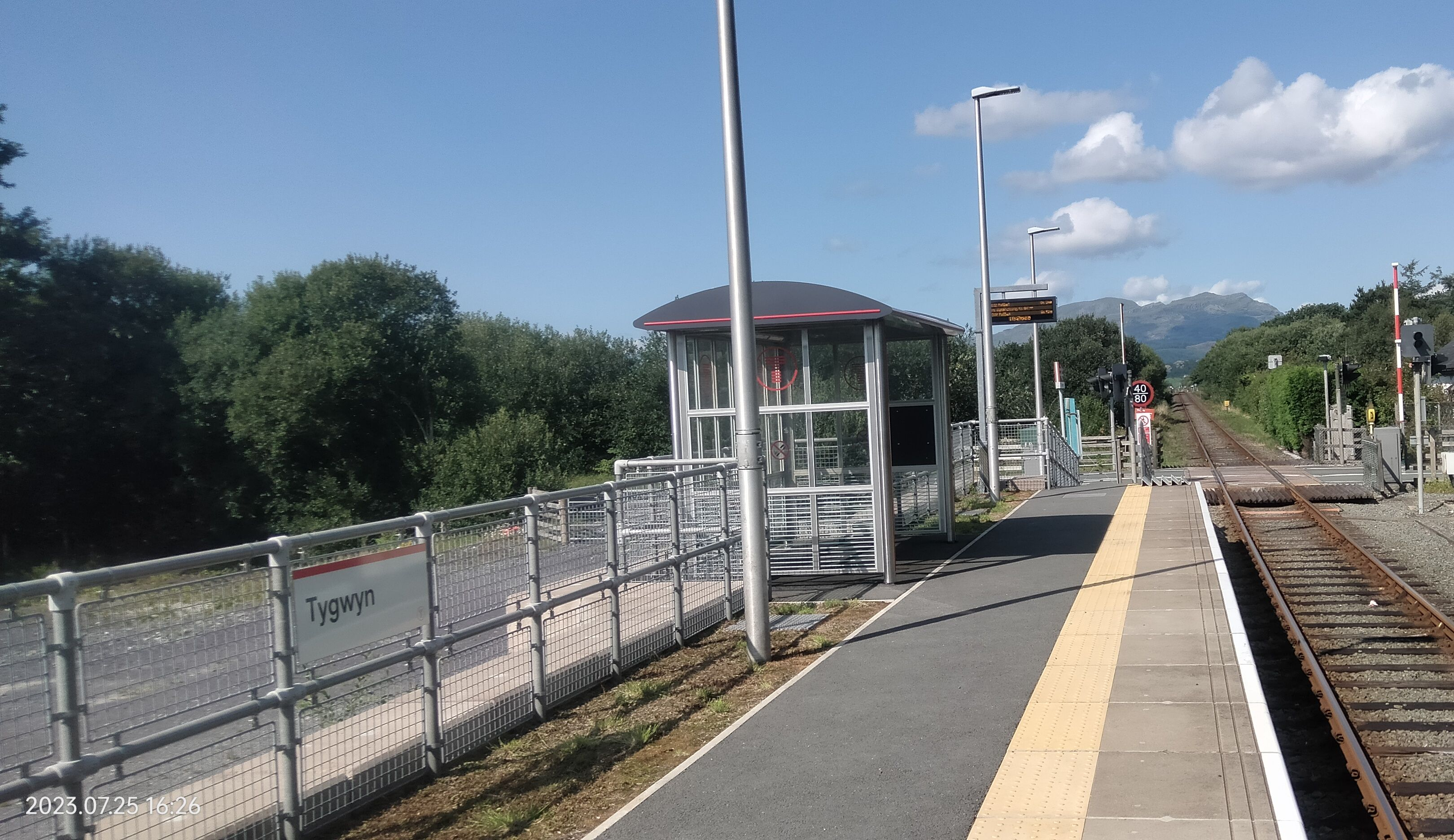
- View of the Platform at Tygywn, July 2023

General information
- Location: Glan-y-wern, Gwynedd; Wales
- Coordinates: 52.893728°N 4.078597°W
- Grid reference: SH602349
- Manager: Transport for Wales
- Platforms: 1

Other information
- Station code: TYG
- Classification: DfT category F2

History
- Original company: Great Western Railway
- Post-grouping: Great Western Railway

Key dates
- 11 July 1927: opened

Passengers
- 2021/22: ▲224
- 2022/23: ▲1,052
- 2023/24: ▼986
- 2024/25: ▲1,092
- 2025/26: ▲1,402
Location
Notes
- Passenger statistics from the Office of Rail and Road

Tygwyn railway station is located at a level crossing on the A496 between Harlech and Talsarnau near the estuary of the Afon Dwyryd in Gwynedd, Wales.

== History ==
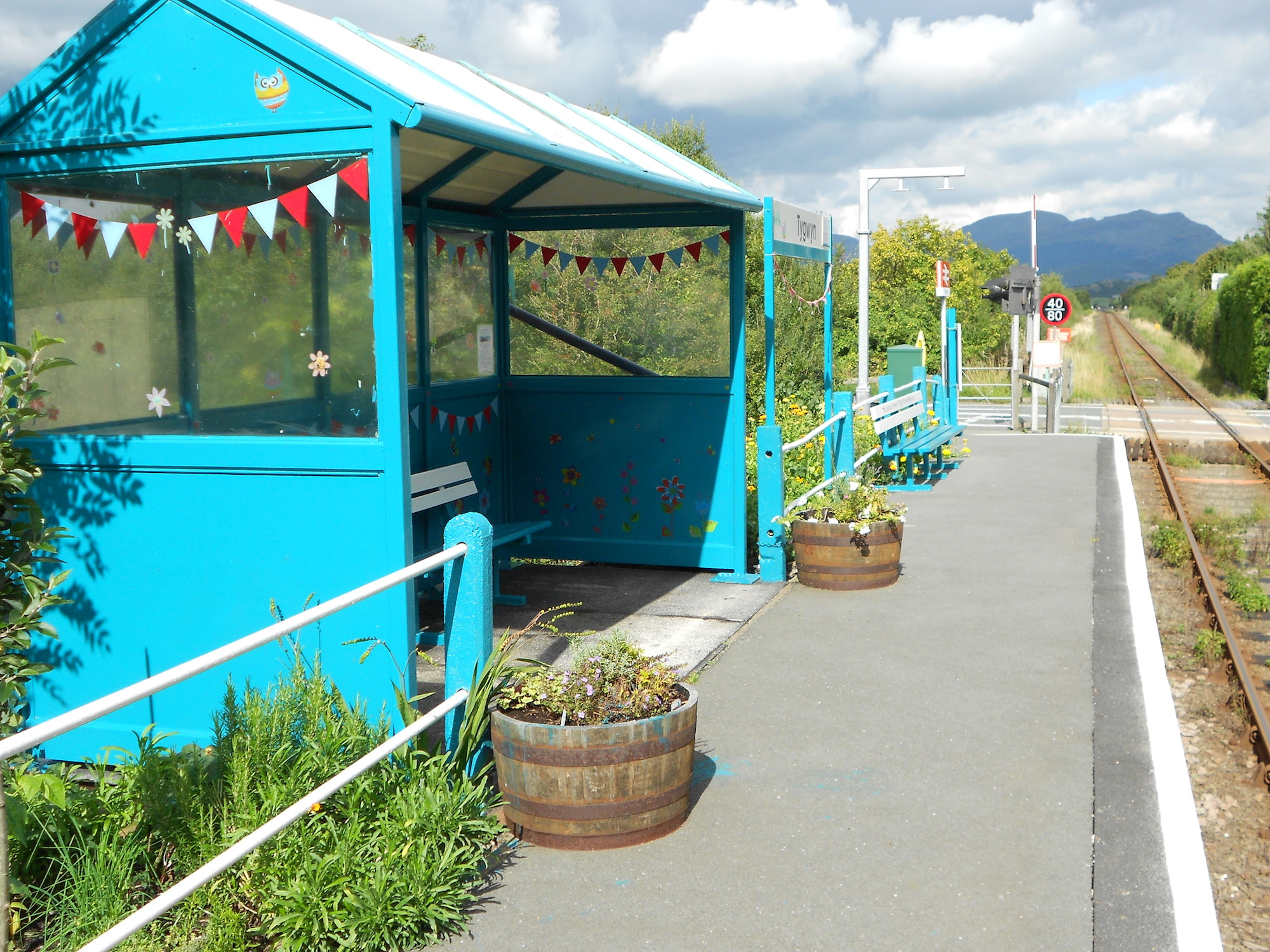
The results of "station adoption" by the local community, seen here in 2013

British Rail requested the permission of the Secretary of State for Transport to close Tygwyn and three other Cambrian Coast stations (namely Abererch, Llandecwyn and Tonfanau) during the mid-1990s. Their winter 1995/96 timetable featured only two northbound and three southbound trains Mondays to Saturdays, with a note that the service may be withdrawn before 1 June 1996. The closure plans were eventually dropped and the station remains open today with a much improved service (all but one northbound train is scheduled to call (on request) in the summer 2016 timetable).

== Services ==
The station remains as an unstaffed halt on the Cambrian Coast Railway with passenger services to Porthmadog, Pwllheli, Barmouth, Machynlleth and Shrewsbury. Most trains call only on request. Trains arrive roughly every two hours.

On Mondays to Fridays, there are:

- 8 trains to Pwllheli.
- 6 trains to Birmingham International.
- 1 train to Shrewsbury.
- 1 train to Machynlleth.

On Saturdays, there are:

- 8 trains to Pwllheli.
- 5 trains to Birmingham International.
- 1 train to Shrewsbury.
- 1 train to Birmingham New Street.
- 1 train to Machynlleth.

On summer Sundays, there are three departures in each direction. This drops to just one departure each way in the winter.

Preceding station	National Rail	Following station
Talsarnau	Transport for Wales Cambrian Coast Line	Harlech
	Historical railways	
Talsarnau; Line and station open	Great Western Railway; Aberystwith and Welsh Coast Railway	Harlech; Line and station open
