= Abererch railway station =

Railway station in Gwynedd, Wales

Abererch
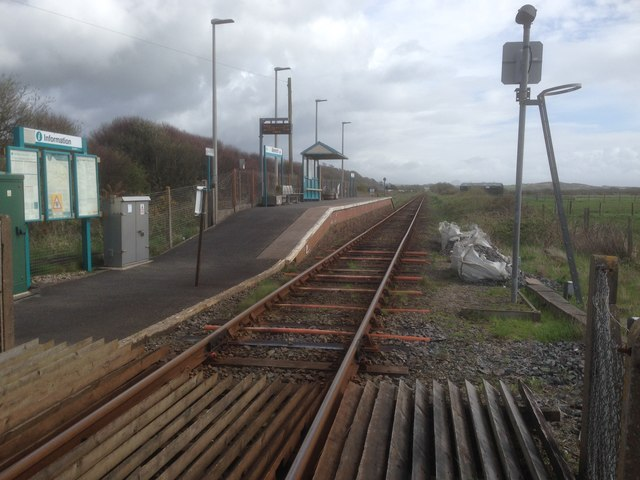

General information
- Location: Abererch, Gwynedd; Wales
- Coordinates: 52.898°N 4.375°W
- Grid reference: SH403360
- Manager: Transport for Wales
- Platforms: 1

Other information
- Station code: ABH
- Classification: DfT category F2

History
- Original company: Aberystwith and Welsh Coast Railway
- Pre-grouping: Cambrian Railways
- Post-grouping: Great Western Railway

Key dates
- 10 October 1867: Station opens
- 1 May 1956: Renamed Abererch Halt
- 6 May 1968: Renamed Abererch

Passengers
- 2021/22: ▲396
- 2022/23: ▲2,040
- 2023/24: ▲2,306
- 2024/25: ▲3,552
- 2025/26: ▲3,692
Location
Notes
- Passenger statistics from the Office of Rail and Road

Abererch railway station is located at a level crossing on the minor road from the beach to the village of Abererch on the Llŷn Peninsula in Gwynedd, Wales.

== History ==
Opened by the Aberystwith and Welsh Coast Railway, then run by the Cambrian Railways, it became part of the Great Western Railway. The line then passed on to the London Midland Region of British Railways on nationalisation in 1948. When Sectorisation was introduced, the station was served by Regional Railways until the Privatisation of British Railways.

It was upgraded in 1933 to station status but in 1956 reverted to an unstaffed halt. The station was host to a GWR camp coach from 1936 to 1939. From 1952 to 1964 there was a British Railways camping coach located in the small siding on the northern side of the railway line; on the right-hand (west) side of the level-crossing when approaching the beach. The single-carriage Camping Coach was usually only located here during the summer months and would be rented out to families for holidaying purposes. Timber access stairways were provided to the coach from the side away from the railway line as there was no permanent platform associated with this siding.

Abererch Halt, as it was referred to, did possess a timber constructed 'Waiting Room' up to the mid-1960s but this was destroyed by fire one evening when the felted roof (allegedly) caught fire from the hot-ashes discharged by a passing steam-hauled train. Other incidents witnessed at the station include severe damage to the railway crossing gates by locomotives when the gates had been left 'open' to vehicular traffic - usually overnight.

There used to be a crossing-keeper's cottage on the northern side of the railway line. The crossing-keeper would open and close the level-crossing gates between each train; principally to let holiday makers to/from the sandy Abererch beach and the adjacent caravan/camping site. The single-storey cottage was externally slate-clad throughout and was situated on the left-hand (east) side when approaching the beach from the A497 Pwllheli - Porthmadog road.

British Rail requested the permission of the Secretary of State for Transport to close Abererch and three other Cambrian Coast stations (namely Llandecwyn, Tygwyn and Tonfanau) during the mid-1990s. Their winter 1995/96 timetable featured only two northbound and three southbound trains Mondays to Saturdays, with a note that the service may be withdrawn before 1 June 1996. The station was retained and service levels have since increased.

During the COVID-19 pandemic trains stopped calling at the station due to the short platform and the inability to maintain social distancing between passengers and the guard when opening the train door. This meant that, in the Office of Rail and Road's statistics, it became one of Britain's least used stations, recording 0 passengers in the year 2020-21.

== Passenger volume ==
Passenger Volume at Abererch
	2019-20	2020-21	2021-22	2022-23
Entries and exits	2,148	0	396	2,040

== Services ==
This railway station is an unstaffed halt on the Cambrian Coast Railway with passenger services every 2 hours (Mon-Sat) calling at all stations between Machynlleth and Pwllheli, including Tywyn, Barmouth, Harlech and Porthmadog. Passengers can connect at Machynlleth for trains to Aberystwyth, Shrewsbury and Birmingham New Street. Sunday service from here is limited with 5 trains in each direction. Trains only stop at Abererch by request.

Preceding station	National Rail	Following station
Pwllheli	Transport for Wales; Cambrian Coast Line	Penychain
	Historical railways	
Pwllheli; Line and station open	Cambrian Railways; Aberystwith and Welsh Coast Railway	Afon Wen; Line open; station closed
