= Tywyn railway station =

Railway station in Gwynedd, Wales

Tywyn
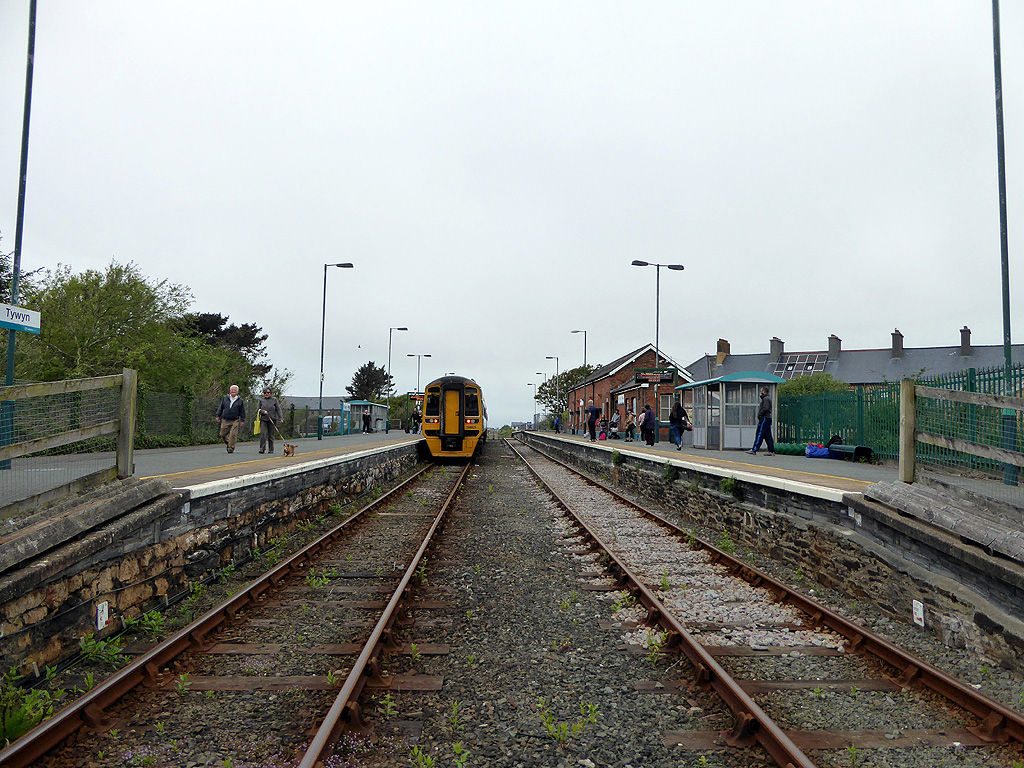

General information
- Location: Tywyn, Gwynedd; Wales
- Coordinates: 52.5854°N 4.0937°W
- Grid reference: SH582006
- Managed by: Transport for Wales
- Platforms: 2

Other information
- Station code: TYW
- Classification: DfT category F1

History
- Original company: Aberystwith and Welsh Coast Railway
- Pre-grouping: Cambrian Railways
- Post-grouping: Great Western Railway

Key dates
- 24 October 1863: Opened as Towyn
- 5 May 1975: Renamed Tywyn

Passengers
- 2020/21: ▼18,204
- 2021/22: ▲58,560
- 2022/23: ▲89,906
- 2023/24: ▲97,184
- 2024/25: ▲0.134 million
Location
Notes
- Passenger statistics from the Office of Rail and Road

Tywyn railway station serves the town of Tywyn in Gwynedd, Wales. The station is on the Cambrian Coast Line, with passenger services to Barmouth, Harlech, Porthmadog, Pwllheli, Aberdovey, Machynlleth and Shrewsbury.

== History ==
The line was built by the Aberystwith and Welsh Coast Railway in 1863 and became incorporated in the Cambrian Railways in 1867. Upon the line opening a temporary station was located adjacent to Neptune Road bridge until the present permanent station was completed a few years later. The Welsh romantic poet John Ceiriog Hughes was stationmaster at Tywyn for a brief period in 1870.

In 1922 Cambrian Railways became part of the Great Western Railway and in 1948 following nationalisation operation of the station passed to British Railways Western Region. Until the 1960s there was a summer service between London Paddington and Pwllheli, via Birmingham Snow Hill, Shrewsbury and Machynlleth.

Unlike most stations on the Cambrian Line, Tywyn has retained two platforms and a passing loop. The station however is unstaffed, and the original station buildings remained derelict from the 1980s until the mid-2000s when they were refurbished as offices. In 2013 the building on the up side was in use as a Spiritualist Church.

== Facilities ==
There are no staff at Tywyn, but there are Help Points, announcements and departure boards. There is also a small car park with 20 spaces and a bike rack with six spaces. There are no ticketing facilities either.

== Services ==
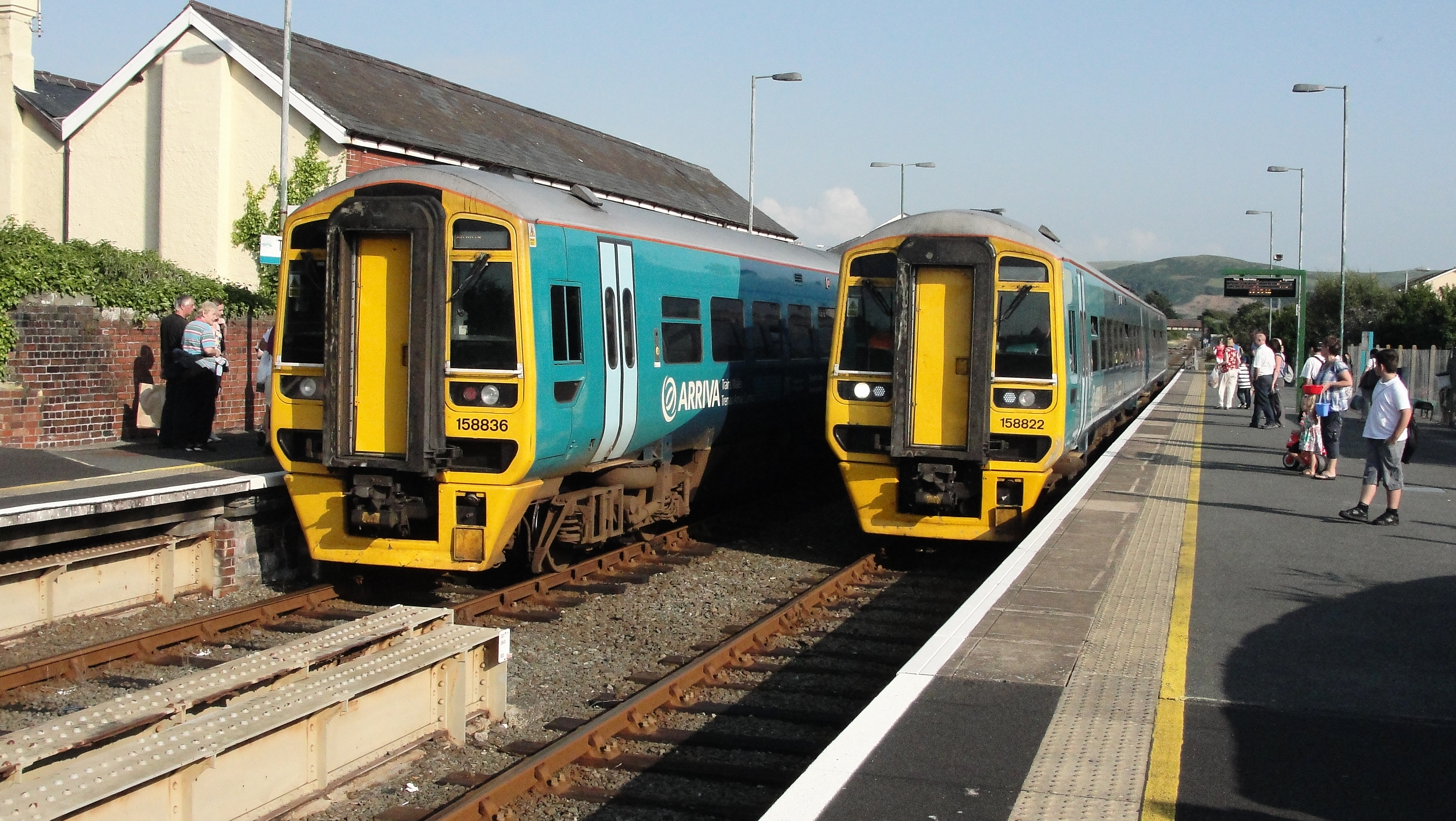
Two Class 158s pass at Tywyn station, Wales 21/08/2013

As the area was a test bed for the new ERTMS signalling system, services are exclusively operated by Class 158 DMUs; these are the only units operated by Transport for Wales currently equipped for ERTMS operation. On weekdays services are approximately every two hours each way, with most running through to/from Birmingham International via Shrewsbury and Birmingham New Street.

The Talyllyn Railway runs from Tywyn to Abergynolwyn and Nant Gwernol. These services operate from Tywyn Wharf station, which is approximately 300 metres (330 yd) southwards down the road running parallel to the Cambrian line.

Preceding station	National Rail	Following station
Tonfanau	Transport for Wales; Cambrian Coast Line	Aberdovey
Heritage railways
Change here for the Talyllyn Railway at Tywyn Wharf
Historical railways
Tonfanau; Line and station open	Cambrian Railways; Aberystwith and Welsh Coast Railway	Aberdovey; Line and station open
