= Birmingham International =

Birmingham International may refer to:

- Birmingham Airport, formerly known as Birmingham International Airport in Birmingham, England
- Birmingham International railway station, in Birmingham, England
- Birmingham–Shuttlesworth International Airport, in Birmingham, Alabama
- Birmingham International Carnival, a biennial event in Birmingham, England
- Birmingham International Raceway, a former race track in Birmingham, Alabama
- Birmingham International Holdings, company
