= Ynys Gifftan =

Tidal island near Talsarnau, Wales

Coordinates: 52°54.75′N 4°4.93′W

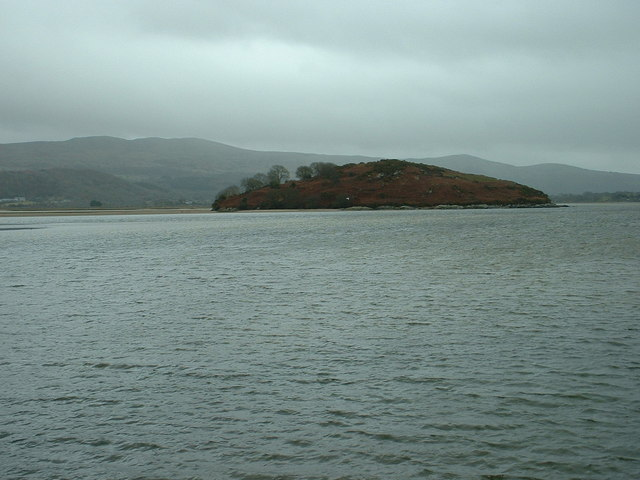
Ynys Gifftan

Ynys Gifftan is an island near the south east shore of Traeth Bach, the Dwyryd estuary near Portmeirion in Gwynedd, north Wales. There is a public footpath to it across the estuary marked on Ordnance Survey maps but has no definable marks that make it obvious; it can be reached on foot at low tide and is 38 metres (125 ft) high. Although there is a footpath to the island, the island itself is private property and trespassing is not advised. The island has been uninhabited since the mid-1960s and the island's single cottage is in a state of disrepair. It is one of 43 (unbridged) tidal islands which may be reached on foot from the mainland of Great Britain.

In February 2026 the island was offered for sale. It has since been removed from the open market
