= Barmouth railway station =

Railway station in Gwynedd, Wales

Barmouth Welsh: Y Bermo
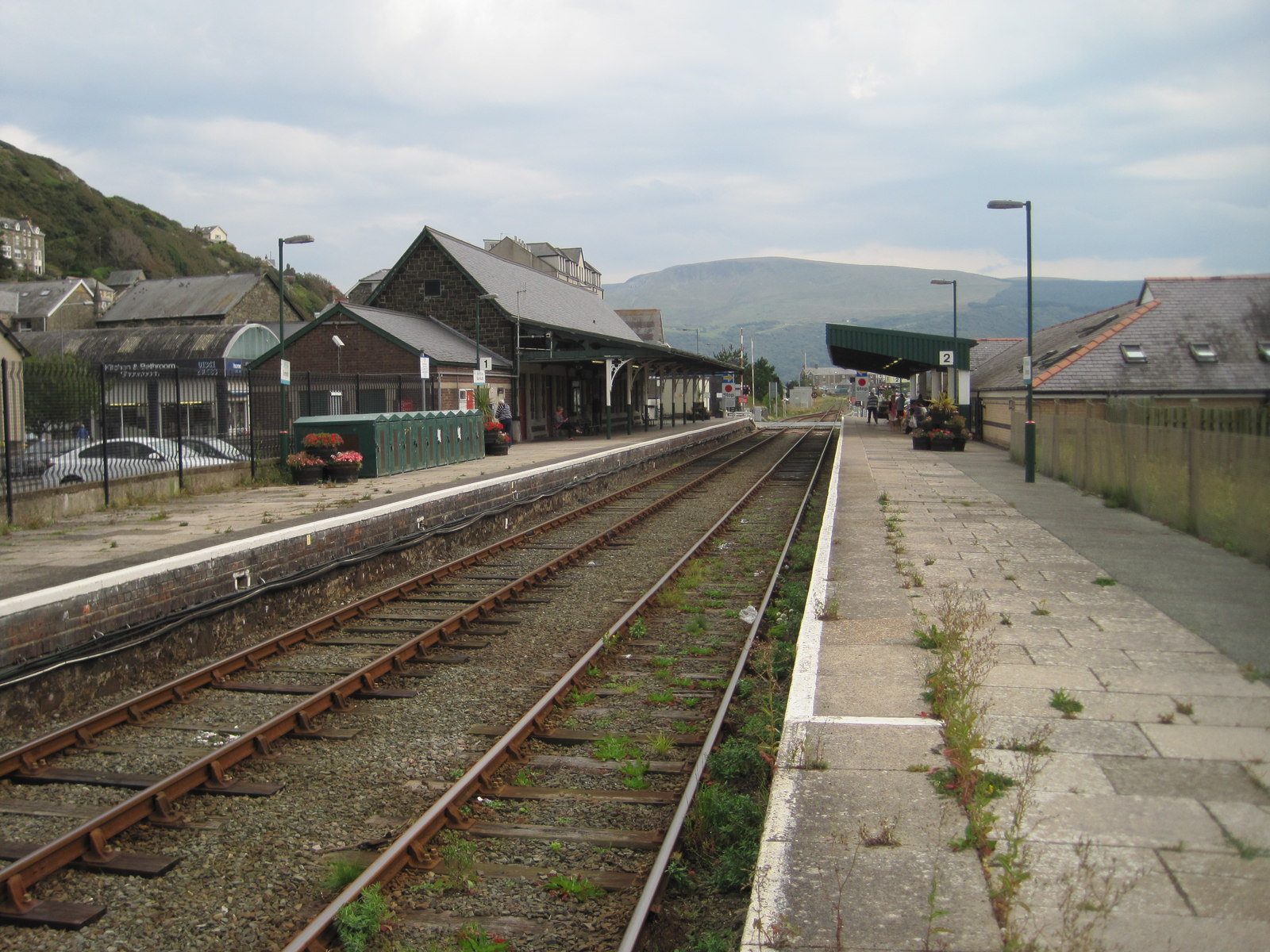

General information
- Location: Barmouth, Gwynedd; Wales
- Coordinates: 52.723°N 4.057°W
- Grid reference: SH612158
- Manager: Transport for Wales
- Platforms: 2

Other information
- Station code: BRM
- Classification: DfT category E

History
- Opened: 5 June 1867

Passengers
- 2020/21: ▼52,848
- 2021/22: ▲0.125 million
- 2022/23: ▲0.170 million
- 2023/24: ▲0.178 million
- 2024/25: ▲0.237 million
Location
Notes
- Passenger statistics from the Office of Rail and Road

Barmouth railway station (Welsh: Y Bermo) serves the seaside town of Barmouth in Gwynedd, Wales. The station is on the Cambrian Coast Railway with passenger services northbound to Pwllheli and southbound to Machynlleth and Shrewsbury. To the south of the station, the railway crosses the Afon Mawddach on the Barmouth Bridge. The location is between Morfa Mawddach and Llanaber, 100 miles 50 chains (161.9 km) from Whitchurch, measured via Oswestry. Transport for Wales manage the station and provide all services.

== History ==
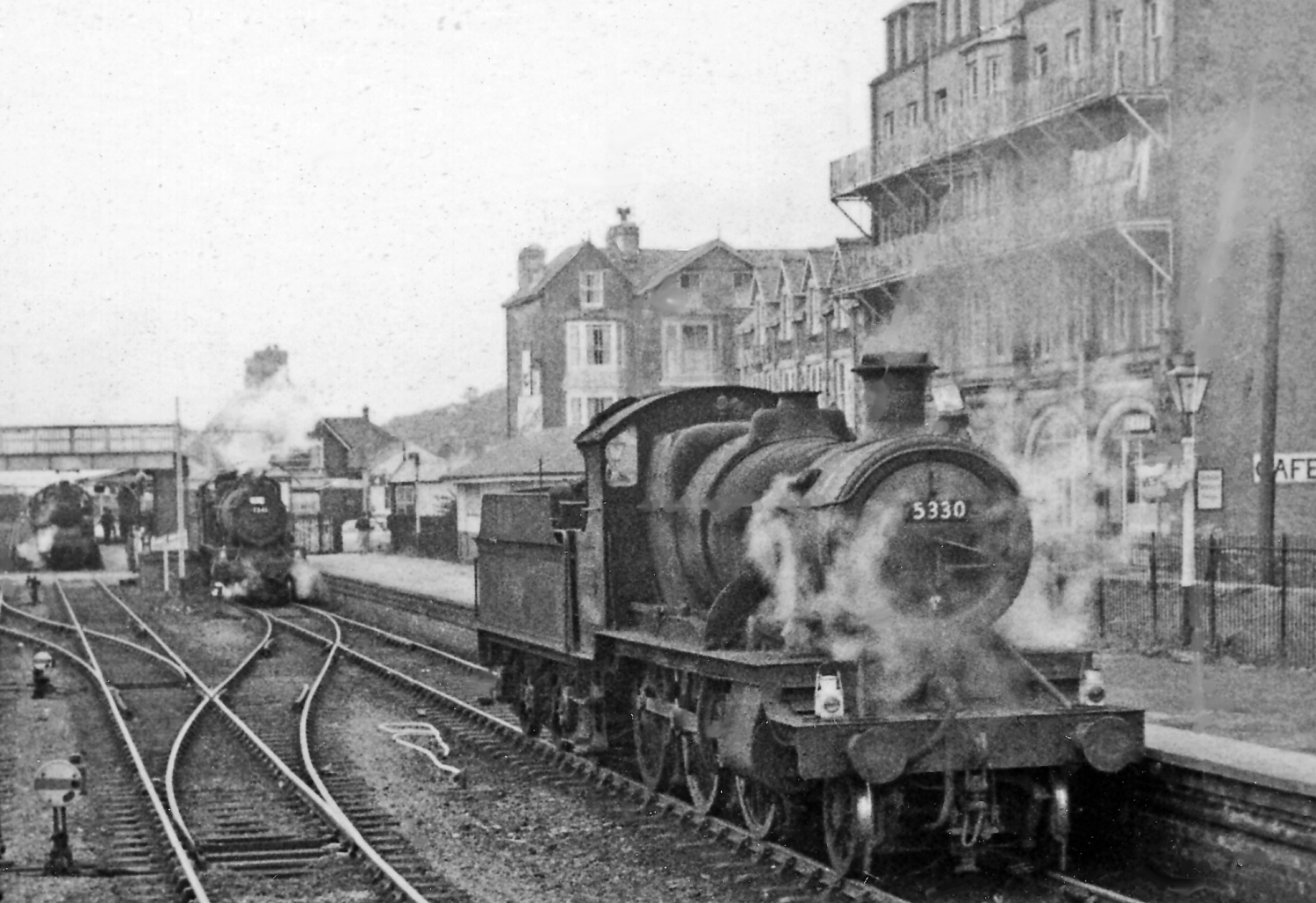
The view in 1962 looking north, with the current station in the distance, and the now-closed Ruabon platform in the foreground

The station, opened on 5 June 1867, originally extended further south, with a platform for trains to Dolgellau and Ruabon on the south side of the level crossing. This platform became disused following the closure of the Dolgellau line in 1965, but remained in situ with its waiting room until the early 1990s. The station was resited to its current location on 7 May 1873.

The station signal box, also on the south side of the level crossing, became disused in the 1980s as the Cambrian Line's traditional signalling system was replaced with radio signalling (RETB). After lying derelict for several years, it was moved to Glyndyfrdwy on the preserved Llangollen Railway.

=== 2014 storm damage ===
From 3 January 2014, train services were suspended due to major infrastructure damage at several locations along the line caused by storm-force winds and the resultant tidal surges. Part of the sea wall to the north near Llanaber was swept away, leading to severe damage to the formation which closed the line for 5 months, whilst further south a section of embankment at Tonfannau was washed out. Network Rail restored service to Barmouth from the south on 10 February 2014, and the line as far north as Harlech in May the same year. The northern end of the route beyond Harlech remained closed until 1 September 2014 due to the reconstruction of the Pont Briwet viaduct.

== Facilities ==
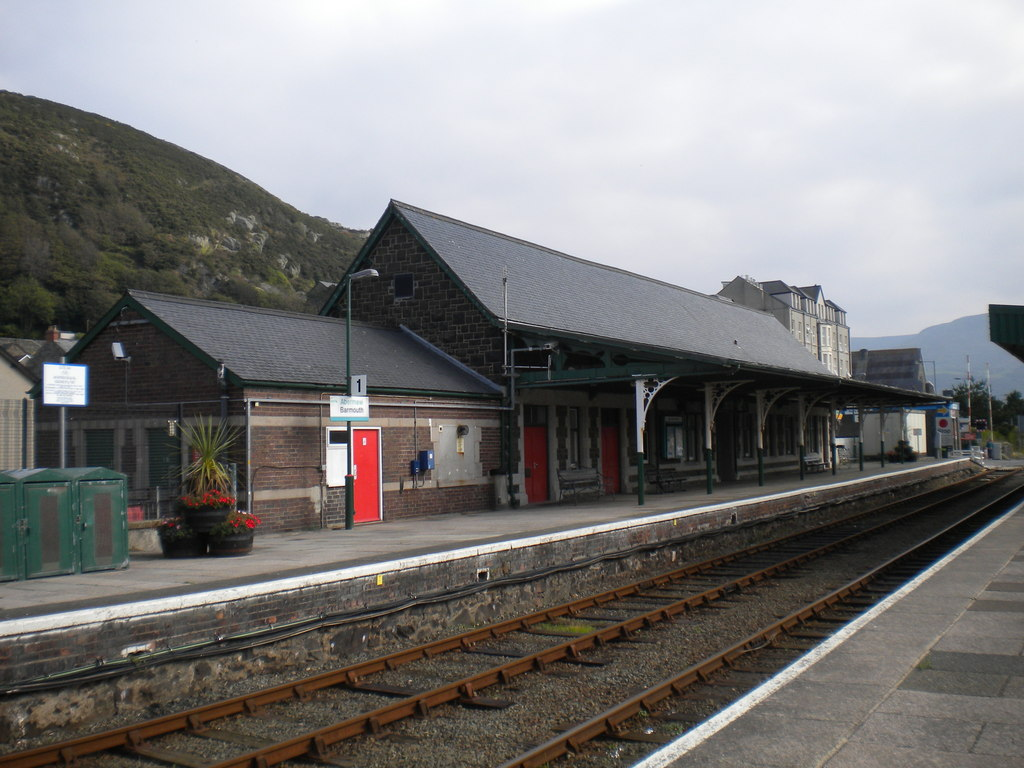
The main station building seen in 2015

The southbound platform was improved in 2003 and is now home to Barmouth's tourist information centre. The station has a staffed ticket office, independently operated for many years, and the tourist information centre provides a travel information service and gift shop. There are no toilets within the station building. There are help points, ticket machines and cycle storage.

== Passenger volume ==
Passenger volume at Barmouth
	2004–05	2005–06	2006–07	2007–08	2008–09	2009–10	2010–11	2011–12	2012–13	2013–14	2014–15	2015–16	2016–17	2017–18	2018–19	2019–20	2020–21	2021–22	2022–23	2023–24	2024–25
Entries and exits	162,219	159,750	127,982	139,844	144,686	156,570	167,268	173,762	167,324	150,288	173,272	191,802	185,586	186,824	197,922	195,644	52,848	124,896	170,358	177,776	236,854

The statistics cover twelve month periods that start in April.

== Services ==
Trains operate every two hours in each direction, southbound to Machynlleth, Shrewsbury & Birmingham International and northbound to Pwllheli (a limited number also originate or terminate here). On Sundays, there are a few services each way, with extra trains in the summer. All services at Barmouth are provided by Transport for Wales using its Class 158 DMUs.

Preceding station	National Rail	Following station
Llanaber	Transport for Wales; Cambrian Coast Line	Morfa Mawddach
	Historical railways	
Llanaber; Line and station open	Cambrian Railways; Aberystwith and Welsh Coast Railway	Barmouth Junction; Line and station open

== Community rail ==
The station, along with all others on the Cambrian Line, is part of the Cambrian Railway Partnership, a community rail organisation.

== Bibliography ==
- Marshall, Geoff; Pipe, Vicki (2018). The Railway Adventures: Places, Trains, People and Stations. September Publishing. ISBN 978-1910463871.
- Mitchell, Vic; Smith, Keith (2010). Ruabon to Barmouth. West Sussex: Middleton Press. figs. 117-120. ISBN 9781906008840. OCLC 651922152.
- Quick, Michael (2023). Railway Passenger Stations in Great Britain: A Chronology (PDF) (5th ed.). London: Railway and Canal Historical Society.
