= Pont Briwet =

Road and railway bridges in Gwynedd, North Wales

Pont Briwet (1)
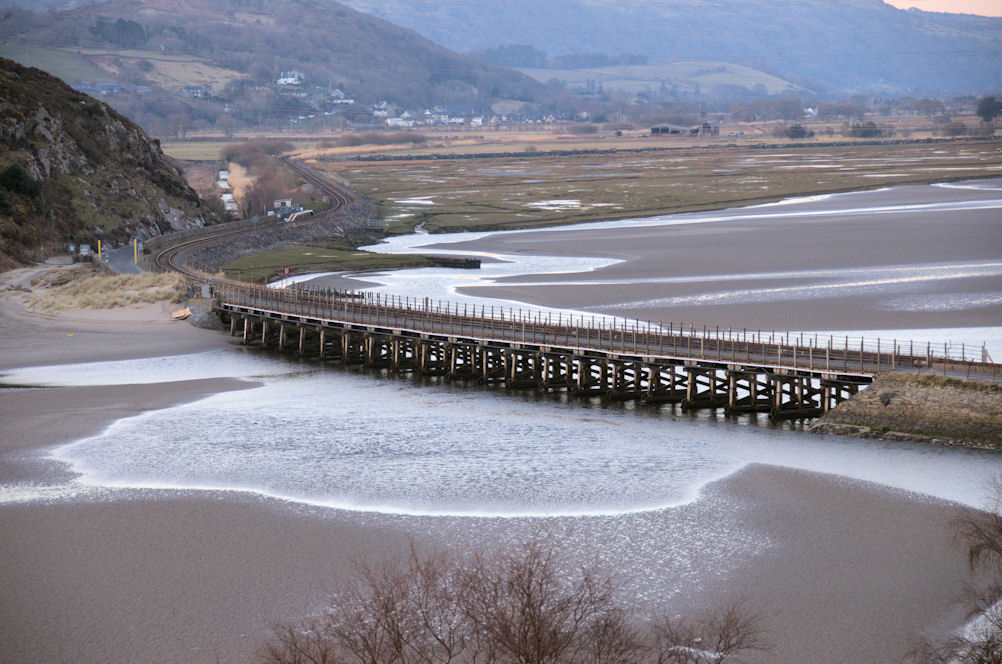
- The previous Victorian Pont Briwet; looking south towards Llandecwyn
- Coordinates: 52°55′27″N 4°03′21″W
- Carries: Cambrian Coast railway and A4085 (toll)
- Crosses: River Dwyryd
- Locale: Penrhyndeudraeth, Gwynedd North Wales
- Owner: Private
- Maintained by: Network Rail
- Heritage status: Grade II listed (formerly)

Characteristics
- Pier construction: Wood, iron bracing
- Total length: 140 m (460 ft)
- Width: Standard gauge (4 foot 8½ inch) railway track 10 feet (3.0 m) roadway
- Height: 4 m (13 ft)
- Piers in water: 21
- Load limit: 2 t (2.2 tons) (vehicles)
- Design life: rebuild GWR (1932)

History
- Constructed by: Aberystwith and Welsh Coast Railway
- Opened: 1867
- Closed: 2013

Location
- Interactive map of Pont Briwet (1)

Pont Briwet refers to the road and railway bridges that cross the River Dwyryd, near Penrhyndeudraeth, Gwynedd in North Wales. The first bridge was a Victorian road and railway viaduct that was constructed entirely from timber by the Cambrian Railways company. Although it was recognised as being a Grade II listed structure, a result of it being an increasingly rare example of a surviving 19th-century wooden road and railway viaduct, the condition of the bridge had deteriorated over time and by the 21st century was posing regular and considerable inconvenience to both road and rail traffic.

Due to the operational impact of the old bridge, it was decided to build a replacement structure alongside as a joint project between the Welsh government and national rail infrastructure company Network Rail to upgrade the route. Despite plans to retain the old bridge for pedestrian traffic, it was determined that it had been further weakened and rendered structurally unsafe by the piling performed to establish the new bridge's foundations, resulting in its immediate closure in December 2013 and its demolition during the following year.

The new Pont Briwet crosses the Dwyryd on the same alignment as the original structure but it is both stronger and wider to accommodate larger vehicles and traffic volume. It also accommodates a combined cycle path and pedestrian walkway, as well as carrying multiple utilities, such as water and electricity, across its structure. Progress on the new bridge's construction was subject to several delays, the impact of which having been compounded by the necessity of the old structure's closure prior to its completion. It was initially opened only to rail traffic during September 2014; during July 2015, the new bridge was opened to road traffic as well.

== History ==
=== Victorian bridge ===
Origins

Prior to the construction of Pont Briwet, the issue of traversing the estuaries at Traeth Mawr and Traeth Bach had been historically troublesome; people had the options of travelling across either on foot or by boat. By the 19th century, a regular ferry service was in operation. Proposals to establish a bridge crossing of the Dwyryd are believed to have been first aired during 1842, however, nothing immediately came of these proposals. During 1861 and 1862, the Aberystwith and Welsh Coast Railway company was authorised by the Aberystwith and Welsh Coast Railway Act 1861 (24 & 25 Vict. c clxxi)]] and Aberystwith and Welsh Coast Railway Act 1862 (25 & 26 Vict. c. clxxvi) to construct a coastal line along Cardigan Bay between the city of Aberystwyth and Porthdinllaen on the Lleyn Peninsula.

The company's selected route, which became commonly known as the Cambrian Coast Line, is largely attributable to the civil engineer Benjamin Piercy, the company's chief engineer at the time. The selected route included the bridge now known as Pont Briwet, which was built to carry the line to the town of Porthmadog. During 1865, the Aberystwith and Welsh Coast Railway Company merged with the rival Cambrian Railways Company. Shortly thereafter, boardroom struggles within the newly created company contributed to a delay in the project. Henry Conybeare briefly replaced Piercy as the company's chief engineer, before being himself replaced by Piercy's former deputy, George Owen. It is uncertain which of these were responsible for designing Pont Briwet.

During February 1866, the construction of the bridge was dealt a major setback when the contractor responsible for building it, Thomas Savin, was declared bankrupt. As a consequence, Pont Briwet was not completed until the following year, being officially opened on 10 October 1867. The road over the bridge acted to remove an otherwise-necessary 13 kilometre (8 mile) detour via Maentwrog, a major boon to local residents. The ferry service was soon closed due to it being unable to compete with the newly opened bridge.

Design

The original Pont Briwet was a timber pile viaduct, which were a commonplace feature of coastal railways during this era, being relatively cheap and flexible structures in comparison to the common alternatives. It accommodated both a single track for rail traffic as well as a single lane of roadway for a toll road. Although the bridge was decked with timber planks, the road carriageway was waterproofed with a metalled surface. The deck was carried upon 22 equal spans, which were evenly spaced at intervals of 5.8 metres. The bridge was furnished with substantial battered abutments, composed of rough blocks of slate that were in excess of 40 metres in terms of length.

The piers of the bridge comprised either four or five timber piles, each roughly 350mm across, which were connected by crosshead timbers and braced with diagonals. Iron was used for the bolts and bracing bars used to fix elements in place. These created a series of frames on which longitudinal beams carried both the road and railway; those beams that were underneath the tracks were substantially larger than those under the roadway due to the greater weight of trains in comparison to road vehicles during that time.

Operational life

During 1932, the bridge was extensively rebuilt by the Great Western Railway (GWR) company, into which Cambrian Railways had been amalgamated during the 1920s. During this work, half of the wooden piles were replaced with new creosoted pitch pine; it is believed that in excess of 183 tonnes of timber were removed during the replacement process. Additional changes made to the structure also included alterations to the cross members and bracings. As a consequence of this work, the overall width of the bridge was increased to 8.5 m (28 ft).

A less popular practice of Pont Briwet was the toll that was in place for road vehicles. During 1909, the local council lent its support towards efforts to abolish the tolls on the bridge; however, this pressure was ultimately unsuccessful at removing the tolls as the practice survived until the closure of the original bridge during the early 21st century. By 2009, toll prices were 40p for cars, as well as 30p for trailers and motorcycles. Despite the nationalisation of the "Big Four" British railway companies during early 1947, the viaduct remained a privately owned toll road for road traffic travelling between Penrhyndeudraeth and Harlech. Over time, the roadway was redesigned to control vehicle movements using sets of traffic lights that were located at either end of the bridge.

Reportedly, the bridge and line benefited heavily from the freight traffic generated after the establishment of Cooke's explosives factory near Penrhyndeudraeth during 1872.

By 2010, a speed limit of 20 mph (32 km/h) had been imposed on all trains crossing the bridge. Additionally, in terms of road vehicles, the structure could only accommodate single-file traffic, serving both directions of traffic by alternating between the two. It was also restricted to those vehicles that weighed less than 2 t (2.2 tons); as a result of this restriction, the route was only passable by cars, which meant that all heavier vehicles would have to go through a 8 miles (13 km) detour, significantly affecting the journeys of ambulances and buses, along with vans and lorries. Pedestrians were also unable to use the bridge because of the narrow width of the carriageway.

=== Replacement ===
Pont Briwet (2)
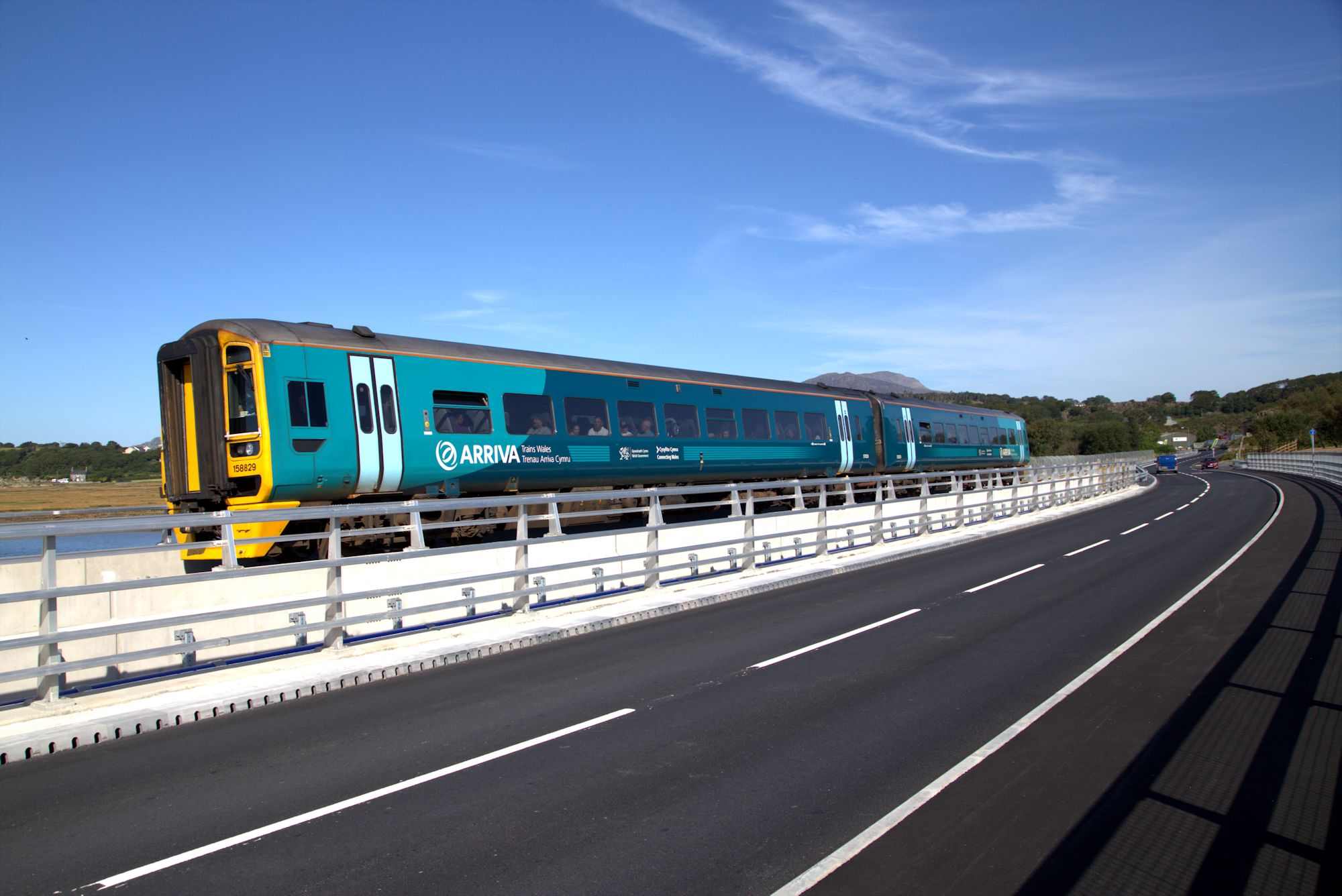
- Completed Pont Briwet rail crossing
- Coordinates: 52°55′27″N 4°03′21″W
- Carries: Cambrian Coast railway A4085
- Crosses: River Dwyryd
- Locale: Penrhyndeudraeth, Gwynedd North Wales

Characteristics
- Pier construction: concrete, steel
- Width: 18 m (59 ft) (completed)
- Piers in water: 6

History
- Opened: 2014 (rail); 2015 (road)
- Replaces: Victorian wooden viaduct

Location
- Interactive map of Pont Briwet (2)

Planning

During July 2010, the Welsh Assembly Government announced the launch of a £20 million joint project with national rail infrastructure company Network Rail that intended to produce a new structure to replace the existing bridge by 2013. At the time, it was stated that the old bridge was to be retained as a result of its listed status; following the opening of the new bridge, it was intended that it would be transformed into a pedestrian walkway. However, soon after the commencement of work on the new structure, approval was granted for the old viaduct's demolition during February 2012.

The new Pont Briwet would carry the single-track railway plus a two-lane carriageway and a 2.5 m (8 ft 2 in) combined cycleway and footpath. The road's speed limit would be raised to 40 mph (64 km/h) and toll charges abolished. Although the road and rail bridges share the same pillars, like the original viaduct, the superstructures of the new crossings would be separate. Planners also said that, apart from a four-week period in which work would be undertaken to relocate electrical cabling, the old viaduct would remain open throughout the works.

Design and construction

During March 2013, work commenced upon the construction of the new bridge. However, in November 2013, it was announced that the existing wooden bridge had been found to have been affected by the piling activity performed to produce the new bridge's foundations. The old bridge was declared structurally unsafe and closed to all traffic during December 2013. The closure necessitated an 8-mile diversion via Maentwrog for road users and rail services were terminated at Harlech, closing the 22 miles (35 km) line to Pwllheli via Porthmadog. A new temporary road bridge was due to be in place by Spring 2014, but this plan was shelved by Gwynedd County Council in favour of a controlled traffic management system on the A496 between Maentwrog and Llandecwyn because of safety fears related to increased traffic on the A496.

The 'design and build' contract was awarded to Hochtief and Hewson Consulting acted as their lead consultant for the multi-disciplinary design team. The design of the replacement bridge features the extensive use of the innovative precasting technique which accelerated the construction activities and minimised the disruption to surrounding watercourse.

Completion

On 1 September 2014, the new rail viaduct was opened for services between Harlech and Pwllheli. However, work continued into the following year on the accompanying roadway; progress on its construction had been delayed by difficulty in the relocation of electricity cables and a water main that previously crossed the old bridge. After two years of work and some significant delays, the road crossing was finally opened to traffic in the summer of 2015.

== See also ==
- List of bridges in Wales
- Barmouth Viaduct, a surviving 19th-century wooden trestle bridge across the River Mawddach
- Traeth Mawr, The Cob embankment was once another privatised road and rail crossing near Porthmadog
- Ffestiniog Railway
