= River Dwyryd =

River in Gwynedd, Wales

Coordinates: 52.97562°N 3.94496°W

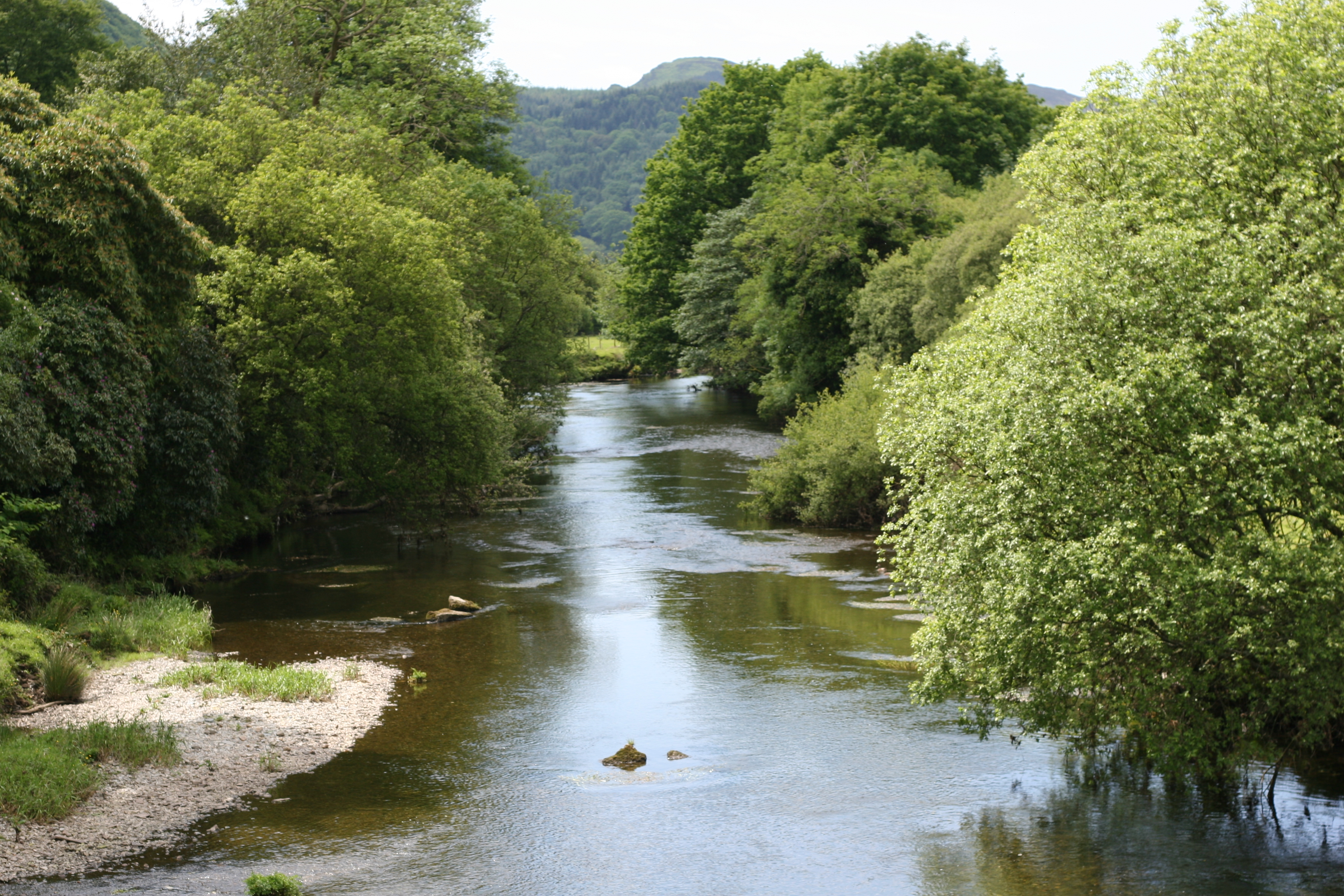
The River Dwyryd at Maentwrog

The River Dwyryd (Welsh: Afon Dwyryd), is a river in Gwynedd, Wales which flows principally westwards; draining to the sea into Tremadog Bay, south of Porthmadog.

== Geography ==
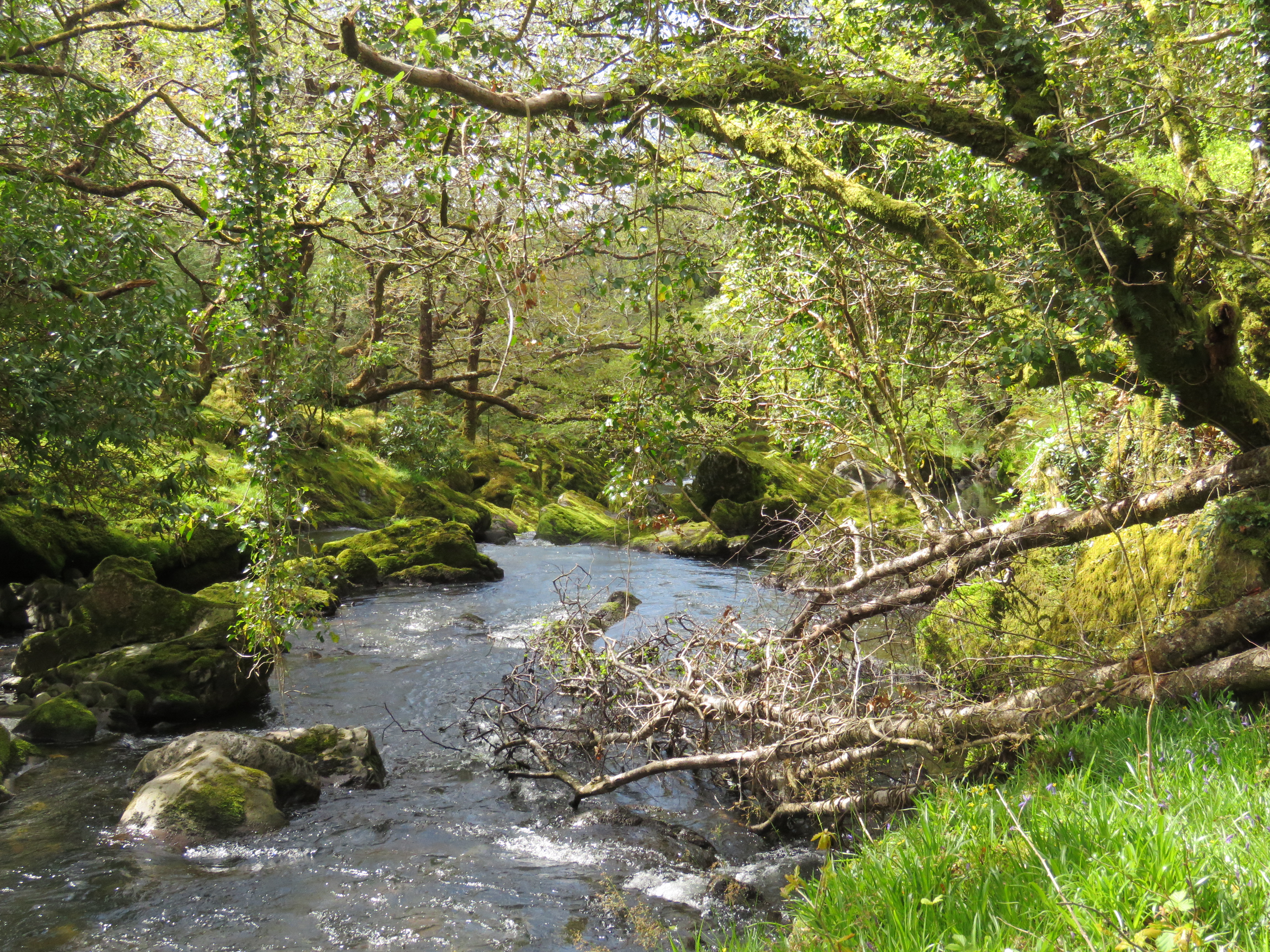
Afon Goedol

The Dwyryd rises in the hills to the north of Ffestiniog. At its most northern extent, water draining from Moelwyn Mawr drains into Llyn Ystradau, the outflow of which forms the source of the Afon Goedol. This is joined by the River Bowydd at grid reference: SH695438. At Rhyd-y-Sarn, the Afon Goedol is joined by the Afon Teigl (originating from Manod Mawr). Thereafter, the river is called the Afon Dwyryd. Below Rhyd y Sarn by Pont Dolymoch, the river is joined by the Afon Cynfal which flows from the east down a deep wooded gorge which includes the spectacular Rhaeadr Cynfal (Cynfal waterfall) south of Ffestiniog. The main river then flows through a wide valley formed by glaciation, with a broad flat base formed from glacial moraines and riverine gravel deposits. The valley, the Vale of Ffestiniog, has much agriculture but is subject to routine winter flooding.

The Afon Tafarn-helyg has its confluence about one mile (1.6 km) further downstream. This tributary rises south of Gellilydan and just north of the reservoir of Llyn Trawsfynydd but does not receive any water from the reservoir.

There are a number of small lakes and reservoirs in the woodlands north of Plas Tan y Bwlch which also drain south into the river. These lakes include Llyn y Garnedd, Llyn Hafod y Llyn and Llyn Mair.

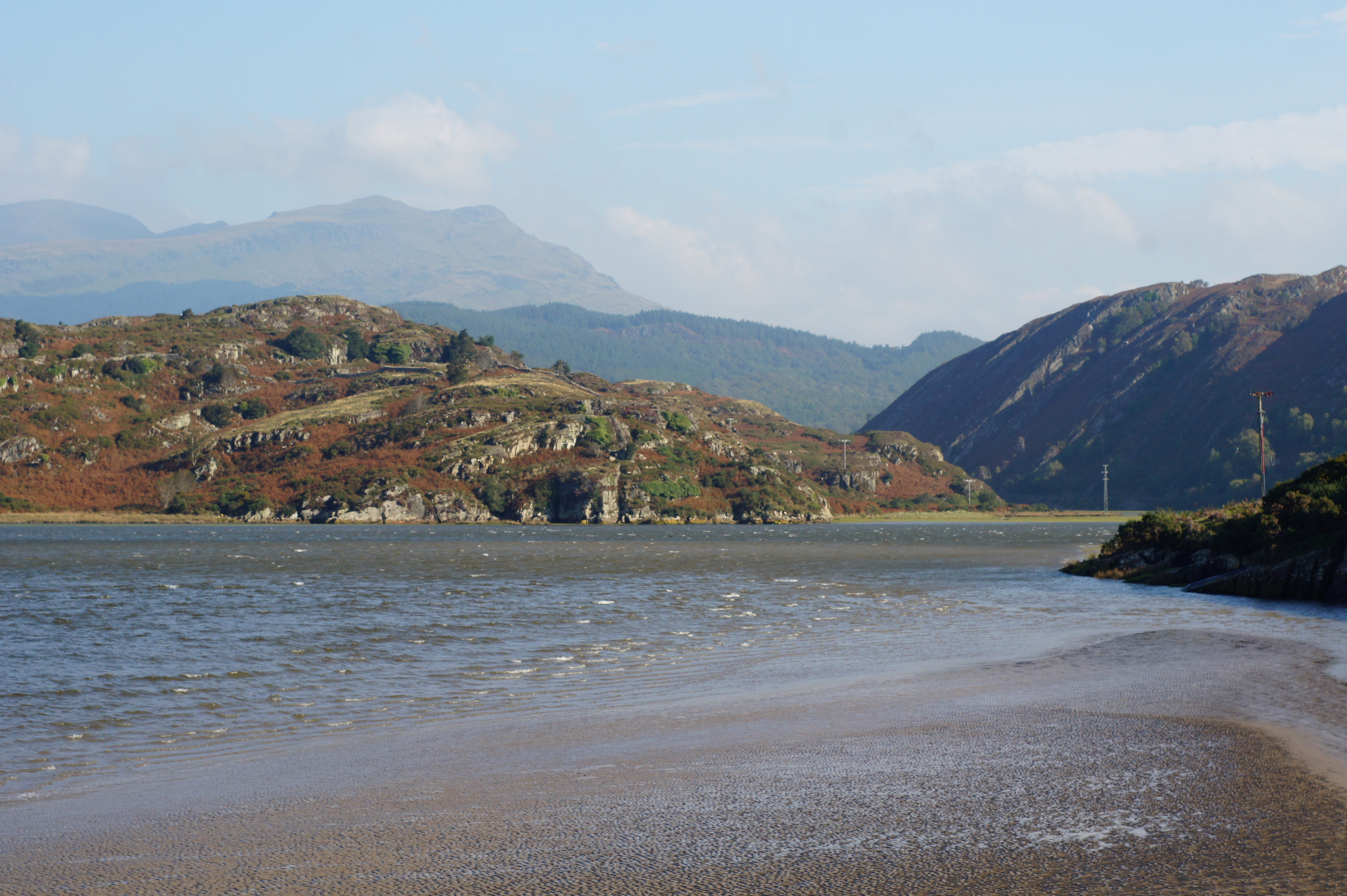
Dwyryd estuary from Pont Briwet

At Maentwrog the Dwyryd becomes a long and sandy tidal estuary, flowing under the road and railway line at Pont Briwet, before joining with the estuary of the River Glaslyn and then entering into Porthmadog Bay. The Afon y Glyn which drains the southwest catchment from Llyn Tecwyn Uchaf and Llyn Tecwyn Isaf enters the southern side of the Glaslyn estuary at the south end of a large extent of salt marsh known as Glastraeth (green beach) on its south bank and opposite the village of Portmeirion.

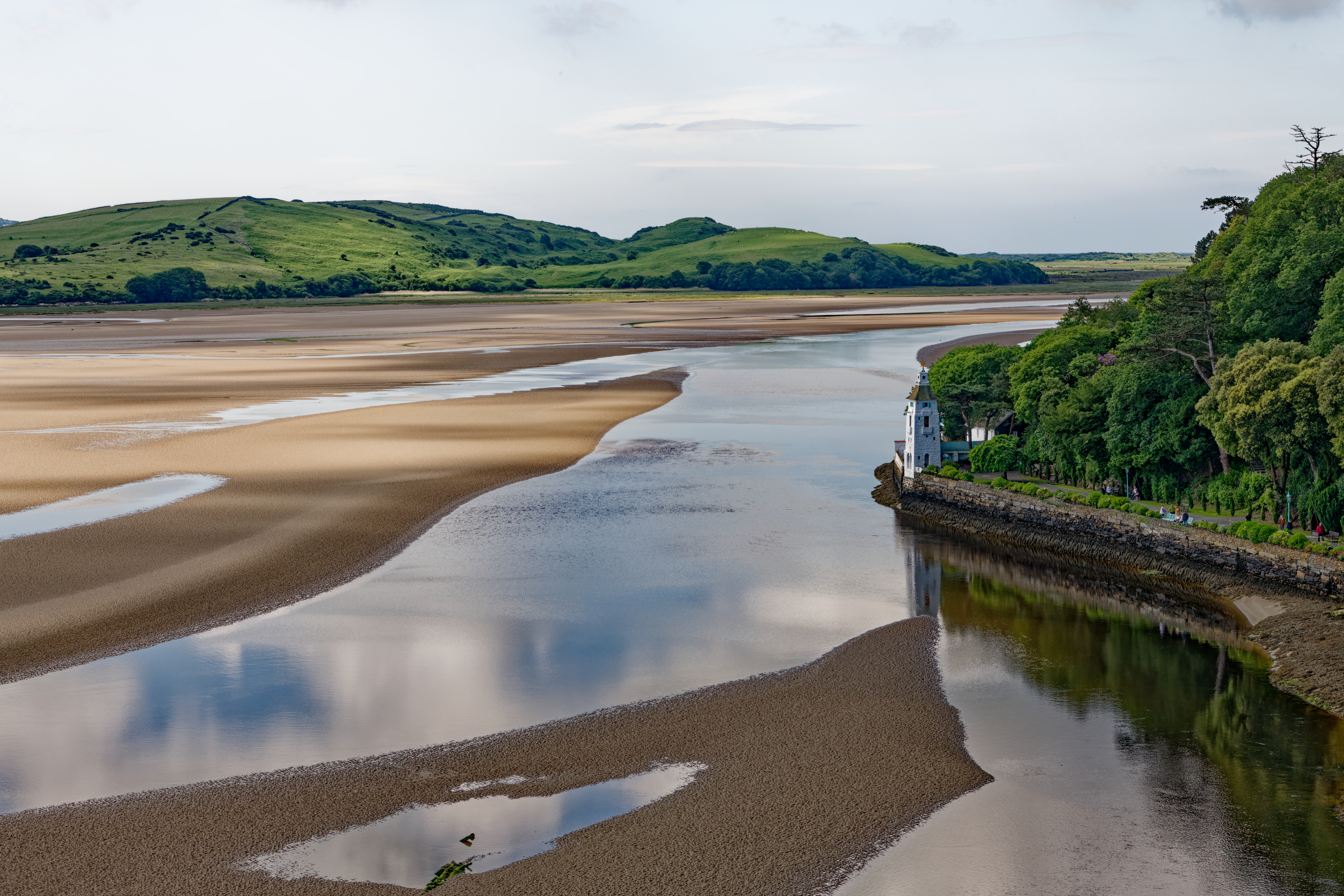
The estuary from Portmeirion

The whole of the river drains off igneous and ancient rocks of the Cambrian and Ordovician which are all base-poor. Much of the catchment has also been used for commercial forestry during the last hundred years. As a consequence, many of the tributaries are highly acidic as a result of atmospheric acidification. This has constrained the quality of the fishery and the biodiversity in many tributaries. Some of these problems have been exacerbated by past industrial activities including metal mining, slate mining, animal skin processing and the use by the army of a gunnery range with large amounts of emplaced metal cartridge shells.

=== Afon Prysor ===
The Afon Prysor is the largest tributary of the Dwyryd, entering its left bank in the tidal section downstream of Maentwrog. It rises in the hills to the east of Trawsfynydd and flows past the southern end of the village to enter Llyn Trawsfynydd, a large reservoir close to the A470. Prior to construction of the dam in the 1920s for hydroelectric power, the river had wandered across a broad upland marsh here known as Cors Goch. It is the only inland water in the UK that has been used as a source of cooling water for a nuclear power station. The Afon Prysor resumes its course below the dam, to flow down to the Dwyryd through the steeply wooded valley of Ceunant Llennyrch which is at the core of a national nature reserve. Most of the flow from the reservoir is channelled through the hydro-electric power station close to Maentwrog; the flow then re-joins the Prysor just before the confluence.

== River traffic ==
At no point is the river deep enough to accommodate sea-going ships, but in the second half of the 18th century a number of quays were constructed west of Maentwrog from which small vessels took cargoes of timber and, increasingly, slate to be transferred to sea-going ships in deeper water southwest of what would become Porthmadog, transferring to Porthmadog itself when its harbour was opened in 1824. The river was and remains so shallow that viable cargoes could only be carried at spring tides. Some of the quays remain to this day, used by anglers. The opening of the Ffestiniog Railway in 1836 dealt a mortal blow to the Dwyryd traffic, which ended completely by 1860.

== Electricity pylons ==
Since 1966, the 400kV electricity transmission route connecting the Pentir substation near Bangor with the former Trawsfynydd Power Station, now a 400kV substation, has crossed the estuary near to Penrhyndeudraeth, with pylons used on this section of the route. In 2022 work began to remove the pylons which cross the estuary and once completed, this part of the route will run beneath the estuary. This will take seven years to complete, and ten pylons will be removed.

== Further material ==
- Cook, W.; Rees, E. I. S. (1978). Survey of macroinvertebrate populations in the Glaslyn/Dwyryd estuary. Bangor: University College of North Wales. OCLC 26878862.
- McElvogue, D. M. (2003). "Cwch Talsarnau: a boat from the Afon Dwyryd". Maritime Wales. 24. Caernarfon: Gwynedd Archives: 41–49. ISSN 0308-2334.
- Mahamod, Yusuff (1989). Sedimentary processes in the Dwyryd estuary. Bangor: University College of North Wales. OCLC 59073406.
- Parr, W.; Wheeler, M.; Codling, I. (1999). Nutrient status of the Glaslyn/Dwyryd, Mawddach and Dyfi estuaries : its context and ecological importance. Bangor: Countryside Council for Wales. OCLC 41159259.
- Richards, Alun John; Napier, Jean (2008). Two Snowdonia rivers : Glaslyn & Dwyryd. Llanrwst: Gwasg Carreg Gwalch. ISBN 978-0-9512373-3-5.
- Welsh Region, National Rivers Authority (1995). Glaslyn/Dwyrd/Artro catchment management plan : Consultation report : May 1995. Cardiff: National Rivers Authority. OCLC 35784878.
