= Harlech railway station =

Railway station in Gwynedd, Wales

Harlech
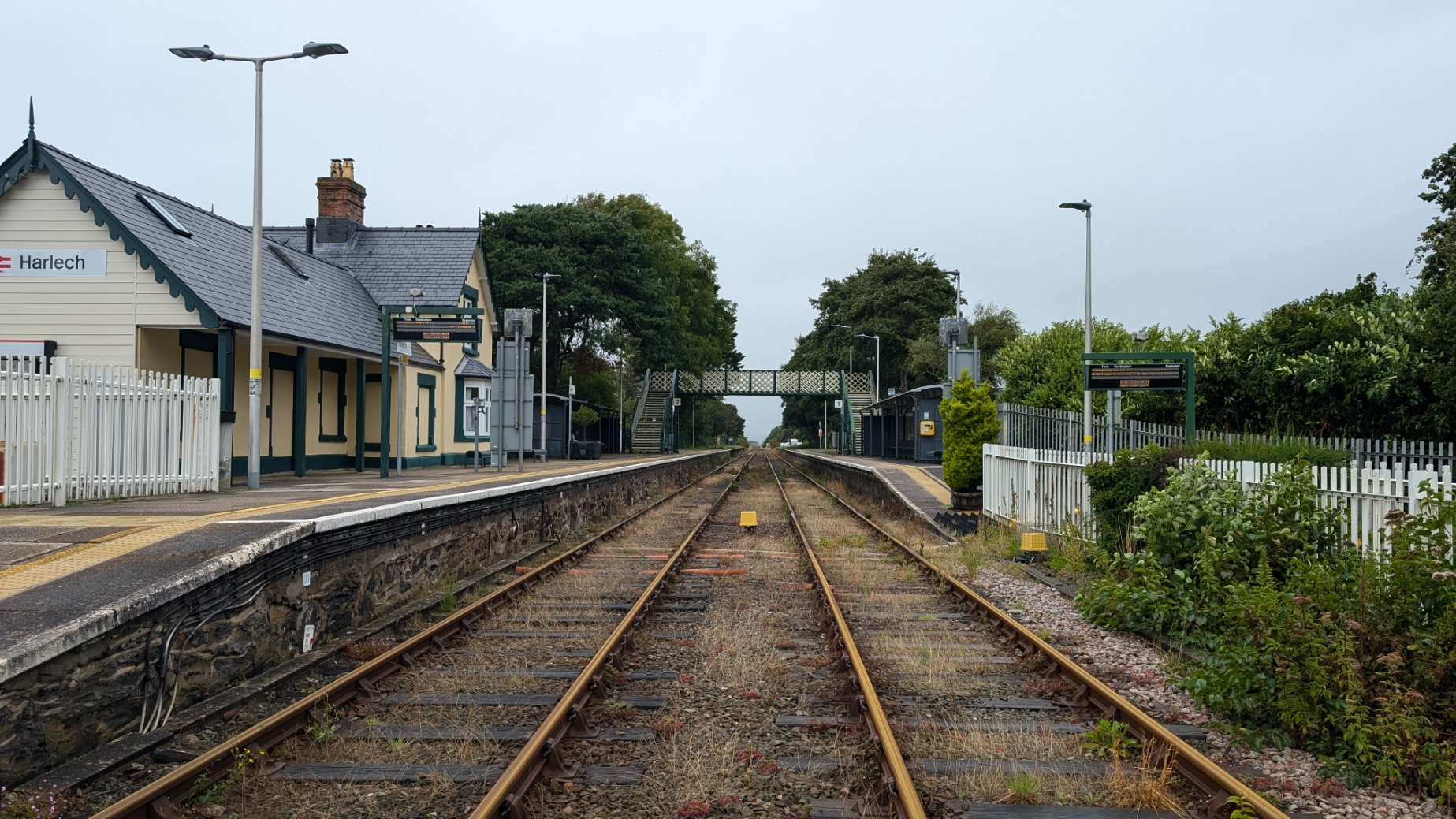
- The view westbound (2024)

General information
- Location: Harlech, Gwynedd, Wales
- Coordinates: 52.861605°N 4.109531°W
- Grid reference: SH580314
- Manager: Transport for Wales
- Platforms: 2

Other information
- Station code: HRL
- Classification: DfT category F1

History
- Original company: Aberystwith and Welsh Coast Railway
- Pre-grouping: Cambrian Railways
- Post-grouping: Great Western Railway

Passengers
- 2020/21: ▼84,612
- 2021/22: ▲0.104 million
- 2022/23: ▲0.120 million
- 2023/24: ▼0.115 million
- 2024/25: ▲0.129 million
Location
Notes
- Passenger statistics from the Office of Rail and Road

Harlech railway station serves the town of Harlech, in Gwynedd, Wales. It is located at a level crossing on the A496, near to the centre of the town. The station lies on the Cambrian Coast Railway, with passenger services to Porthmadog, Pwllheli, Barmouth, Machynlleth, Shrewsbury and Birmingham International.

== History ==
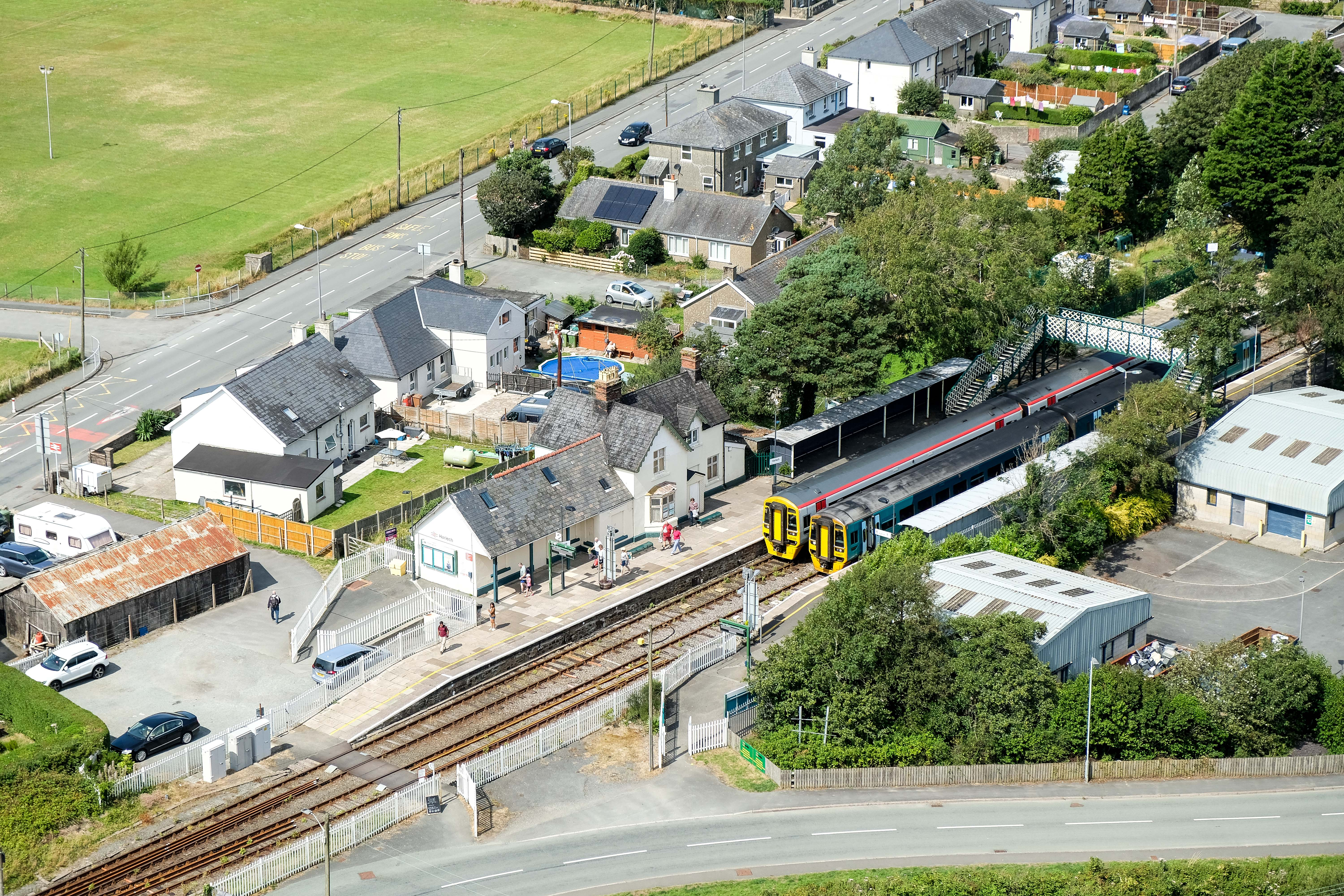
The station, as seen from Harlech Castle

Until the 1960s, in addition to Cambrian Line services, there was a summer service between London Paddington and Pwllheli, via Birmingham Snow Hill, Shrewsbury and Machynlleth.

From January to April 2014, the line from Machynlleth was out of service for repairs due to storm damage north of Barmouth and a replacement bus service was in operation. This was due to the major repairs required to the formation, which required a complete rebuild of the sea wall, as well as the track bed at Llanaber. Services to the north were also suspended until the beginning of September 2014, whilst a replacement for the Grade II-listed 1867 wooden viaduct at Pont Briwet was being constructed.

The waiting shelters were installed to cater for the high numbers of schoolchildren commuting to and from the adjacent secondary school, Ysgol Ardudwy.

== Services ==
Transport for Wales services stop approximately once every two hours in each direction. Most southbound trains continue beyond Shrewsbury to Birmingham New Street and Birmingham International.

Preceding station	National Rail	Following station
Tygwyn	Transport for Wales Cambrian Coast Line	Llandanwg
	Historical railways	
Tygwyn; Line and station open	Cambrian Railways; Aberystwith and Welsh Coast Railway	Llandanwg; Line and station open
