= Pwllheli railway station =

Railway station in Gwynedd, Wales

Pwllheli
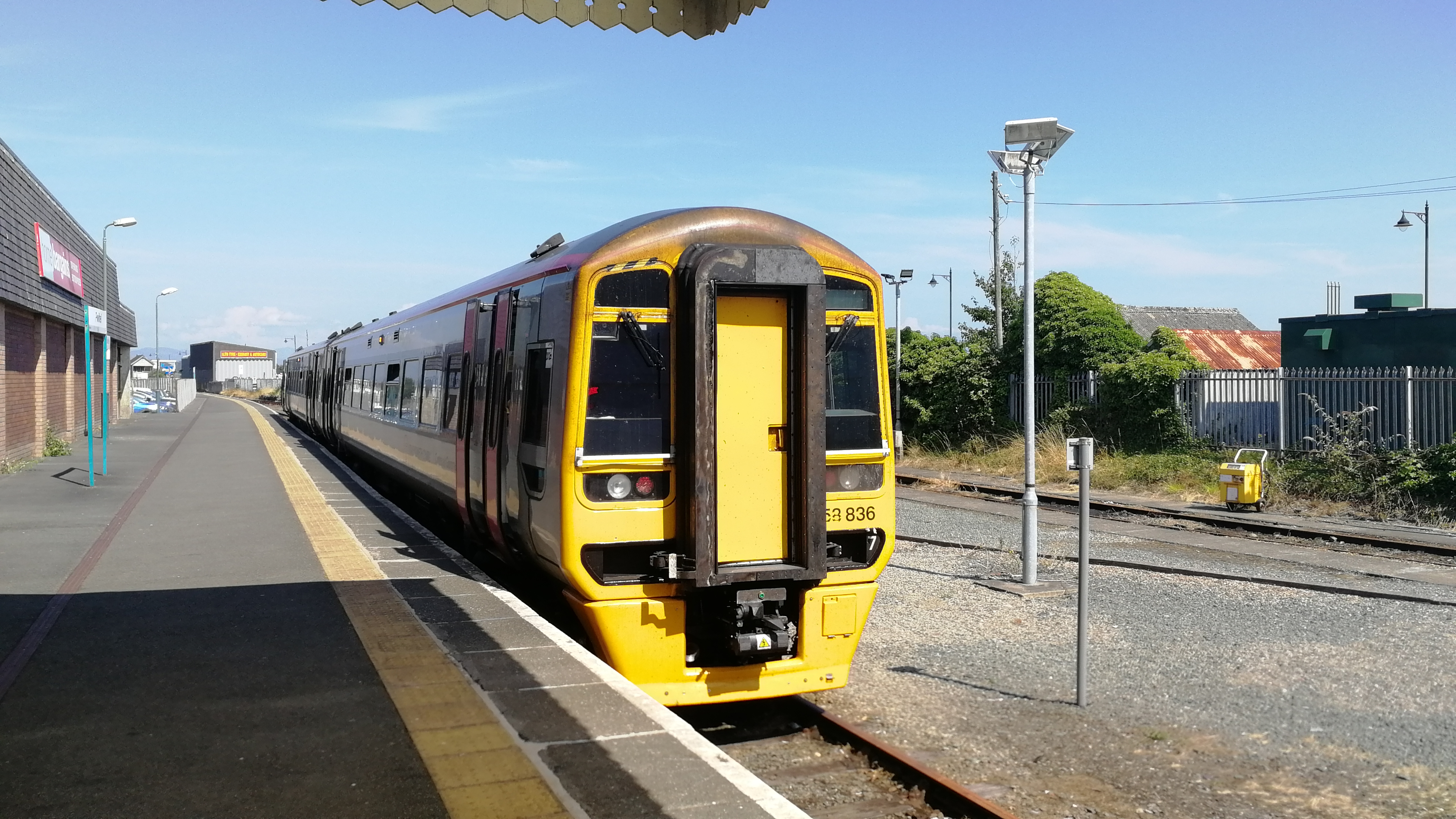
- Transport for Wales Class 158 at Pwllheli in July 2021.

General information
- Location: Pwllheli, Gwynedd; Wales
- Coordinates: 52.888°N 4.417°W
- Grid reference: SH375350
- Managed by: Transport for Wales
- Platforms: 1

Other information
- Station code: PWL
- Classification: DfT category E

History
- Original company: Aberystwith and Welsh Coast Railway
- Pre-grouping: Cambrian Railways
- Post-grouping: Great Western Railway

Key dates
- 10 October 1867: Opened
- 19 July 1909: Moved to current site
- 12 September 1977: Signal boxes and 1 of 2 platforms closed

Passengers
- 2020/21: ▼9,184
- 2021/22: ▲45,208
- 2022/23: ▲73,332
- 2023/24: ▲77,468
- 2024/25: ▲98,420

Listed Building – Grade II
- Feature: Pwllheli railway station
- Designated: 28 July 1989
- Reference no.: 4589
Location
Notes
- Passenger statistics from the Office of Rail and Road

Pwllheli railway station serves the small coastal town of Pwllheli, on the Llŷn Peninsula in Gwynedd, Wales. It is the northern terminus of the Cambrian Coast Railway.

== History ==
In 1861 the Aberystwith and Welsh Coast Railway was given authorisation to build a line along Cardigan Bay between Aberystwyth and Porthdinllaen on the Llŷn Peninsula. However, the final five miles across the Llŷn Peninsula were never built. By 1865 the company had merged to become part of Cambrian Railways. When the first Pwllheli station opened on Thursday 10 October 1867 the decision to not complete the final five miles to Nefyn had already been taken. The station, which was about a half a mile from the town, became the line's terminus.

On 19 July 1909 a second station was opened near by the town centre following land reclamation that permitted the extension of the line. It had two tracks separated by an island platform with a small loading dock to the north. The layout remained unchanged until rationalisation began in September 1977.

A goods yard was developed on the site of the first station. Its turntable is now in the possession of the West Somerset Railway. The Great Western Railway (GWR) doubled the track between Pwllheli station and the goods yard in order to increase capacity. But after the goods yard was closed and both the signal boxes and the signals were removed in 1977, the double-lined section is now used as a long run-round loop for visiting charter trains. By 1987 a supermarket had been developed on the former goods yard land.

Prior to the closure of the Afon Wen to Caernarfon Line in 1964, there were two named daily express services during the summer between Pwllheli and London:

- The Cambrian Coast Express ran via Machynlleth, Shrewsbury and Birmingham to London Paddington.
- The Welshman ran via Caernarfon and Crewe to Euston.

In 1977 one side of the island platform was abandoned and the track was lifted (the land is now a car park). The station canopy, which was constructed by the GWR, survived intact until some glass fell out in late 1979, and it was shortened early in 1980. Today only the concourse and a short section of the platform remain covered. Pwllheli has one platform, a siding and a loop. One of the old signal boxes also remains and is used as a covered ground frame to operate the loop points.

== Facilities ==
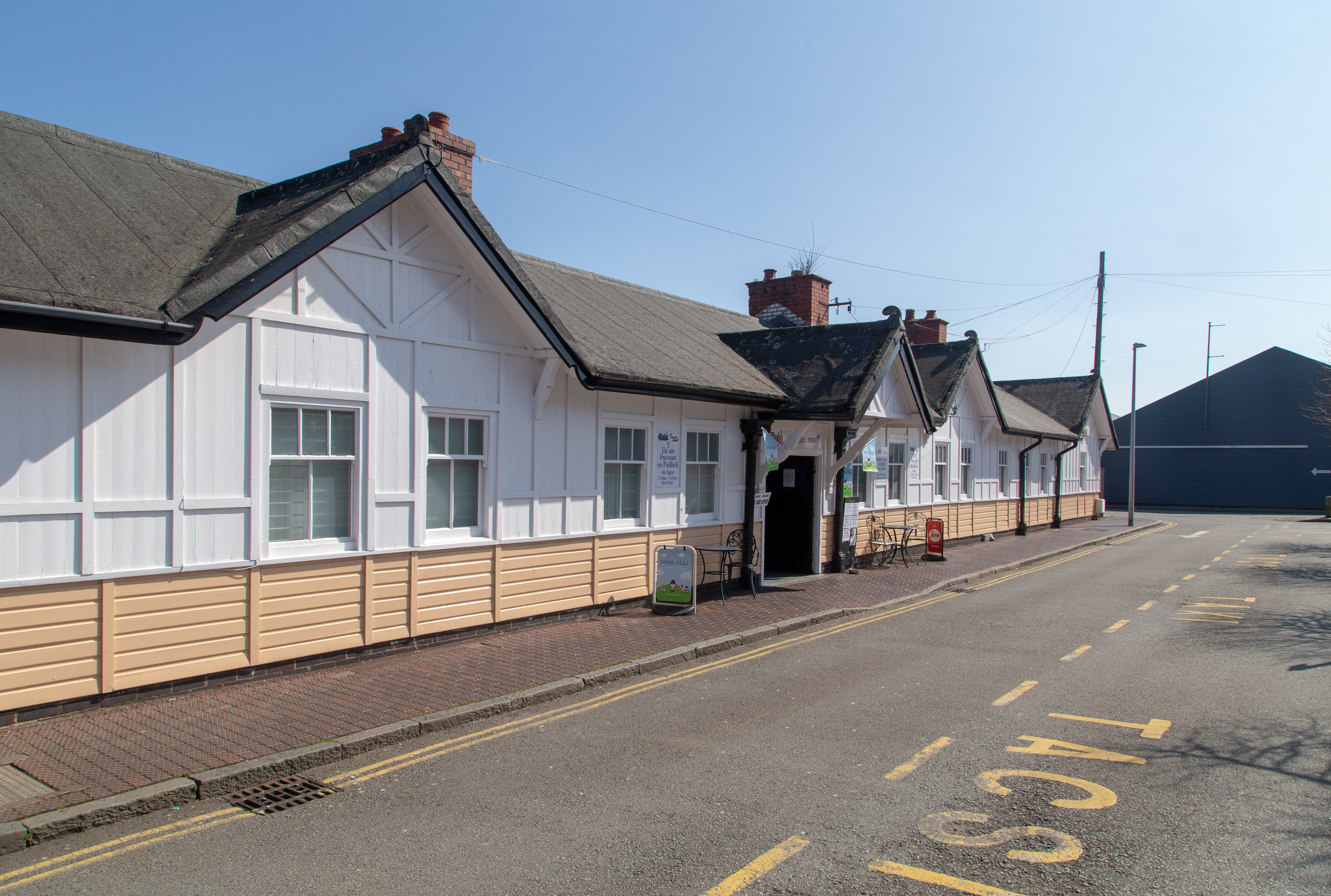
Former station building, now used as a cafe and coffee shop (April 2019)

The station is now unstaffed and has no ticket machine, so all tickets must be purchased on the train or prior to travel. The main building still stands - part of it is used as a cafe and coffee shop whilst the remainder provides covered waiting accommodation. Train running information is offered by means of digital display screens, automated announcements, timetable poster boards and a customer help point. Step-free access is provided from the main entrance to the platform.

== Services ==
All services are operated by Transport for Wales. Trains run between Pwllheli and Machynlleth roughly every two hours on weekdays (Mon-Sat), with 5 trains in each direction on Sundays. From 1 September to 1 December 2023 engineering work took place to finish restoration of the Barmouth Viaduct.

In November 2013, services from the station were suspended due to structural problems with the 1867 Grade II-listed wooden viaduct at Pont Briwet near Llandecwyn. Network Rail had intended to build the new bridge alongside the current one whilst keeping the latter open, but work to drive steel piles into the riverbed to support the new viaduct caused the old one to shift and made it unsafe. As a result, the train service north of Harlech had to be temporarily withdrawn whilst construction work continued and did not resume until the new bridge was ready. Meanwhile, a replacement bus service ran over the 22 mile (35 km) section to Harlech. The line eventually reopened on 1 September 2014 when construction work on the rail portion of the new bridge was completed.

| Preceding station | National Rail | Following station |
|---|---|---|
| Terminus | Transport for Wales; Cambrian Coast Line | Abererch |
| | Historical railways | |
| Terminus | Cambrian Railways; Aberystwith and Welsh Coast Railway | Abererch; Line and station open |

== Sources ==
- Butt, R. V. J. (October 1995). The Directory of Railway Stations: details every public and private passenger station, halt, platform and stopping place, past and present (1st ed.). Sparkford: Patrick Stephens Ltd. ISBN 978-1-85260-508-7. OCLC 60251199. OL 11956311M.
- Jowett, Alan (March 1989). Jowett's Railway Atlas of Great Britain and Ireland: From Pre-Grouping to the Present Day (1st ed.). Sparkford: Patrick Stephens Ltd. ISBN 978-1-85260-086-0. OCLC 22311137.
- Shannon, Paul; Hillmer, John (1999). North Wales (British Railways Past & Present) Part 2. Kettering: Past & Present Publishing Ltd. ISBN 1-85895-163-1. No 36.
