= Neuadd =

Neuadd may refer to the following places in Wales:

- Neuadd and Tylelo Mires, Site of Special Scientific Interest in Brecknock, Powys
- Neuadd Idris, old market hall in Dolgellau, Gwynedd
- Neuadd Trefawr, village in the community of Beulah, Ceredigion
- Neuadd Wilym, village in the community of Llangoedmor, Ceredigion
