= Golden Bog of Cullen =

Archeological site in Ireland

- Portach Órga Chuillinn (Irish)
- Location within Ireland
- 52.507500°N 8.284449°W
- Type: peat bog containing gold and brass artefacts
- Cultures: Atlantic Bronze Age
- Location: Longstone, Kilcornan, County Tipperary, Ireland

Site notes
- Public access: no

The Golden Bog of Cullen is an archaeological site located in County Tipperary, Ireland. Discovered in the 18th century, it has been described as "one of the most important and prolific sites" in Ireland; it was discovered before modern methods of preservation and collection, and almost all of the finds were melted down.

== Location ==
The Golden Bog is located 650 metres (0.40 mi) southwest of Cullen, County Tipperary, 1 kilometre (0.62 mi) east of Longstone Rath. This was part of the ancient Gaelic territory of Uí Cuanach (Coonagh).

== Artifacts ==
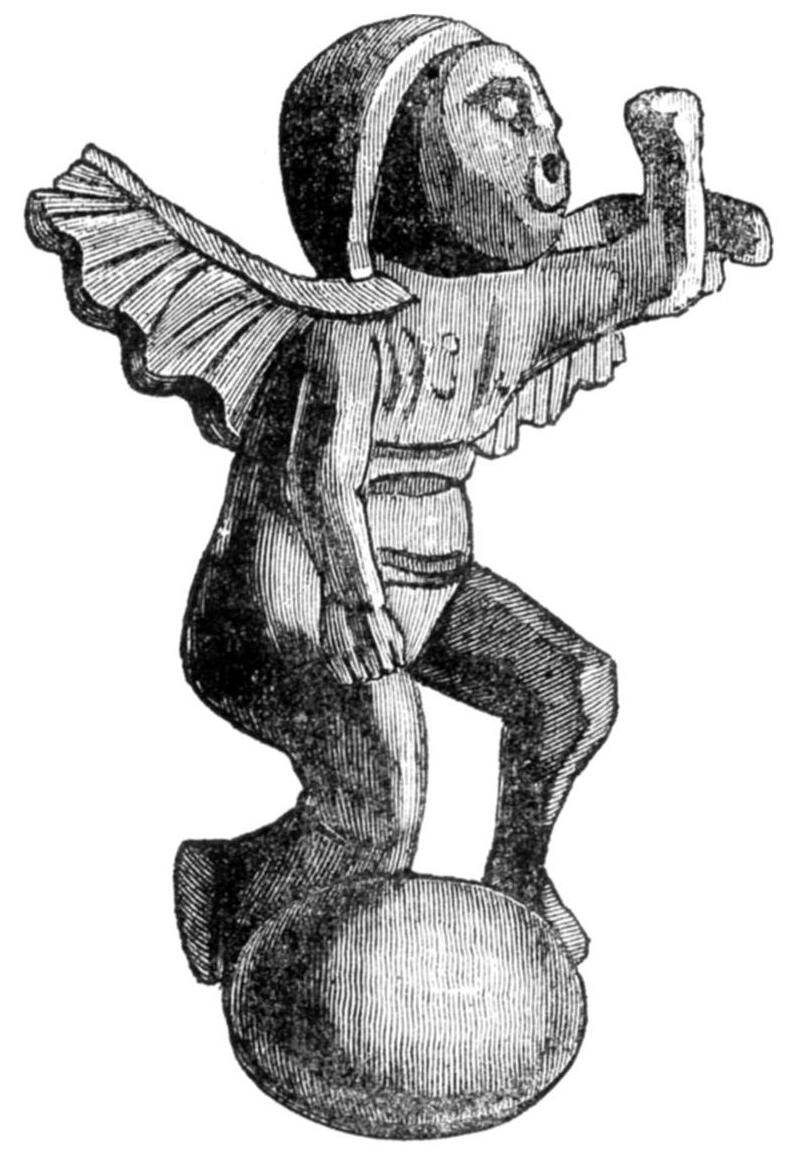
A bronze from the Cullen bog, a figure missing his trumpet, Dublin Penny Journal, 1833

The earliest recorded find dates to 1731, a two-gallon (9-litre) brass vessel with four legs.

In 1744, a Limerick jeweller bought from a Cullen shopkeeper a gold crown weighing 6 troy ounces (190 g); the metal was of a very high purity.

Objects found on the site included 300 brass swords, a golden cone (described as "the breast of a wooden idol"), bars of pure gold, and gold gorgets.

As most of the items were discovered before modern methods of preservation and collection of ancient artefacts, the objects were generally sold to goldsmiths for their bullion value. Only one gold item is known to survive, a dress-fastener or terminal, currently held at the Birmingham Museum and Art Gallery.

== History ==
Eugene O'Curry speculated that the Bog was originally a wooded valley, used by goldsmiths due to its proximity to sources of wood for charcoal, as well as possibly a goldmine. He connected it with the ancient Cerdraigi, a Gaelic tribe whose name derives from cerd, an Old Irish term for a skilled craftsman, especially a worker in gold and silver. He also note the townland of Ballynagard located 5 miles (8.0 km) to the west: in Irish Baile na gCeard, "settlement of the goldsmiths."

Their placement in the bog is possibly a form of ritual deposition. The culture that produced and deposited these items is thought to date to c. 2000–400 BC, during the Atlantic Bronze Age.

== See also ==
- Wetland deposits in Scandinavia
- Irish gold
