= Welsh gold =

Gold mined in two distinct areas of Wales

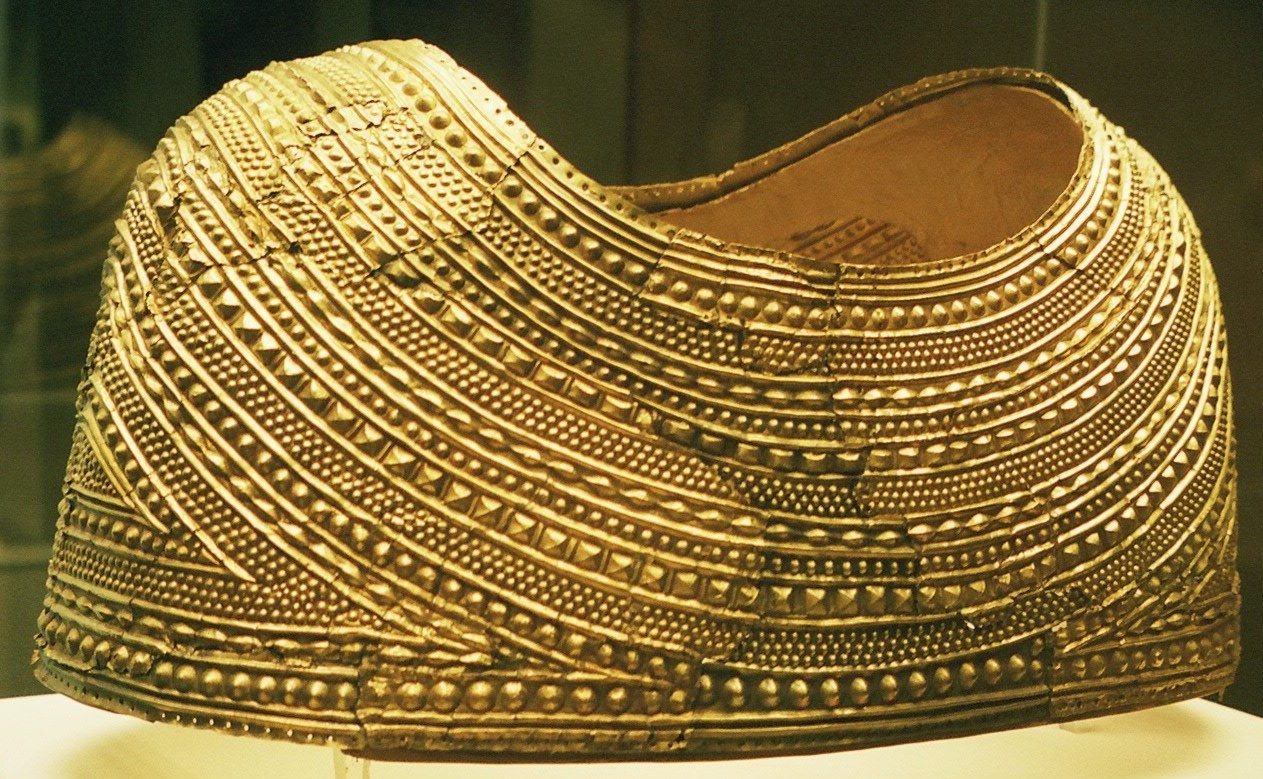
The Mold Cape, solid sheet-gold, c. 1900–1600 BC, Bronze Age. It was found at Mold, Flintshire, in 1833.

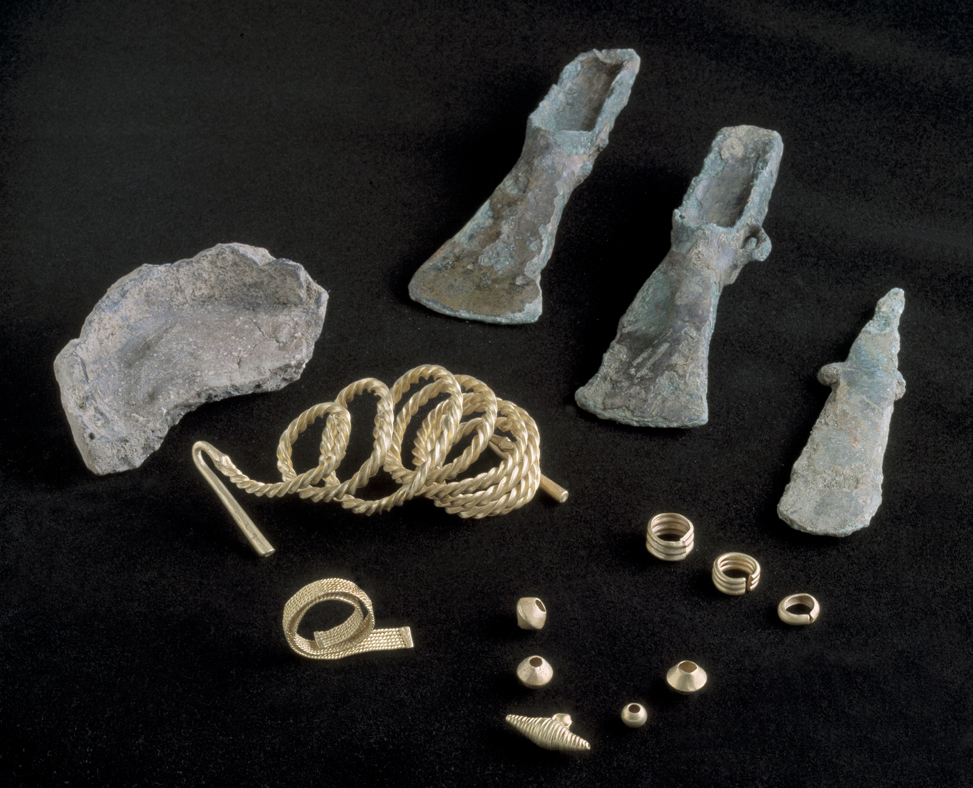
The Bronze Age Burton Hoard, from Burton, Wrexham. The gold items are a folded torc, a twisted-wire bracelet, a necklace pendant, 4 beads and 3 rings (Amgueddfa Cymru – Museum Wales).

Welsh gold is gold found in natural geological deposits in two distinct areas of Wales in the United Kingdom. It has been prized for its origin and scarcity, particularly by members of the British royal family.

In North Wales gold is often found in a band stretching from Barmouth, past Dolgellau and north towards Snowdonia. The largest of the mines in North Wales were the Gwynfynydd Gold Mine, near Ganllwyd, and the Clogau Gold Mine near Bontddu. In South Wales gold is found in a small area in the valley of the river Afon Cothi at Dolaucothi, where it is known to have been mined by the Ancient Romans.

Celtic jewellery, such as torcs, was worn by early Welsh princes, and ancient gold artefacts found in Wales include the Mold Cape and the Banc Ty'nddôl sun-disc, found at the Cwmystwyth Mines in 2002. It is not possible to confirm that these use Welsh gold since there were strong trade links between Wales and Ireland at the time and Ireland was the major area of gold working in the Bronze Age British Isles. Gold from Ireland is especially well known from the Irish Bronze Age as being used for jewellery, in the form of gold lunulae, torcs, gorgets, rings and bracelets. It was presumably collected by panning from alluvial placers in river beds or near old rivers.

The Jersey-registered company Gold Mines of Wales Limited has, by permission of the Crown, an exploration licence for Wales. Gold Mines of Wales Limited is a subsidiary of Alba Mineral Resources, a publicly listed company headquartered in London.

== Dolaucothi ==
The earliest known Welsh gold mines are the Dolaucothi Gold Mines near Pumsaint in Carmarthenshire, which were begun by the Romans about AD 74. It was closed in 1938 and donated to the National Trust in 1941. A hoard of gold objects was found near the village of Pumsaint close to the mines in the 18th century, and is now in the British Museum in London.

However, Dolaucothi is best known for its exploitation on a large scale during the Roman period, from about AD 75 on to AD 300 at least. Hydraulic mining methods preceded opencast and then deep mining at the site. The many opencast workings were produced by hushing and fire-setting in Roman Wales. The workings were initially under military control with a small Roman fort under the present village of Pumsaint. The workings have yielded large amounts of late Roman pottery (AD 77 to later than AD 300) from the reservoir known as "Melin-y-milwyr" or soldiers mill.

The Dolaucothi mine is open to the public under the aegis of the National Trust. Visitors can explore the many surface features at the site, as well as be escorted on a tour of the extensive underground workings.

== North Wales ==
=== Gwynfynydd ===
The Gwynfynydd Gold Mine in Dolgellau closed in January 1999. In January 2007 the BBC and other news organisations reported that the final traces of "economically extractable" gold had been removed from the mines and surrounding soil. Even the local road surface had been filtered for traces, marking the end of the current mining operation. Gwynfynydd was discovered in 1860. It was active until 1998 and has produced 45,000+ troy ounces of gold since 1884. Queen Elizabeth II was presented with a kilogram ingot of gold from Wales on her 60th birthday (21 April 1986) from this mine. In the 1990s the mine was open to the public and provided guided tours which included the opportunity to pan for gold. The mine closed because of health and safety issues and because of changing pollution-control legislation which would have made the owners liable for the quality of the mine discharge into the river Afon Mawddach had the mine remained open.

In 2016 the Welsh gold jewellery firm Clogau purchased Gwynfynydd, seventeen years after the mine had ceased to operate.

=== Clogau ===
Another gold mine lies nearby, the Clogau mine. The Clogau Gold Mine (also known as the Clogau St David's Mine) was once the largest and richest of all the gold mines in the Dolgellau area. It is in Bontddu, near Barmouth in Gwynedd in North West Wales.

After producing copper and a little lead for quite a number of years, the mine developed into gold production in the 1862 'rush' and continued as a major operator until 1911, during which 165,031 tons of gold ore were mined resulting in 78,507 troy ounces (2,441.8 kg) of gold.

It worked the St David's lode of Clogau mountain alongside the co-owned Vigra Mine. Since 1911 the mine has been re-opened several times for smaller-scale operations. It last closed in 1998.

In 1989 William Roberts, the founder of the Welsh jewellery brand Clogau, acquired the rights to mine and conducted a few years of small-scale mining at the Clogau St David's mine in Dolgellau before its eventual closure in 1998 due to the high costs of extraction and the diminishing quantities of worthwhile gold being found.

== Occurrence ==
Welsh gold forms in veins or lodes of ore that yield up to 30 troy ounces per long ton (920 g/Mg). In comparison, South African gold ore yields just a quarter of a troy ounce for every tonne mined (8 g/Mg). However the South African gold fields are vastly more extensive.

== Patronage ==
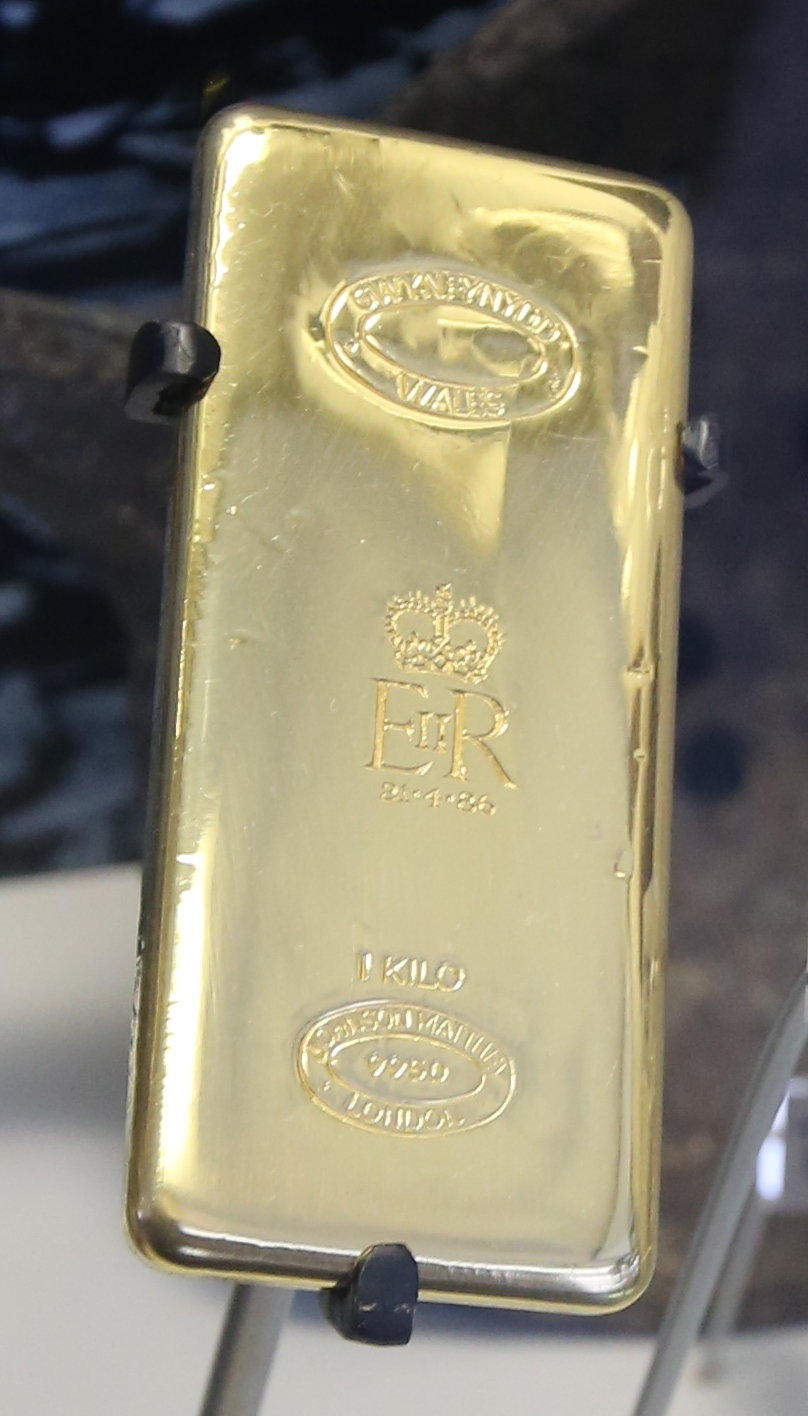
1kg of gold from Gwynfynydd Gold Mine that was presented to Queen Elizabeth II in 1986

The link between Welsh gold and the British royal family began on 13 July 1911 when Prince Edward (later King Edward VIII) was officially invested as Prince of Wales in a ceremony at Caernarfon Castle on the edge of Snowdonia, North Wales. The regalia used at the investiture consisted of a coronet, a rod, a ring, a sword and a mantle with doublet and sash which incorporated Welsh gold. The investiture took place at the initiative of the Welsh politician and future prime minister David Lloyd George, who invented a ceremony in the style of a Welsh pageant, and coached Edward to speak a few words in the Welsh language. On 1 July 1969 Prince Charles was invested at Caernarfon Castle. The ceremony was an update of the 1911 investiture, and the same regalia was used.

Welsh gold has been used to create wedding rings for some members of the royal family. Elizabeth Bowes-Lyon used a Welsh gold ring in her marriage to Prince Albert (later King George VI) on 26 April 1923. Queen Elizabeth II's wedding ring was crafted from Welsh gold from the Clogau mine. Other members of the royal family to have Welsh gold wedding rings include Princess Anne (1973), Diana, Princess of Wales (1981), Charles III (then Prince of Wales; 1981 and 2005), Queen Camilla (then Camilla Parker Bowles; 2005), Catherine, Princess of Wales (2011), Meghan, Duchess of Sussex (2018) and Princess Eugenie (2018).

== See also ==
- Irish gold
- Scottish gold
