= Dolgellau =

Town in Gwynedd, Wales

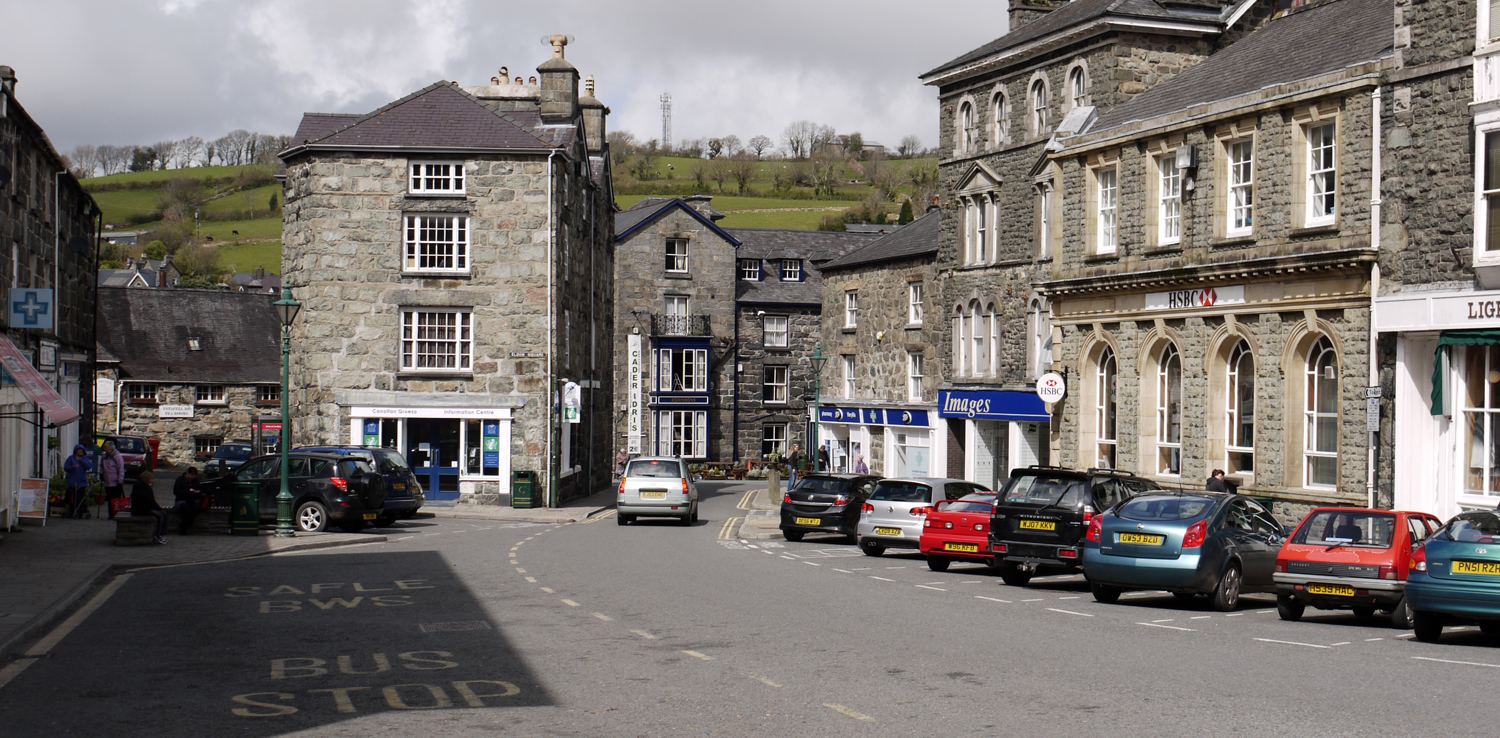
- Eldon Square, Dolgellau

- Location within Gwynedd
- Population: 2,688 (2011 census)
- OS grid reference: SH728178
- Community: Dolgellau
- Principal area: Gwynedd
- Preserved county: Gwynedd
- Country: Wales
- Sovereign state: United Kingdom
- Post town: DOLGELLAU
- Postcode district: LL40
- Dialling code: 01341
- Police: North Wales
- Fire: North Wales
- Ambulance: Welsh
- UK Parliament: Dwyfor Meirionnydd
- Senedd Cymru – Welsh Parliament: Gwynedd Maldwyn
- List of places UK Wales Gwynedd 52°44′35″N 03°53′08″W Map of the community

Dolgellau (/dɒlˈɡɛhlaɪ/; Welsh: [dɔlˈɡɛɬaɨ]) is a town and community in Gwynedd, north-west Wales, lying on the River Wnion, a tributary of the River Mawddach. It was the traditional county town of the historic county Merionethshire until the county Gwynedd was created in 1974. Dolgellau is the main base for climbers of Cadair Idris and Mynydd Moel which are visible from the town. Dolgellau is the second-largest settlement in southern Gwynedd, after Tywyn, and includes the community Penmaenpool. In 2021 the population dropped to 2,602.

== Toponymy ==
The name Dolgellau is a compound of dôl 'water-meadow' and cellau, the plural of cell 'cell', giving the meaning 'water-meadow of cells'. The dôl in the name was probably located within a bend at the confluence of the rivers Wnion and Aran. The cellau may refer to monastic cells or merchant's stalls.

The earliest recorded spelling (from 1254) is Dolkelew, and a spelling Dolgethleu dates from 1294–5 (the thl is an attempt to represent Welsh /ɬ/). Owain Glyndŵr's scribe wrote Dolguelli.

The town's name was commonly anglicised as Dolgelly or Dolgelley. Up until the 19th century most spellings in English were along the lines of Dôlgelly, Dolgelley, Dolgelly or Dolgelli. Thomas Pennant used the form Dolgelleu in his Tours of Wales, and this was the form used in the Church Registers in 1723, although it never had much currency.

In 1825 the Registers have Dolgellau, which was the form adopted by Robert Vaughan of Hengwrt in 1836. This became standard in Welsh and later also in English.

The official name for the urban district which covered the town and the surrounding rural district was changed from Dolgelley to Dolgellau in 1958 by Merioneth County Council, following requests from both district councils.

== History and economy ==
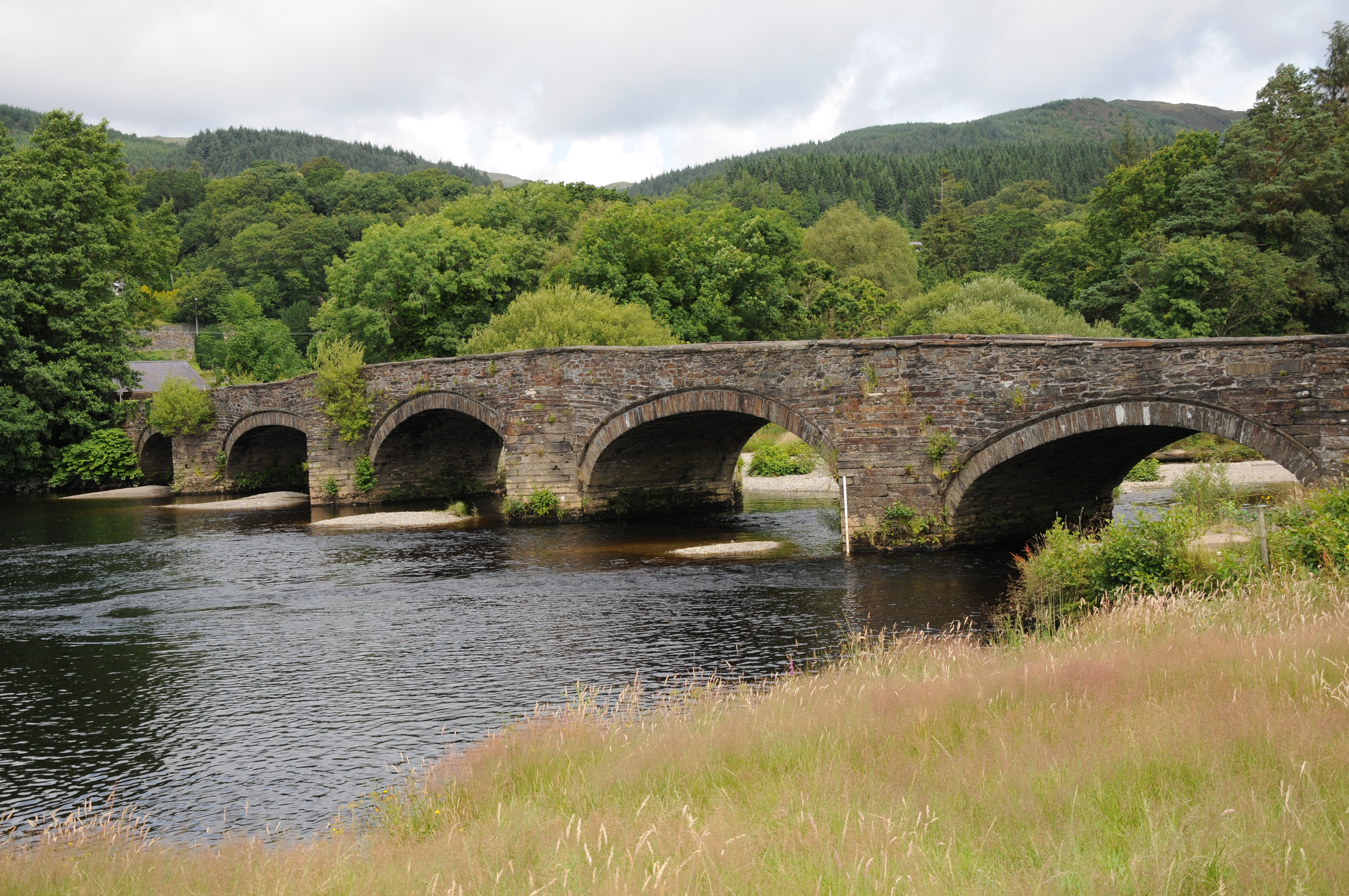
Bridge over River Mawddach at Llanelltyd

The site of Dolgellau was, in the pre-Roman Celtic period, part of the tribal lands of the Ordovices, who were conquered by the Romans in AD 77–78. Although a few Roman coins from the reigns of Emperors Hadrian and Trajan have been found near Dolgellau, the area is marshy and there is no evidence that it was settled during the Roman period. There are, however, three hill forts in the vicinity of Dolgellau, of uncertain origin.

After the Romans left, the area came under the control of the petty Kingdom of Meirionnydd, ruled by the descendants of Meirion ap Tybion ap Cunedda Wledig which was later consumed by the medieval Kingdom of Gwynedd, and made into a cantref. However, Dolgellau was probably not inhabited until the late 11th or 12th century, when it was established as a "serf village" (or maerdref), possibly by Cadwgan ap Bleddyn. Dolgellau was in the Cantref or 'hundred' of Meirionnydd and the Cwmwd or 'commote' of Tal-y-bont. It remained a serf village until the reign of Henry VII (1485–1509).

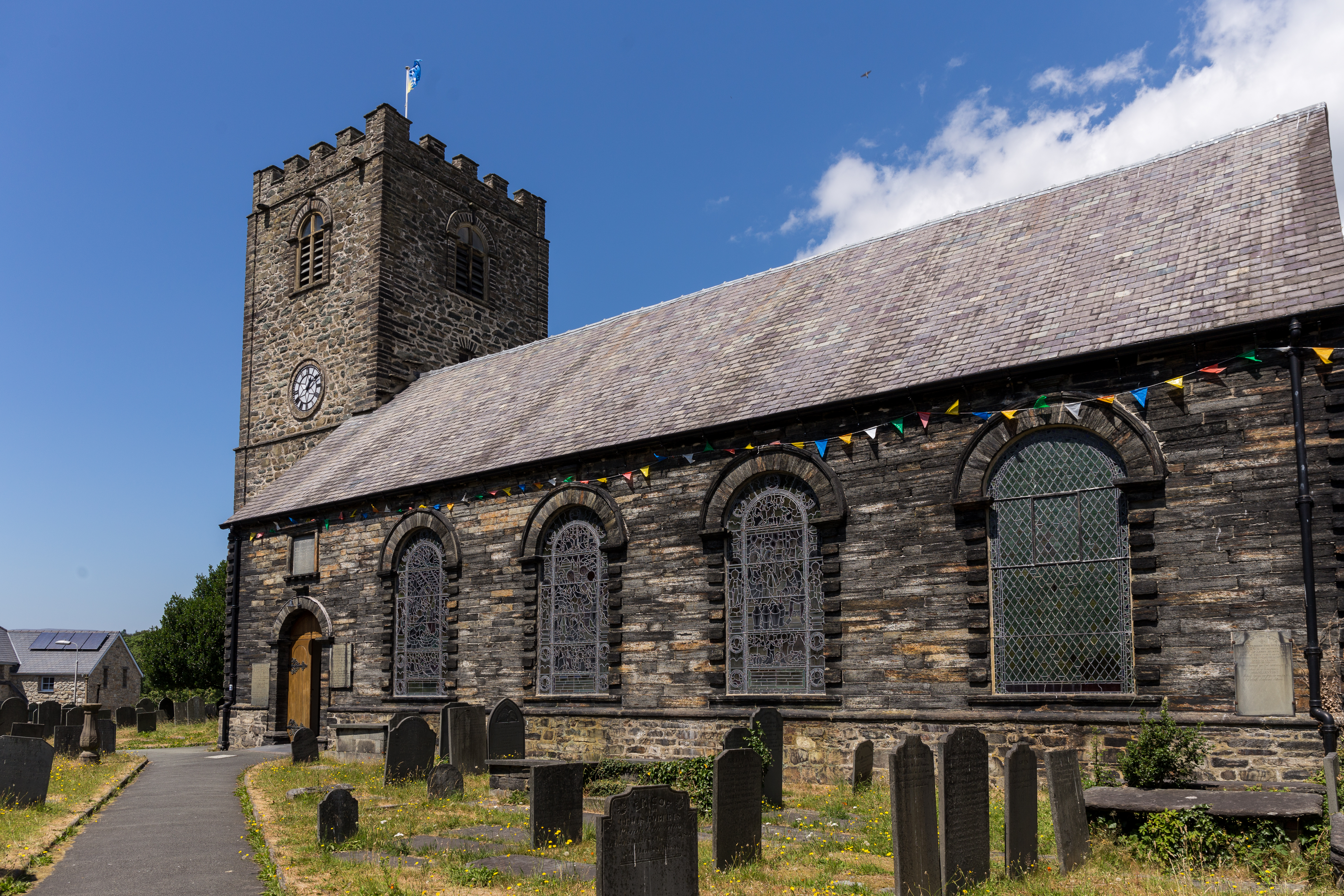
St Mary's Church.

A church was built in the 12th century (demolished and replaced by the present building in 1716), although Cymer Abbey, founded in 1198 in nearby Llanelltyd, remained the most important religious centre locally. Dolgellau gained in importance from this period onwards, and was mentioned in the Survey of Merioneth ordered by Edward I (Llanelltyd was not). In 1404 it was the location of a council of nobles under Owain Glyndŵr, where he dispatched his chancellor Gruffydd Young and his brother-in-law John Hanmer (son of David Hanmer) as ambassadors to the Kingdom of France. Part of the house where this assembly took place is still standing and known by the name of Plas yn Dref

After a visit by George Fox in 1657, many inhabitants of Dolgellau converted to Quakerism. Persecution led a large number of them to emigrate to Pennsylvania in 1686, under the leadership of Rowland Ellis, a local gentleman-farmer. The Pennsylvanian town of Bryn Mawr, home to a prestigious women's liberal arts college, is named after Ellis's farm near Dolgellau.

The woollen industry was long of the greatest importance to the town's economy; by the end of the 18th century, output was reckoned to be worth £50,000 to £100,000 annually. The industry declined in the first half of the 19th century, owing to the introduction of mechanical looms. Another important contributor to the local economy was tanning, which continued into the 1980s in Dolgellau, though on a much reduced scale.

The town was the centre of a minor gold rush in the 19th century. At one time the local gold mines employed over 500 workers. Clogau St. David's mine in Bontddu and Gwynfynydd mine in Ganllwyd have supplied gold for many royal weddings.

Dolgellau was the county town of Merionethshire (Welsh: Meirionydd, Sir Feirionnydd) until 1974 when, following the Local Government Act 1972, it became the administrative centre of Meirionnydd, a district of the county of Gwynedd. This was abolished in 1996 by the Local Government (Wales) Act 1994.

Today, the economy of Dolgellau relies chiefly on tourism (see below), although agriculture still plays a role; a farmers' market is held in the town centre on the third Sunday of every month.

It is believed that Dolgellau Cricket Club, founded in 1869 by Frederick Temple, is one of the oldest cricket clubs in Wales.

For nearly a century Dolgellau was the home of Dr Williams School, a pioneering girls' secondary school. This was funded from the legacy of Daniel Williams the Welsh nonconformist of the 17th/18th century.

Shortly before the closure of the town's railway station it displayed signs reading variously Dolgelly, Dolgelley and Dolgellau.

== Education ==
Dolgellau is home to a bilingual further education college, Coleg Meirion-Dwyfor. The site it occupies was originally home to Dr Williams' School, a direct grant grammar school for girls aged 7–18 established in 1875 (opened 1878). It was named after its benefactor Daniel Williams, (1643–1716) a Nonconformist minister from Wrexham, who also gave his name to Dr Williams's Library in Euston, London. The school closed in 1975.

Dolgellau Grammar School, a boys' school, had been established in 1665 by the then Rector of Dolgellau, John Ellis, at Pen Bryn (now demolished), before moving to its present site on the Welshpool road. In 1962, it became a comprehensive school under the name Ysgol y Gader ("School of the Chair", in reference to the mountain Cadair Idris, whose name translates as "Idris's Chair").

On 1 September 2017, Ysgol Y Gader amalgamated with the village's primary school and seven other schools in the area to become a new middle school for pupils aged 3–16. The combined schools were named Ysgol Bro Idris. As of 2019, there were 581 pupils on roll. 229 of those pupils are of secondary school age and 352 of those pupils are of primary school age. The area school is located across six sites, with two of those sites located within Dolgellau itself.

The school is categorised linguistically by Welsh Government as a category 2A school, meaning that at least 80% of subjects, apart from English and Welsh, are taught only through the medium of Welsh to all pupils.

== Literary connections ==
Near Dolgellau is the house of Hengwrt, whose 17th-century owner Robert Vaughan (?1592–1667) kept an extensive library. This was home to numerous manuscript treasures, including the Book of Aneirin, the Book of Taliesin, the Black Book of Carmarthen, the White Book of Rhydderch and the Hengwrt manuscript. The Hengwrt manuscripts (not including the Book of Aneirin, taken from Hengwrt in the 1780s) form the majority of the collection now known as the Peniarth Manuscripts, held at the National Library of Wales.

In 1971 John Elwyn Jones, a retired teacher who had taught Russian, German and Welsh at Dr Williams School, published Pum Cynnig i Gymro ("Five Tries for a Welshman"), an account of his time as a prisoner of war in Poland during the Second World War. The title of the book refers to the five attempts he made to escape, the last of which succeeded. The book was dramatised by S4C in 1997. In 1986 and 1987 John Elwyn published his autobiography in 3 volumes, called Yn Fy Ffordd Fy Hun ("In My Own Way"). These do not duplicate his prisoner of war adventures, but recount his upbringing in the area—he was born at Bryn Gwyn, less than a mile from the town—and subsequent return to the area after his years in the armed services. He died in September 2007.

Marion Eames, who was educated at Dr. Williams' School, lived in Dolgellau up to her death in 2007; she is probably best known for her book The Secret Room (originally published in Welsh as Y Stafell Ddirgel), a semi-fictional account of the events leading up to the 1686 emigration of Quakers from Dolgellau. It was dramatised by S4C in 2001.

== Local attractions ==
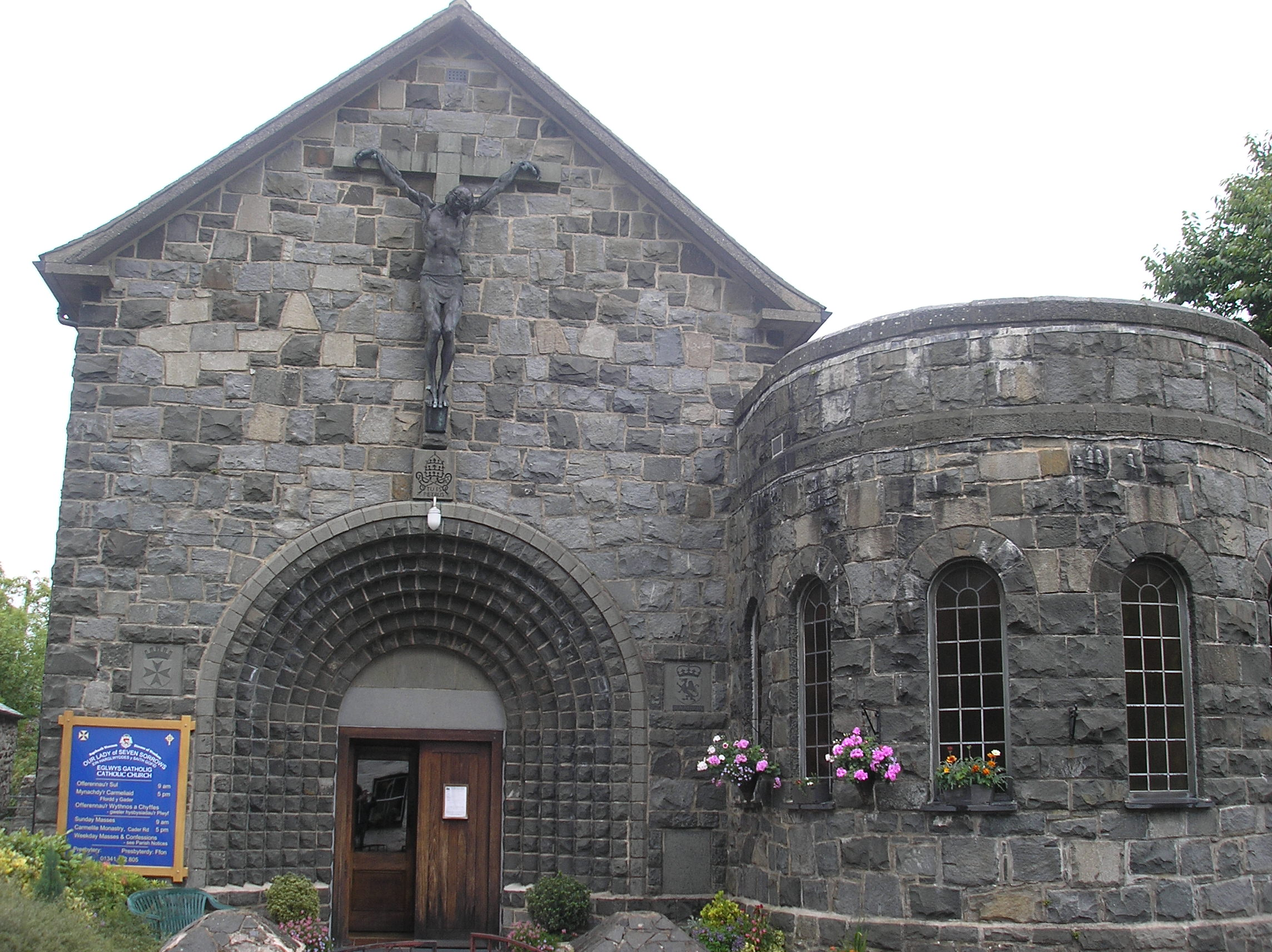
Our Lady of Seven Sorrows Church

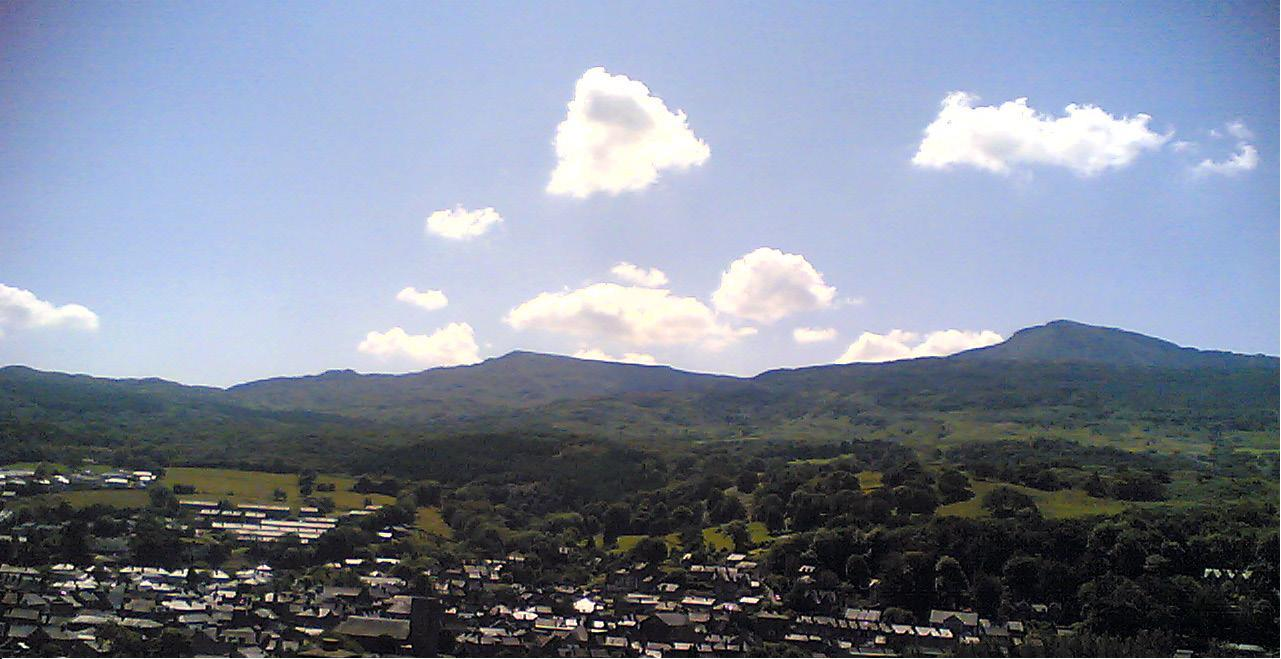
Dolgellau and Mynydd Moel

The surrounding area is known for its wild but beautiful countryside and places of historical interest. It is popular with tourists who enjoy activities such as walking, hiking, horse riding, white-water rafting and climbing. Dolgellau is the main base for climbers of Cadair Idris. Aircraft enthusiasts also use the town as the base for the Mach Loop. To the north lies the Dolmelynllyn estate, which includes walking routes that include Rhaeadr Ddu waterfall and the former gold mines on Cefn Coch.

The Great Western Railway line from Ruabon to Llangollen was extended via Corwen and Llanuwchllyn to Dolgellau, where it formed an end-on connection with the Cambrian Railways line from Barmouth Junction and a shared station was opened there in 1868. The Ruabon Barmouth line was closed in the 1960s under the Beeching Axe. The railway line was converted some years ago into the Llwybr Mawddach (or "Mawddach Trail") which now runs for some eight miles from Dolgellau to Morfa Mawddach railway station, near Fairbourne on the coast. It is maintained by the Snowdonia National Park and is very popular with walkers and cyclists. It passes some estuarine areas that are important for water birds.

The site of Dolgellau railway station itself, along with about 1.5 miles (2.4 km) of former trackbed, was used to construct the Dolgellau bypass in the late 1970s.

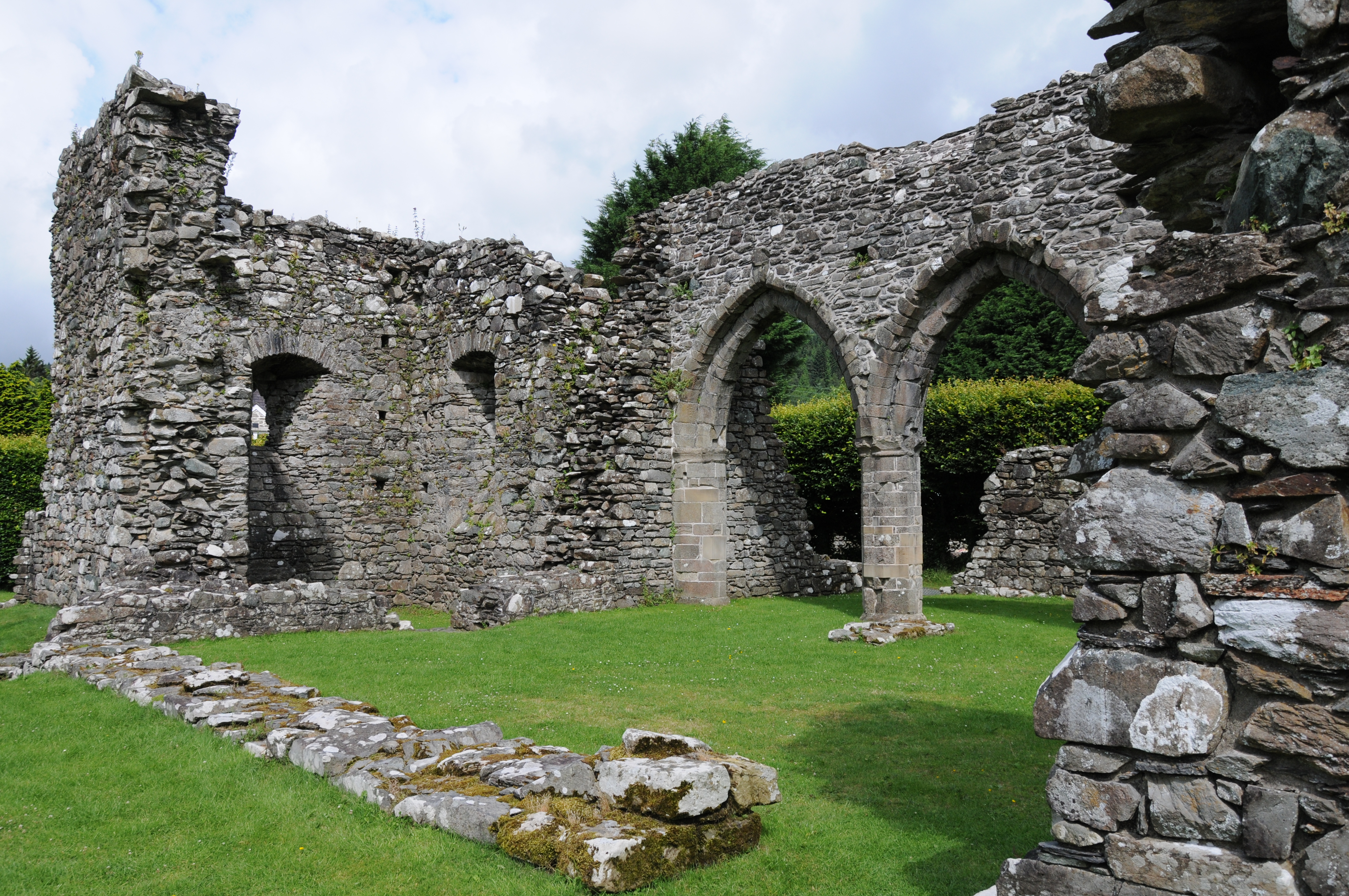
Cymer Abbey

Historical attractions, apart from the town itself, include the 12th century Cymer Abbey, a short walk from Dolgellau. The tourist information centre also has an exhibition on Quakers and there is a Quaker graveyard in the town. A field known as Camlan, in nearby Dinas Mawddwy, has been claimed as the site of the last battle of King Arthur (based on a mention of the name in the Annales Cambriae; see also Battle of Camlann).

Dolgellau is a good centre for visiting a number of nearby narrow-gauge heritage railways, including the Corris Railway, the Fairbourne Railway and the Talyllyn Railway.

== Cultural events ==
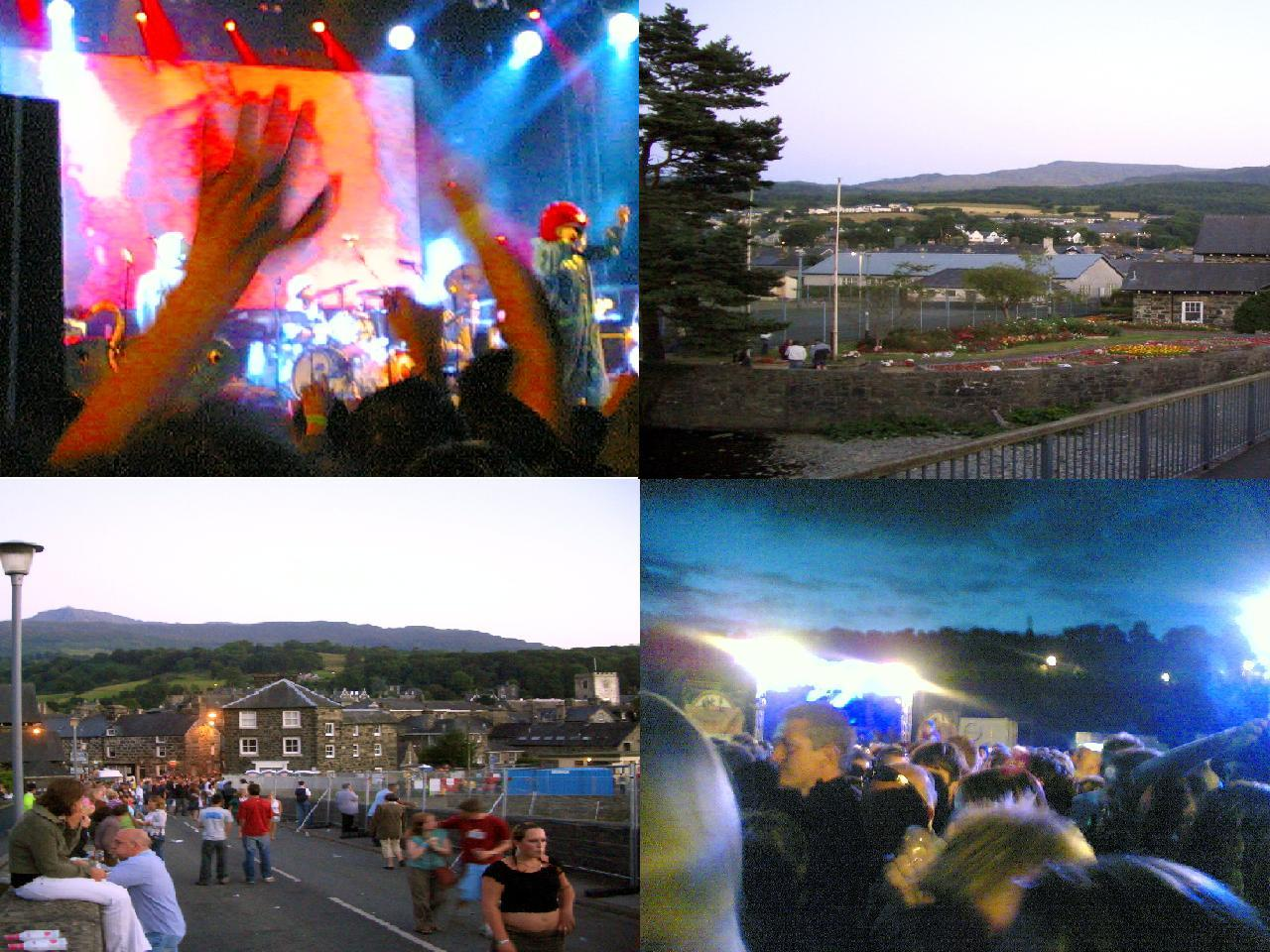
Sesiwn Fawr 2005

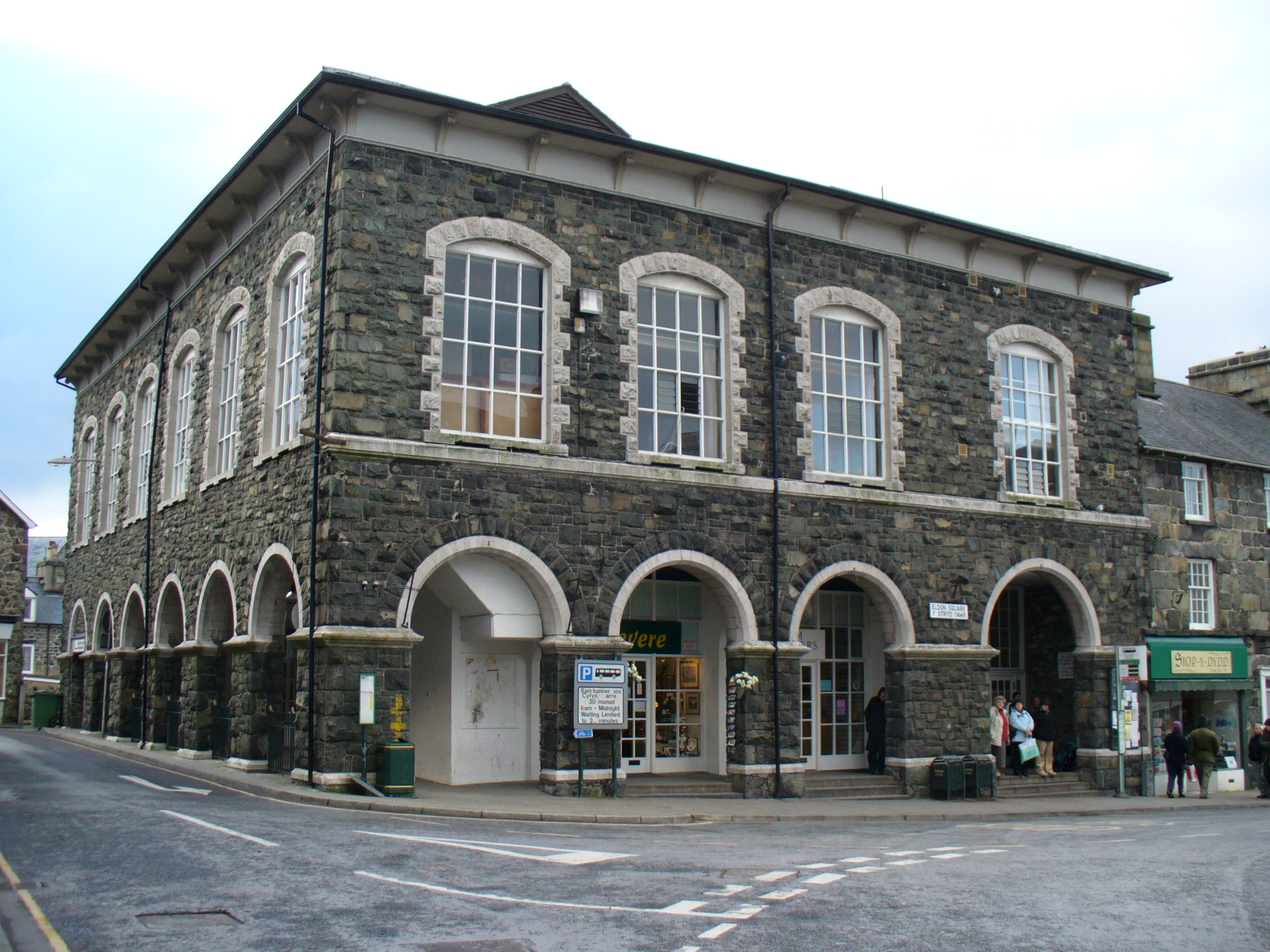
Neuadd Idris, the former town market hall and home to Tŷ Siamas

=== Sesiwn Fawr Dolgellau ===
From 1992 Dolgellau has held Sesiwn Fawr Dolgellau ("The Great Session of Dolgellau"), a world music festival. Originally free and held in the streets of the town, it grew too big for the centre of Dolgellau. Since 2002 it has been held on the outskirts of the town and admission is charged, which has allowed the organisers in recent years to book such acts as Bob Geldof, Genod droog, Cerys Matthews, Iwcs a Doyle, Meic Stevens, Super Furry Animals and Goldie Looking Chain. It attracted crowds of up to 5,000 every year and claimed to be one of Europe's biggest and best world music festivals. Since 1995 it has been broadcast live on BBC Radio Cymru and since 1997 on S4C. In March 2009 it was announced that there would be no Sesiwn Fawr in 2009, owing to debts of over £50,000, mostly the result of a wet event in 2007. Smaller musical events took place in pubs, etc., but the future format of the festival was put under review. The festival returned on a smaller scale in 2011, and has been organised annually since then.

=== Gwyl Cefn Gwlad ===
Every summer, Dolgellau is host to the Gŵyl Cefn Gwlad ("Festival of the Countryside"), a mix of agricultural show and fête.

=== Eisteddfod ===
In 1949 Dolgellau hosted the National Eisteddfod of Wales; in 1960 and 1994 it hosted the Urdd National Eisteddfod. The old market hall, Neuadd Idris, has hosted the National Centre for Folk Music, known as Tŷ Siamas.

== Twin-town ==
Dolgellau is twinned with Guérande (Breton: Gwenrann) in Brittany, France.

== Notable people ==
- Sir Robert Vaughan, 2nd Baronet (1768–1843), landowner and politician, MP for Merioneth for 40 years from 1792 to 1836.
- Thomas Richards (1800–1877), surgeon, author, journalist, editor
- Sir Cadwaladr Bryner Jones (1872–1954), agricultural educationist, was educated at Dolgellau Grammar School.
- Mary Morris (1873–1925), doctor, first female inspector of schools in Bath and suffragette.
- Mary Alice Eleanor Richards (1885–1977), botanist and prolific collector of Zambian plants.
- Anthony Hulme (1910–2007), film actor.
- Dilys Elwyn-Edwards (1918–2012), composer, lecturer and accompanist.
- Marion Eames (1921–2007), Welsh-language novelist, author of Y Stafell Ddirgel.
- Ioan Bowen Rees (1929–1999) Welsh-language poet, mountaineer and political activist.
- Alan Llwyd (born 1948), occasional bardic name 'Meilir Emrys Owen', prolific Welsh-language poet, literary critic and editor.
- Gwyndaf Evans (born 1959), rally driver, winner of the 1996 British Rally Championship.
- Martin Philips (born 1960), Welsh darts captain and 2014 World Masters champion.
- Elfyn Evans (born 1988), rally driver (son of Gwyndaf Evans), winner of the 2026 World Rally Championship

== See also ==
- Dolgelley power station
