= Gwynfynydd Gold Mine =

Gold mine near Dolgellau, Gwynedd, Wales

Coordinates: 52.8371°N 3.8784°W

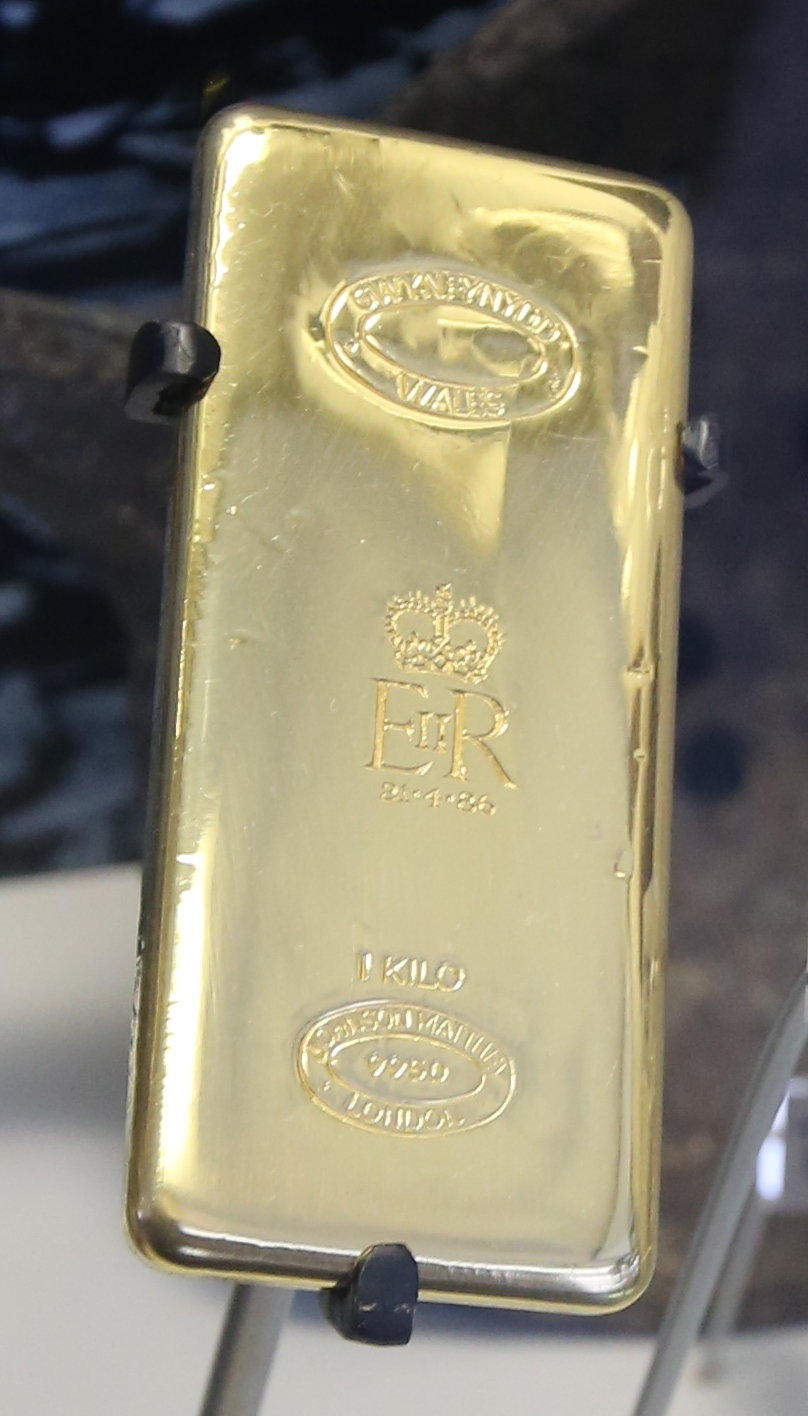
1kg of gold from Gwynfynydd Gold Mine that was presented to Queen Elizabeth II in 1986

Gwynfynydd Gold Mine is near Ganllwyd, Dolgellau, Gwynedd, Wales. The lode, which was discovered in 1860, was worked from 1884. It has produced more than 45,000 troy ounces of Welsh gold until mining ceased in 1998. The equivalent of 1,400 kg (£44,871,642 on 2017 markets).

== History ==
Gold was found in the Dolgellau area in the 1850s and a mining rush developed. The first gold was discovered at Gwynfynydd in 1863, but it was not until 1887 that the mine was developed commercially. By this time the mine had been acquired by William Pritchard Morgan, who was to become known as the "Welsh gold king", and who paid for two police constables to protect the mine.

By 1888, two hundred people were employed at the site, the gold being extracted by driving horizontal tunnels (adits) into the mountainside, with the miners working deep underground by candlelight. The machinery was powered by water wheels and water turbines. In contrast to other mines in the area where the gold was found in shallow deposits, the Gwynfynydd gold is extracted from large quartz veins deep underground.

== Uses ==
Gold from the Gwynfynydd Mine has been used in many modern awards. Notably, Gwynfynydd gold has been incorporated in the Glyndŵr Award. This medal has been awarded annually since 1995 by the Machynlleth Tabernacl Trust, for excellence in the arts in Wales. Recipients have included many outstanding Welsh artists, beginning with painter Sir Kyffin Williams in 1995.

In April 1986, Queen Elizabeth II was presented with a kilogram of Welsh gold from the mine to celebrate her 60th birthday.

== Gwynfynydd now ==
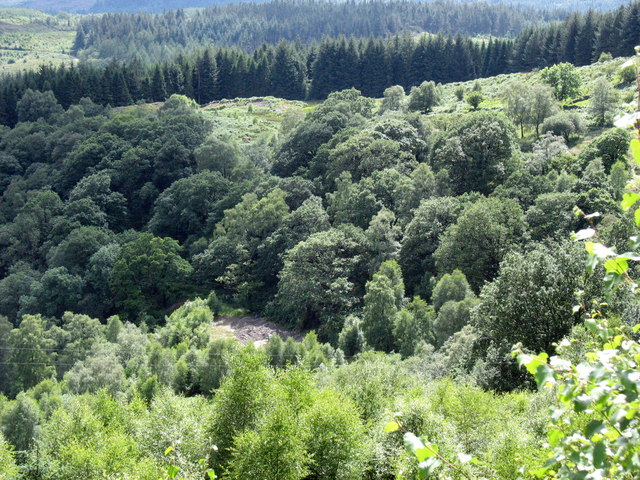
Spoil heaps among the woods - 2007

The mine closed because of Health and Safety law, which would have almost doubled the cost of sinking mine shafts and galleries, and because of changing pollution control legislation which would have made the owners liable for the quality of the mine discharge into the River Mawddach had the mine remained open.

The land surrounding Gwynfynydd Gold Mine was previously owned by Welsh Gold Plc, but has recently been acquired by Clogau Gold of Wales Ltd. Clogau purchased circa 80 acres of land surrounding the mine in mid-2013, giving them more control of Welsh gold production.

== See also ==
- Clogau
- Dolaucothi
