= Borthwnog =

Coordinates: 52.75356°N 3.94394°W

Borthwnog Hall is a grade II listed building in Llanelltyd, Wales. Originally built by a local shoe maker in the 17th century it was remodeled in the Georgian style around 1800.

It was the Manor House of the estate which encompassed the adjacent Borth farm and lands up the Taichynhaeaf valley and Bontddu. It is today a bed and breakfast.
