= Cullen, County Tipperary =

Cullen Cuilleann
- Village
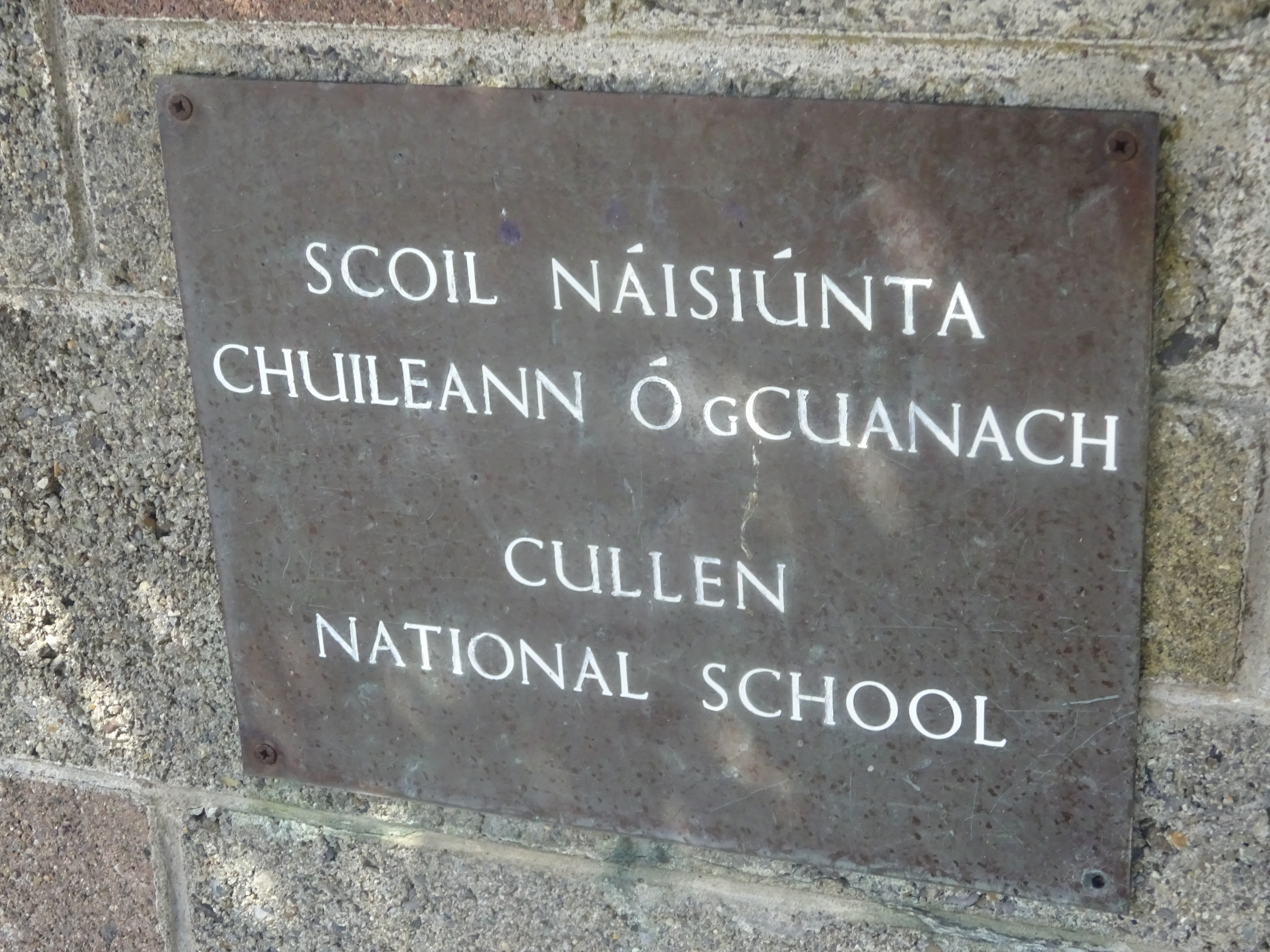
- Sign at Cullen national school with old Irish name Cuileann Ó gCuanach, "Cullen of the Cooneys"

- Location in Ireland
- Coordinates: 52°30′46″N 8°16′33″W
- Country: Ireland
- Province: Munster
- County: County Tipperary
- Elevation: 129 m (423 ft)

Population (2016)
  - Total: 289
- (Cullen Electoral Division)
- Time zone: UTC±0 (WET)
  - Summer (DST): UTC+1 (IST)
- Eircode: E34
- Telephone area code: 062
- Irish Grid Reference: R812401

Cullen (Irish: Cuilleann) is a rural village in County Tipperary, Ireland. The centre of the village is located at a junction of two roads in south Tipperary, 9 km north-east of Tipperary town. These roads lead to Monard, Lattin, the "Rocky Road" and Oola respectively. The village is in a townland and civil parish of the same name.

== Name ==
The village was traditionally believed to have taken its name from the holly (cuileann), although an Irish legend claimed that Fionn Mac Cumhail killed a hero named Cuileann, son of Morna at this site in the 3rd century AD. Another possible derivation is cuilleann, 'steep unbroken slope' – the village is dominated by a sloping road.

== Amenities ==
Cullen is home to a public house (pub), a cemetery and a Roman Catholic church. This church is dedicated to Saint Patrick and was built c. 1845.

Just outside the village, on the road approaching Oola, County Limerick, is St. Patrick's Well. This is still accessible, and was an important source of fresh water for local residents before the gradual advent of domestic plumbing became common from the mid-20th century.

Cullen–Lattin soccer pitch is the venue for the Cullen–Lattin soccer team. It is called this because the villages of Cullen and Lattin (approx. 4 miles from Cullen) are joined as one parish in the Archdiocese of Cashel and Emly.

== Sport ==
The Gaelic Athletic Association affiliations of the joint parish is concentrated in the village of Lattin; the team called Lattin–Cullen (to differentiate with the soccer team Cullen–Lattin).

Cullen is also part of the shooting club known as "E.L.C.O. Gun Club" (Emly, Lattin, Cullen, Oola Gun club). This gun club is open for membership to residents and former residents of the lands within the E.L.C.O. area.

== Archaeology ==
In the 18th and 19th centuries many prehistoric items were found in the nearby Golden Bog of Cullen. It is possible that the finds were votive offerings from the Bronze Age. Also nearby is Longstone Rath, an Iron Age ringfort.

== People ==
Nicky English, the former Tipperary hurler and manager, was born and raised in Cullen, living in what was a small shop run by his parents.

== See also ==
- List of towns and villages in Ireland
