= Irish gold =

Gold in Ireland

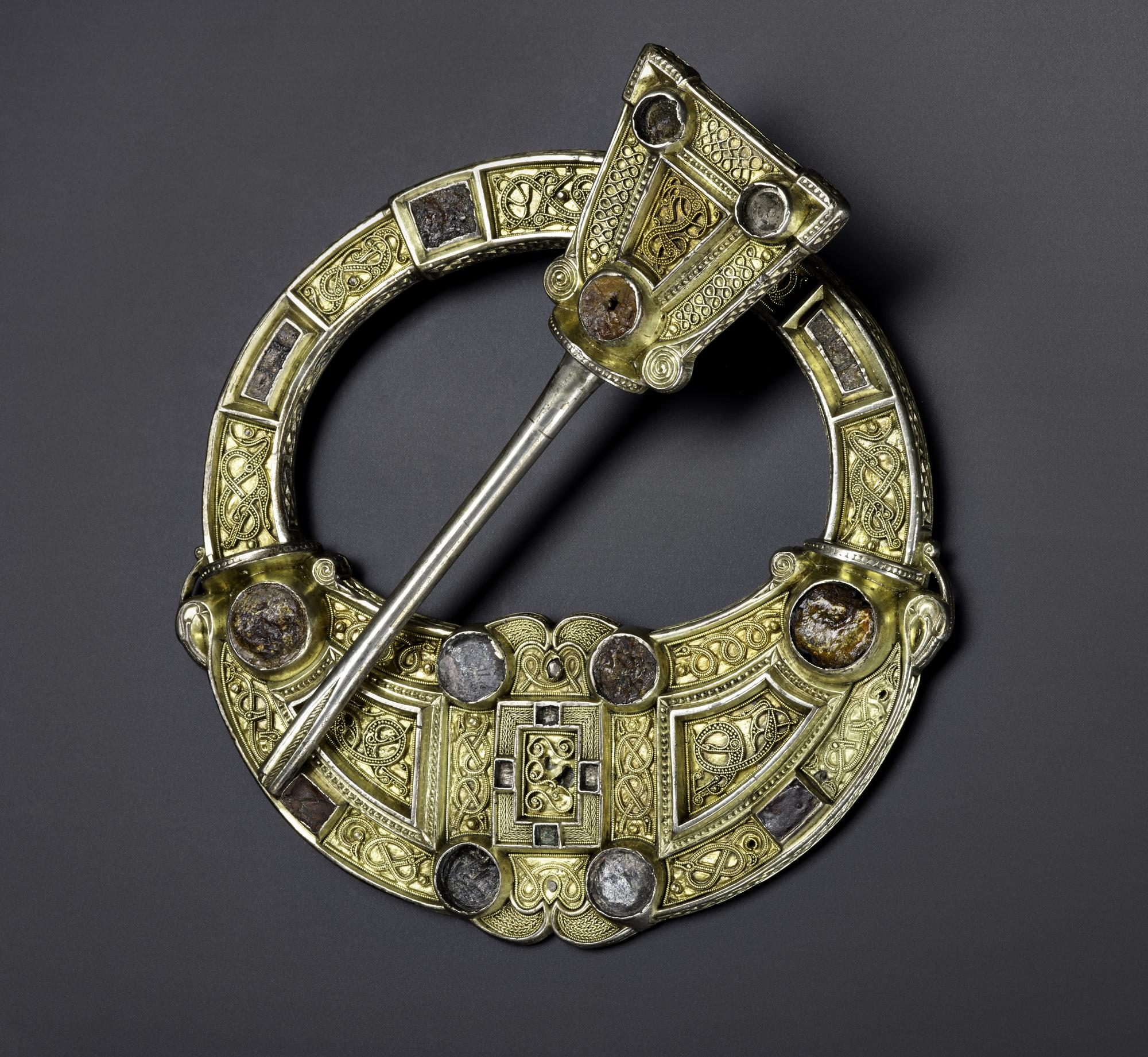
Hunterston Brooch, c. 7th century AD

Irish gold is gold that occurs naturally in areas of Ireland. Ireland was one of the major areas of gold working in Bronze Age western Europe. Irish gold is especially well known from the Irish Bronze Age as jewellery, in the form of gold lunulae, torcs, gorgets and rings.

== History ==
The first gold was produced in Ireland c. 2500 BC during the late Neolithic/Atlantic Bronze Age. Sun discs and lunulae were produced from hammered gold. Lead-isotope and major-element analyses have shown this gold to mostly be from Cornwall, also a major ancient source of tin. In return, Irish copper was exchanged for this foreign gold. Around 1200 BC torcs began to be produced using new techniques. From 900 BC bracelets, dress-fasteners, sheet gold collars and ear-spools were made in Ireland.

== Occurrence ==
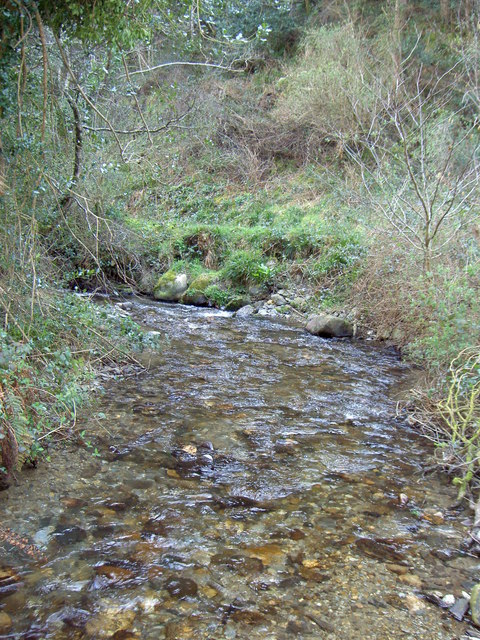
Goldmines River, County Wicklow.

A likely source for Irish gold is placer mining in Ireland's rivers, including the rivers of County Wicklow and the "Gold Coast" of County Waterford. Other likely ancient sources based on placenames include Slieveanore ("Gold Mountain", County Clare), Tullynore ("Gold Hillock", County Down), Coomanore ("Gold Hollow", County Cork), Luganore ("Gold Hollow", County Tipperary) and Glenanore ("Gold Valley", County Cork). Note that the Golden Vale is not named for the metal, but for its high quality soil; the town of Golden, County Tipperary takes its name from the Irish gabhailín, "river fork"; and Shanagolden, County Limerick is from seanghualainn, "old shoulder".

All gold in the ground in the Republic of Ireland is the property of the state. Recreational gold panning is permitted, but the gold cannot be sold and finds of over 20 flakes or 2 grams (0.064 ozt) must be reported.

A gold rush occurred in County Wicklow in the 1790s centred around the Goldmines River. Between 1796 and 1860 about 300 kilograms (9,600 ozt) of gold was mined in Ireland in total, from places including the Goldmines River, County Wicklow.

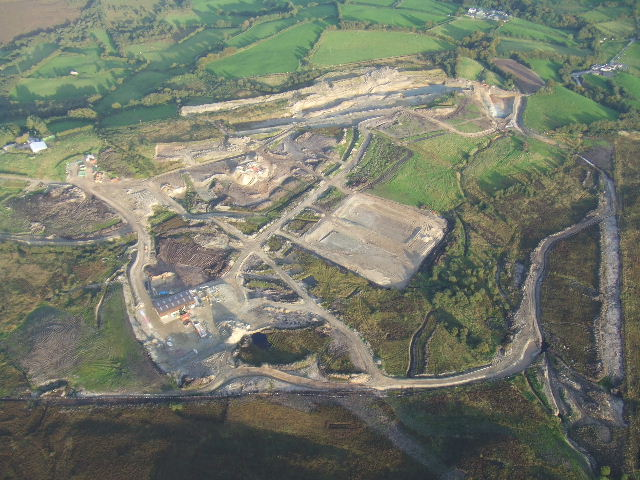
Gold mine at Cavanacaw, Northern Ireland, opened in 2008.

In 2008 a major discovery was announced near Clontibret, estimated at 500,000 troy ounces (16,000 kg). The mining is run by Conroy Gold and Natural Resources and Anglo Asian Mining. Total resources could be as high as 20,000,000 troy ounces (620 t).

== See also ==
- Gold working in the Bronze Age British Isles
- Welsh gold
- Golden Bog of Cullen
