= Tŷ Siamas =

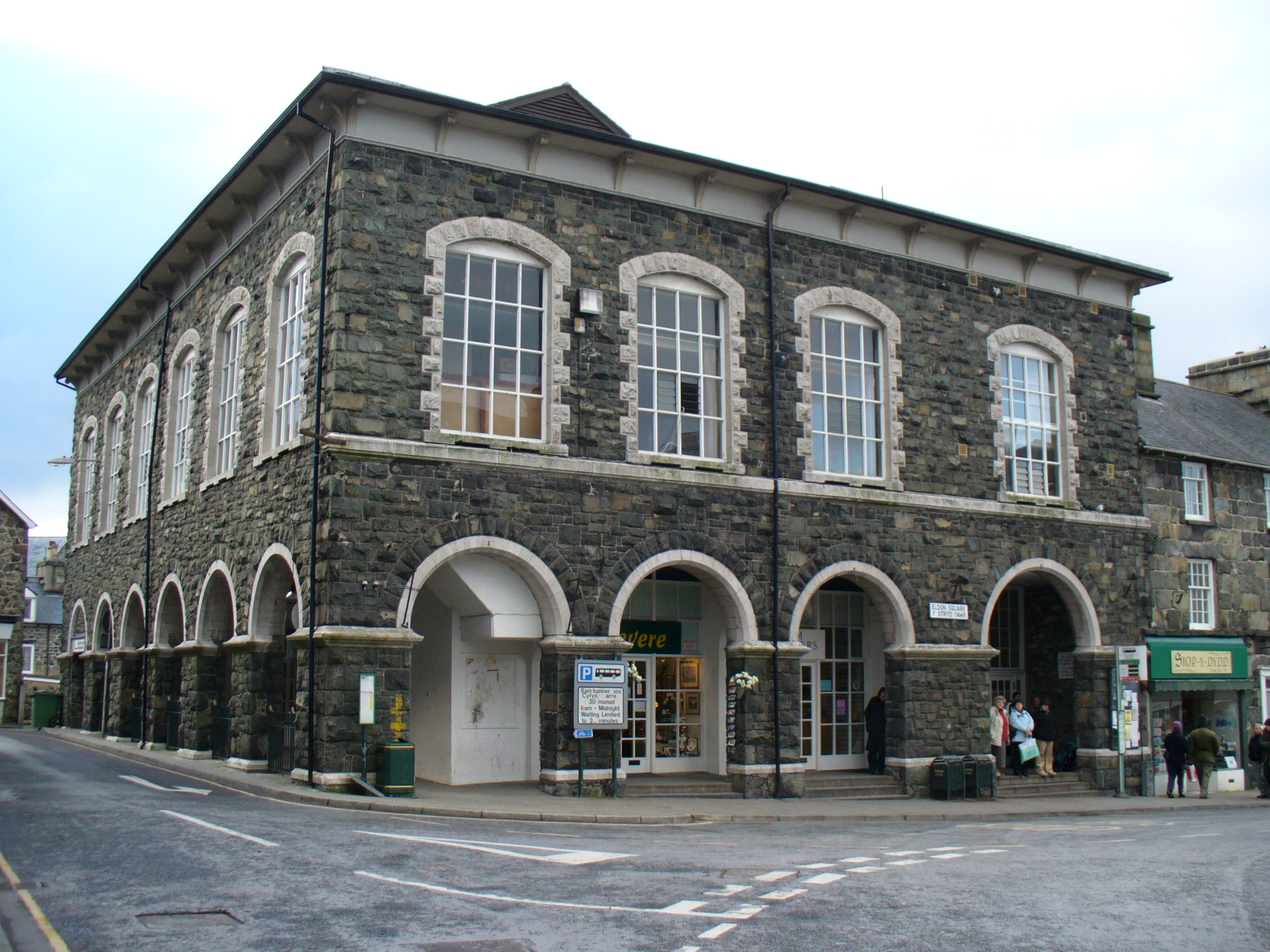
- Neuadd Idris, former town market hall and home to Tŷ Siamas

- Location within Gwynedd
- Established: 2007
- Location: Dolgellau, Gwynedd, Wales
- Coordinates: 52.74237°N 3.88576°W
- Type: Music museum
- Website: Tŷ Siamas

Tŷ Siamas is the "National Centre for Folk Music" in Wales, and is situated in Dolgellau. The initiative to create such a centre was led by Ywain Myfyr (chairman and a founder of Sesiwn Fawr Dolgellau), and the project was managed by Mabon ap Gwynfor. The concept was "to establish a centre for music and cultural activities for the benefit of the community and visitors."

The site selected to accommodate the centre was the old market hall in the town, Neuadd Idris. The project, which was financed by Gwynedd Council through their local regeneration fund and community support fund, regional aid from the European Union, as well as funding from the Welsh Government and from Cronfa Arbrofol Eryri, cost £1.2 million. Following extensive renovation of the building, the centre opened to the public in June 2007. It was named after an 18th-century harpist, Elis Sion Siamas, and initially housed an interactive exhibition, which allowed visitors to experience Welsh music, but this was closed down due to lack of interest.

The centre was criticized by the public accounts committee of the Senedd in July 2013 because, despite the use of £1.2 million of public money, just two part-time jobs had been created.

A new music-inspired mural was unveiled in July 2021.

== See also ==
- List of music museums
