= Longstone Rath =

Ringfort in County Tipperary, Ireland

- Ráth na Cloiche Fada (Irish)
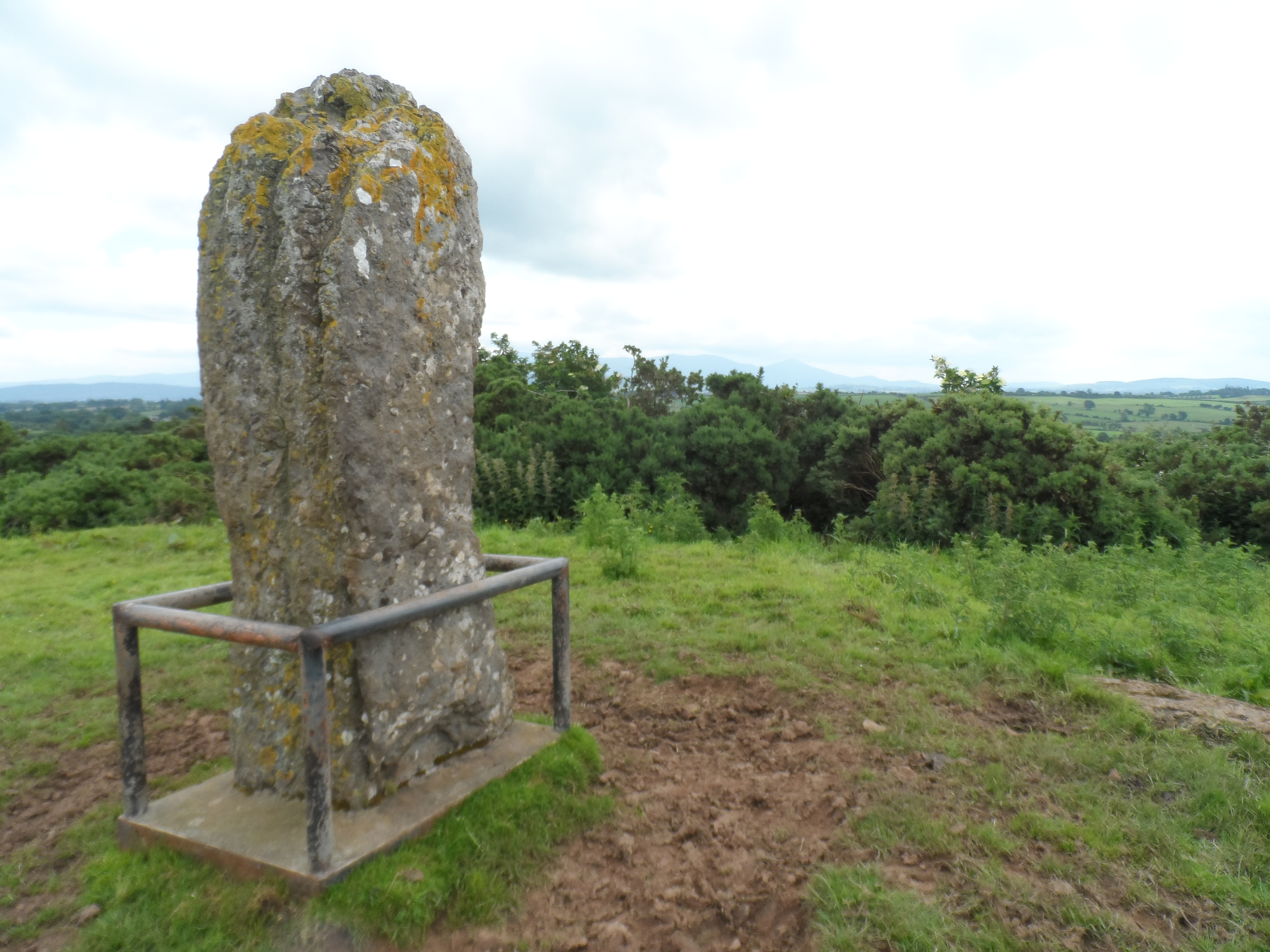
- Longstone viewed in situ.

- Location within Ireland
- 52.506051°N 8.297753°W
- Periods: Iron Age
- Location: Longstone, Cullen, County Tipperary, Ireland
- Region: Munster

History
- Built: 1 AD

Site notes
- Material: earth, limestone
- Area: 2,400 m^{2} (0.59 acres)
- Diameter: 55 m (60 yd)
- Excavation dates: 1973–76

Designations
- Designation: National Monument

Longstone Rath (Irish: Ráth na Cloiche Fada) is a ringfort (rath) and National Monument located in County Tipperary, Ireland.

== Location ==
Longstone Rath is located on a height overlooking the Barna–Emly road, 1.6 km (0.99 mi) west-southwest of Cullen.

== History and archaeology ==
The longstone, a lump of limestone about 2.3 m (7 ft 7 in) in height, is located on a mound within a bivallate ringfort. The site was excavated in 1973–76 by P. Danaher, where 4,000 potsherds, 6 complete vessels, over 400 flint scrapers, cremated bones and grooved ware pottery were found. The mound is thought to date from c. AD 1 (mid-Iron Age), with the rath being added about AD 600. According to Prof. Peter Danaher, Carrowkeel-style bowls from the complex site at Longstone seem to indicate a transitory camp of passage-tomb folk, and the hilltop was also used by Beaker, Food Vessel and Urn peoples, indicating that the site was a "halting site" for many thousands of years before the longstone and rath were made. Nearby is Cullen Bog in which votive offerings were placed including many gold and bronze artefacts.
