= Neuadd Idris =

Municipal Building in Dolgellau, Wales

Old Market Hall
- Neuadd Idris (Welsh)
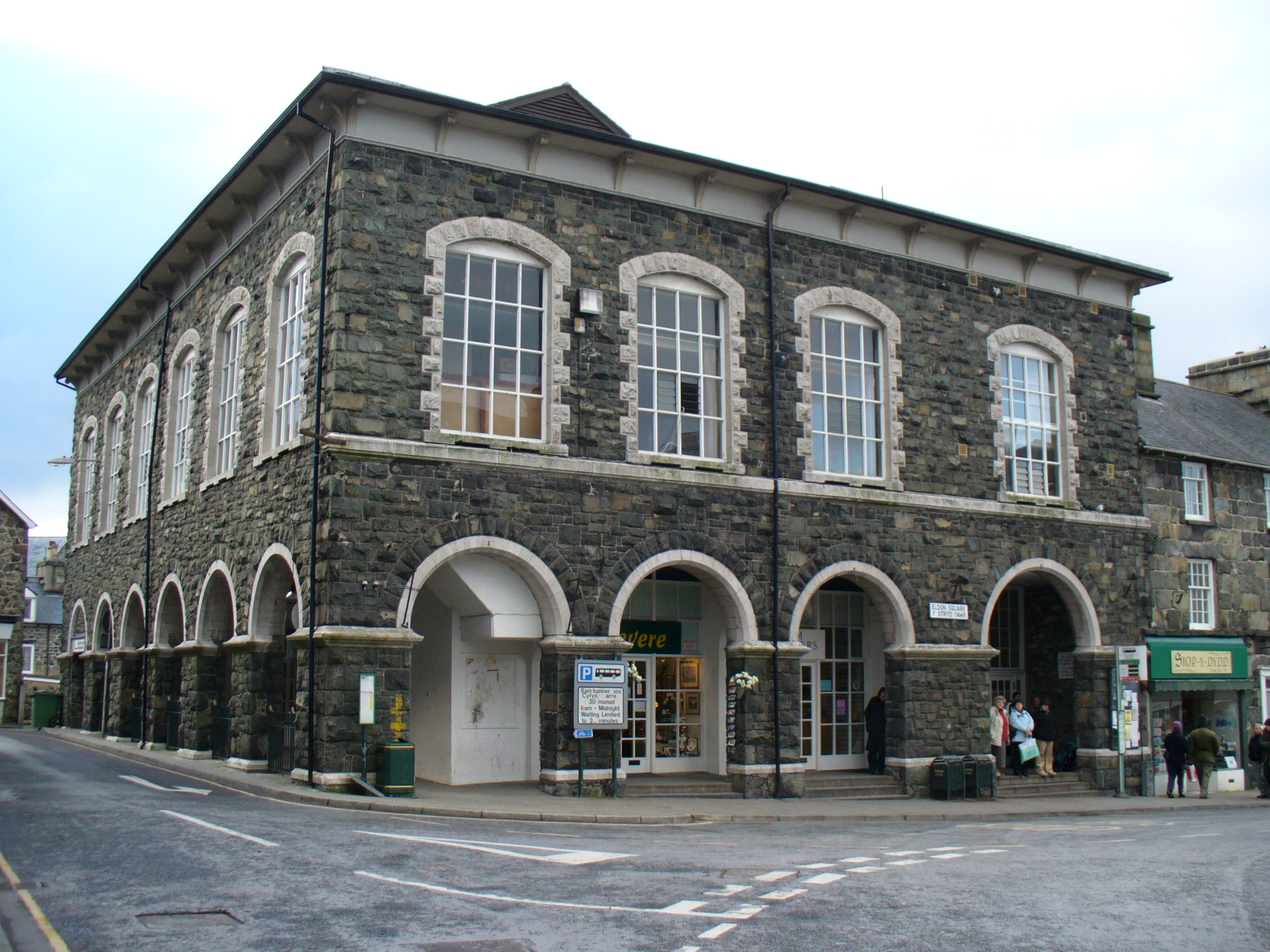
- Old Market Hall

- Shown in Gwynedd
- 52.7424°N 3.8858°W
- Location: Eldon Square, Dolgellau

History
- Built: 1870

Site notes
- Architect: William Henry Spaull
- Architectural style: Neoclassical style

Listed Building – Grade II
- Official name: Neuadd Idris (former Market Hall)
- Designated: 19 June 1990
- Reference no.: 4963

The Old Market Hall (Welsh: Neuadd Idris) is a municipal building in Eldon Square, Dolgellau, Gwynedd, Wales. The structure, which is now the home to the National Centre for Folk Music, known as Tŷ Siamas, is a Grade II listed building.

== History ==
The market square in Dolgellau was laid out by the local member of parliament, Sir Robert Vaughan in the early 19th century. However, while his masterplan included a courthouse, a school and a prison, it was not until the mid-19th century that civic officials decided to commission a market house. The site they selected was on the west side of the market square, which was renamed Eldon Square after the former Lord Chancellor, Lord Eldon, who had been a close friend of Vaughan.

The new building was designed by William Henry Spaull of Oswestry in the neoclassical style, built in rubble masonry and was completed in 1870. It was arcaded on the ground floor, so that markets could be held, with assembly rooms on the first floor. The design involved a symmetrical main frontage with four bays facing onto Eldon Square. There were four openings with impost bands and voussoirs on the ground floor and four segmental windows on the first floor. At roof level, there were deeply overhanging eaves supported by brackets.

During the First World War, the building was requisitioned for use as a grain store but, after the war the assembly rooms were re-opened again and operated as a cinema showing silent films on a regular basis. Meanwhile, the market hall on the ground floor was converted into a series of small shops. In 1949, the building hosted some of the events associated with the National Eisteddfod of Wales and, at that time, it was renamed Neuadd Idris, recalling the mountain, Cadair Idris. Then, in 1966, Lady Megan Lloyd George, visited the building to present a petition signed by 240,000 people to Goronwy Roberts calling for a Parliament for Wales.

The assembly rooms were subsequently used for dances, concerts, and theatrical performances. A season of performances of Shakespeare's tragedy, Hamlet, took place between January and April 1955, and the Dolgellau Amateur Dramatic Society, which was formed in 1978, performed in the building for many years. In October 1991, the assembly rooms were the venue for a meeting of the Snowdonia Society at which the conservationist, Esmé Kirby, who had led the society for 24 years, eventually stood down as its chair. The last dance function, aptly titled the Last Waltz, was held in August 2000.

Following the completion of an extensive programme of refurbishment works costing £1.2 million, the building re-opened as the home to the National Centre for Folk Music, known as Tŷ Siamas, in June 2007.
