= Clogau Gold Mine =

Gold mine in North Wales

Coordinates: 52.7618°N 3.9647°W

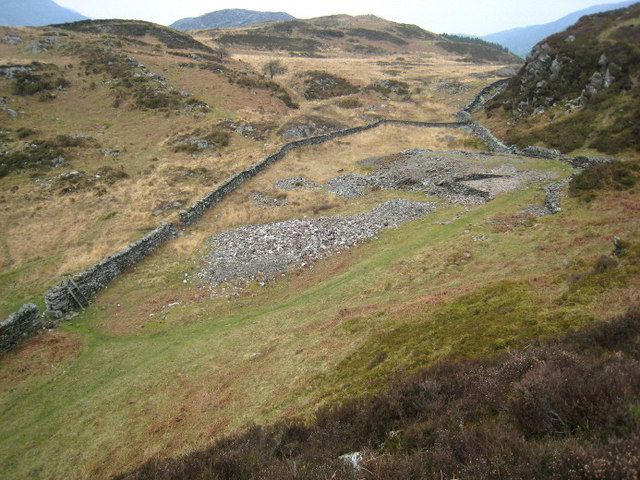
Photo of Clogau Gold Mine in 2007

The Clogau (pronounced "clog-eye") Gold Mine (also known as Clogau St David's) is a gold mine near Bontddu in North Wales.

== History ==
The Clogau mine was opened to exploit the copper and lead veins in the area north of Bontddu. In 1854, gold was discovered at the mine in a vein of quartz. The main gold-bearing vein was named the "St. David's lode", and in 1860 arrangements were made with the Crown Estate to work the gold commercially. Operations started on 28 August 1860.

Clogau produced significant amounts of gold in the 1890s. In 1899, it produced £60,000 worth of gold (equivalent to £8,531,168 in 2023).

In 1919, exploration of the mine found new gold veins. A new crushing plant was installed and the mine was re-opened.

In 1989 the Clogau Gold Mine was re-opened by William Roberts, founder of Clogau Gold of Wales Ltd. Gold extraction re-commenced between 1992 and 1998, with small-scale mining providing the gold for Clogau Gold jewellery. Mining eventually ceased in 1998 due to the high cost of mining and diminishing quantities of gold being found.

== Future mining ==
A 2012 report conducted by Snowdon Mining Consultants on behalf of the previous majority owners of the mine, Gold Mining Wales Ltd (GMW), suggested that as much as 500,000 ounces of gold could be lying untouched in the area surrounding the mine, giving hope that gold may again be extracted from the Clogau Gold Mine. Alba Mineral Resources are now the majority owner of the mine and are currently drilling to assess the commercial viability of reopening parts of the mine. Previous samples taken from a 200 metre long area returned gold grades of 30.2 to 263 grams per tonne, suggesting that previously unrealised supplies of gold could potentially exist.

== See also ==
- Gwynfynydd Gold Mines
- Dolaucothi Gold Mines
- Welsh gold
