= Bontddu =

Coordinates: 52.751°N 3.967°W

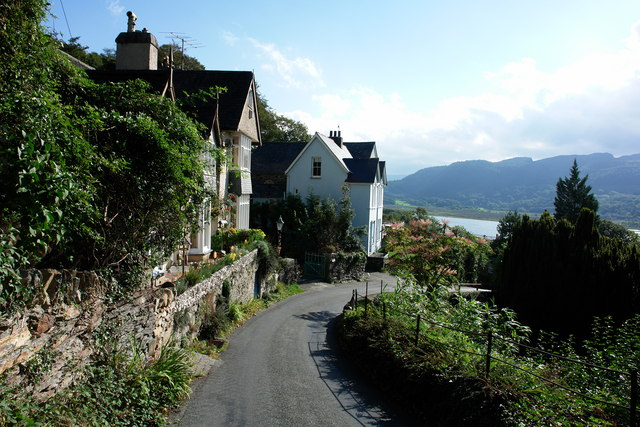
- Bontddu

- Location within Gwynedd
- OS grid reference: SH673189
- Community: Llanelltyd
- Principal area: Gwynedd
- Country: Wales
- Sovereign state: United Kingdom
- Post town: DOLGELLAU
- Postcode district: LL40
- Dialling code: 01341
- Police: North Wales
- Fire: North Wales
- Ambulance: Welsh
- UK Parliament: Dwyfor Meirionnydd
- Senedd Cymru – Welsh Parliament: Gwynedd Maldwyn

Bontddu (Welsh for 'black bridge') is a small settlement just east of Barmouth, near the town of Dolgellau in Gwynedd, Wales. It is in the community of Llanelltyd.

== Description ==
Bontddu consists of a small collection of dwellings, a former chapel and a pub called The Halfway House which closed many years ago and is now boarded up. The settlement is notable as it is the location of Clogau St David's gold mine that traditionally supplies gold for royal wedding rings.

== Events ==
In 1997 the tanks at Bontddu petrol station leaked which caused a fireball and evacuation.

== Tourism ==
Local tourism information describes a popular walk in the area of Bontddu:

'follows the 100 metre contour line along the estuary to the East of Borthwnog. Directly behind us walk up into the RSPB (Garth Gell) reserve and on up toward Cwm Mynach and beyond to the wilds of the Harlech Dome. Bear left from the latter path and double back behind the village of Bontddu and join the old drovers track across to Pont Scethin which allegedly was the scene of many highway robberies in the 17th century'.
