= Rhoose Cardiff International Airport railway station =

Railway station in the Vale of Glamorgan, Wales

Rhoose Cardiff International Airport Welsh: Maes Awyr Rhyngwladol Caerdydd Y Rhws
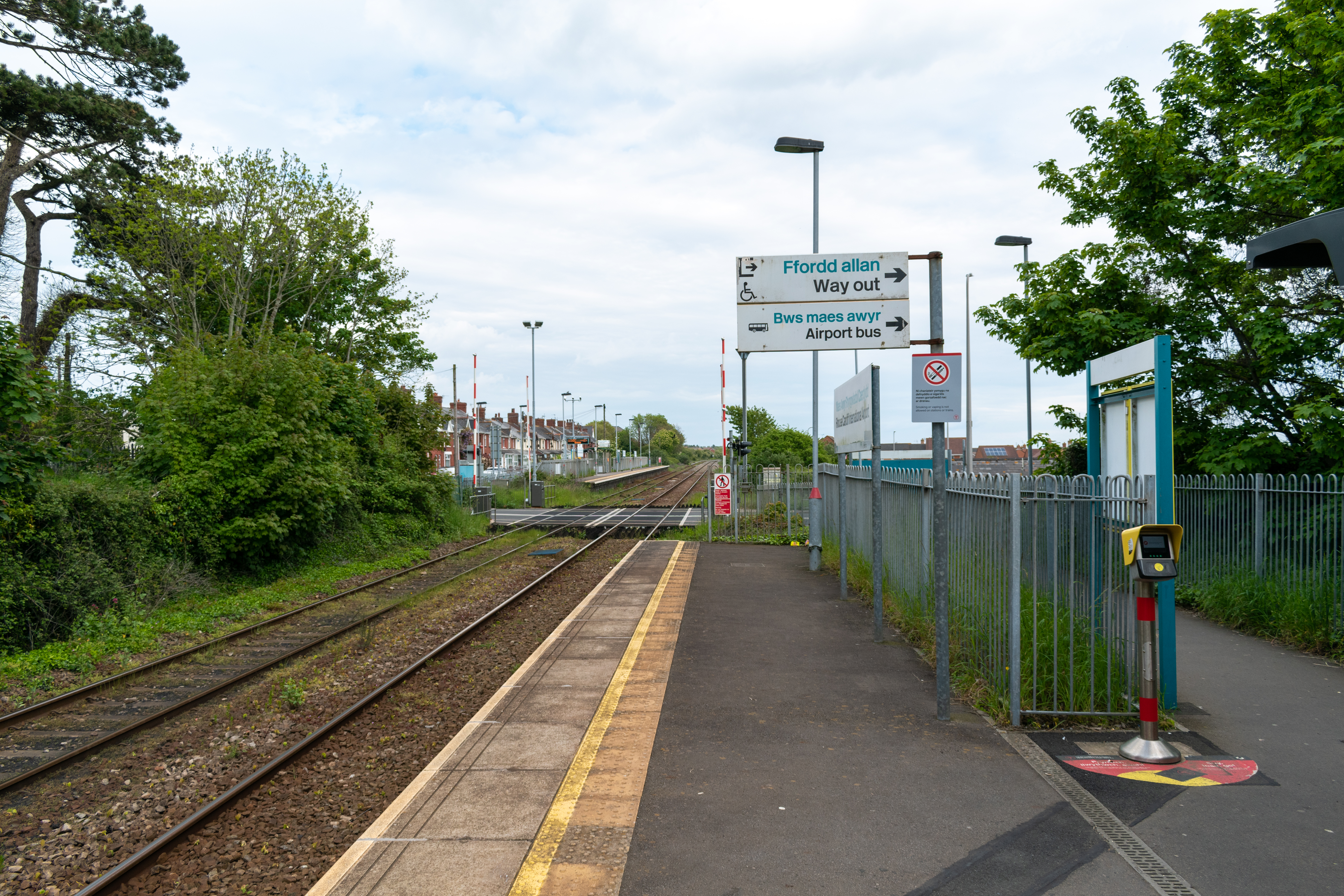
- View eastwards (towards Cardiff) from platform 2; platform 1 can be seen on the other side of the level crossing

General information
- Location: Rhoose, Vale of Glamorgan, Wales
- Coordinates: 51°23′14″N 3°20′56″W
- Grid reference: ST062662
- Manager: Transport for Wales
- Platforms: 2

Other information
- Station code: RIA

Key dates
- 1 December 1897: Opened
- 15 June 1964: Closed
- 12 June 2005: Reopened

Passengers
- 2020/21: ▼25,674
- 2021/22: ▲98,234
- 2022/23: ▲0.153 million
- 2023/24: ▲0.168 million
- 2024/25: ▲0.172 million
Location
Notes
- Passenger statistics from the Office of Rail and Road

Rhoose Cardiff International Airport railway station serves Cardiff Airport and the village of Rhoose, in the Vale of Glamorgan, South East Wales. The station lies on the Vale of Glamorgan Line, 11 1/2 miles (18.5 km) west of Cardiff Central. A dedicated shuttle bus connects the station with the airport terminal building.

== History ==
The original station was known as Rhoose, before it was closed in 1964.

Passenger services were restored to the Vale of Glamorgan after 41 years. A new station was built at Rhoose and it received a new name, to represent its proximity to the airport; it was opened on 12 June 2005.

== Longest station name ==
Rhoose Cardiff International Airport station now holds the distinction of having the longest name for a railway station, as recognised by National Rail; this is in both English (Note: This is 33 letters, excluding spaces.) and Welsh. (Note: Maes Awyr Rhyngwladol Caerdydd Y Rhws; this is 28 letters, as dd, ng and rh are single letters in Welsh.)

Llanfairpwllgwyngyllgogerychwyrndrobwllllantysiliogogogoch station arguably has a longer name, but the village in question was deliberately given a contrived name for that very reason; the station is known officially as either Llanfairpwll or Llanfairpwllgwyngyll – the longer name is not shown on National Rail information documents.

Historically, there was a second longer station name, as before 2007; Golf Halt on the privately-owned Fairbourne Railway, a heritage railway tourist attraction, was known as Gorsafawddachaidraigddanheddogleddollônpenrhynareurdraethceredigion, a grammatically incorrect pseudo-Welsh name that was coined for the express purpose of rivalling Llanfairpwllgwyngyll.

== Services ==
From Monday to Saturday, there is an hourly service westbound to Bridgend and eastbound to Cardiff Central, Cardiff Queen Street and Rhymney. On Sundays, there is a two-hourly service in each direction, with eastbound trains terminating at Cardiff Central.

| Preceding station | National Rail | Following station |
|---|---|---|
| Barry | Transport for Wales; Vale Line | Llantwit Major |
| | Historical railways | |
| Barry; Line and station open | Barry Railway; Vale of Glamorgan Railway | Aberthaw; Line open; station closed |
