= Salem The Blue Chapel =

Historic chapel in Snowdonia, Wales, UK

Coordinates: 52°40′00″N 4°05′04″W

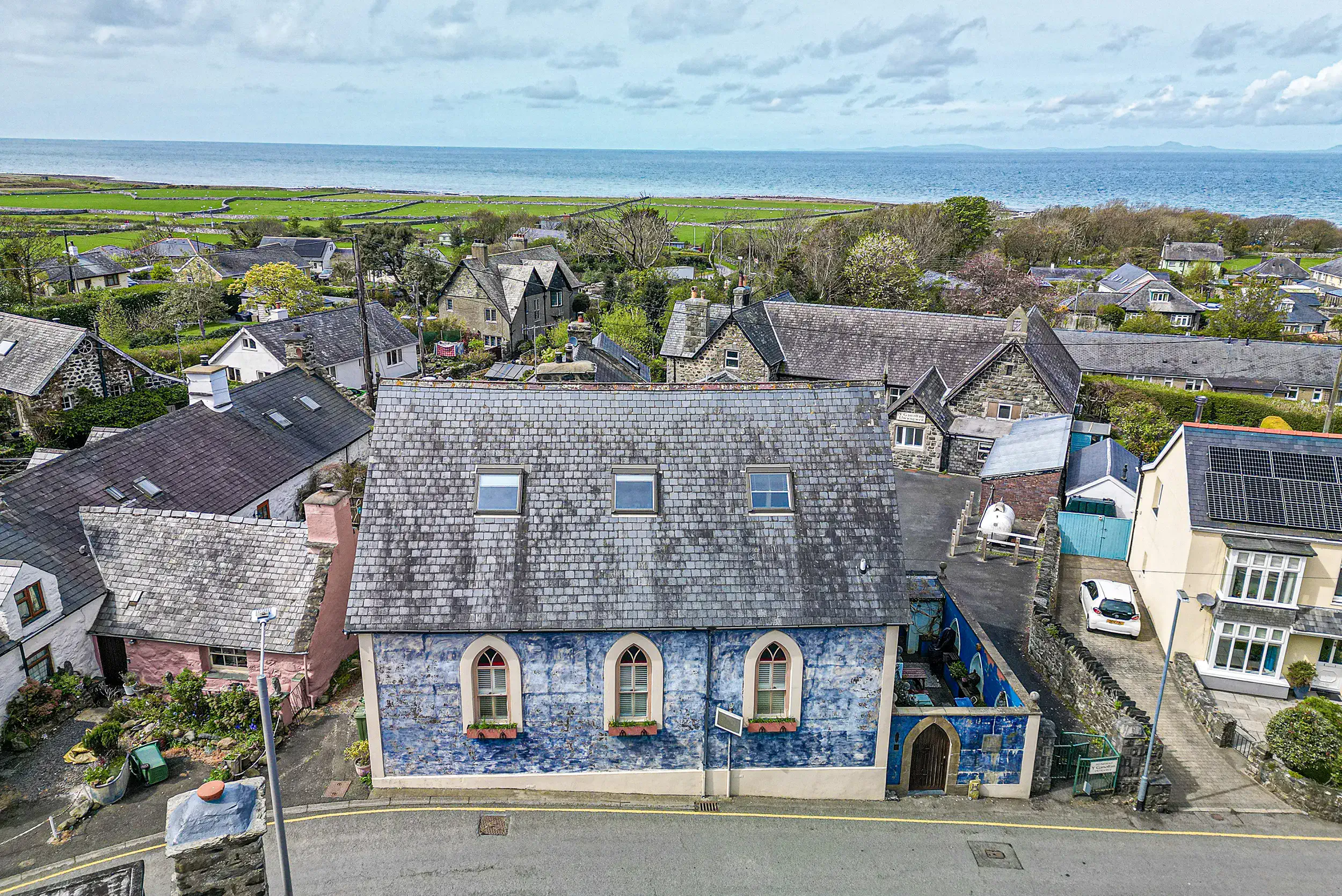
- Aerial photo of Salem The Blue Chapel

General information
- Location: Llwyngwril, Merionethshire, Gwynedd, Wales

Salem The Blue Chapel (Welsh: Salem Y Capel Glas), also known as Salem Wesleyan Methodist Chapel, is a historical three-bedroom holiday retreat resting in the quaint coastal village of Llwyngwril in the county of Merionethshire, Gwynedd, Wales.

== History ==
Constructed in 1812 and rebuilt in 1871, Salem The Blue Chapel was originally named Salem Chapel (Welsh: Capel Salem). It was commissioned by the Church of England to be used as the first school in the town of Llwyngwril. Despite being a church school, students were required to pay one penny per week for their education from 1870 until 1873 when students were transferred to the newly opened Llwyngwril Board School.

From 1973 onwards, Salem Chapel became known as the Church Room. It was utilized for various church activities such as Sunday School, fundraising events, and even weddings. The room was renovated and expanded during this time and remained active as a venue until its sale in the late 1990s.

The chapel had been at the heart of the village's religious and cultural life for generations. It had served as a place of worship, a meeting place for community members, and a center for various events and celebrations. The chapel's architecture and historical significance also make it a popular tourist attraction, drawing visitors from all over the world.

Salem The Blue Chapel
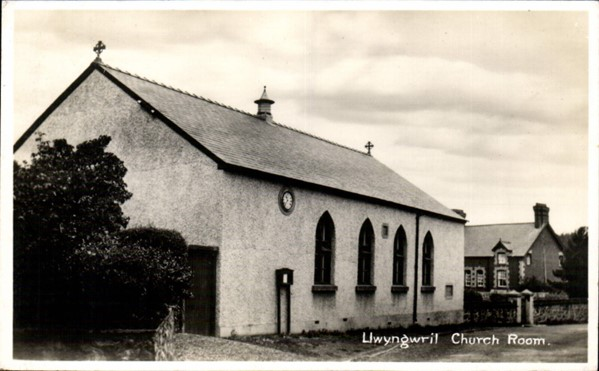
- Historic photo of Salem The Blue Chapel

General information
- Location: Llwyngwril, Merionethshire, Gwynedd, Wales

In the 1990s, Salem Chapel was purchased by the late antique dealer, Roger Haynes, originally from Leek in Staffordshire. Initially, Haynes opened the Salem Chapel as an antique shop, but he had grander plans for the space. His goal was to transform the chapel - which was just four walls and a roof - into a gothic revival masterpiece for his family to call home.

Haynes spent 3 years with the help of interior designer Michael Hale and his wife, researching and designing the renovation. Hale was an expert in recreating period features and restoring damaged interiors, and had a keen eye for detail and a deep understanding of the materials and techniques used in different historical periods.

Renovating a plain four-walled building into a gothic masterpiece was no small task. The team carefully selected each element to balance historical charm and modern comfort. With the help of skilled craftsmen and artisans, Haynes transformed the chapel into a gothic style residence while utilizing faux painting and finishing to lower the cost.

Along with extensive interior renovations, also came a new name. Salem Chapel was now called Salem The Blue Chapel (Welsh: Salem Y Capel Glas), or The Blue Chapel for short. The chapel has a blue exterior, while its renovated interior includes historical architectural features, including Intricate wood paneling, stone staircases, artisan wood carvings, ornate ceilings, stained glass windows, marble fireplaces, and an organ gallery crowned by a grand pipe organ.

== Interior renovations ==
The architectural features of the building are fashioned from fibrous plaster, including the stone staircase, arch windows, carvings, and finely detailed ceilings. To achieve this look, interior designer Michael Hale used original 1920s molds and created several of his own.

The wood paneling, fireplace, and four-poster bed canopy are crafted from hardwood and designed with joinery and paint effects in imitation of historical styles. The painting team, which consisted of Michael's artist wife and other skilled artists, added stone effects to the walls, silver gilt and stippled colors to the ceilings, and marble effects to the bathrooms. The living room features medieval paintings, while the entrance hallway has heavenly scenes all created by the team to look like originals.

The grand pipe organ is a prominent fixture, situated beneath a stained-glass window above the entrance. The organ is made from plywood instead of the traditional spruce wood lumber, which is preferred as it vibrates more easily, resulting in an ideal sound. A type of plywood used for the soundboards of pianos was used in the design, which allowed for a lower cost.

The chapel's ceilings, walls, and floors are adorned with intricate designs, many of which were produced using the trompe l'oeil technique, a 3D optical illusion painting method. The technique provides depth to a two-dimensional surface, deceiving the viewer into seeing levels of depth where there are none.

== In art ==
=== Illustrations ===
Sanctaidd, Y Fath Yw Cariad, Y Fath Yw Bywyd is a breathtaking oil painting on canvas, which was commissioned in June 2023 and completed on 26 August 2023. The concept for this custom, hand-painted original artwork was developed by Eyola and brought to life by West Alkebulan/African independent artist Godwin Ekhanemeh. The painting was inspired by the sounds of the Cymraeg/Welsh-Senegalese harp-kora musical duo Catrin Finch and Seckou Keita.

=== Fashion ===
Cloth sculptor and storyteller Eyola created a fashion sculpture in 2023 inspired by Salem The Blue Chapel, which was sketched by Ukrainian illustrator Tatyana Smirnova on 19 April 2023. The silhouette, titled "Silwét Barcud Coch a Thelyn" ("Silhouette Red Kite and Harp"), features symbols of Welsh identity and is a unique example of cloth-based art.

The harp (lapel and the bottom front of the coat), the leek (sleeve cuffs), the river gorges and mountains (shoulders), and the collar in the shape of a beak, which is an ode to the well-loved majestic copper-breasted raptor, Y Barcud Coch, or the red kite, are all central to the sculptural process.

=== Music and poetry ===
Writer Gwion Owen has published an anthology of poems dedicated to Salem The Blue Chapel, commissioned by Salem The Blue Chapel's Head Curator, Eyola, which focuses on a special part of Welsh culture.

== See also ==
- Snowdonia National Park
- Gwynedd
- Llwyngwril
- Llwyngwril Yarn Bombing
