= LLW =

As an abbreviation, LLW may refer to:

== Companies ==
- Lavacot Locomotive Works
- Lima Locomotive Works, a defunct American manufacturer of railroad locomotives

== Locations ==
- Lilongwe International Airport (IATA airport code)
- Llwyngwril railway station, Gwynedd, Wales (National Rail station code)

== Terms ==
- Low-level waste, nuclear waste
