= Barmouth Bay =

Bay on the west coast of Wales

Coordinates: 52°41′50″N 4°04′45″W

Barmouth Bay from above Barmouth, looking south

Barmouth Bay (Welsh: Bae Bermo) is a bay in Gwynedd on the west coast of Wales, forming a part of the much larger Cardigan Bay. The coast fronting onto the bay is within the Snowdonia National Park at its northern and southern extremities, but the coastal town of Barmouth and village of Fairbourne at the back of the bay are excluded from the designated area.

Inland of the bay is the sandy Mawddach estuary, through which the tidal channel of the river winds before emptying into the bay beyond Fairbourne Spit, a shingle promontory stretching north from Fairbourne. A sandbank known as 'The Bar' guards the entrance to this channel from Cardigan Bay.

Barmouth Bay and Barmouth from above Fairbourne, with Fairbourne Spit stretching from left to right

The Cambrian Coast Line runs along the narrow coastal strip at the back of the bay, crossing the Mawddach via Barmouth Bridge, which also carries the Wales Coast Path.
