= George Alfred Walker (sanitary reformer) =

English sanitary reformer

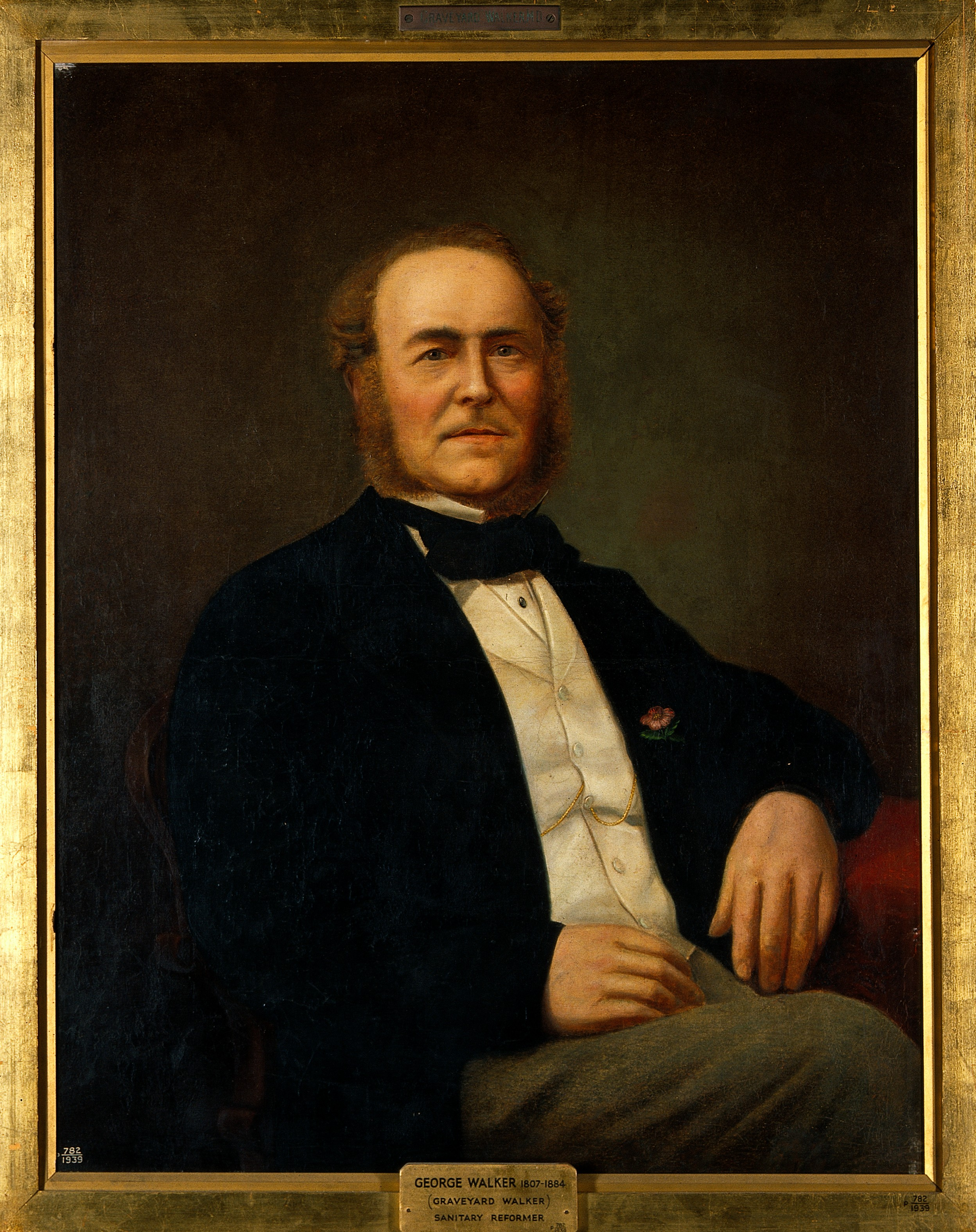
- Born: 1807
- Died: 1884
- Occupation: Surgeon

George Alfred Walker (Graveyard Walker) (27 October 1807 – 6 July 1884) was a sanitary reformer from England who campaigned for reforming burial practices to prevent the spread of infection.

== Background ==
Walker was born in Nottingham, the second son of William Walker, a plumber, and his wife Elizabeth Williamson, of Barton under Needwood, Staffordshire. He received his earliest education from Henry Wild, a Quaker from Nottingham. He went to London and attended Aldersgate School. He became a licensee of the Worshipful Society of Apothecaries in 1829, and a member of the Royal College of Surgeons in 1831. He went on to study at St Bartholomew's Hospital in 1835, and the following year at Hôtel Dieu in Paris.

== Career ==
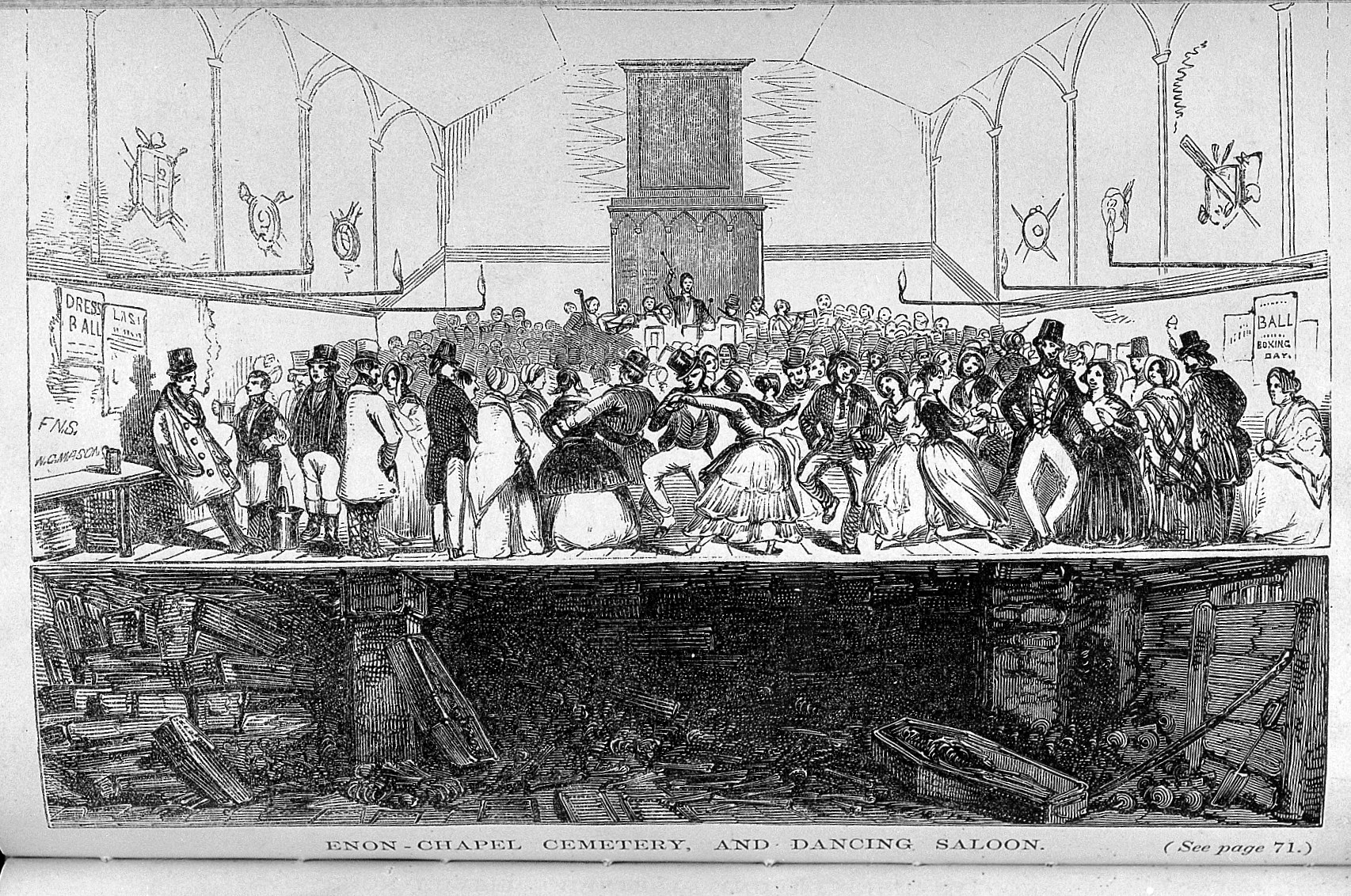
Illustration of the burials under the Enon Chapel from his Lectures series. Credit: Wellcome Library

In 1837 Walker returned to London establishing a medical practice in 101 Drury Lane. Within a stone's throw of his surgery were seven of the most crowded and infectious cemeteries in London. These included Ground Green in Portugal Street and Enon Chapel St Clement's Lane, where between 10,000 and 12,000 people were buried under the floors in a cellar measuring only 59 x 29 feet. Walker was convinced that the smell derived from these overcrowded cemeteries was toxic and could adversely affect the health of those living nearby.

He published several books and booklets that highlighted the horrific state of urban cemeteries and sought to experience a link between diseases and burial practices. He wanted to see a ban on burials between walls and establish new cemeteries outside the towns.

In 1845 he founded the Metropolitan Society for the Abolition of Burials in Towns to advance his case. Walker's campaign was significantly boosted by a cholera epidemic in 1848. Afterwards, most people were convinced that disease was linked to hygiene and public sanitation.

Walker's campaign led to measures banning any further burials in London city center cemeteries and the appointment of burial inspectors.

== Retirement and death ==
Walker retired to Arthog, Dolgellau in 1855. He spent his last years writing an autobiography called Grave reminiscences: some experiences of a sanitary reformer, but the work was not completed. He died at his home on 6 July 1884, after suffering a sudden paralysing attack a week earlier. and his remains were buried in Quaker Cemetery in Llwyngwril.

== Publications ==
- Gatherings from Graveyards (1839)
- The grave yards of London (1841)
- Interment and Disinterment (1843)
- Burial Ground Incendiarism (1846)
- Actual Conditions of Metropolitan Graveyards , 3 collections of lectures (1847)
- The Warm Vapour Cure (1847)
- Grave reminiscences: some experiences of a sanitary reformer
