= Barmouth Ferry =

Passenger service ferry in Gwynedd county, north Wales

The Barmouth Ferry provides a passenger service across the River Mawddach in Gwynedd county, north Wales. There are currently two ferry operators on the harbour. The service usually operates from April to October.

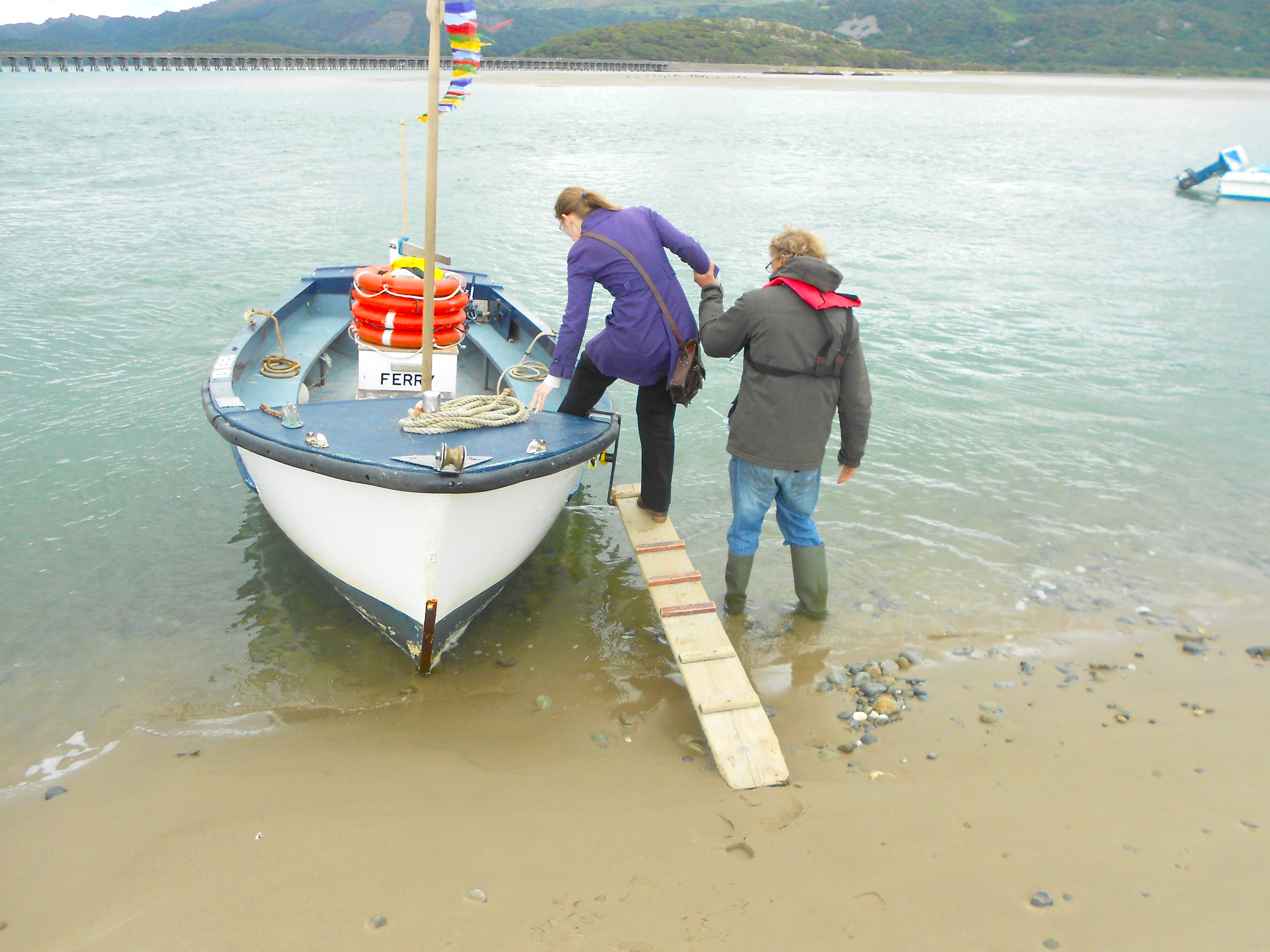
"Seren Wen", one of the two Barmouth Ferry passenger boats.

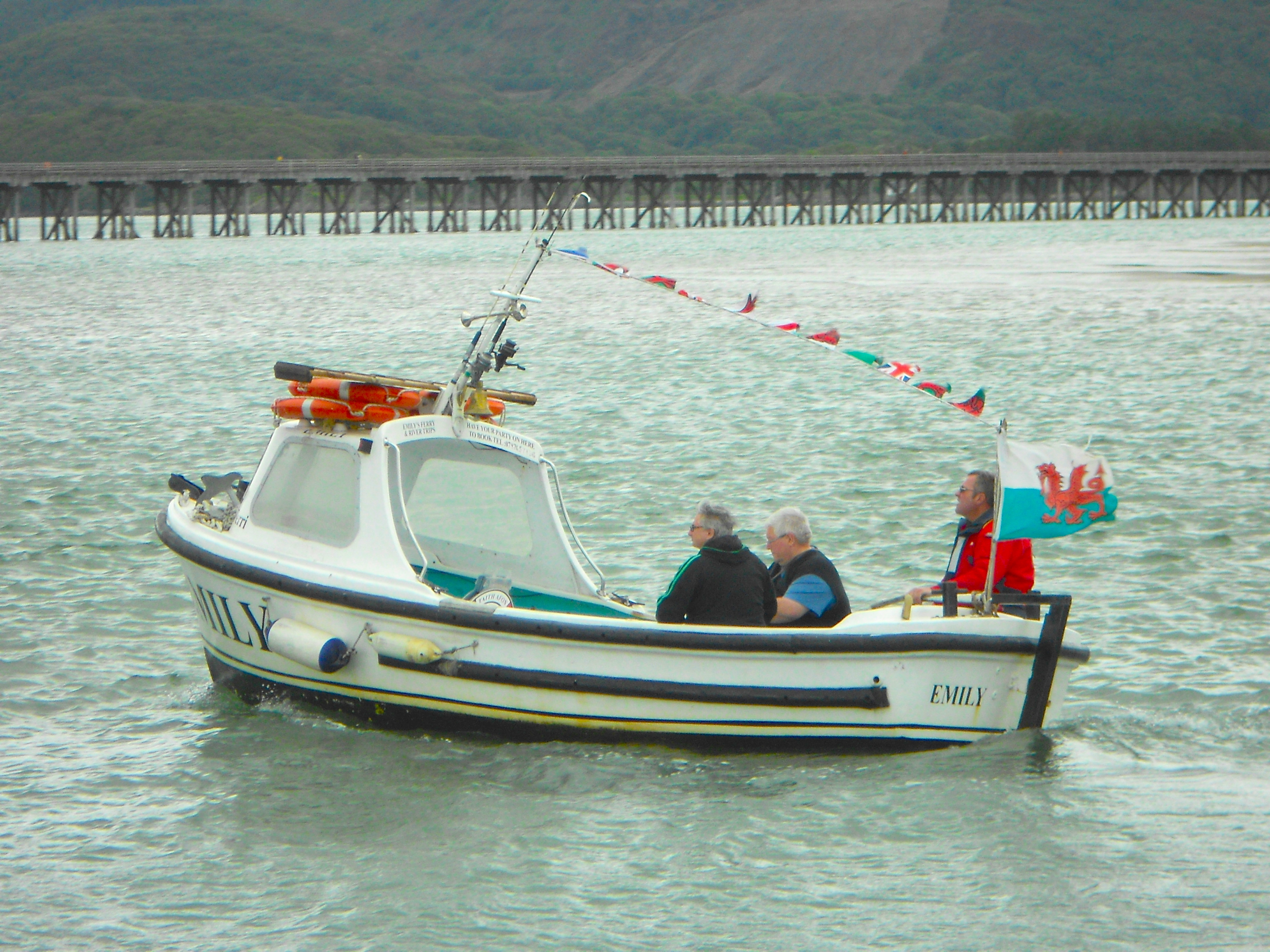
"Emily", one of the two Barmouth Ferry passenger boats. Barmouth Bridge is in the background.

== Route ==
The ferry connects the town of Barmouth with Penrhyn Point on the opposite bank of the estuary, and about two miles north of Fairbourne. There is a direct interchange with Barmouth Ferry railway station, the northern terminus of the Fairbourne Railway. The crossing takes approximately five minutes. Barmouth Bridge, which carries a railway and a foot/cycle path, also crosses the estuary.

== History ==
The Barmouth Ferry is an ancient service. It was originally operated by local monks, until the dissolution of the monasteries under King Henry VIII, when the service was taken over by local fishermen. In 1797 the Barmouth Harbour Trust was founded by act of parliament, as Barmouth had become the primary shipbuilding port in Wales, and the trust was given responsibility for the ferry service. It franchised the operation of the ferry to various local operators.

== Current operation ==
The Barmouth Ferry continues to operate under franchise. Today services operate from around Easter until the end of October. In general, ferries operate on all the days on which the Fairbourne Railway is operational, and ferries are timed, where possible, to connect with trains. The ferry boats are small open vessels, and are not suitable for operating in heavy seas or poor weather conditions.
