= Llanfairpwll railway station =

Railway station in Anglesey, Wales

Llanfairpwll
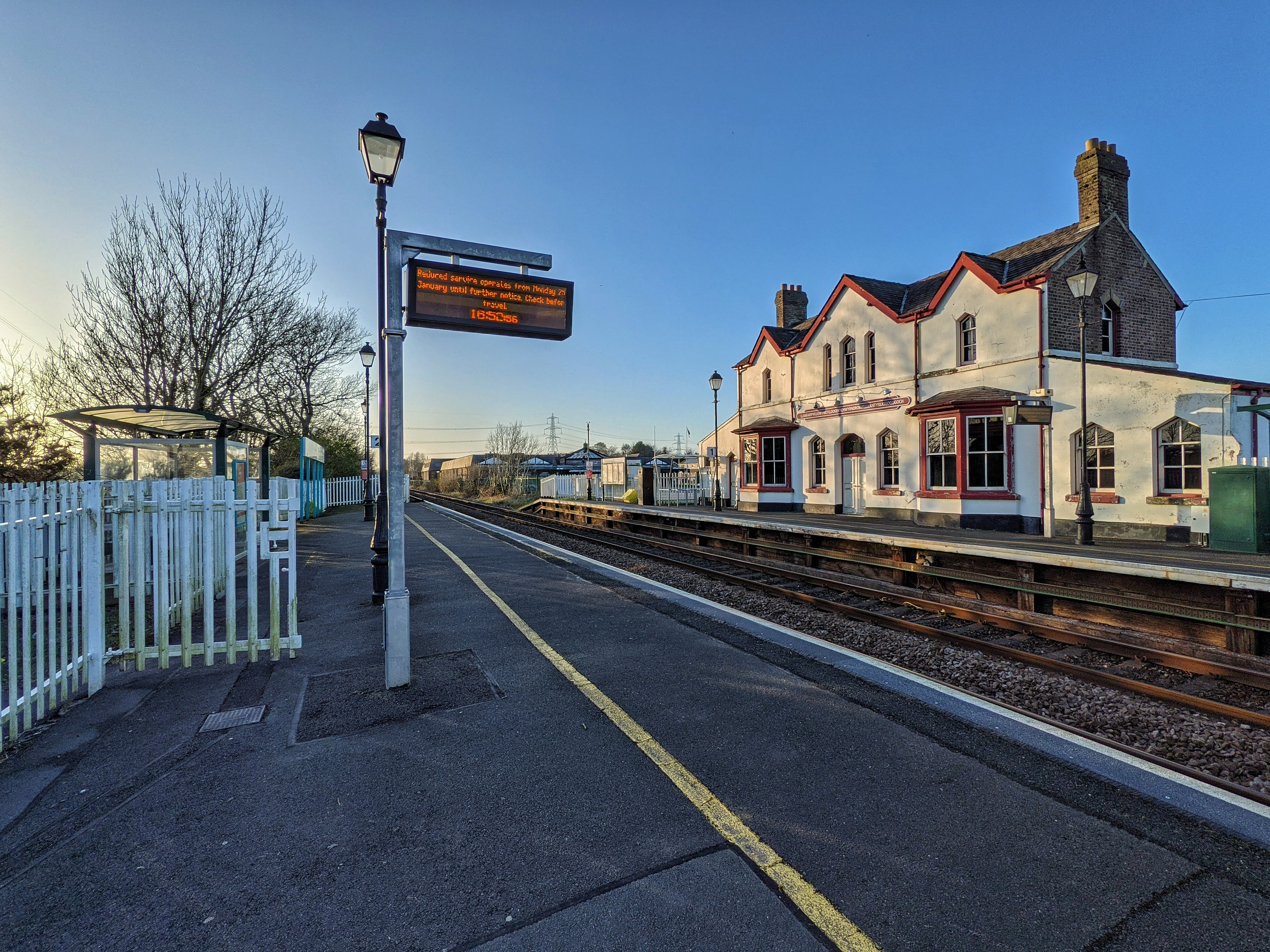
- Llanfairpwll station building and platforms 1 and 2 seen near platform 2 exit gate.

General information
- Other names: Llanfairpwllgwyngyllgogerychwyrndrobwllllantysiliogogogoch
- Location: Llanfairpwllgwyngyll, Anglesey; Wales
- Coordinates: 53.221°N 4.209°W
- Grid reference: SH525715
- Owner: Network Rail
- Manager: Transport for Wales Rail
- Platforms: 2

Other information
- Station code: LPG
- Classification: DfT category F2

Key dates
- 1848: Opened
- 1966: Closed
- 1970: Temporarily reopened
- 1972: Closed
- 1973: Reopened
- 6 July 2020: Temporarily closed
- 21 August 2021: Reopened

Passengers
- 2021/22: ▲7,158
- 2022/23: ▲23,376
- 2023/24: ▲30,186
- 2024/25: ▲38,650
- 2025/26: ▲56,348
Location
Notes
- Passenger statistics from the Office of Rail and Road

Llanfairpwll railway station, also signposted as Llanfairpwllgwyngyllgogerychwyrndrobwllllantysiliogogogoch, is a station on the North Wales Coast Line from Crewe to Holyhead, serving the village of Llanfairpwllgwyngyll, Anglesey, Wales.

== History ==
Opened in 1848 it was initially the terminus of the line from Holyhead before the opening of the Britannia Bridge to the mainland in 1850. It suffered a catastrophic fire on 13 November 1865 and had to be completely re-constructed. It was closed in 1966 but reopened in 1970 due to the fire on the Britannia Bridge again as the terminus for trains from Holyhead, with a single wooden platform. It was again closed in 1972 and subsequently reopened again 1973 with both wooden platforms (the only one on the island), which was refurbished in 2017 and the signal box remain from the original configuration, but converted into a gate keeper's box, meaning no junctions or signals are controlled from there, except for gate locking. However, a turntable, sidings and goods yard have disappeared, the latter two under a car park.

Between 8 July 2020 and 21 August 2021 trains did not call at the station, with the platforms at the station being too short to maintain social distancing between passengers and the guard.

=== Name ===
The station is known for its longer name, Llanfairpwllgwyngyllgogerychwyrndrobwllllantysiliogogogoch, but this is a Victorian contrivance for the benefit of tourists with no basis in historical usage. It comprises the full name of the village, plus local topographical details, plus the name of a neighbouring church etc. The actual longest railway station name in Wales (and also the UK) is Rhoose Cardiff International Airport railway station.

== Facilities ==
The station is unstaffed and has no ticket provision - these must be bought on the train or prior to travel. Waiting shelters are provided on each platform and train running details offered via timetable posters and digital information screens (as can be seen from the accompanying station photograph). The station is not listed as accessible for mobility-impaired and wheelchair users on the National Rail Enquiries website.

During April 2017, the upgrade of the footbridge was completed as part of Network Rail's Railway Upgrade Plan. The footbridge, which is over 100 years old, was temporarily removed earlier in the year, to undergo a £395,000 upgrade, including specialist refurbishment and repairs at the Centregreat Rail workshop in Cardiff.

== Services ==
There is a basic two-hourly weekday service in each direction from the station in the winter 2022 timetable, with several additional morning and evening departures. Most eastbound trains run to Wrexham General, Shrewsbury and Birmingham International, although some run to either Crewe, Manchester Airport or Cardiff.

The Sunday service is irregular but serves a variety of eastbound destinations, including Crewe, Cardiff, Manchester Airport and Birmingham International.

The station has very short platforms, only 40 yards (37 m) long. As a result, only one door on Transport for Wales intercity services is unlocked by the conductor/guard for passengers (Except for the BR classes 150/2 and 153 which occasionally visit Holyhead.)

Preceding station	National Rail	Following station
Bangor	Transport for Wales Rail North Wales Coast Line	Bodorgan
	Disused railways	
Menai Bridge; Line open, station closed	London and North Western Railway; Anglesey Central Railway	Gaerwen; Line open, station closed

== See also ==
- Rhoose Cardiff International Airport railway station – the station with the longest officially used name in Great Britain.
- Gorsafawddacha'idraigodanheddogleddollônpenrhynareurdraethceredigion – a station name contrived to be longer than Llanfairpwll
- Longest place names in the English language
