= Golf Halt railway station =

Railway station in Wales

Coordinates: 52°42′05″N 4°03′27″W

Golf Halt
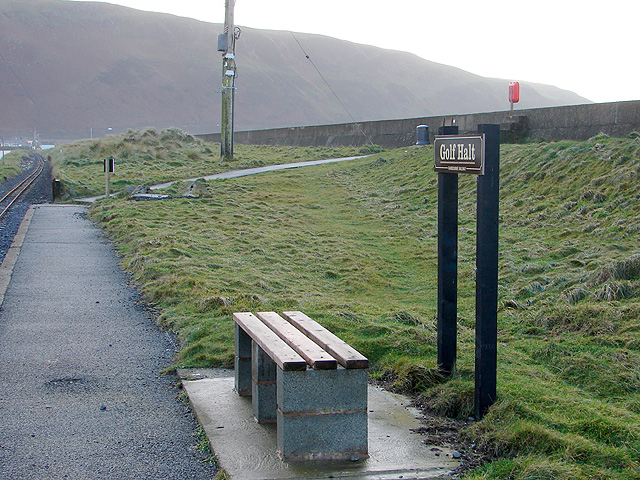

General information
- Location: Fairbourne, Gwynedd; Wales
- Grid reference: SH610135
- System: Station on heritage railway
- Operator: Fairbourne Railway
- Platforms: 1
Location

Golf Halt is a small railway halt on the Fairbourne Railway in Gwynedd, North Wales.

Until 2007, the station was known as Gorsafawddachaidraigddanheddogleddollônpenrhynareurdraethceredigion (Welsh pronunciation: [ˌɡɔrsaˌvauðaχaɪˌdraɪɡˌðanhɛðˌɔɡlɛðɔlˌloːnpɛnˌr̥ɪnarˌɛɨrˌdraːɨθkɛrɛˈdɪɡjɔn]).

== Overview ==
The name was contrived by the railway for publicity and to outdo Llanfairpwllgwyngyllgogerychwyrndrobwllllantysiliogogogoch. The Welsh name is translated as: "Mawddach Station and its Dragon beneath the northern peace of the Penrhyn Road on the golden beach of Cardigan Bay."

The "dragon" refers to some surviving World War II anti-tank blocks, known as dragon's teeth.

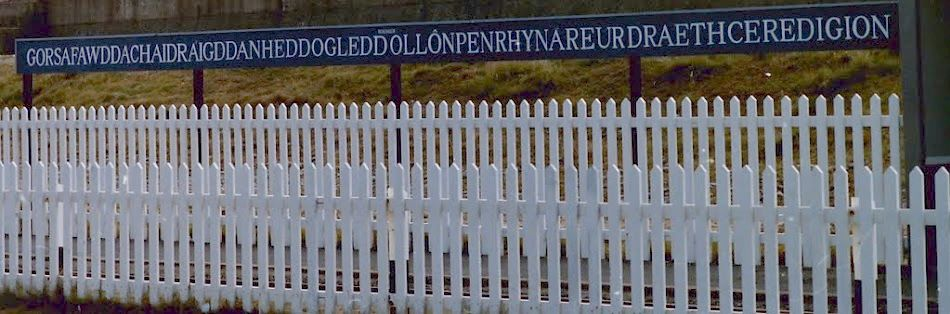
Sign displaying the longer name of the station.

Problems with the name are the need for the apostrophe and that the two words ...[g]ogleddol-lôn... need a hyphen between them to make sense. Ll is a letter in its own right in Welsh. It also includes the description ar eurdraeth Ceredigion for "on the golden beach of Cardigan Bay": however "Cardigan Bay" is Bae Ceredigion, and it is the neighbouring county (the station itself is in Gwynedd). Possibly because of this, the name has not received much if any official recognition and Llanfairpwllgwyngyllgogerychwyrndrobwllllantysiliogogogoch is still regarded as the longest by most authorities. The station reverted to its original name of Golf Halt in 2007 (although on the new sign underneath "Golf Halt" the long name is displayed in small letters).

== See also ==
- Longest word in English

Preceding station	Heritage railways	Following station
Beach Halt	Fairbourne Railway	Loop Halt
