= Fairbourne Spit =

Coordinates: 52.710°N 4.055°W

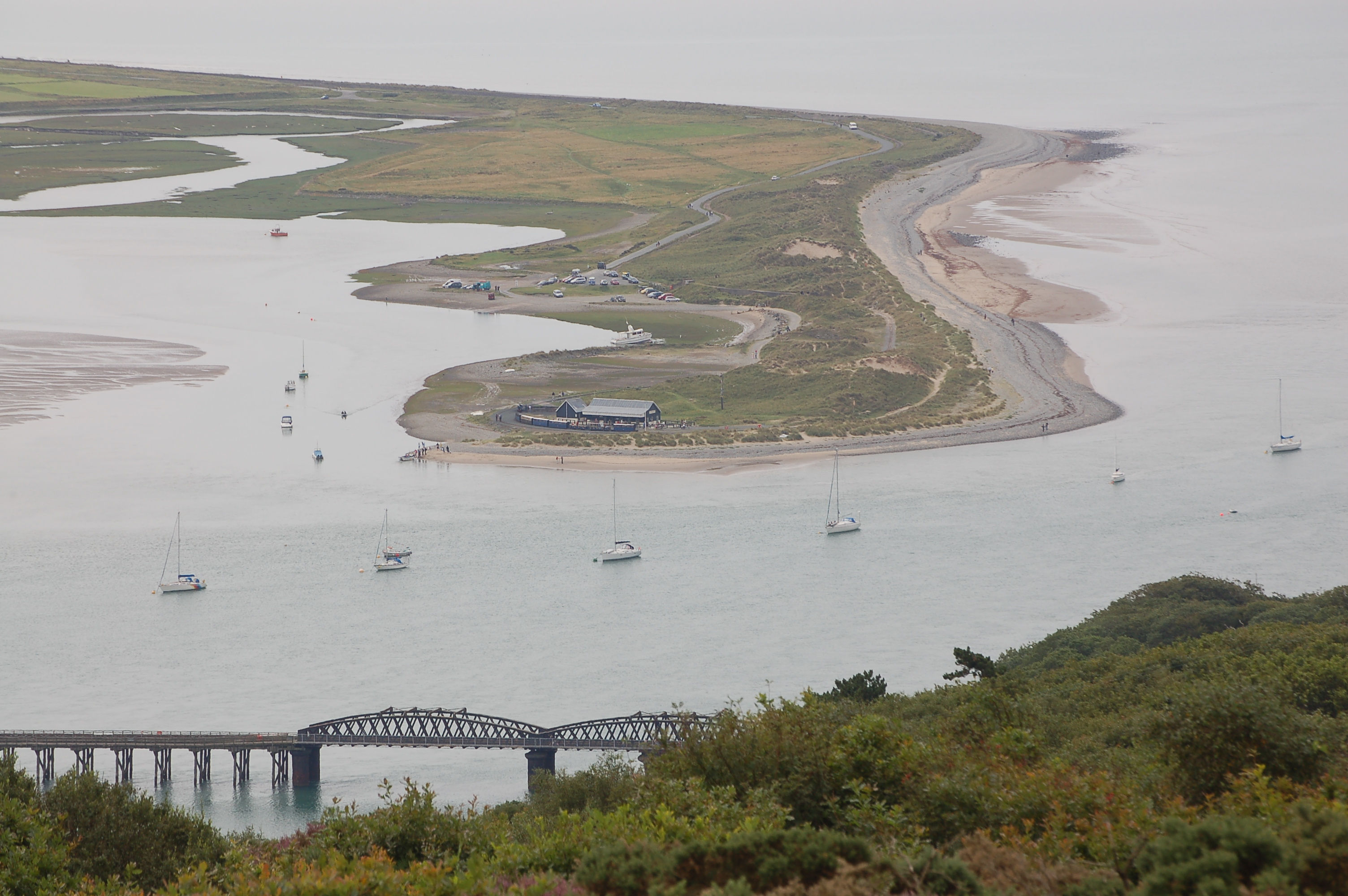
Fairbourne Spit viewed from Barmouth panorama point

Fairbourne Spit (also known as Penrhyn Point) is a long spit of sand and shingle at the mouth of the River Mawddach where it reaches Cardigan Bay, on the west coast of Wales. The gravel probably originates from Llwyngwril to the south and from seabed glacial deposits, while the sand and dunes at the north end of the spit are deposited from wind blown marine sand and from the estuary, which is a long-term sink for sandy sediment.

The narrow-gauge Fairbourne & Barmouth Railway (built in 1895) runs the length of the spit and, at the very end of the headland a ferry service makes the river crossing to Barmouth.

In the 2010s the spit was one of the locations around the coast of Wales that would no longer have its sea defences repaired, threatening Fairbourne and the surrounding area with regular flooding. In 2021 and 2022 local scientist Dr Graham Hall put forward papers that challenged the policy and suggested an alternative approach. A local campsite owner suggested creating an artificial reef.

== See also ==
- List of spits of the United Kingdom
