= Rail Link =

Rail Link may refer to:

- Montana Rail Link, a former Class II Railroad currently operated by BNSF as the MRL Subdivision
- Rail Link Inc., a subsidiary company of Genesee & Wyoming Inc.
- Rail Link (horse), a thoroughbred racehorse
- Rail Link Engineering, a subsidiary of London and Continental Railways
- Railink, a subsidiary of Kereta Api Indonesia
