= Llwyngwril =

Coordinates: 52.666°N 4.084°W

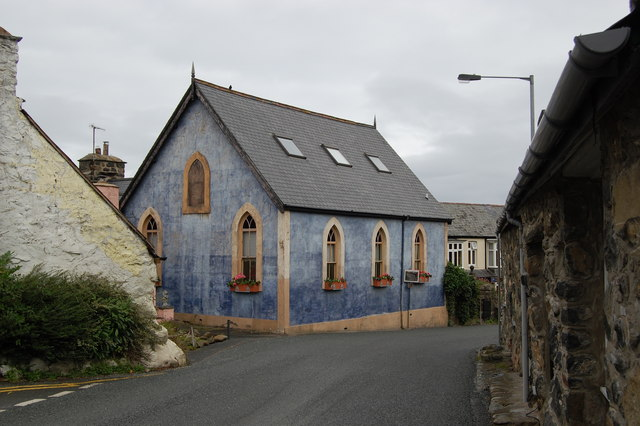
- Blue Chapel in Llwyngwril

- Location within Gwynedd
- Population: 526
- OS grid reference: SH590096
- Community: Llangelynin
- Principal area: Gwynedd
- Preserved county: Gwynedd
- Country: Wales
- Sovereign state: United Kingdom
- Post town: LLWYNGWRIL
- Postcode district: LL37
- Dialling code: 01341
- Police: North Wales
- Fire: North Wales
- Ambulance: Welsh
- UK Parliament: Dwyfor Meirionnydd
- Senedd Cymru – Welsh Parliament: Dwyfor Meirionnydd

Llwyngwril (Welsh pronunciation) is a coastal village, in Llangelynnin community, two miles north of the village of Llangelynnin and eleven miles south-west of Dolgellau. It is in the county of Merionethshire, Wales, although currently administered as part of the unitary authority of Gwynedd. The railway and road run along the coast and the village is sandwiched between the hills and the sea. The population according to the 2011 census was 526, with 56.7% of the population born in England, making it very Anglicised.

== The village ==
The village of Llwyngwril is situated to the west of the A493 coastal road between Fairbourne, some three miles to the north and the village of Llangelynnin, two miles to the south, at the mouth of the River Gwril. In this part of Barmouth Bay, the straight coastline has a northwesterly aspect, the railway runs close to the shore with the coastal road just inland behind which the hills rise steeply. The village consists of a number of houses, a shop, pub and had a primary school until a few years ago. The village is in the parish of Llangelynnin, which has two churches, both dedicated to Saint Celynnin. The original parish church is at Llangelynnin and the more modern one is in the centre of Llwyngwril. Saint Celynnin is a medieval saint who is traditionally thought to be a son of Helig ap Glannog. He and his brothers were all considered saints and the church at Llangelynnin in the Conwy Valley is also dedicated to him. Llwyngwril railway station is a request stop.

Another notable building in the village is the Salem Chapel. It is painted blue and is sometimes known as the Blue Chapel, and from the outside looks like a typical Welsh Non-conformist Chapel. However the interior is an elaborate mixture of Gothic-style features including simulated stone staircases, wood carvings, ornate ceilings, arched windows, marble fireplaces and an organ gallery complete with a plywood organ.

From the beach dolphins can often be seen in Cardigan Bay. There are many self-catering properties to rent and caravan and camping sites either in or very near to the village, including Sunbeach and Hendre Hall.

== See also ==
- Llwyngwril railway station
