= Llwyngwril railway station =

Railway station in Gwynedd, Wales

Llwyngwril
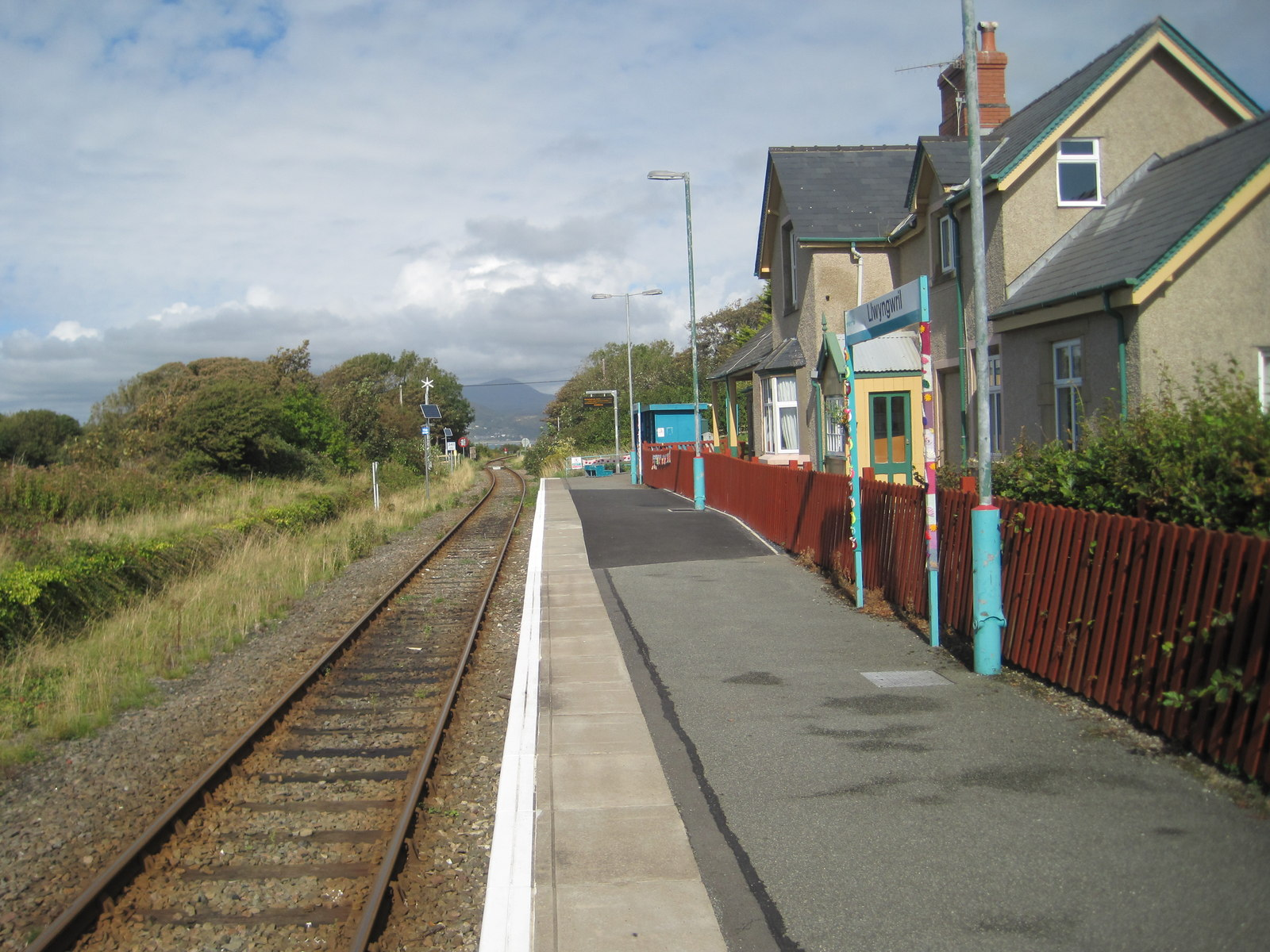

General information
- Location: Llwyngwril, Gwynedd; Wales
- Coordinates: 52.667°N 4.088°W
- Grid reference: SH589097
- Manager: Transport for Wales
- Platforms: 1

Other information
- Station code: LLW
- Classification: DfT category F2

Key dates
- 24 October 1863: opened

Passengers
- 2021/22: ▲19,468
- 2022/23: ▲29,744
- 2023/24: ▲30,790
- 2024/25: ▲38,780
- 2025/26: ▲39,260
Location
Notes
- Passenger statistics from the Office of Rail and Road

Llwyngwril railway station serves the village of Llwyngwril in Gwynedd, Wales. The station is an unstaffed halt on the Cambrian Coast Railway with passenger services to Barmouth, Harlech, Porthmadog, Pwllheli, Tywyn, Aberdovey, Machynlleth and Shrewsbury. Trains stop on request.

The former station building is now a private dwelling. Llwyngwril was once a two platformed station with a passing loop and a water crane. Between Llwyngwril station and Fairbourne station is Friog cliff, which has views out to sea.

In 2016, The Welsh Government funded the installation of reinforced glass fibre 'humps' on the platforms to improve access for wheelchair and pushchair users onto and off trains.

Preceding station	National Rail	Following station
Fairbourne	Transport for Wales; Cambrian Coast Line	Tonfanau
	Historical railways	
Fairbourne; Line and station open	Cambrian Railways; Aberystwith and Welsh Coast Railway	Llangelynin; Line open, station closed
