= Fairbourne Railway =

Welsh miniature railway

Fairbourne Railway Rheilffordd y Friog
- Official badge of the railway
- Locale: Wales
- Terminus: Fairbourne and Barmouth Ferry
- Coordinates: 52.69512°N 4.05085°W

Commercial operations
- Name: Fairbourne Miniature Railway
- Built by: Narrow Gauge Railways Ltd
- Original gauge: 1895-1916: 2 ft (610 mm); 1916-1940:

Preserved operations
- Owned by: North Wales Coast Light Railway
- Operated by: Fairbourne Railway Limited, supported by Fairbourne Railway Preservation Society
- Stations: 2 and 4 halts
- Length: 2 miles (3.2 km)
- Preserved gauge: 1947 - 1986: 15 in (381 mm) (restored as dual gauge in 2017 from Fairbourne station to Car Park crossing); 1986 – present: 12 1/4 in (311 mm)

Commercial history
- Opened: 1895
- 1916: converted to 15 in (381 mm)
- Closed: 1940

Preservation history
- 1925: Arrival of Bassett-Lowke locomotive Count Louis
- 1927: Brief period of dual gauge operation (18 in (457 mm) and 15 in (381 mm))
- 1935: First Internal Combustion locomotive Whippit Quick arrives.
- 1947: Purchased and re-opened by John Wilkins
- 1959: Fairbourne Station expanded
- 1976: Line extended to its present length
- 1984: Purchased by John Ellerton
- 1986: regauged to 12 1/4 in (311 mm)
- 1995: Purchased by Professor Tony Atkinson and Dr Roger Melton
- 2006: Fairbourne Railway Supporter's Association becomes Fairbourne Railway Preservation Society

The Fairbourne Railway (Welsh: Rheilffordd y Friog) is a 12 1/4 in (311 mm) gauge miniature railway running for 2 miles (3.2 km) from the village of Fairbourne on the Mid-Wales coast, alongside the beach to the end of a peninsula at Barmouth Ferry railway station, where there is a connection with the Barmouth Ferry across the Mawddach estuary to the seaside resort of Barmouth (Welsh: Abermaw).

== History ==
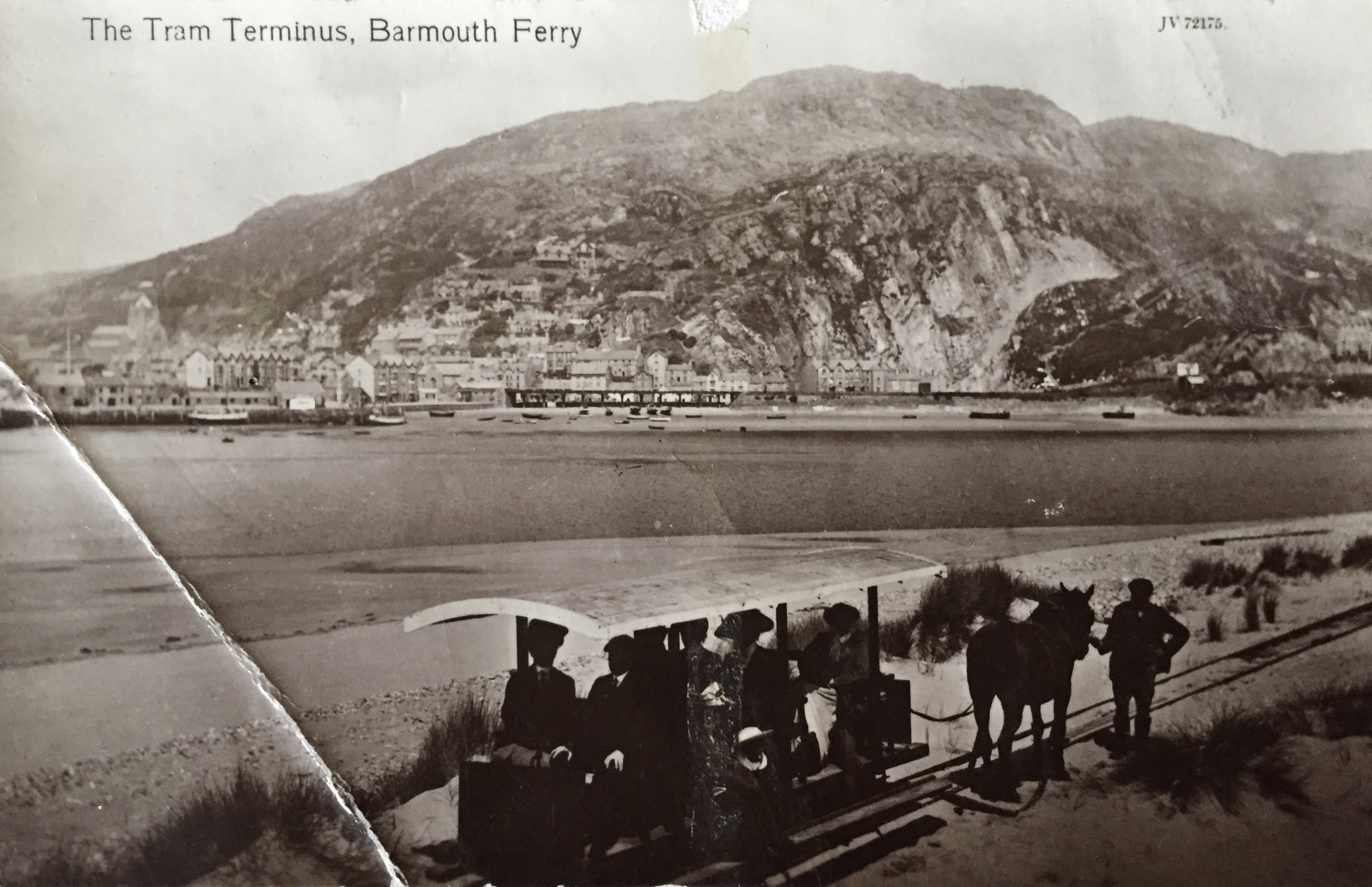
The horse-drawn tramway from Fairbourne to Barmouth Ferry, taken between 1895 and 1916. A Valentine & Sons postcard.

The line has provided a service between Fairbourne village and Penrhyn Point since its opening in 1895 as a 2 ft (610 mm) narrow gauge horse-drawn construction tramway. It was converted in 1916 to 15 in (381 mm) gauge, and again to its present gauge in 1986. Originally built to carry building materials, the railway has carried holidaymakers for over a hundred years. At its peak in the 1970s it was carrying in excess of 70,000 passengers a year.

=== The early days – Fairbourne Tramway ===
Following the construction of the Cambrian Coast Line in 1865 and the completion of the Barmouth Bridge in 1867 there were lavish schemes to develop the area for tourism, the area being easily accessible to day-trippers and weekend visitors from the Midlands.

There were several horse-drawn construction tramways in the area serving the Henddol Quarry above the neighbouring village of Friog. The tramway that was used to construct the Fairbourne village soon introduced passenger cars to transport people to the ferry station.

=== The pioneering days – Fairbourne Miniature Railway ===
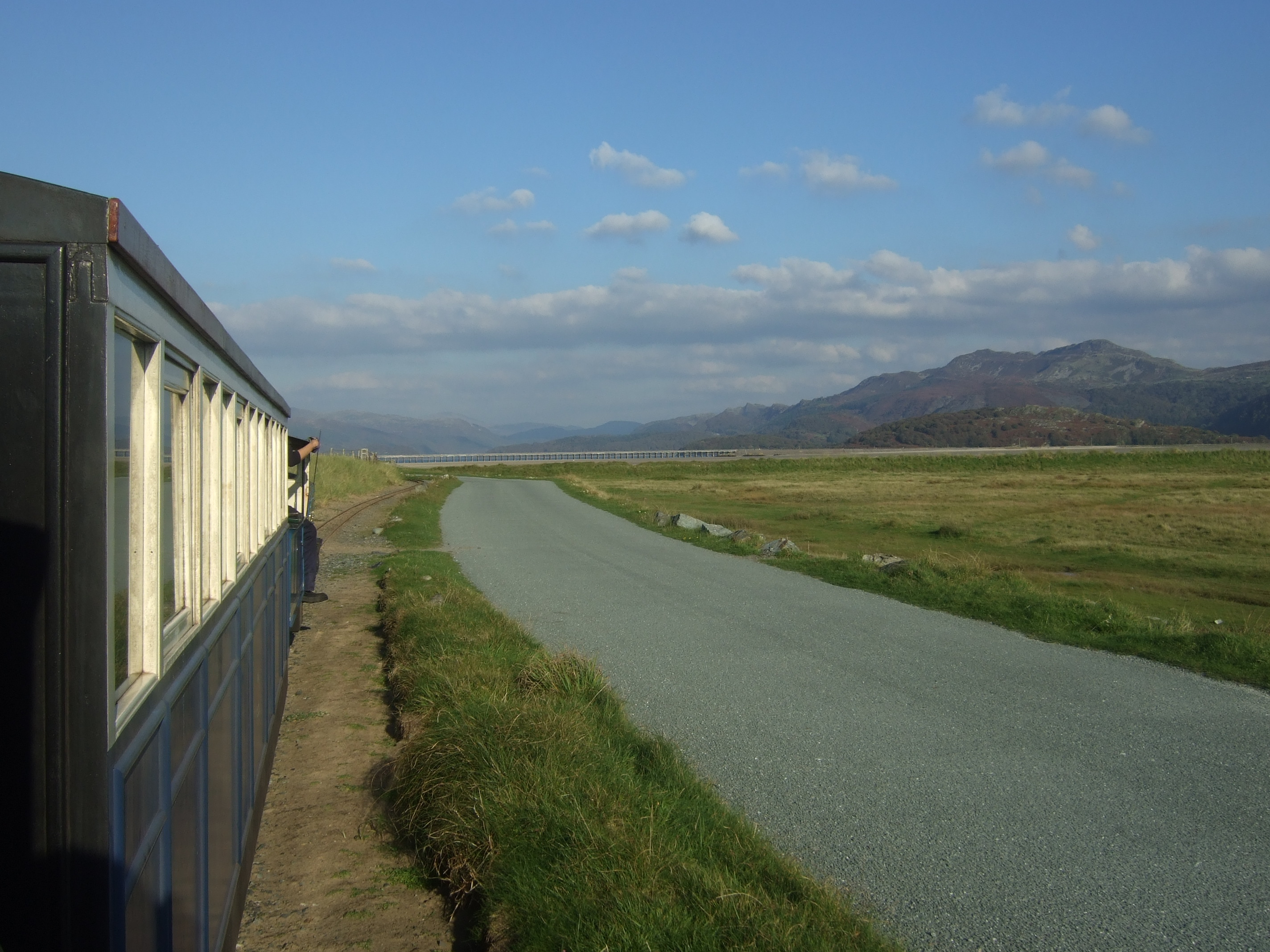
Train between Loop Halt and Estuary Halt.

A Fairbourne Railway round trip

The line was converted to a 15 in (381 mm) gauge steam railway in 1916 by Wenman Joseph Bassett-Lowke of Narrow Gauge Railways Ltd (NGR). They were keen to promote tourism in the area after the failure of the Arthog scheme in the early 1900s. The railway played an important part in the development of the 15 in (381 mm) gauge railways in the UK. Services were operated by Bassett-Lowke Class 10 locomotive Prince Edward of Wales designed by Henry Greenly and passengers were conveyed in four open top carriages.

The railway had mixed fortunes during the inter war years and went through a series of changes in ownership. At one time it was leased to the ferrymen. The railway experienced motive power problems and at one stage experimented with dual gauge track after purchasing an 18 in (457 mm) gauge locomotive. This was a model of a GNR Stirling 4-2-2. A third rail was laid as far as the Golf Course.

The line closed in 1940 after operating its final year with Whippit Quick, a Lister 'Railtruck' petrol locomotive, as the steam locomotive Count Louis was out of service.

=== The Wilkins era – 1947–1984 ===
The railway was rescued by a consortium of businessmen from the Midlands in 1946 and after rebuilding, was reopened by 1947. The line's owner John Charles Wilkins (of Wilkins & Mitchell, Darlaston), funded the redevelopment of the railway and the purchase of new steam locomotives. The line's heyday was in the 1960s and early 1970s but the advent of mass foreign holidays meant there was a steady decline in passenger numbers during the 1970s and 1980s.

=== The Ellerton era – 1984–1995 ===
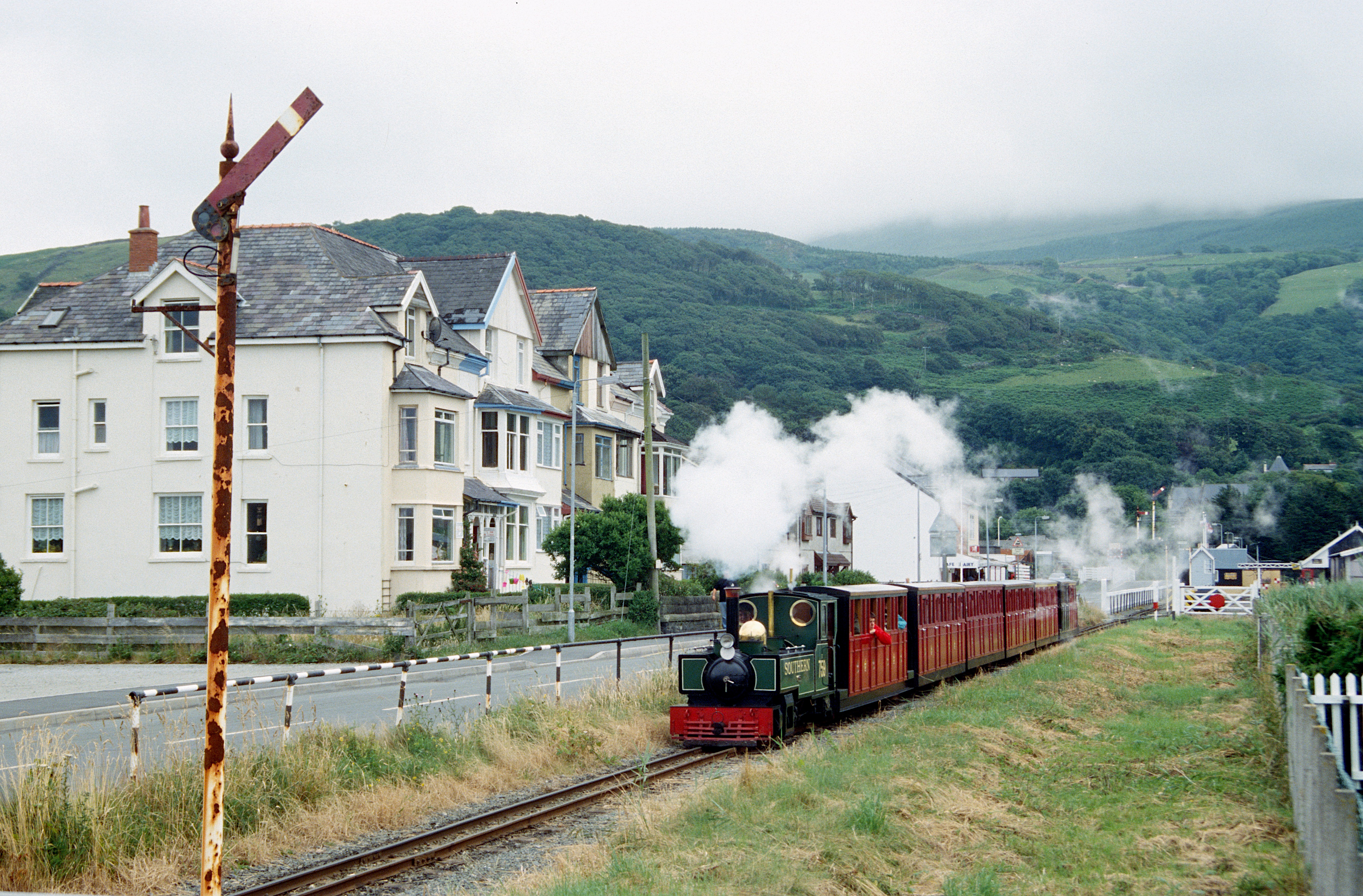
A train with Yeo leaving Fairbourne (1994)

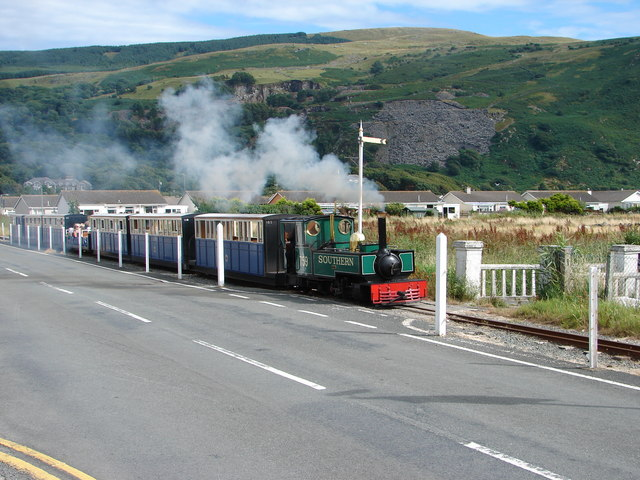
Yeo heading along Beach Road towards Penrhyn Corner.

Towards the end of the Wilkins era, the condition of the Fairbourne Railway was in serious decline and in much need of improvements. It was, subsequently, put up for sale. It was bought in 1984 by the Ellerton family and underwent dramatic changes to the infrastructure which included construction of a new station at Fairbourne and the re-gauging to 12¼ inches in 1986 to accommodate the four new steam locomotives introduced. Most of the 15 in (381 mm) gauge locomotives left the site. Two of the new locomotives had run on the Réseau Guerlédan Chemin de Fer Touristique in Brittany, France in 1978. All four steam locomotives are half sized replicas of narrow gauge engines: Yeo, Sherpa, Beddgelert and Russell. Of the extant 15 in (381 mm) gauge locomotives only Sylvia (rebuilt as Lilian Walter) remained. Most of the 15 in (381 mm) gauge locomotives are still intact and have found homes on lines around the world.

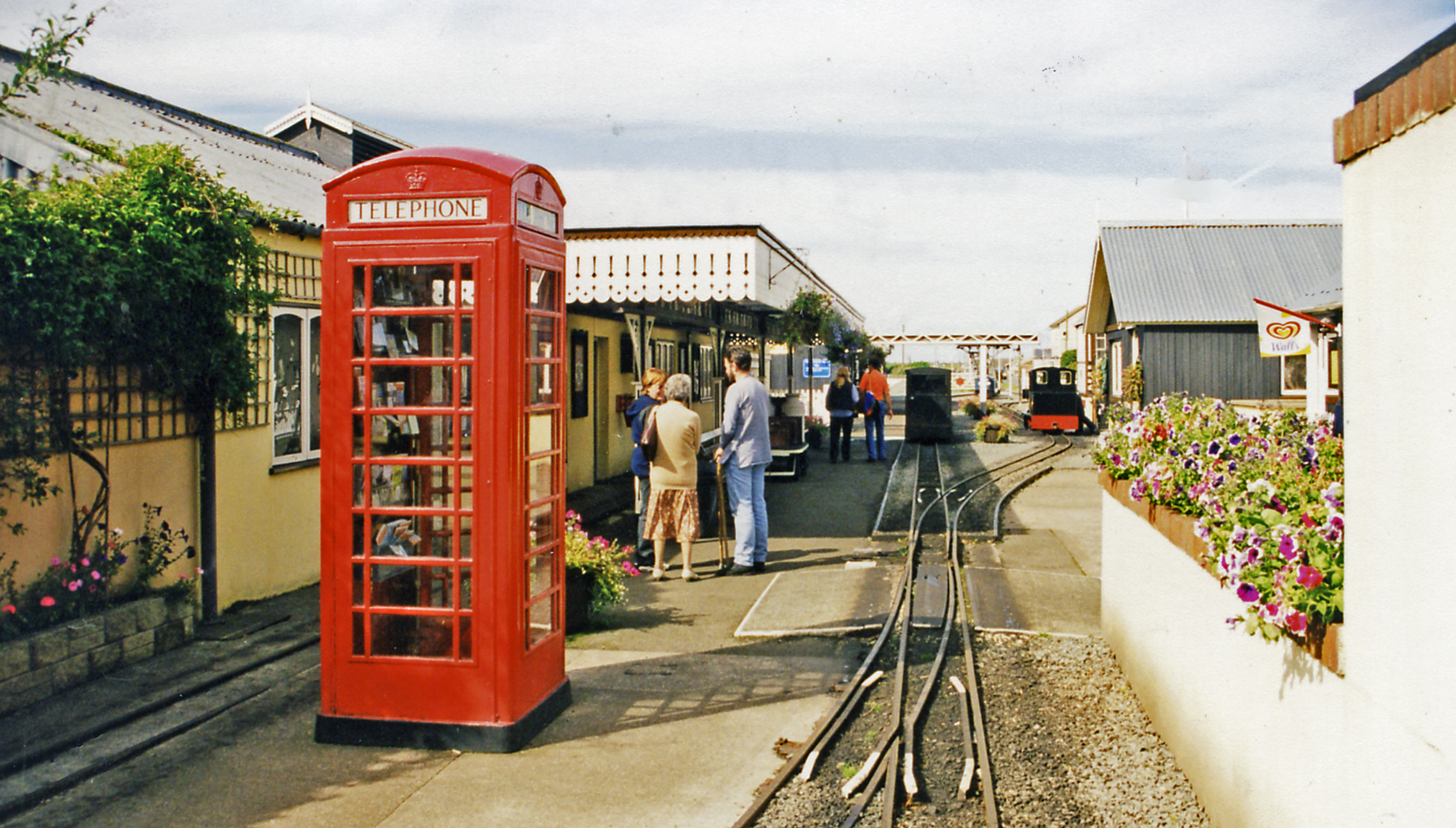
Fairbourne station in 1999

In 1990 the railway built their first steam locomotive, Number 24, a replica of a locomotive from the Sandy River & Rangeley Lakes Railroad in Maine. The locomotive has since left the line and now operates on the Cleethorpes Coast Light Railway in Lincolnshire.

The Ellerton family sold the railway during 1995, after which, the railway reverted to the name of Fairbourne Railway.

=== Present: 1995 onwards ===
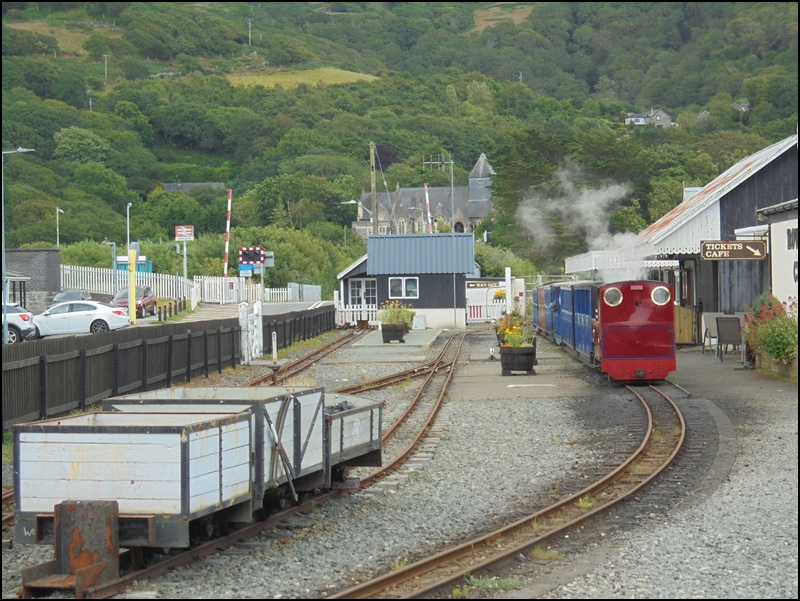
Fairbourne station July 2024

Professor Tony Atkinson and Dr Roger Melton bought the line in April 1995, they and their wives Mrs Maureen Atkinson and Mrs Amanda Melton being appointed directors. There was considerable investment in the railway to improve reliability of the locomotives and the quality of the track, and a new attraction, the Rowen Centre, was set up at Fairbourne station. In 2007 some of the displays were changed to accommodate a large G scale model railway which is gradually being added to and improved by local model engineers.

In 2008 ownership of the railway was transferred to a charity, the North Wales Coast Light Railway Limited (Registered number 1127261). Professor Atkinson subsidised the railway's operation but the subsidy was withdrawn after he died on 19 June 2011, leaving the railway's future in doubt. With reductions in staff and by the encouragement of donations the railway has been able to continue in operation.

The previous 15 inch gauge was restored as part of a dual gauge track from Fairbourne station as far as Car Park crossing over the winter of 2016/17 to allow visiting 15 inch gauge stock to run on at least part of the line usually as part of special events.

== Preservation Society ==
Like most heritage railways, the Fairbourne Railway has an active volunteer society: Fairbourne Railway Preservation Society (formerly the Fairbourne Railway Supporter's Association). The society is actively involved with the running of services and maintaining the locomotives, rolling stock, stations and track work.

== Stations and facilities ==
Image	Name	Notes
	Fairbourne (FR)	Fairbourne station is the main headquarters of the line and location of the locomotive and carriage sheds and workshops. There is a small museum containing many photographs of the line, a nature centre, G scale model railway, tea room, booking office and gift shop. From here trains head along Beach Road crossing over three level crossings before arriving at Beach Halt.
	Beach Halt	Beach Halt serves the beach, car park and amusement arcade. The station was formerly known as "Bathing Beach" during the time as a 15 in (381 mm) line. Typically, trains pass approximately 4 minutes after departing Fairbourne. From here trains head northward through the dunes, skirting the beach before arriving at Golf Halt.
	Golf Halt	Golf Halt serves the 9 hole golf course and beach. Trains pass approximately 7 minutes after departing Fairbourne. From here trains continue northwards alongside the sea wall before reaching Loop Halt.
	Loop Halt	Loop Halt serves the embankment footpath to Morfa Mawddach and the Barmouth Bridge. Trains pass here approximately 9 minutes after leaving Fairbourne. Trains continue into the passing loop and during the two train service pass each other. The line then sweeps out into the sand dunes.
	Estuary Halt	Estuary Halt is adjacent to the Jack Steele Tunnel and serves the car park at the end of Penrhyn Drive North. Trains pass here approximately 16 minutes after leaving Fairbourne. From here trains continue through the tunnel and more dunes before arriving at Barmouth Ferry.
	Barmouth Ferry	Barmouth Ferry is the northern terminus of the railway and was situated on a balloon loop so the locomotives did not have to run round their trains. This is no longer in use and is disconnected. Locomotives run around the trains on arrival. It is also the site of the Harbour View café and from here passengers can catch the pedestrian ferry across the estuary to Barmouth.

== Operation ==
Steam Locomotives haul most of the passenger services, some of the locomotives are approximately half-size replicas of famous narrow gauge prototype locomotives such as the Class B Tanks from the Darjeeling Himalayan Railway and the Manning Wardle Tanks of the Lynton and Barnstaple Railway.

== Bibliography ==
Books

- Boyd, James I.C. (1970) [1965]. Narrow Gauge Railways in Mid-Wales. The British Narrow Gauge Railway (2nd ed.). Lingfield, Surrey: The Oakwood Press. ISBN 978-0-85361-024-3. OCLC 499283322. No.3.
- Buck, Stan; Siân and Katie - The Twining Sisters, Siân Project Group, 1995
- Buck, Stan (2004). E. W. Twining, Modelmaker, Artist & Engineer. Ashbourne: Landmark Publishing. ISBN 978-1-84306-143-4.
- Butcher, Alan C. (2004). Railways Restored 2005. Hersham: Ian Allan Publishing. ISBN 978-0-7110-3053-4.
- Green, C.C. (1996) [1983]. North Wales Branch Line Album. Shepperton: Ian Allan Publishing. ISBN 978-0-7110-1252-3.
- Milner, W.J. (1996). Rails through the sand- : an illustrated history of the Fairbourne Miniature Railway, 1916-1985, including the Barmouth Junction & Arthog tramways. Chester: Rail Romances. ISBN 978-1-900622-00-4.
- Wilkins, J. (1961). Fairbourne Railway - A Short History of Its Development and Progress. Fairbourne Railway Ltd. OCLC 867825436.
- Fairbourne Railway; Souvenir Guide Book, 2005.

Magazines

- One Foot Between The Rails published quarterly by the Fairbourne Railway Preservation Society.

Multimedia

- Tracks in the Sand The Story of the Fairbourne Railway – a film by Eric Montague was released in 2007. A Century of Steam was released in 2016 recording the Fairbourne Centenary of Steam Gala. These DVD's are also available from The Fairbourne Railway website.
