= Fairbourne =

Village in Gwynedd, Wales

Coordinates: 52.697°N 4.053°W

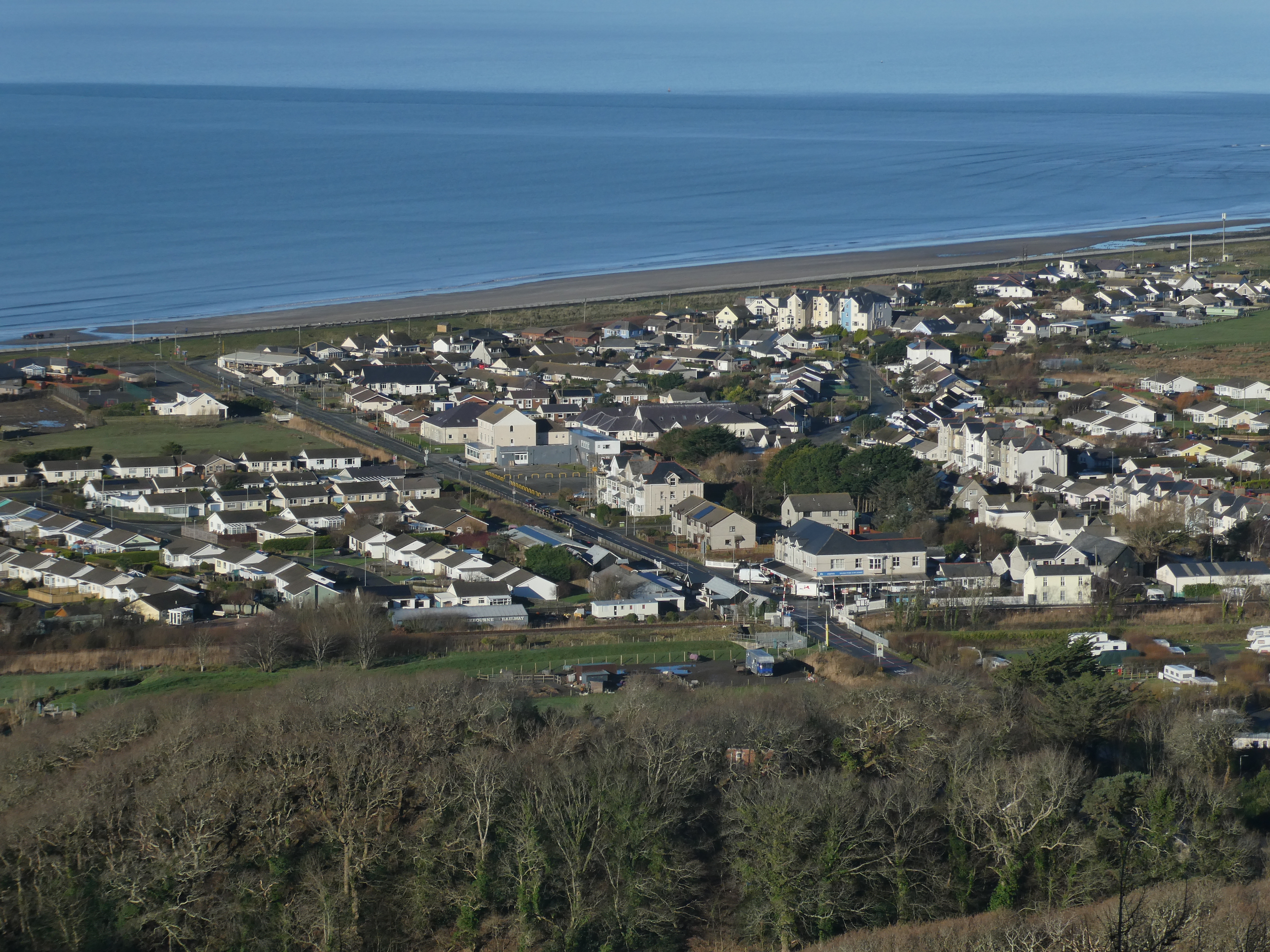
- Fairbourne viewed from Golwern slate quarry

- Location within Gwynedd
- Population: 1,031
- OS grid reference: SH614130
- Community: Arthog
- Principal area: Gwynedd
- Preserved county: Gwynedd
- Country: Wales
- Sovereign state: United Kingdom
- Post town: FAIRBOURNE
- Postcode district: LL38
- Dialling code: 01341
- Police: North Wales
- Fire: North Wales
- Ambulance: Welsh
- UK Parliament: Dwyfor Meirionnydd
- Senedd Cymru – Welsh Parliament: Dwyfor Meirionnydd

Fairbourne is a seaside village in Gwynedd, Wales. Located on the coast of Barmouth Bay in Arthog community, to the south of the estuary of the River Mawddach, it is surrounded by Snowdonia National Park. It is in an area that had been listed by Gwynedd Council for managed retreat due to rising sea levels.

== History ==
Fairbourne is part of the historic county of Meirionnydd. The area was originally salt marshes and slightly higher grazing lands. Before development began in the mid-19th century, there were three farms on the land. The coastal area was originally known as Morfa Henddol, while the promontory outcrop now occupied by the Fairbourne Hotel was called Ynysfaig.

Around 1865, Solomon Andrews, a Welsh entrepreneur, purchased the promontory. Over the next few years, he built a sea wall for tidal protection and several houses. To facilitate this, he built a 2 ft (610 mm) gauge horse-drawn tramway from the main railway to the site in order to bring in building materials. In 1916, the tramway was converted to a 15 in (381 mm) gauge steam railway. The wealthy flour-maker Sir Arthur McDougall had been looking for a country estate, but when he discovered this area, he soon conceived of it as a seaside resort. In July 1895, McDougall purchased a substantial acreage from land speculators, which he enlarged by additional lots the following year. He then immediately hired a builder to begin the development of a model seaside resort.

Unusually for Gwynedd county, the village has no official Welsh-language name. Unlike most of Gwynedd, where Welsh is the majority language, English is the predominant language in Fairbourne; most of its inhabitants come from or are descended from those who came from England.

== Management of rise in sea level ==
Fairbourne had been identified as unsustainable to defend, given predicted sea level rise. The best estimate was that the area would be abandoned between 2052 and 2062. This was based on a rise in critical sea level of 0.5 metres (1.6 ft). However, based on current rates of sea level rise it would take 100 to 200 years from 2014 to reach 0.5 metres. It was intended to maintain the village's sea defences for only 40 years from 2014. This policy of managed retreat was strongly opposed by local residents.

=== 2021 ===
In November 2021, government officials declared that by 2052, it would no longer be safe/sustainable to live in the village. This has been disputed by a number of research reports.

In 2021 a survey was carried out by Arthog Community Council to obtain the views of Fairbourne residents on the proposed plans for the village. Residents felt that their concerns were being ignored, and that Fairbourne was being selected for decommissioning without adequate justification:

"Having attended the multi-agency meeting in the village hall, residents are 'stone walled', not listened to, and told what to do without our views being considered."

"It has been stressed at public meetings and acknowledged by Natural Resources Wales that local knowledge is important. Is Gwynedd Council just relying on consultants with computers?"

=== 2022 ===
In March 2022, the issue of Fairbourne was raised in the Welsh Senedd by Mabon ap Gwynfor AS: "The west of Wales shoreline management plan is based on work done 10 years ago. Now, since then, of course, a great deal of work has been done on coastal flood defences, which changes the forecast for communities such as Fairbourne, but the plans haven't changed to reflect this work... There is room to doubt the modelling of Natural Resources Wales, which is based on inadequate data and old software."

In May 2022, Arthog Community Council approved a motion to reject the plans by Gwynedd Council to decommission Fairbourne village, citing various failings in the decision-making process.

In November 2022, Huw Williams of Gwynedd Council stated: "The Fairbourne Moving Forward Project Board has been aware of the negative impact on the community as a consequence of the mention of 'decommissioning' Fairbourne in '2054' by the press and other stakeholders"...."There are no current plans to decommission the village". An email to Arthog Community Council from Mr Williams from July 2022 also contains the line: "No public body – let alone Gwynedd Council – is intending to destroy Fairbourne."

=== 2023–2025 ===
In May 2023, Welsh Government Climate Change minister Julie James was asked about the future of the village. She was adamant that the village had not been written off. She said: "We have made no decision on the future of Fairbourne, I want to make that clear."

Arnall and Hilson (2023) investigated the political conflict which had developed between residents of Fairbourne and Gwynedd Council. They concluded: "The paper highlights the need for improved dialogue...This is potentially one way to minimise the present-day harms resulting from the projected effects of sea level rise and to imagine more open-ended, hopeful futures for affected coastal communities."

In a constituency report of December 2024, Mabon ap Gwynfor stated that he had again raised the issue of Fairbourne in the Welsh Senedd: “I asked for a Statement on the long term prospects of Fairbourne. Local people are unable to get mortgages and insurance because of fears about coastal flooding. Sea defences have been improved and Fairbourne is now safe. This message needs to get out and I urged the Minister to make a statement.”

The Arthog Community Council Annual Report for 2024-5 contains a note: "Late 2023 and early 2024 the Fairbourne Partnership was told by Cabinet member Berwyn Parry-Jones that decommissioning had never been discussed, voted upon or put on the statute books at any Cyngor Gwynedd Cabinet Meeting, therefore, it was a myth."

=== 2026 ===
Beginning in February 2026, Natural Resources Wales is carrying out shingle reprofiling work along the spit south of Fairbourne as part of its ongoing programme to manage flood risk and maintain the coastal defences of the village. "The scheme involves moving shingle from the northern end of the beach to areas in the south where the natural material has become depleted or eroded. This reprofiling helps restore the beach to the shape needed to absorb wave energy and reduce the risk of overtopping during storm conditions."

There is ongoing frustration in the village with the way that the false threat of decommissioning of Fairbourne is portrayed in the media. The Arthog Community Council Annual Report for 2025-2026 comments: "The Village of Fairbourne is still being pestered by Media, Academic and TV Stations from all over the World, to comment on how Fairbourne is dealing with the threat of decommissioning. No matter how many times they are told that the conversation has now changed, and that Fairbourne is now being treated exactly the same as any coastal community, ... they keep on coming back."

== Attractions ==
=== Beach ===
The beach is a two-mile stretch of sand, backed by a steep storm beach of pebbles which is as high as the sea defences in some places. At its northern end the beach joins the Mawddach Estuary, while at its southern end it is squeezed between sheer cliffs and the sea. People exercise their dogs on the beach, but in summer there is a dog ban in the central area. The beach is fronted by tank traps known as "Dragon's Teeth" dating from the Second World War. The beach regularly meets the European Blue Flag criteria.

The concrete ramp that had provided access to the beach for wheelchairs and prams, originally intended as a boat ramp, was damaged by a storm in 2018 and was removed by Gwynedd Council. Villagers have petitioned for a new access route to be built.

=== Railway and Ferry ===
The Fairbourne Railway has provided a link from the village to Penrhyn Point for over a century. It runs regular passenger services between April and October.

The Barmouth Ferry sails from the seaward end of the Fairbourne Railway to Barmouth/Abermaw.

== Transport ==
Fairbourne railway station is served by the Cambrian Coast Railway, which runs from Machynlleth to Pwllheli and is operated by Transport for Wales.

Lloyds Coaches also operate a regular bus service to Dolgellau and Tywyn.
